= Frans Hals Museum - Hal =

Art museum in Haarlem, Netherlands

Coordinates: 52°22′51″N 4°38′10″E

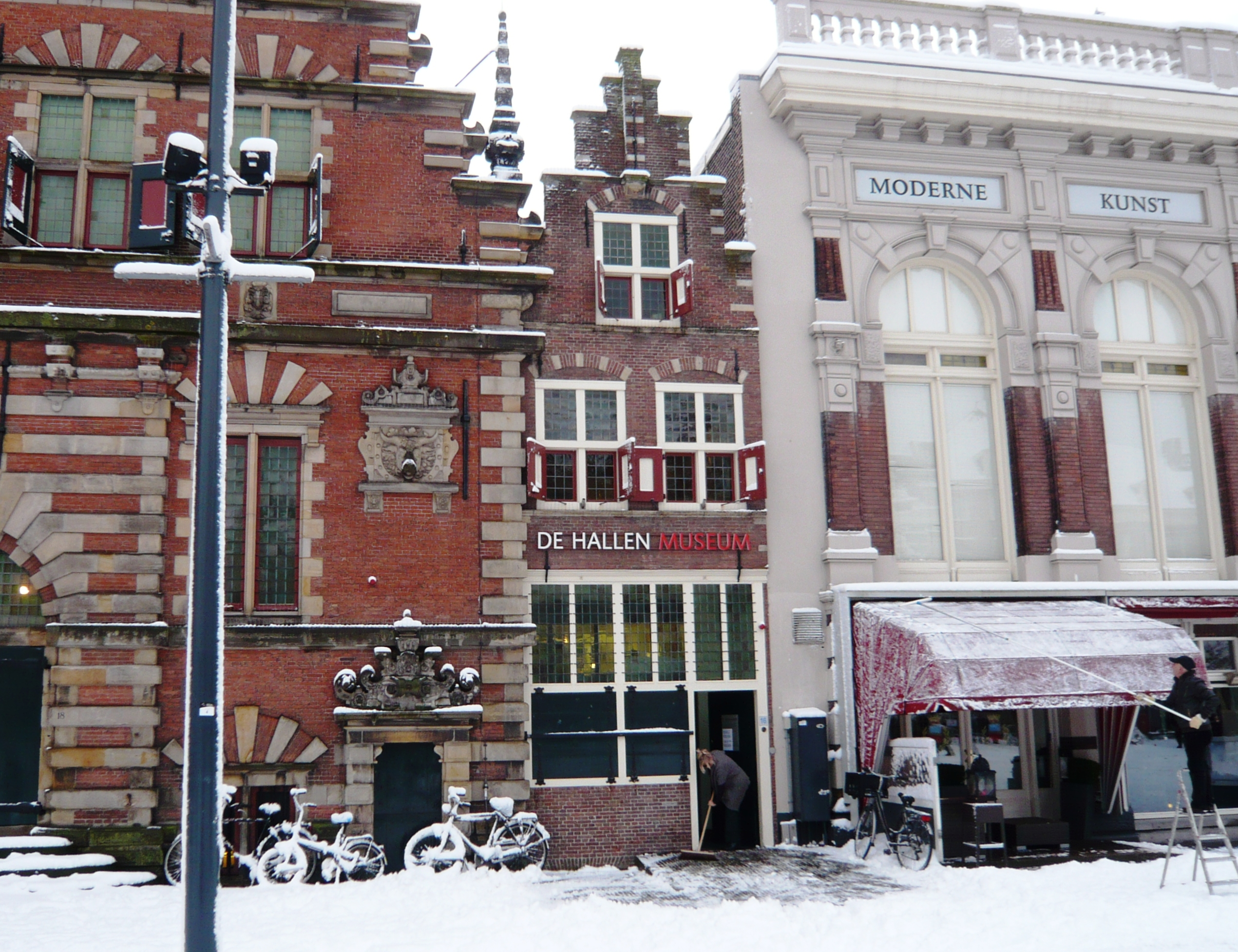
Entrance to the museum through the middle house between the Vleeshal and Verweyhal.

Frans Hals Museum - Hal (until March 29, 2018: De Hallen Haarlem) was one of the two locations of the Frans Hals Museum, located on the Grote Markt, Haarlem, Netherlands, where modern and contemporary art was on display in alternating presentations. The emphasis was on contemporary photograph and video presentations, with the focus on Man and society.

The museum consists of three different buildings, the Vleeshal (Flesher's hall) on the east side and the Verweyhal (named for Kees Verwey) on the west side are two large "halls" sandwiching the small entrance building. All three buildings are National Heritage sites today.

== De Vleeshal building ==
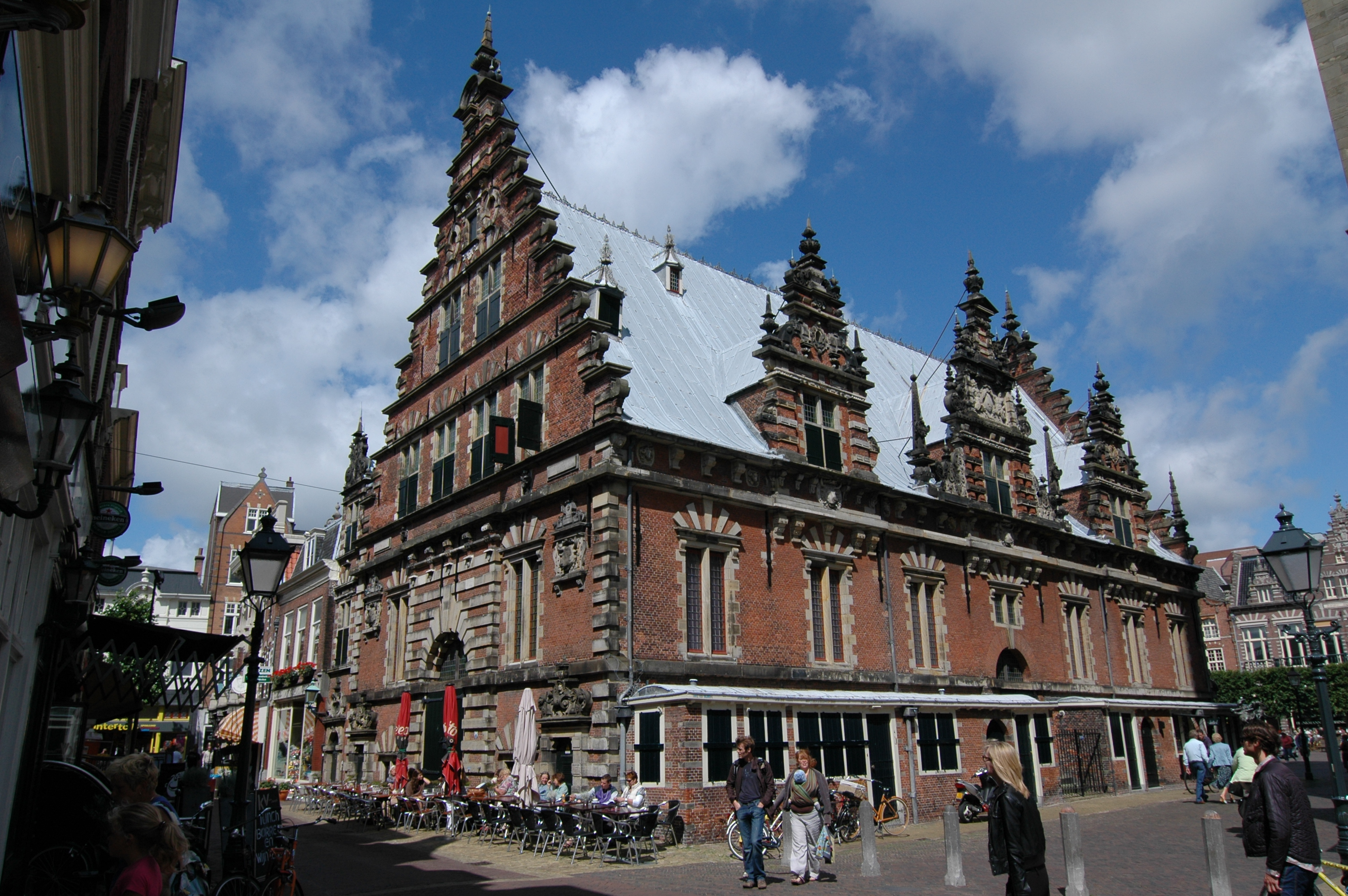
View from the Spekstraat, or Bacon-street. The entrance is on the other side.

The Vleeshal was built in the years 1602 to 1605 and was originally a ‘meat hall’ where butchers sold their goods. The heads of bulls and rams on the façades are reminders of the original function of the building. It is an example of Dutch Renaissance architecture, with Renaissance ornaments being applied on a basic Gothic structure (floor plan and outer walls). The Renaissance forms include pilasters, rustication, Tuscan (interior) pillars, scrollwork (above the cellar entrances) and obelisks. Sample prints by Hans Vredeman de Vries from Antwerp provided a source of inspiration for this. De Vleeshal was built by Lieven de Key, the town architect, commissioned by the city government, which judging by the finished building had a substantial treasury at the time. It remained a meat hall all the way into the 19th century.

The building later fulfilled a totally different function; from 1840 to 1885 it served as a storehouse for a garrison quartered in Haarlem. Later the building served as a Public Records Office, and after that as a depot for the municipal library. During the Second World War the building was occupied by the Distribution Service.

After World War II, the Mayor and Aldermen decided that the building should be repurposed as an exhibition hall, with the first exhibitions held in 1950. De Hallen Haarlem organizes alternating exhibitions of contemporary art on two floors, showcasing both contemporary and modern art throughout the summer. The Archeological Museum is located in the cellar of the building.

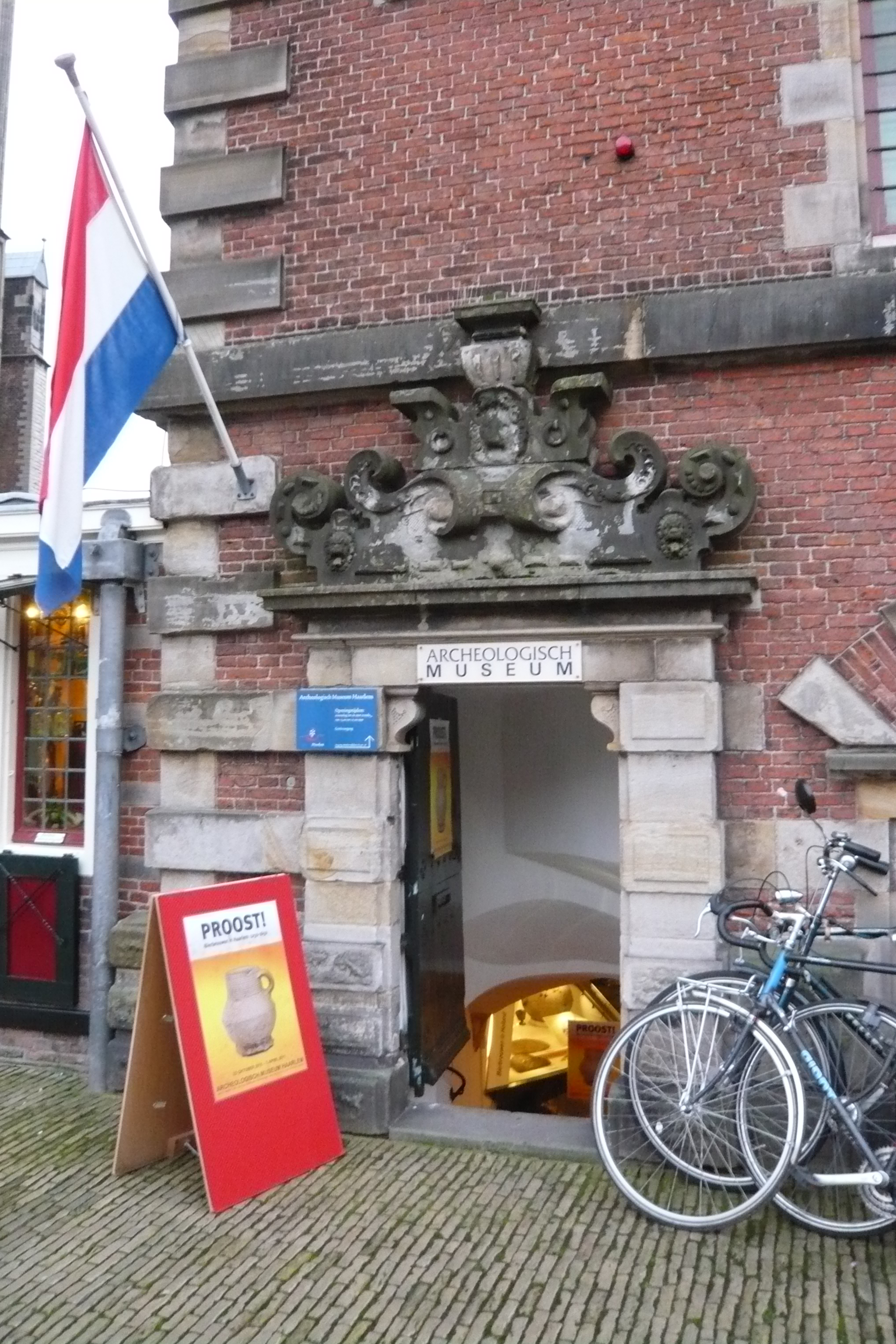
The cellar of the Vleeshal is in use by the Archeologisch Museum Haarlem. Visitors with a handicap can use an elevator that can be reached through the museum's entrance.

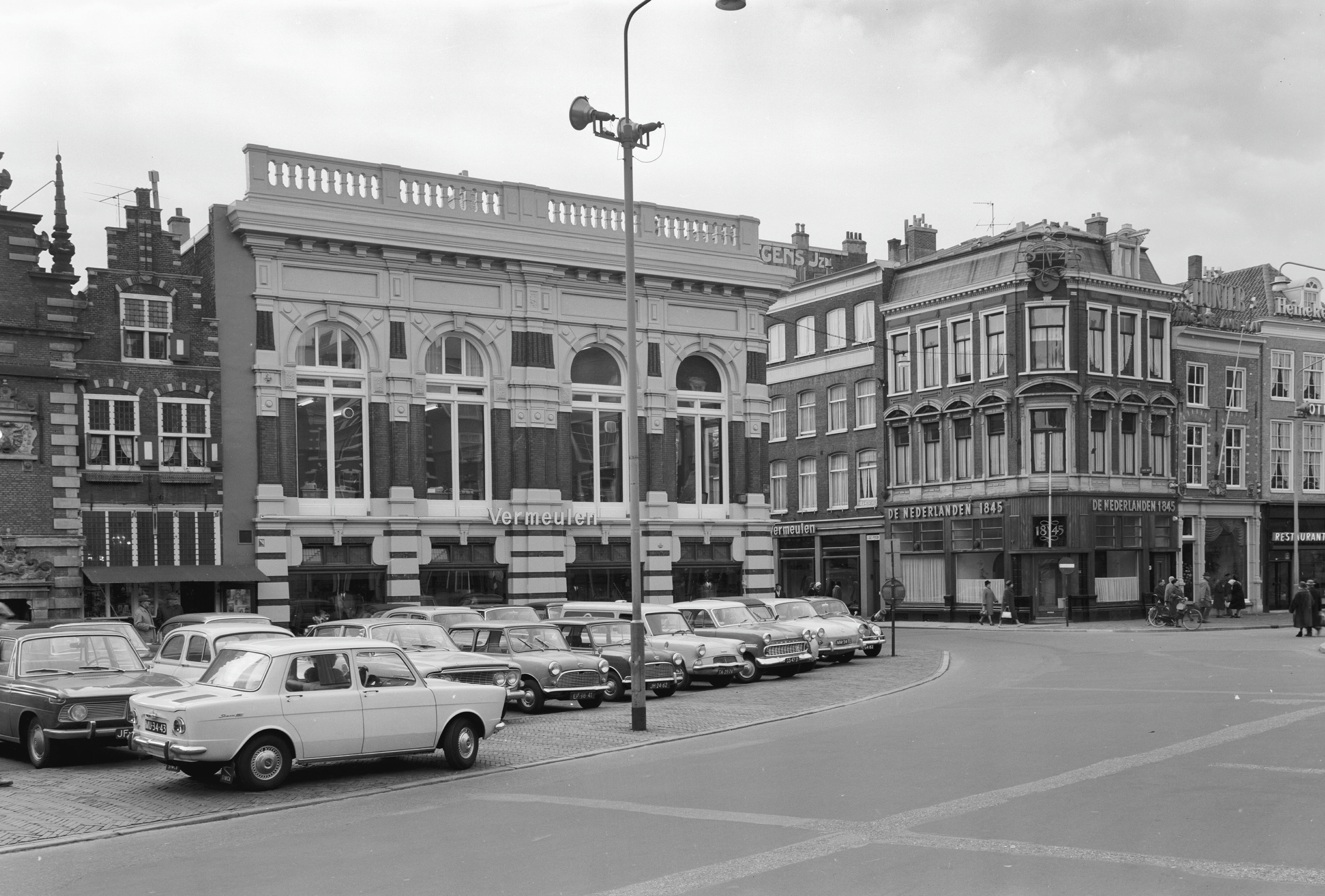
The area in front of the museum was a parking lot for visitors and employees before the Verweyhal was added the gallery in 1992.

== Entrance building ==
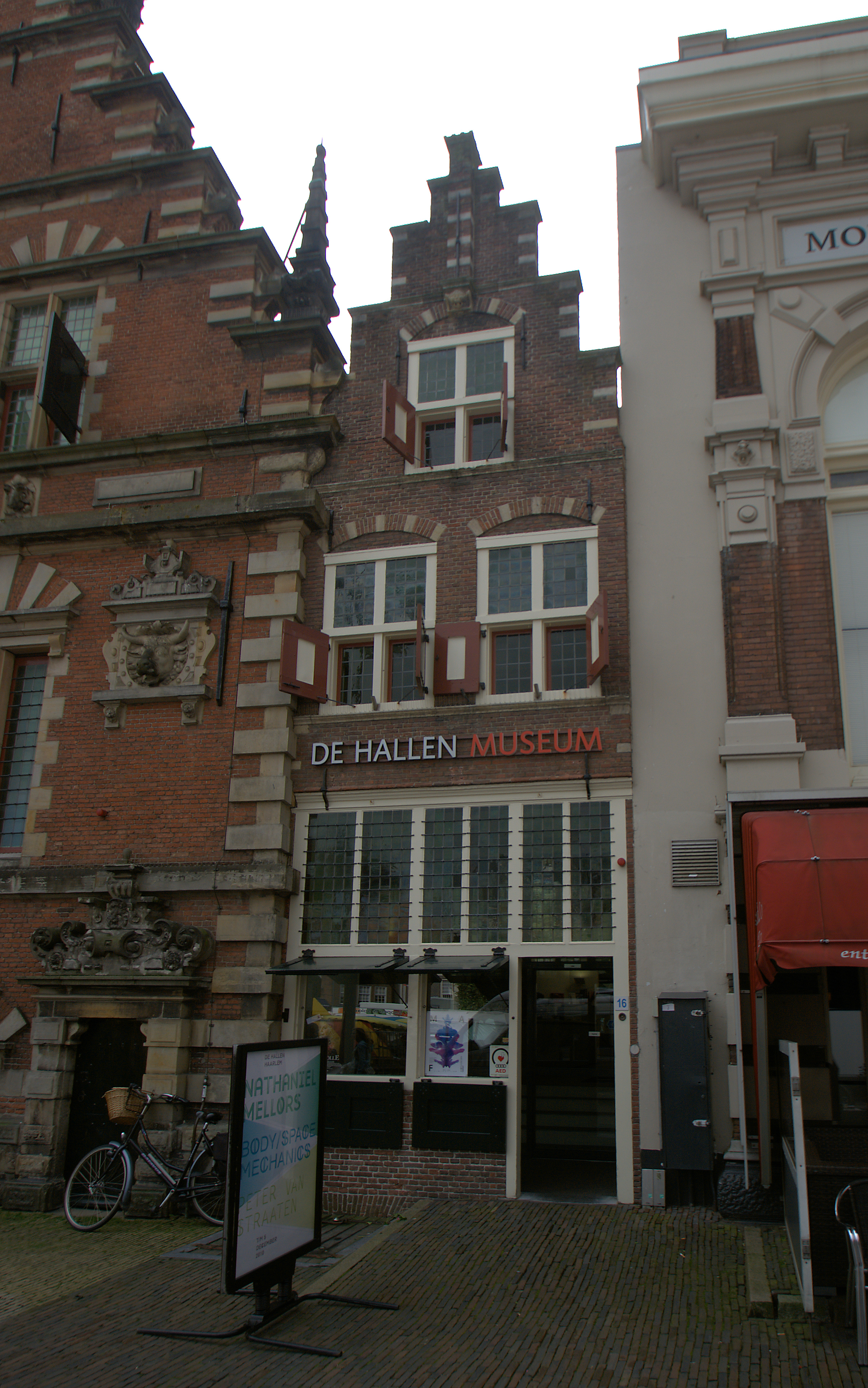
Entrance to the museum

The little ‘fish house’ in between the two main halls was once the home of the servant of the fish market across the square and served as the entrance for Frans Hals Museum - Hal until August 2025.

== Verweyhal ==
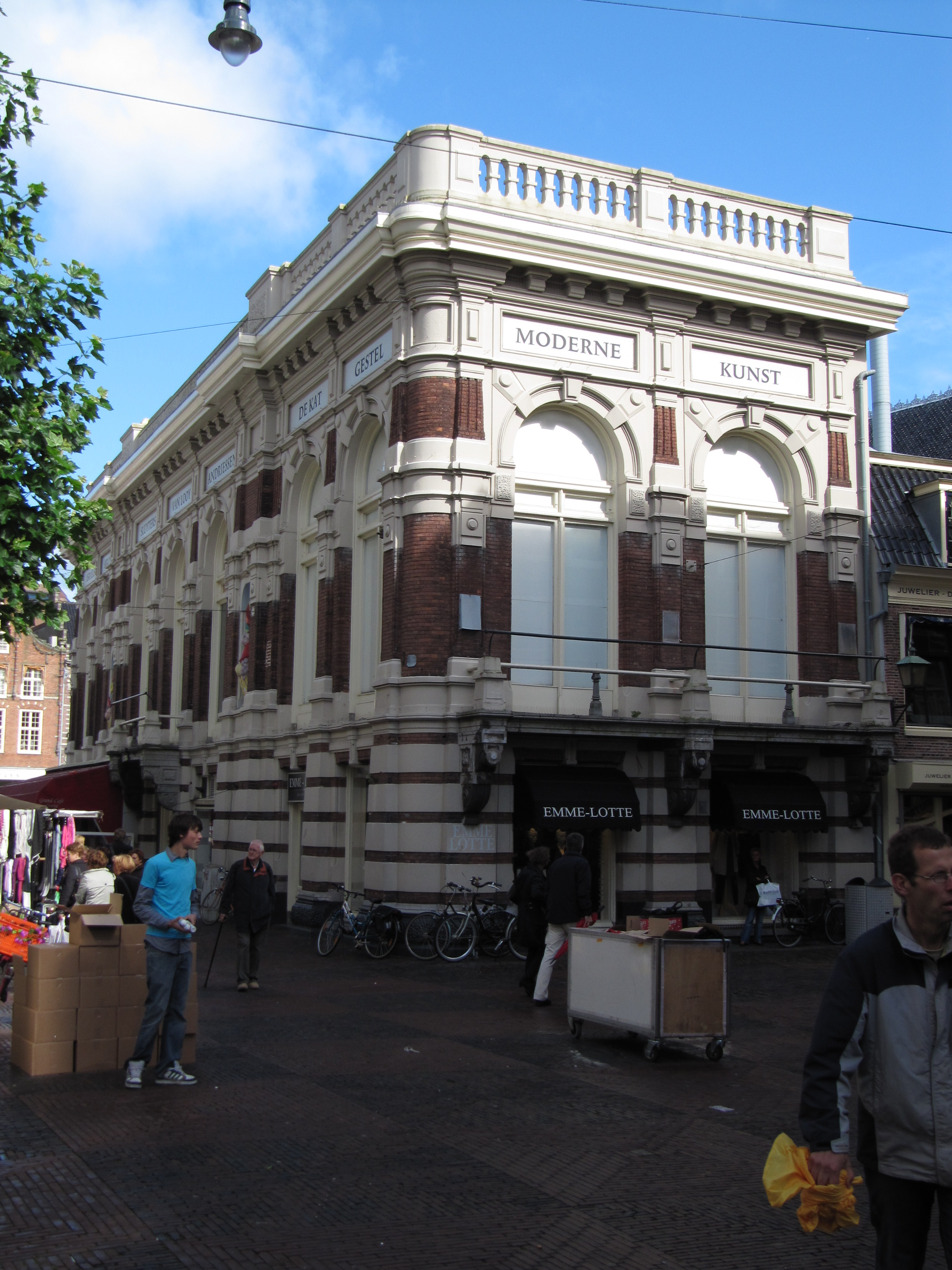
Verwey hall from the Grote Houtstraat looking north. The street level is in use by shops and a restaurant, and the upper levels are accessible from the entrance near the Vleeshal. Along the top of the facade are the words "Modern Art" and the more famous names in Haarlem Modern art as of 1992, when local artist Kees Verwey financed the renovation of the old hall to house his collection. Israëls, Kruyder, Sluyters, Van Looy, Andriessen, De Kat and Gestel.

The Verweyhal is a former society meeting hall next to the main entrance on the corner of the Grote Markt and the Grote Houtstraat, where the former main entrance to it is located. The Verweyhal was built in the 19th century as a home for the Haarlem gentlemen's society Trou moet Blycken.

The building is in the Eclectic style and also contains some art deco features in the interior though it has been renovated beyond recognition since 1880. It became a modern art exhibition hall in 1992 when the Kees Verwey Foundation renovated it and gave the artist's oeuvre to the Frans Hals Museum.
