= Grote Houtstraat =

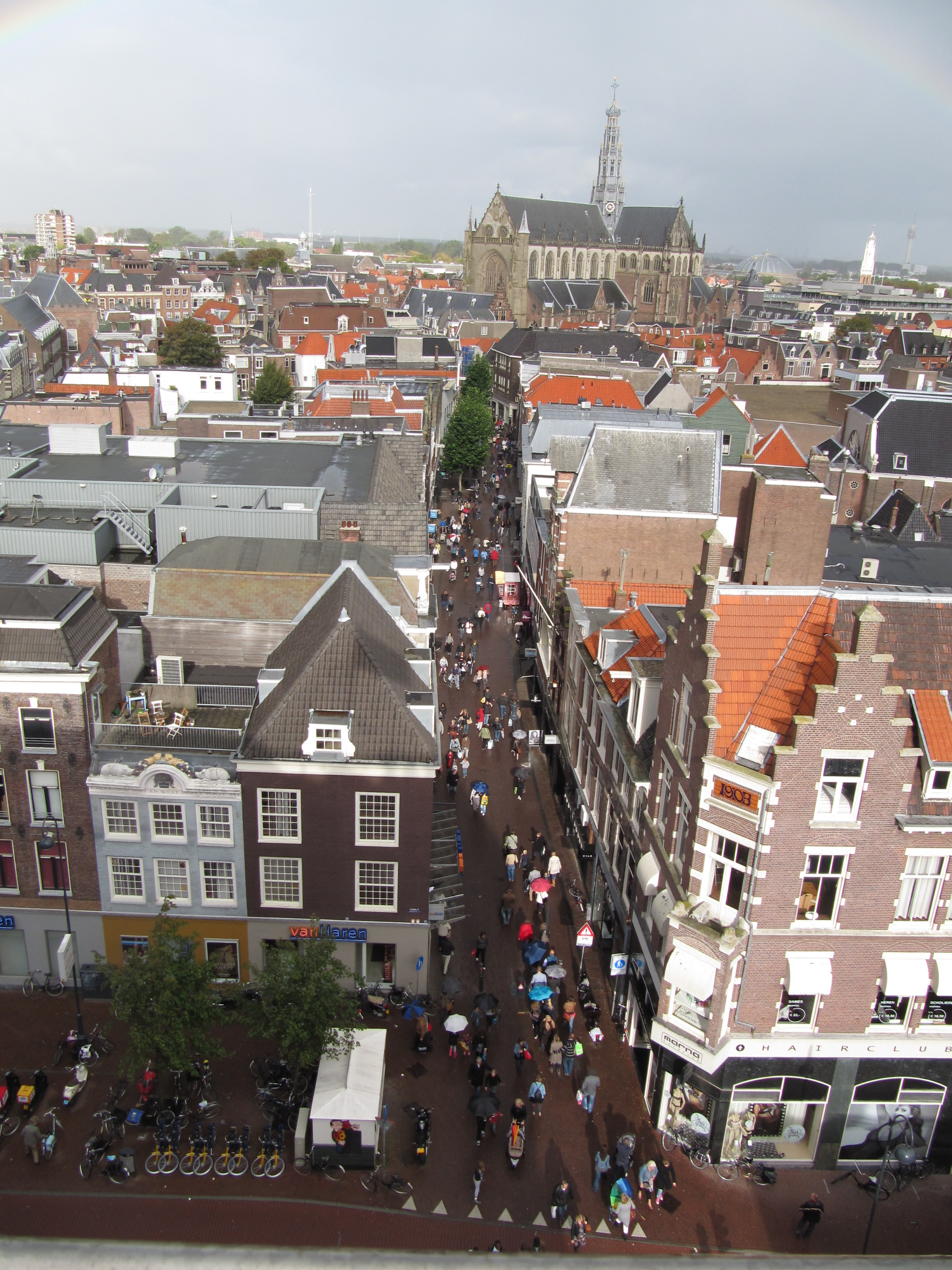
The older half of the Grote Houtstraat from the corner of the Gedempte Oude Gracht looking North towards the Grote Markt and the St. Bavochurch

The Grote Houtstraat is a shopping street in Haarlem that connects the Grote Markt to the Houtplein in the direction of the Haarlemmerhout woods.

== History ==
The street forms one of two old parallel routes running through the city on either side of the Grote Markt linking Heemstede to Schoten, and is one of the oldest streets in Haarlem.

The Grote Houtstraat in Haarlem was originally just called the "Houtstraat" (Wood street) as it was the major road leading from the Grote Markt to the woods called the Haarlemmerhout. Until the 15th century it ended at what is today the Gedempte Oude Gracht, at that time the southern canal of the city. In the 15th century the town expanded southwards and the street was extended to the Gasthuissingel and a large town gate was placed near the bridge, which has since been torn down.

== Shopping street ==
The street is lined with rijksmonuments such as the Verwey Hall, the Doopsgezinde Kerk, the Proveniershuis and the society Trou moet Blycken.

The Dutch version of Monopoly includes three Haarlem streets: Barteljorisstraat, Zijlweg and "Houtstraat" which refers to the Grote Houtstraat and the Kleine Houtstraat. All four of these streets are shopping streets today that convey pedestrians from the north, west and south to the Grote Markt.

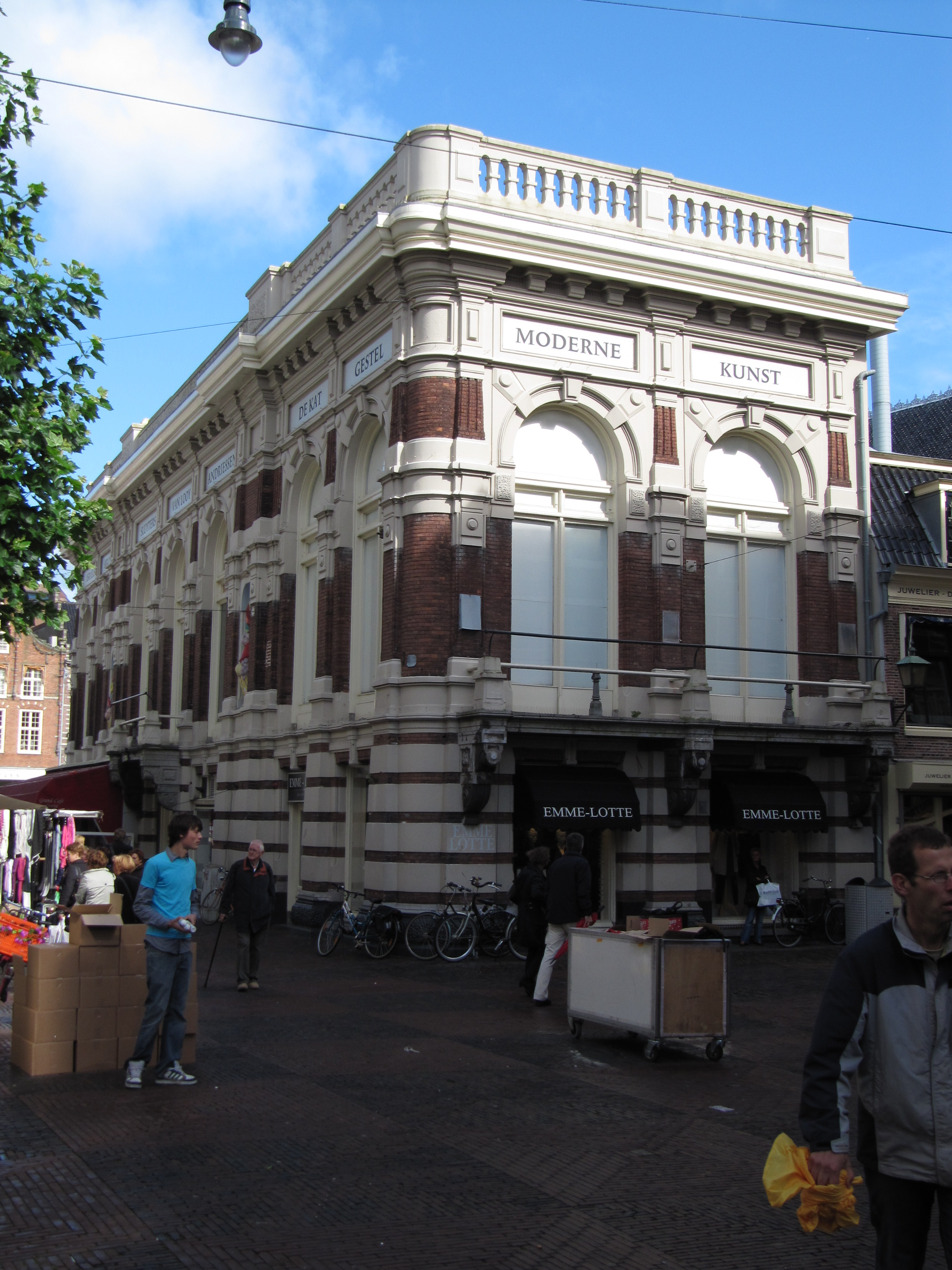
The Verweyhal, part of the museum De Hallen on the Grote Houtstraat at the corner of the Anegang

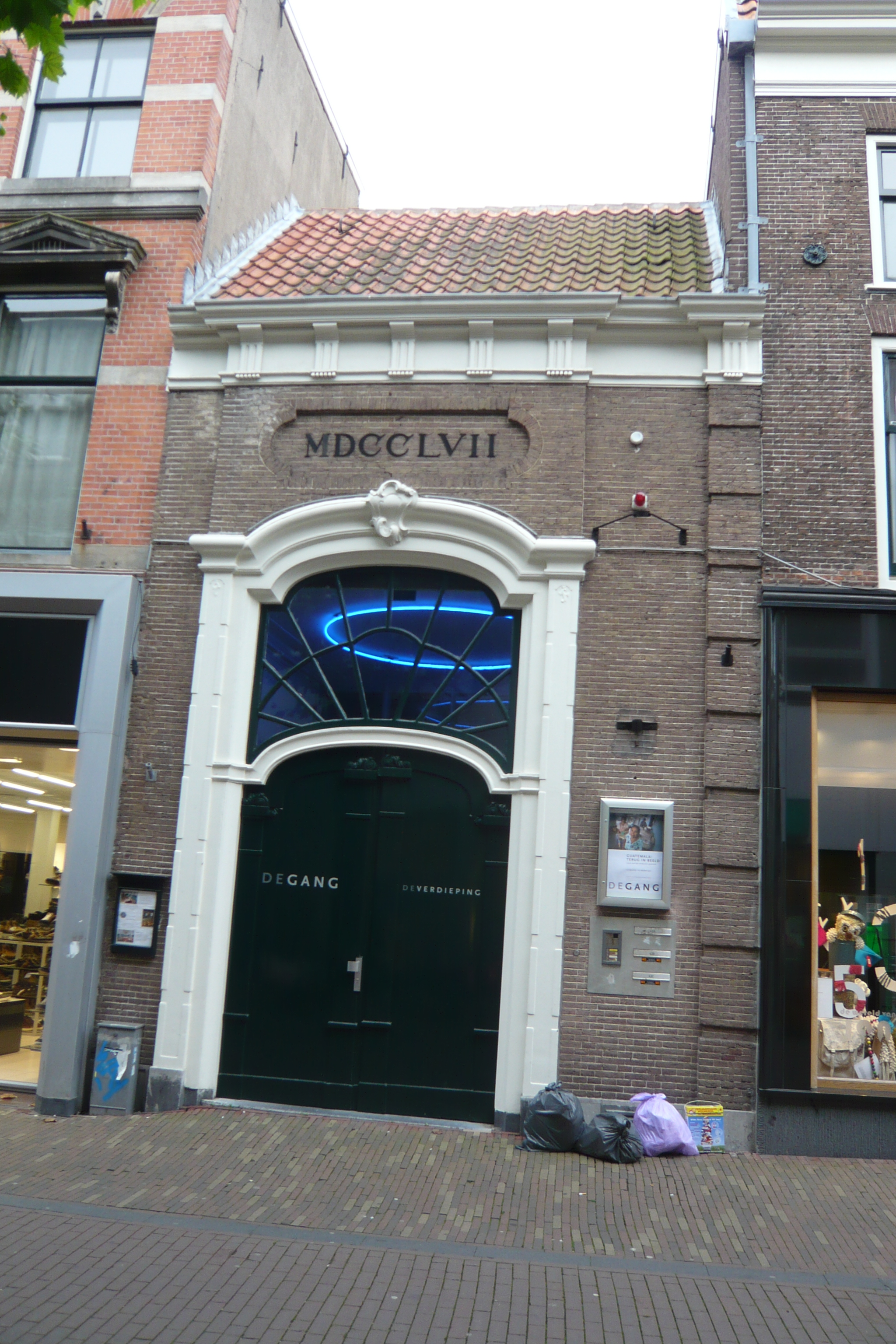
This modest entrance from 1757 which leads to the Doopsgezinde or Mennonite church of 1683, has been made more noticeable with a neon lamp.

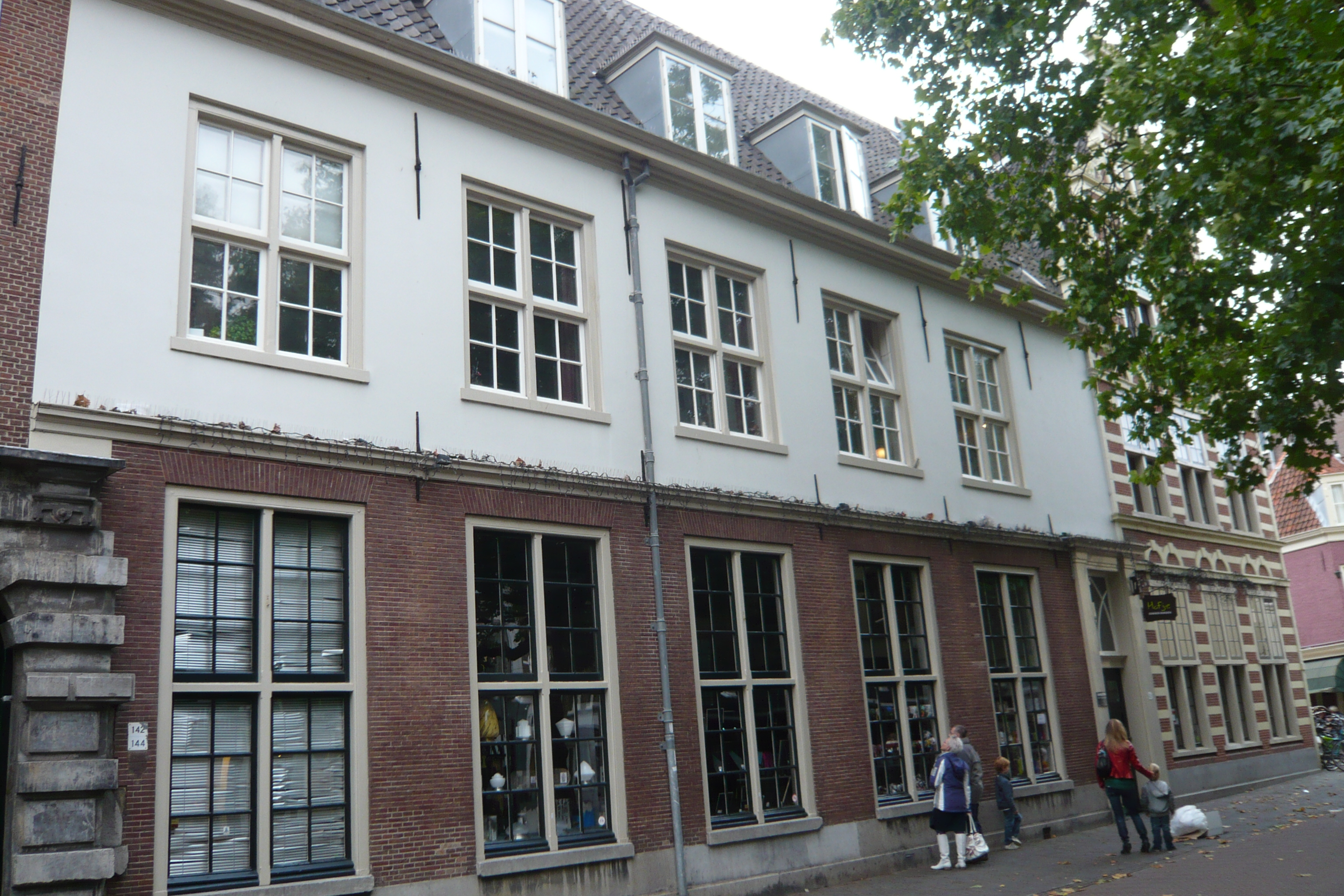
The shops in what was once known as the St. Joris Doelen, today called the Proveniershuis. The paintings of the civic guard of St. George by Frans Hals once hung in these two buildings (the building on the right corner was the meeting hall with the residence of the castelein or keeper attached).

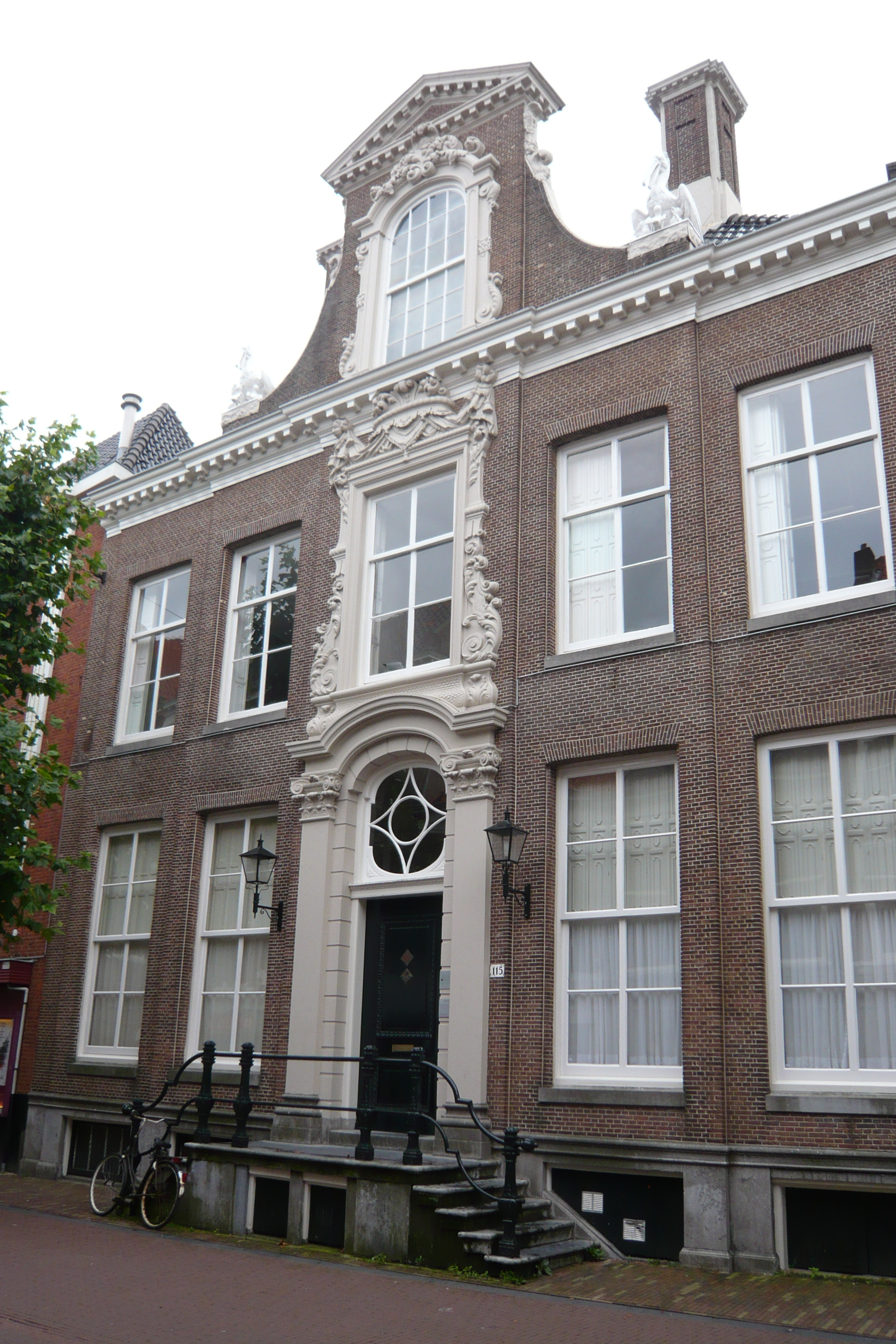
The seat of the society "Trou moet Blycken"
