= Verweyhal =

Coordinates: 52°22′51″N 4°38′10″E

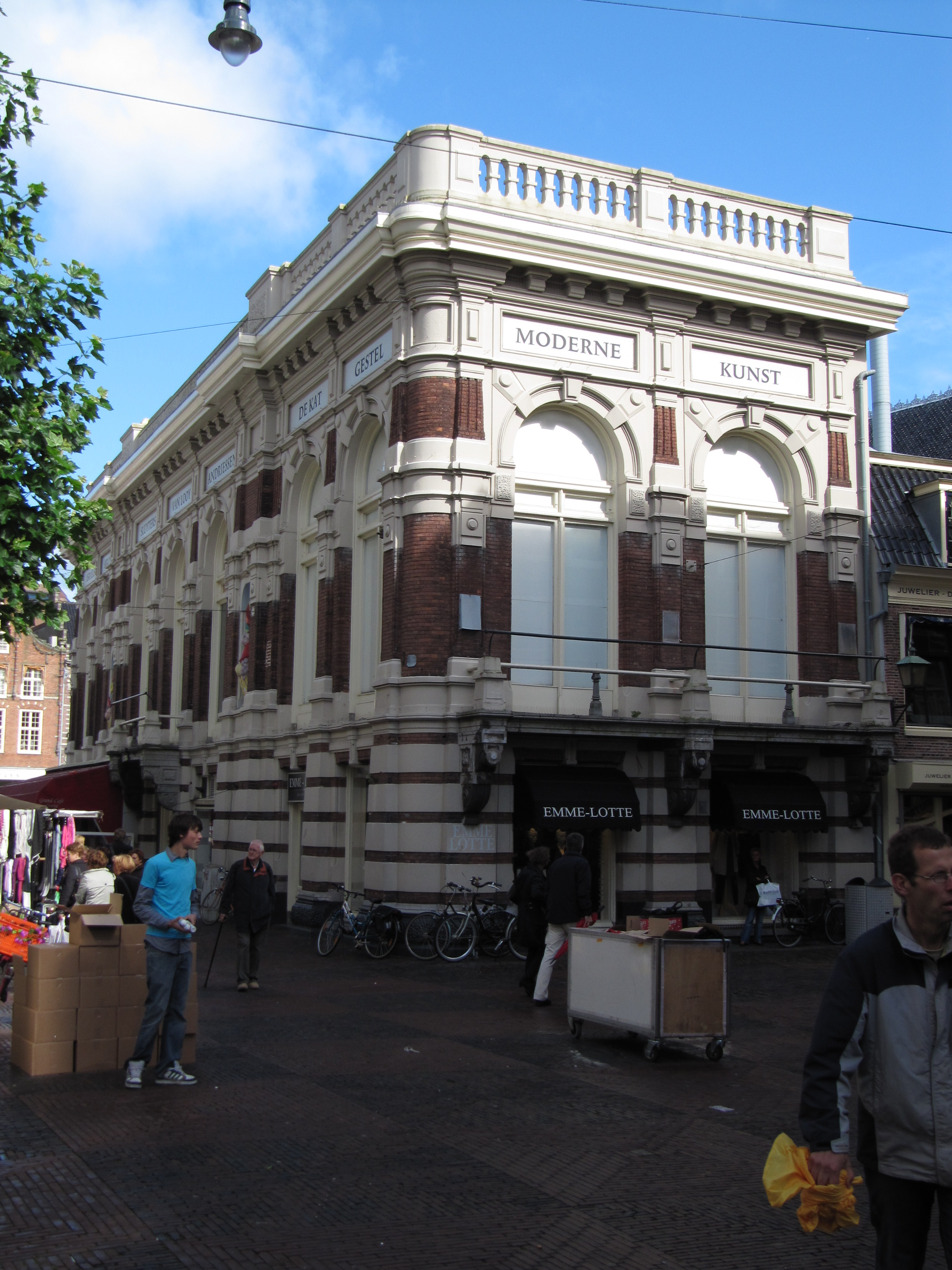
Verwey hall from the Grote Houtstraat looking north. The street level is in use by shops and a restaurant, and the upper levels are accessible from the entrance near the Vleeshal. Along the top of the facade are the words "Modern Art" and the names of Haarlem artists Israëls, Kruyder, Sluyters, Van Looy, Andriessen, De Kat and Gestel.

The Verweyhal is an exhibition space next to the Vleeshal on the Grote Markt, Haarlem. The Verweyhal was built in the 19th century as a gentlemen's society of the former drama society, later a cultural social club, Trou moet Blycken.

In the second half of the 19th century the earlier building of the drama society, which was on the same spot, was too small. In 1876 the society held a competition for a new design. The Amsterdam architect A.J. van Beek won, and his plan was carried out with the help of local builder A. Raasveld. The building was occupied in 1880. The building is in the Eclectic style that was very popular at the end of the 19th century in Haarlem, but later fell out of fashion. In the first half of the 20th century, the building received a great deal of criticism. It was considered much too large and pompous. ‘An object of general contempt,’ according to the description of the distinguished gentlemen's society.

Almost immediately, the gentleman's society had financial problems. Perhaps the building project had been a bit too prestigious. The gentlemen initially tried to alleviate the situation by raising their membership contribution. That did not help, because the number of members declined. As the increased contribution did not solve the problem, the ground floor was rented out as a shop. This income did not help either, and in 1922 the gentlemen were forced to sell the building to the city, which became the new owner for 125,000 guilders, and they moved to their current premises further down the Grote Houtstraat at number 115.

The society building was converted in 1924 into the Spaarnebank. The safe was on the ground floor; offices were set up on the first floor. The building was called ‘an unsuccessful box of blocks’ in 1947 by the engineer G. Friedhoff, who wanted to demolish the building and replace it with traditional façades.

More renovations were carried out in 1978 when the first floor was remodelled to house the Department of Cultural Affairs, the local City Planning Authority and the office of the City Architect.

Fourteen years later, in 1992, the building was renovated again as a future exhibition hall to house the collection of the Haarlem artist Kees Verwey. With support from his newly formed Kees Verwey Foundation, the first floor received a new name: the Verweyhal. The former city architect Wiek Röling made a design for the new layout together with architect Jan Bernard.

Opinions about the building changed in the 1970s, and for the first time, words of praise were heard. Today, the building is an official monument and still has a museological function.

The entrance today to the upper exhibition floors is through Museum De Hallen, Haarlem on the Grote Markt and no longer through the original main entrance on the Grote Houtstraat.
