= Kletskop =

Type of cookie in the Netherlands and Belgium

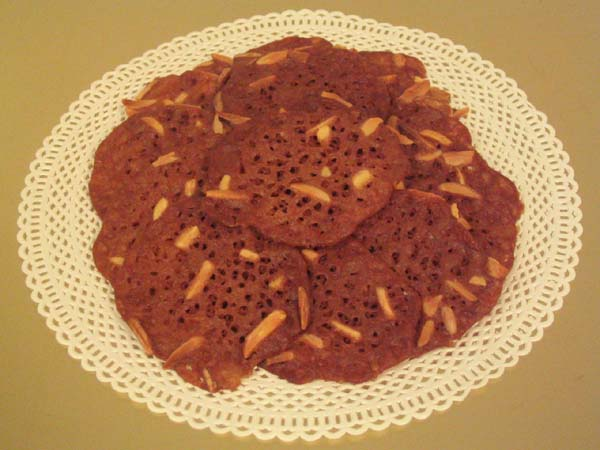
- Type: cookie
- Place of origin: Netherlands
- Main ingredients: sugar, almond, butter
- Variations: kaaskletskop (with cheese)

A kletskop (plural: kletskoppen) is a traditional Dutch and Belgian lace cookie, characterized by its ultra-thin, crisp texture and caramelized flavor, typically made from butter, sugar, flour, cinnamon, and nuts (usually almonds or peanuts).

== History ==
The modern name kletskop evolved from the earlier official name kanteling, later nicknamed schorftenhoofd (“scurf head”), a reference to the cookie's bumpy, caramel-crusted appearance that resembled the rough texture of diseased skin of a scalp affliction common among children known as favus. This was later softened to kletskop, literally "bald head" in Dutch, as the disease caused baldness.

In 16th century Dutch city of Leiden, the cookie was used as a part of the Leiden bakers’ guild master baker’s trial. The earliest known literary mention of the cookie is in a 1602 poem by Flemish writer Zacharias Heyns referencing the Leiden delicacy as schorftenhoofden (“scurf heads”). In the 19th-century Belgian towns like Bruges and Veurne also claim origin of the kletskop, but Dutch records predate these.

== Serving ==
Kletskop is typically served with coffee or tea, and are also used as a decorative crisp element in desserts (e.g., ice cream, pudding).

== See also ==
- Tuile (France)
- Florentines (France/Italy)
