= Frans Pietersz de Grebber =

Dutch Golden Age painter (1573 – 1649)

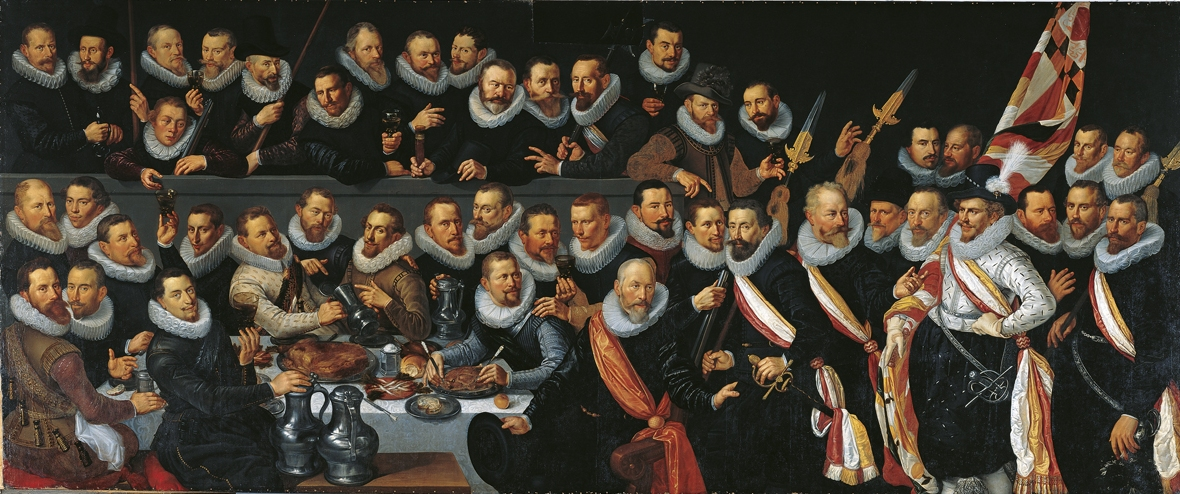
- Cloveniers schutterij Haarlem - Frans Pietersz. de Grebber (1619)
- Born: 1573
- Died: 6 March 1649 (aged 75–76)
- Occupation: Painter, drawer

Frans Pieterszoon (abbr. Pietersz.) de Grebber (1573 – 1649) was a Dutch Golden Age painter.

== Biography ==
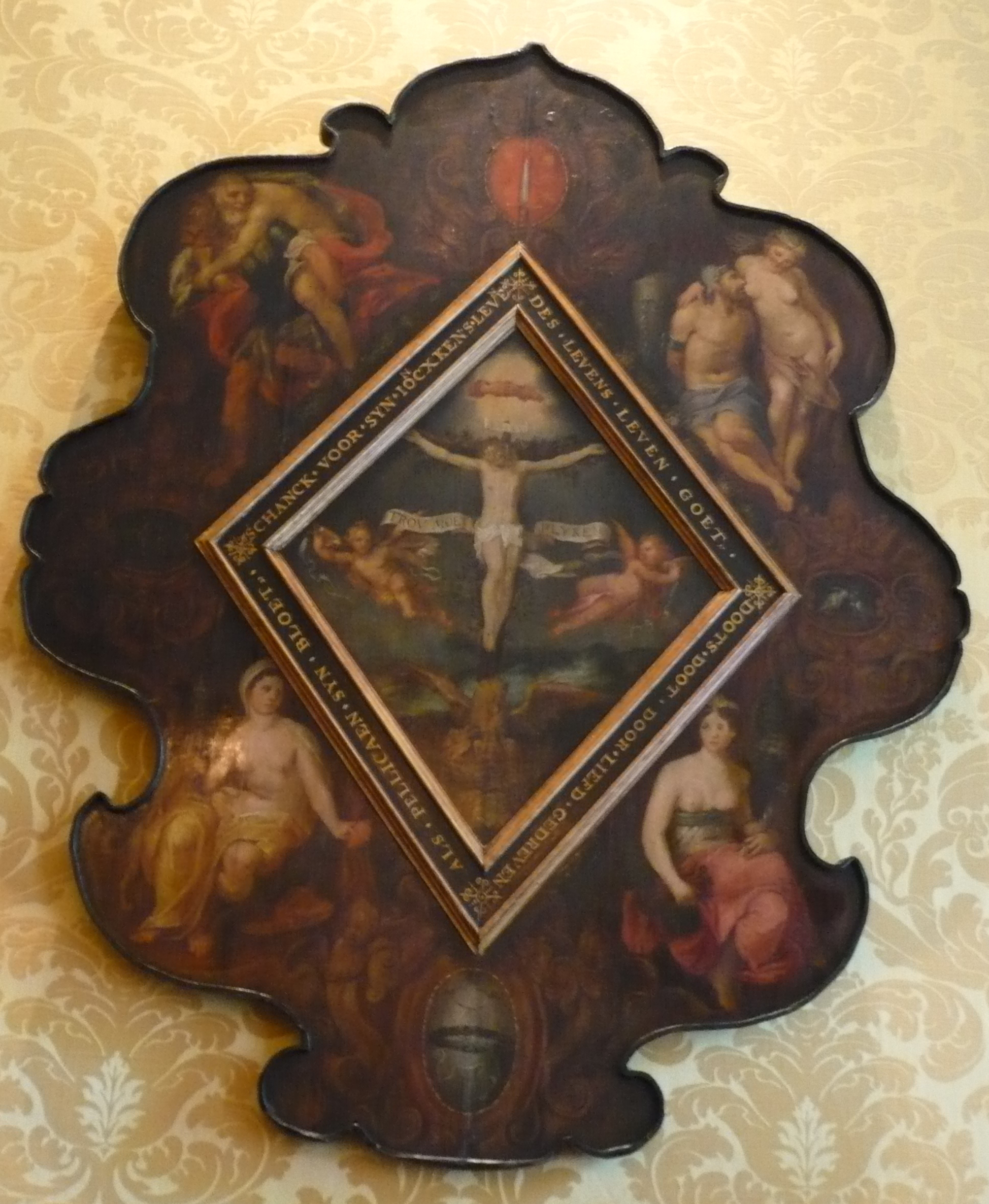
Blazoen of Trou moet Blycken painted from a design by Goltzius

Frans Pietersz de Grebber was born and died in Haarlem. He belonged to the ancient De Grebber family originally from Waterland, and was the son of Pieter Mourings de Grebber (died 1598). Frans Pietersz de Grebber and his brother inherit the assets of his uncle Adriaen Mourings de Grebber, steward of the Leeuwenhorst monastery near Noordwijkerhout.

According to van Mander De Grebber was a good painter of landscapes and portraits, who designed tapestries and had been a pupil of Jacob Savery. According to Houbraken, he had two children who were notable painters; Pieter de Grebber, who outshone his father, and Maria de Grebber, who was good with buildings and perspective.

According to the RKD he became a member of the Haarlem Guild of St. Luke around 1600 and remained an important citizen in Haarlem until his death. Besides his children, he taught the painters Vincent Casteleyn, Peter Lely, Judith Leyster, and Pieter Saenredam.

According to the archives of the Haarlem chamber of rhetoric called Trouw moet Blycken, he painted their best blazon from a design by Goltzius.
