= Pieter de Grebber =

Dutch Golden Age painter (c. 1600–1652/3)

- Born: 1600
- Died: 1652 (aged 51–52)
- Occupation: Painter

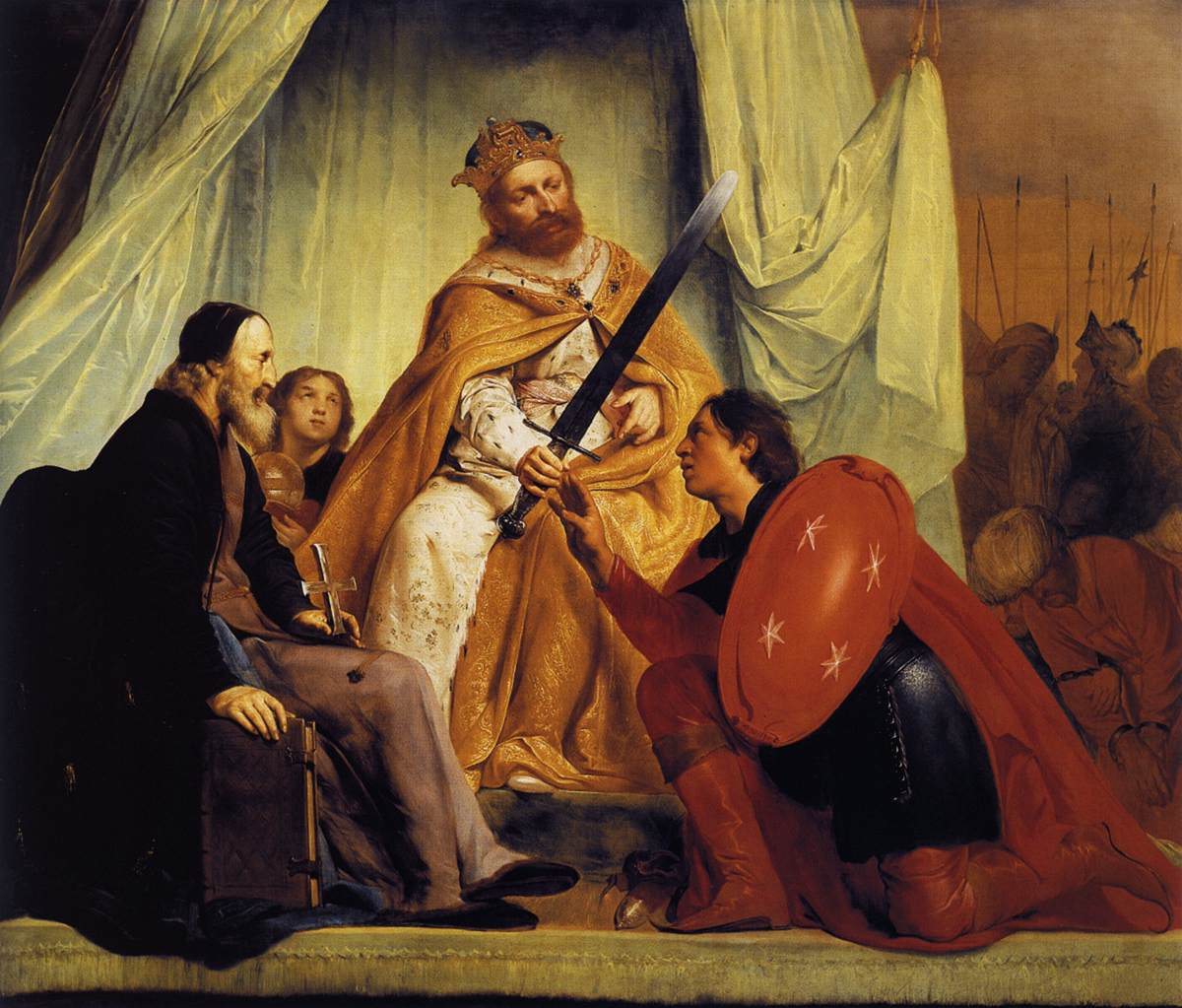
Haarlem receives a sword for its shield from the Holy Roman Emperor in thanks for the Christian victory in Damietta during the Fifth Crusade. Scene is now referred to as "the legend of the Haarlem shield", 1630 (Frans Hals Museum)

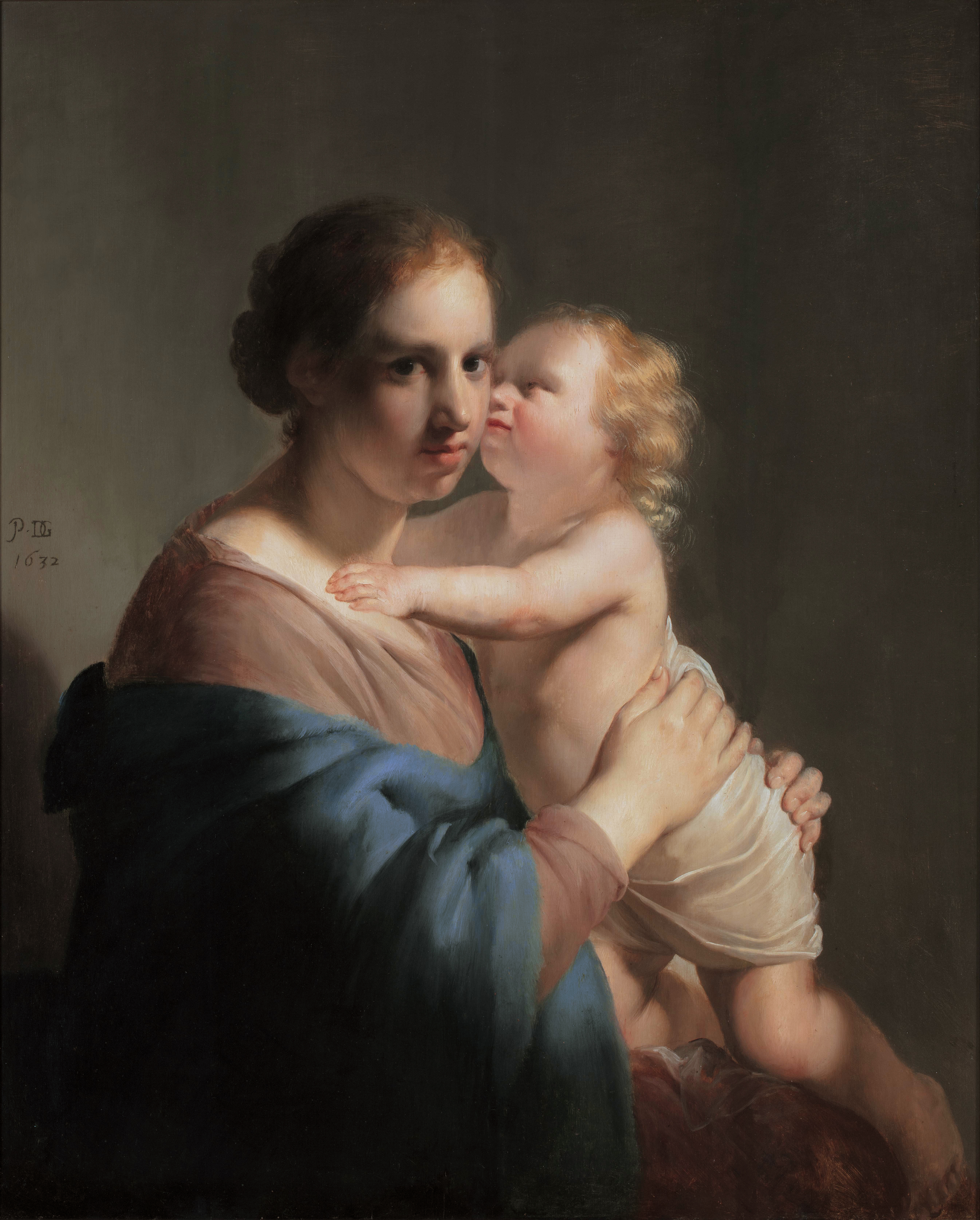
The Madonna with the Christ Child (1632)

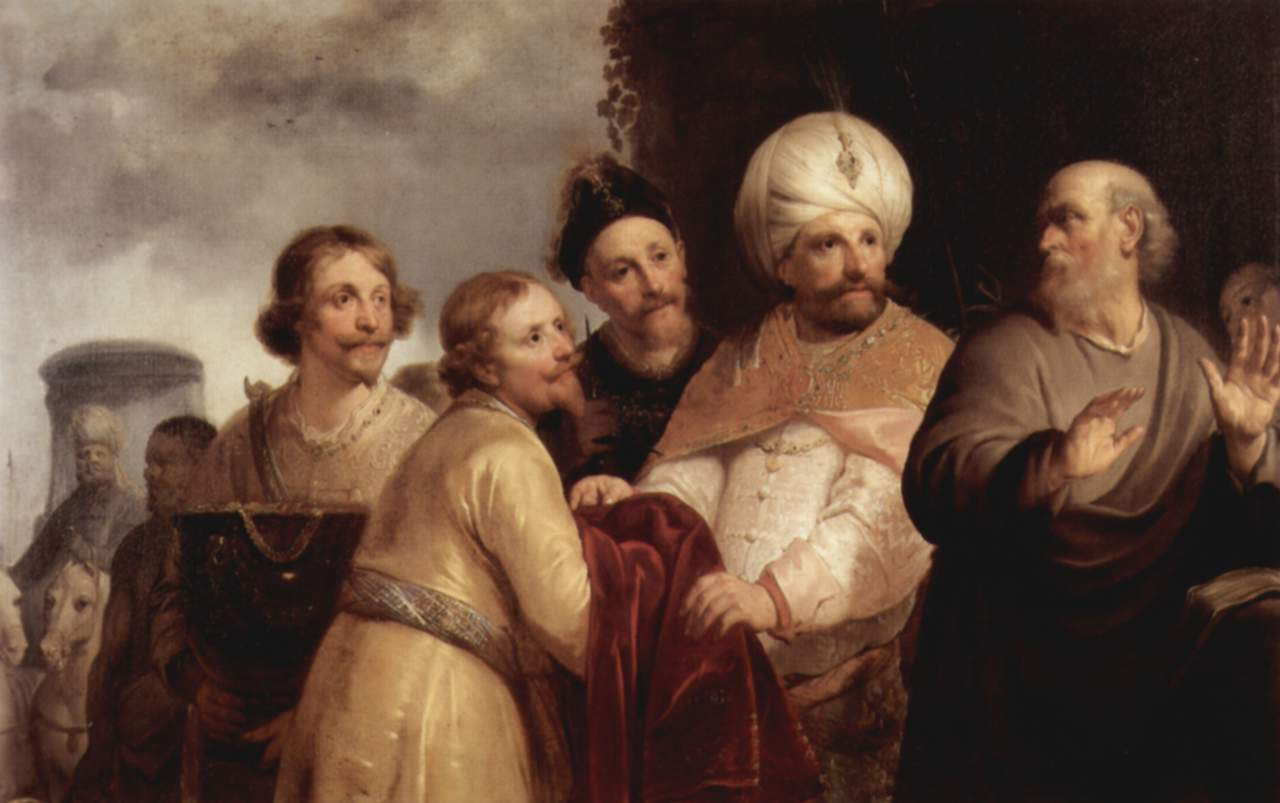
Elisha (on the right) refusing the gifts of Naaman (1637)

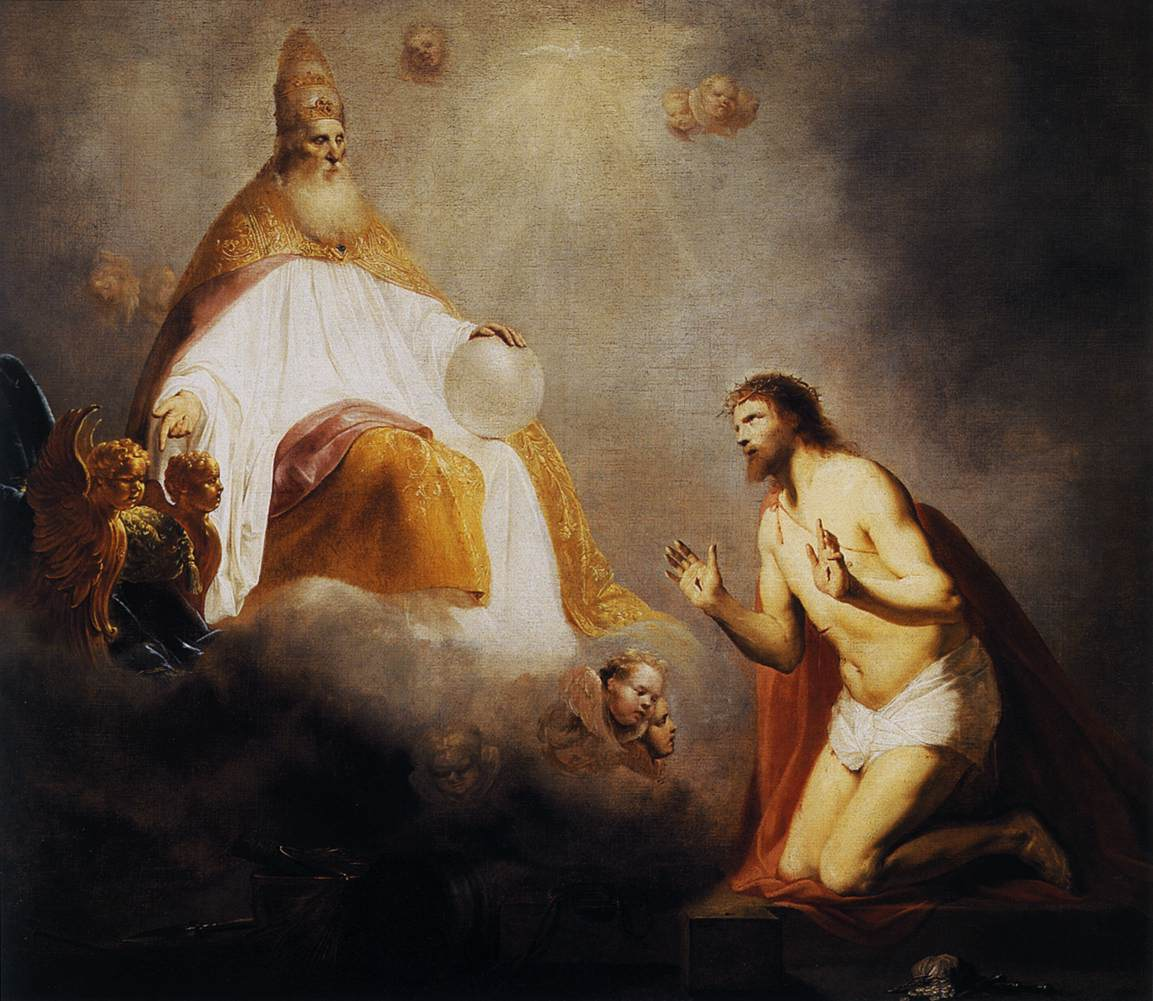
God Inviting Christ to Sit on the Throne at His Right Hand, painting (1645). The Holy Spirit is visible as a dove at the top of the image.

Pieter Fransz de Grebber (c.1600–1652/3) was a Dutch Golden Age painter.

== Life ==
De Grebber was born in Haarlem, the oldest son of Frans Pietersz de Grebber (1573–1643), a painter and embroiderer in Haarlem, and the brother of the painters Maria and Albert. He learned to paint from his father and from Hendrick Goltzius. He was descended from a Catholic and artistic family, the De Grebbers, originally from Waterland, and his sister Maria later became the mother-in-law of Gabriel Metsu. He was a friend of the priest and musicologist Jan Albertszoon Ban, and had a poem set to music by the Haarlem composer Cornelis Padbrué. In 1632 he became a member of the Haarlem Guild of St. Luke, but he had already been active as a painter for 10 years. His pupils were Gerbrand Ban, Nicolaes Pietersz Berchem, Egbert van Heemskerck, and Dirck Helmbreeker.

In 1618, father and son went to Antwerp and negotiated with Peter Paul Rubens over the sale of his painting Daniel in the Lions Pit. It was then handed - via the English ambassador in the Republic, Sir Dudley Carleton - to king Charles I. Pieter got important commissions not only in Haarlem, but also from the stadholder Frederik Hendrik. As such, he worked on the decoration of the Huis Honselaarsdijk in Naaldwijk and at the Paleis Noordeinde in Huis ten Bosch in the Hague. He painted altar pieces for churches in Flanders and hidden Catholic churches in the Republic. He may also have worked for Danish clients.

Pieter remained single and lived from 1634 until his death at the Haarlem Béguinage.

== Work ==
Besides history paintings, Pieter de Grebber also painted a number of portraits; furthermore many drawings and a few etchings by him have survived. From different influences, such as the Utrecht Caravaggistism, Rubens and also Rembrandt, he came up with a very personal style. He was, together with Salomon de Bray, the forerunner and first peak of the "Haarlem classicism" school, producing paintings characterised by a well-organised clarity and light tints.

In 1649, De Grebber wrote the treatise "Regulen welcke by een goet Schilder en Teyckenaar geobserveert en achtervolght moeten werden" (Rules which a good Painter and Master of Drawing should observe). In this document he explains the most important eleven rules which he believes classicist painters should be careful to observe. Although the Classicists did not swear by such rules, these were nevertheless always tightly observed. Almost all of these rules are taken from Karel van Mander's own Mannerist Schilder-boeck, in which history painting was presented as the highest of the hierarchy of genres.
