= Maria de Grebber =

Dutch Golden Age painter (1602–1680)

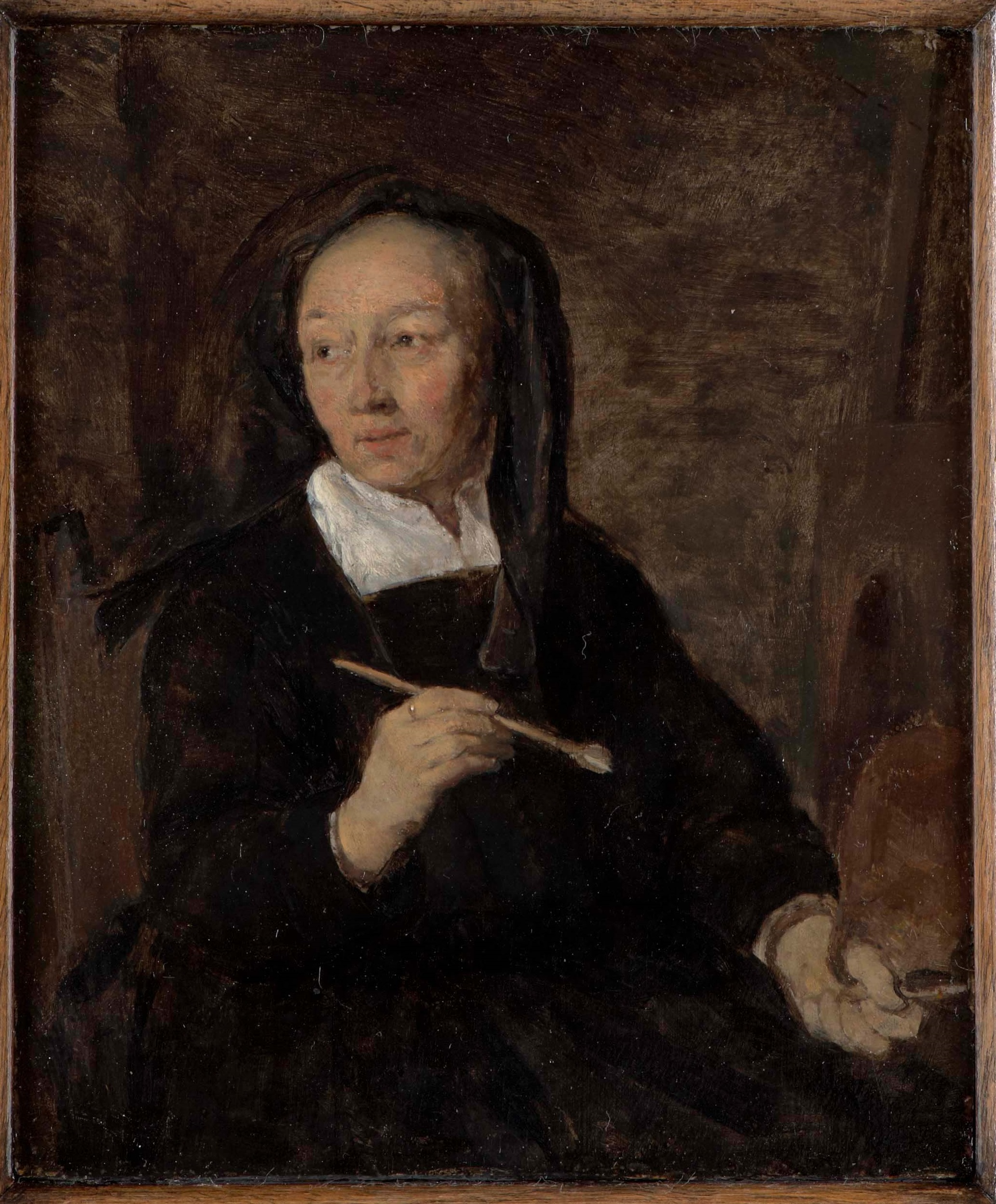
Supposed portrait of Maria de Grebber at her easel by her son-in-law Gabriel Metsu, c. 1660

Maria de Grebber (1602, Haarlem – 1680, Enkhuizen), was a Dutch Golden Age painter. Grebber was talented at depicting buildings and perspective.

Maria worked in her family workshop and thus did not need professional qualifications to obtain sales.

== Life and career ==
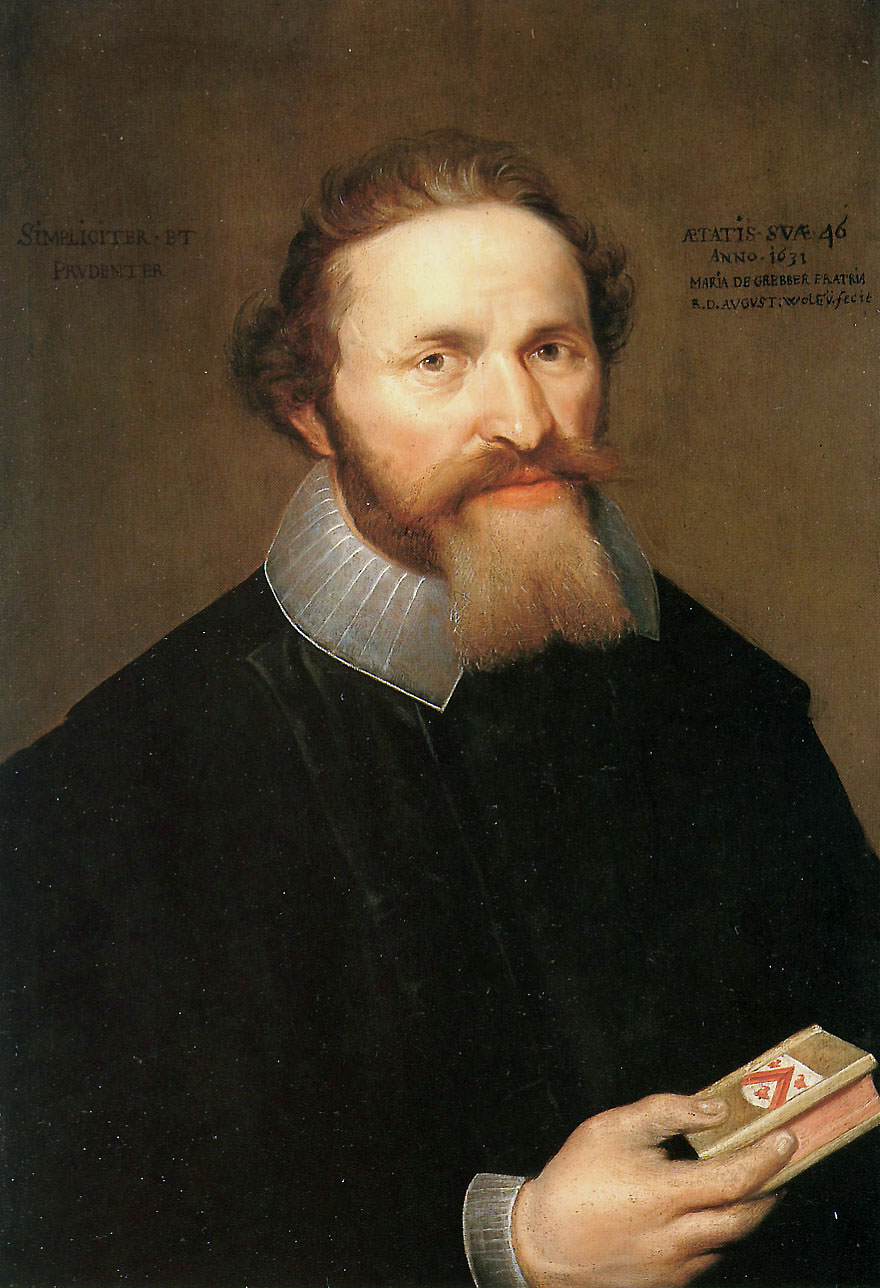
Portrait of Augustinus de Wolff, the brother-in-law of the artist

Maria de Grebber was the daughter of the painter Frans Pietersz de Grebber and the sister of Pieter de Grebber. She belonged to the ancient De Grebber family originally from Waterland. Their father ran a respected workshop in Haarlem in the 1620s, where he taught Judith Leyster and his own children how to paint.

Maria was not the only female painter in Haarlem. The first woman registered in the Haarlem Guild of St. Luke was Sara van Baalbergen in 1631, and Leyster was a member by 1633. Both women were not members of an established artist family in Haarlem, the way Maria was.

She was seven years older than Leyster and, like Leyster and Baalbergen, married an artist, the faience baker Wouter Coenraetsz de Wolff. Her daughter Isabelle de Wolff later married the painter Gabriel Metsu.

== See also ==
- Geertruydt Roghman
