= Grote Markt (Haarlem) =

Main square of Haarlem, the Netherlands

Coordinates: 52°22′52.92″N 4°38′9.26″E

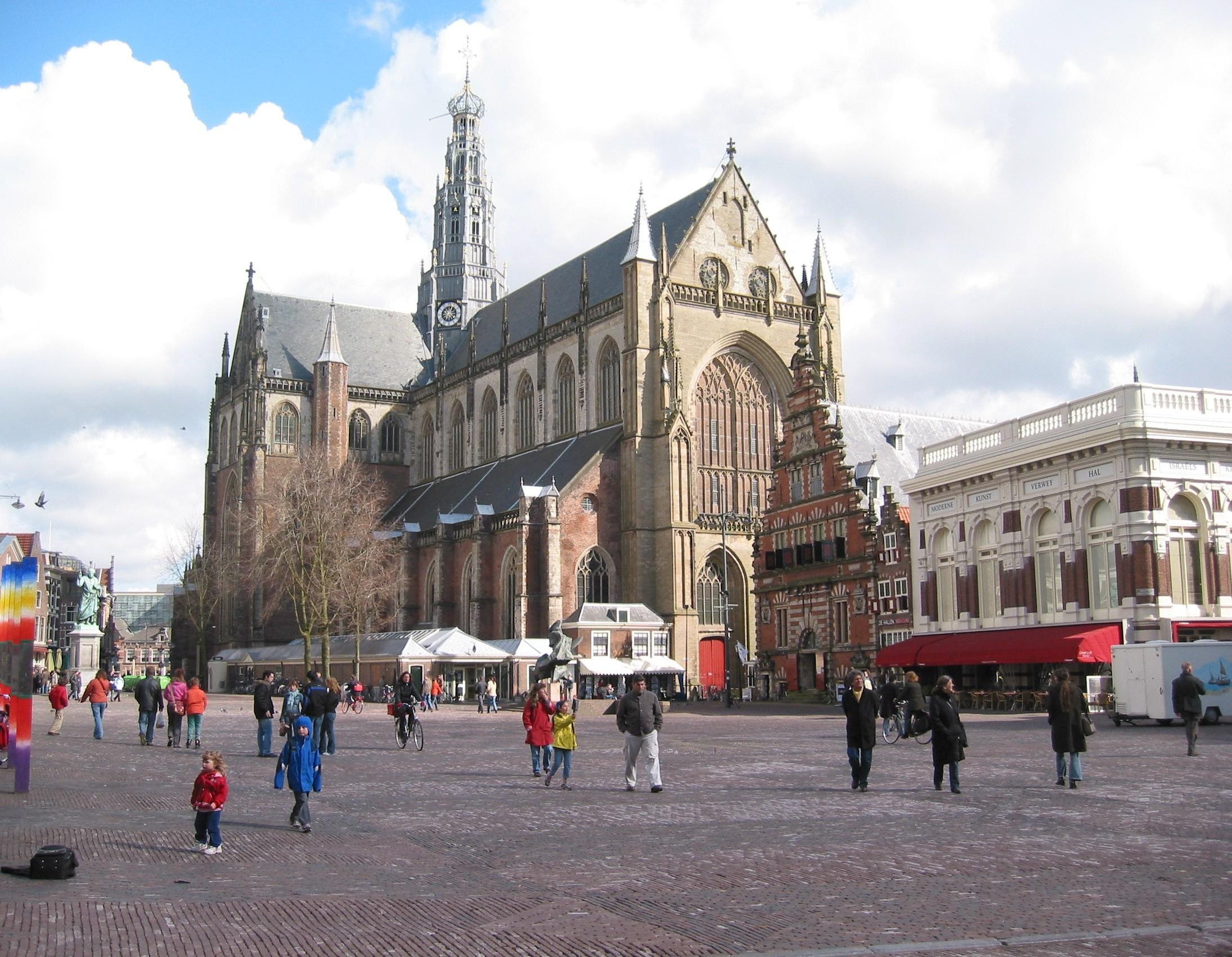
The Grote Markt in Haarlem with the Sint-Bavokerk. In the shadow of the church on the northern side is the former fish market. On the left is the statue of Laurens Janszoon Coster and on the right are the Vleeshal and the Verweyhal.

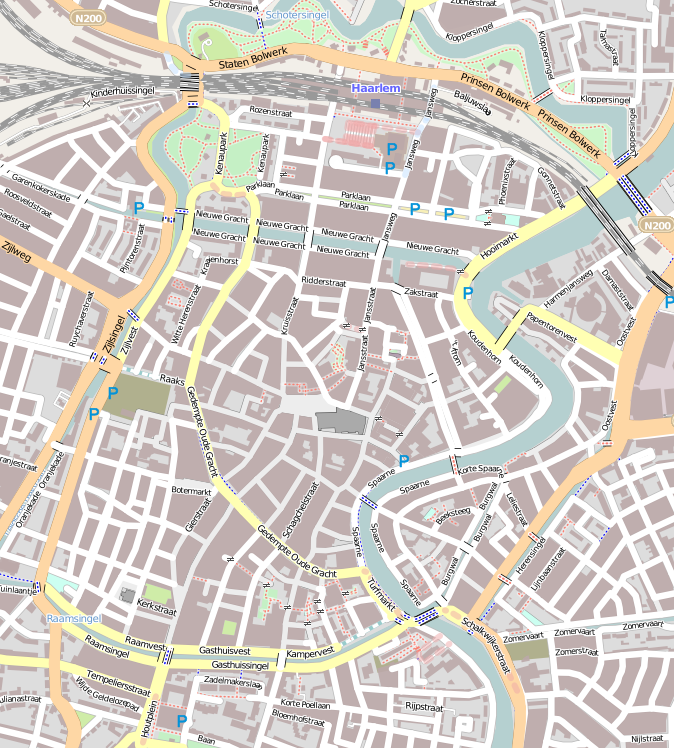
The Grote Markt is in the centre of Haarlem, with the City Hall across from the St. Bavochurch

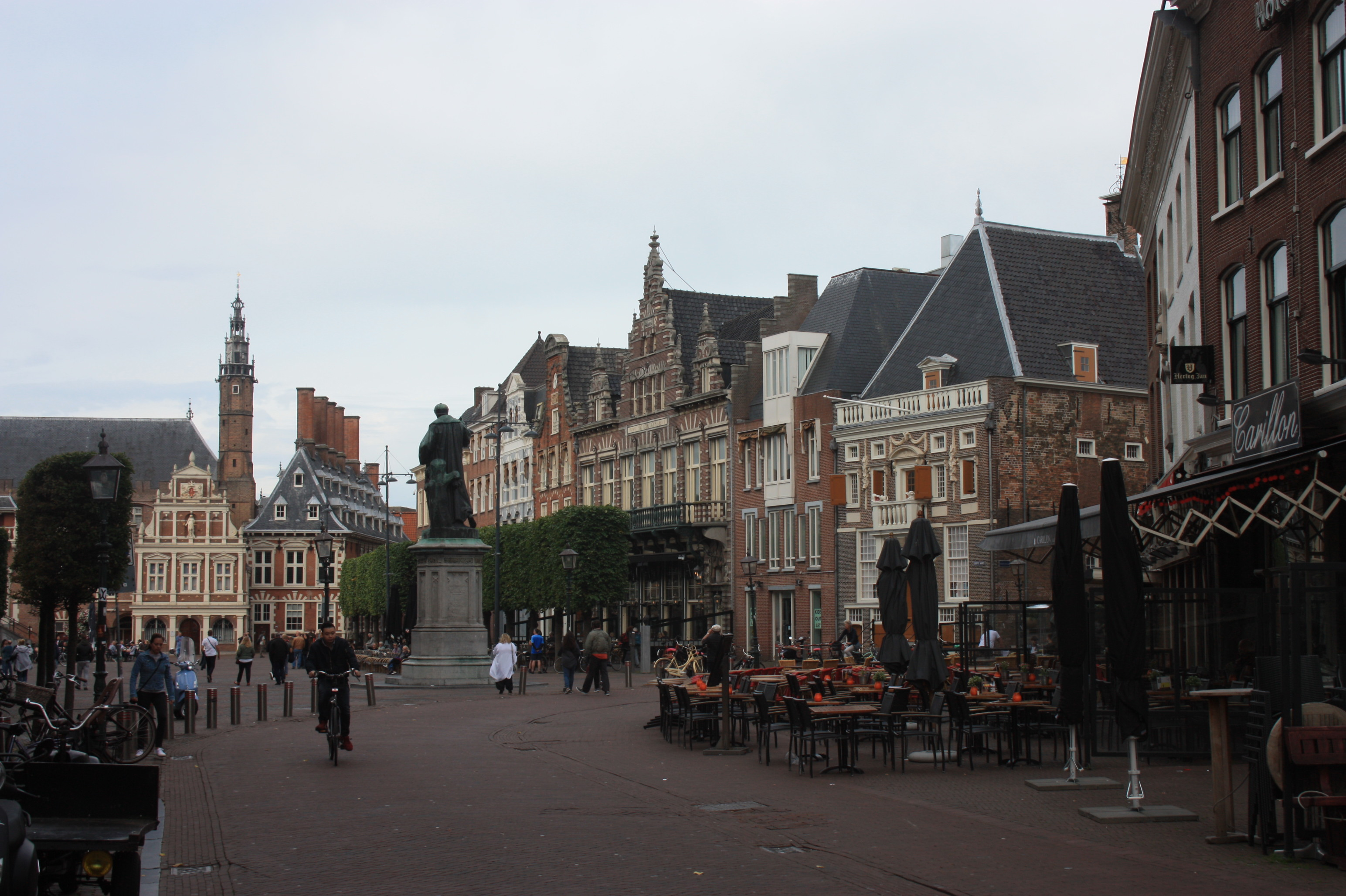
The north side of Grote Markt, Haarlem, looking west

The Grote Markt (Dutch: [ˌɣroːtə ˈmɑr(ə)kt]; "Big Market") is the central market square of Haarlem, Netherlands.

According to the 1911 Encyclopædia Britannica;

In the great market place in the centre of the city are gathered together the larger number of the most interesting buildings, including the quaint old Fleshers' Hall, built by Lieven de Key in 1603, and now containing the archives; the town hall; the old Stadsdoelen, where the burgesses met in arms; the Groote Kerk, or Great Church; and the statue erected in 1856 to Laurens Janszoon Koster, the printer. The Great Church, dedicated to St Bavo, with a lofty tower (255 ft.), is one of the most famous in Holland, and dates from the end of the 15th and the beginning of the 16th centuries. Its great length (460 ft.) and the height and steepness of its vaulted cedar-wood roof (1538) are very impressive. ... In the belfry are the damiaatjes, small bells presented to the town, according to tradition, by William I, Count of Holland (d. 1222), the crusader. The town hall was originally a palace of the counts of Holland, begun in the 12th century, and some old 13th-century beams still remain; but the building was remodelled in the beginning of the 17th century. It contains a collection of antiquities (including some beautiful goblets) and a picture gallery which, though small, is celebrated for its fine collection of paintings by Frans Hals.

— Encyclopædia Britannica article on Haarlem, 1911,

== Buildings of interest ==
- Frans Hals Museum - Hal
- Grote Kerk, Haarlem
- Haarlem City Hall
- Statue of Johann Costerus
- Archaeological Museum of Haarlem
- The Vleeshal
- The Verweyhal
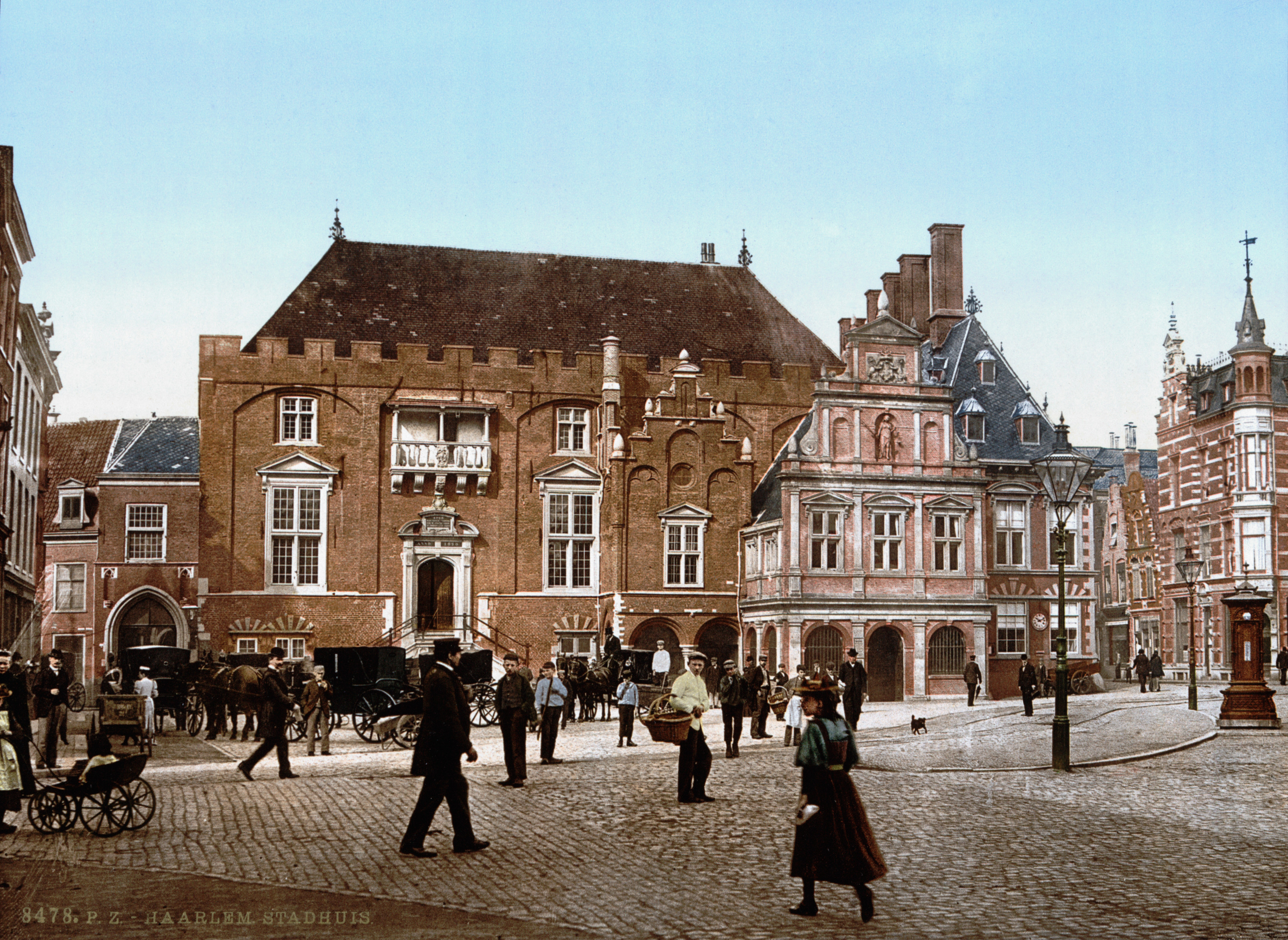
View across the market square towards the town hall in 1900
