= Trou moet Blycken =

Coordinates: 52°22′41″N 4°37′56″E

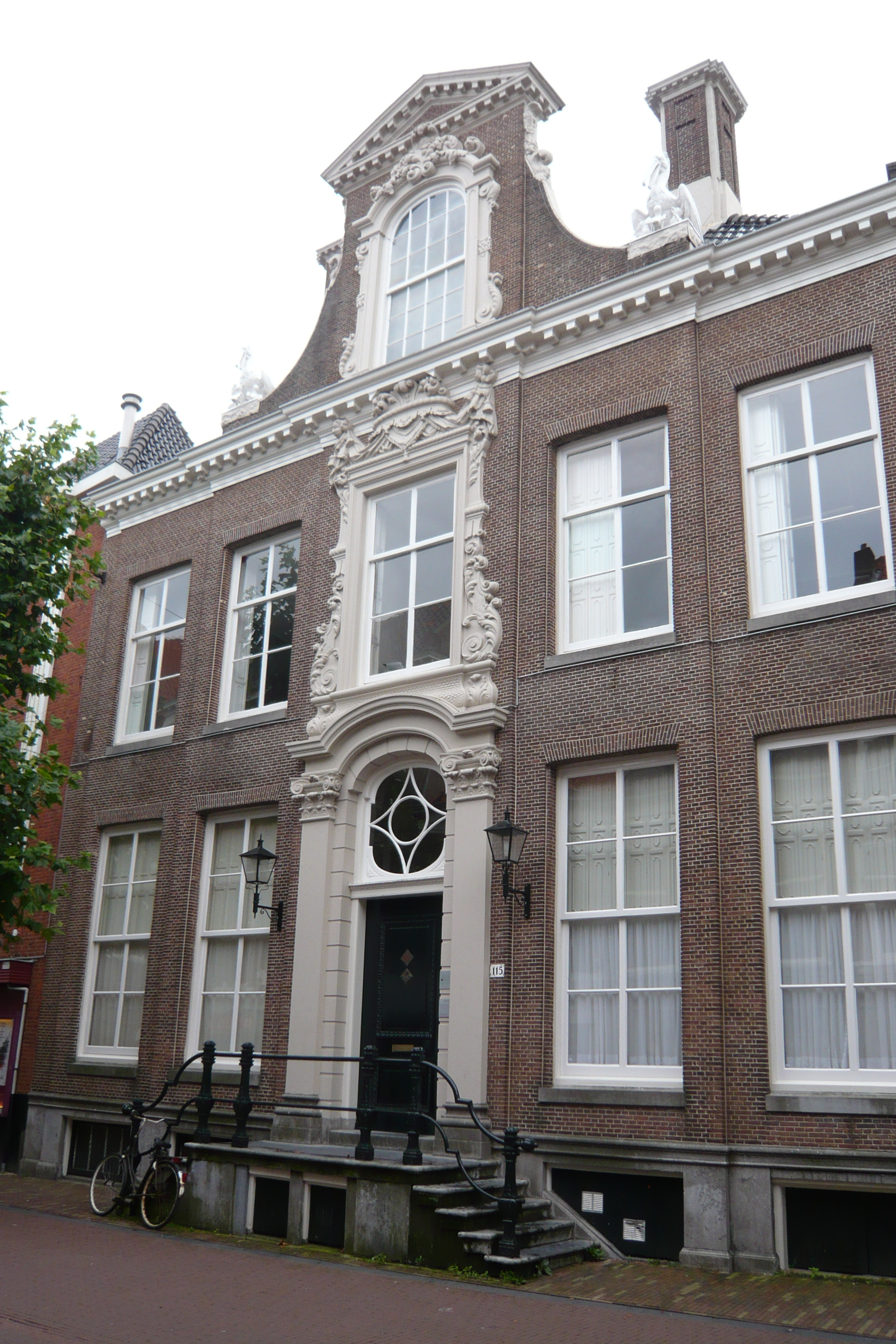
The "House with steps", seat of the "Trou Moet Blycken" Society in Haarlem.

Trou moet Blycken (lit. "[the] faithful must show") is a historical chamber of rhetoric over 500 years old and currently a gentlemen's club located in the middle of a busy shopping area on the Grote Houtstraat in Haarlem, Netherlands.

== History ==
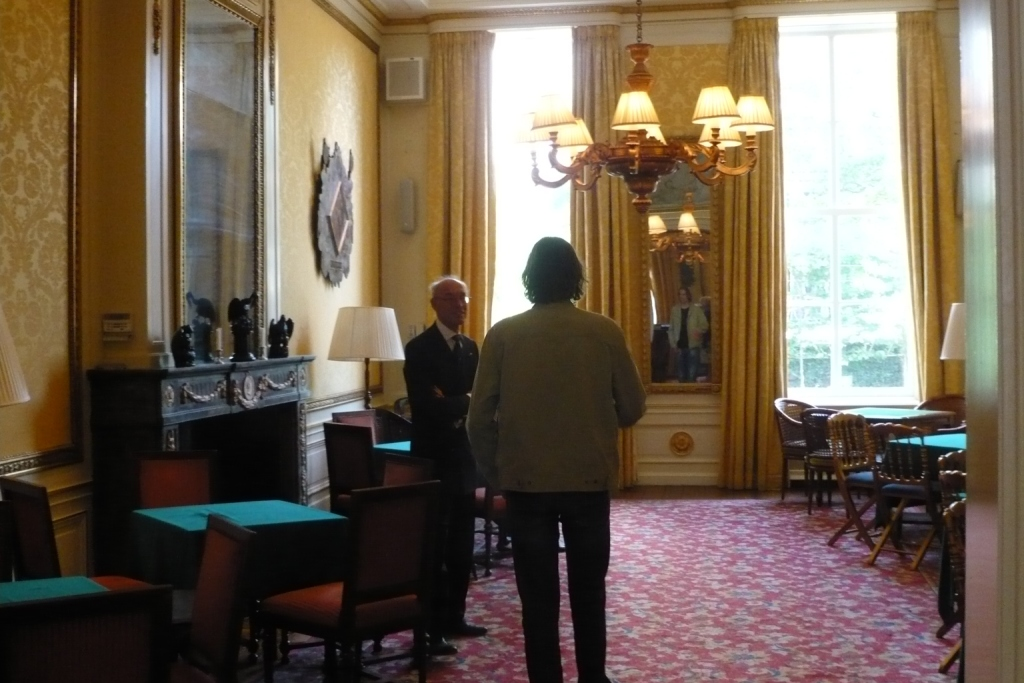
Pieter Biesboer, former curator of the Frans Hals Museum, art historian, and member, receives visitors on Open Monuments Day, September, 2010.

Though the society probably goes back earlier in time, the earliest document from the archives shows that it definitely was mentioned by name in 1503, so this has been historically used as the year of establishment, most recently for the 500 year anniversary in 2003. This was not the only chamber of rhetoric in Haarlem; The Haarlem painters Job Adriaenszoon Berckheyde and Salomon de Bray were members of the chamber called 'De Wijngaardranken'. The club has kept most of its rich archive and paraphernalia and often collaborates with local institutions such as the Frans Hals Museum, the Historisch Museum Haarlem and the Noord-Hollands Archief to display some of their rich cultural artifacts of theater life in Haarlem and of the broader low countries of the 17th-century. Most notable is the lottery and rhetoric contest that the club hosted in 1609 which involved several chambers of rhetoric who brought their "blazoen" (blason) with them as a gift, and these are still on display in the meeting hall. The club leaders commissioned a written version of the various acts held at the 1609 international contest that was written by Zacharias Heyns and published in 1607.

The front of the building is decorated with pelicans, symbolizing the blazoen of the chamber itself, a pelican feeding its young.

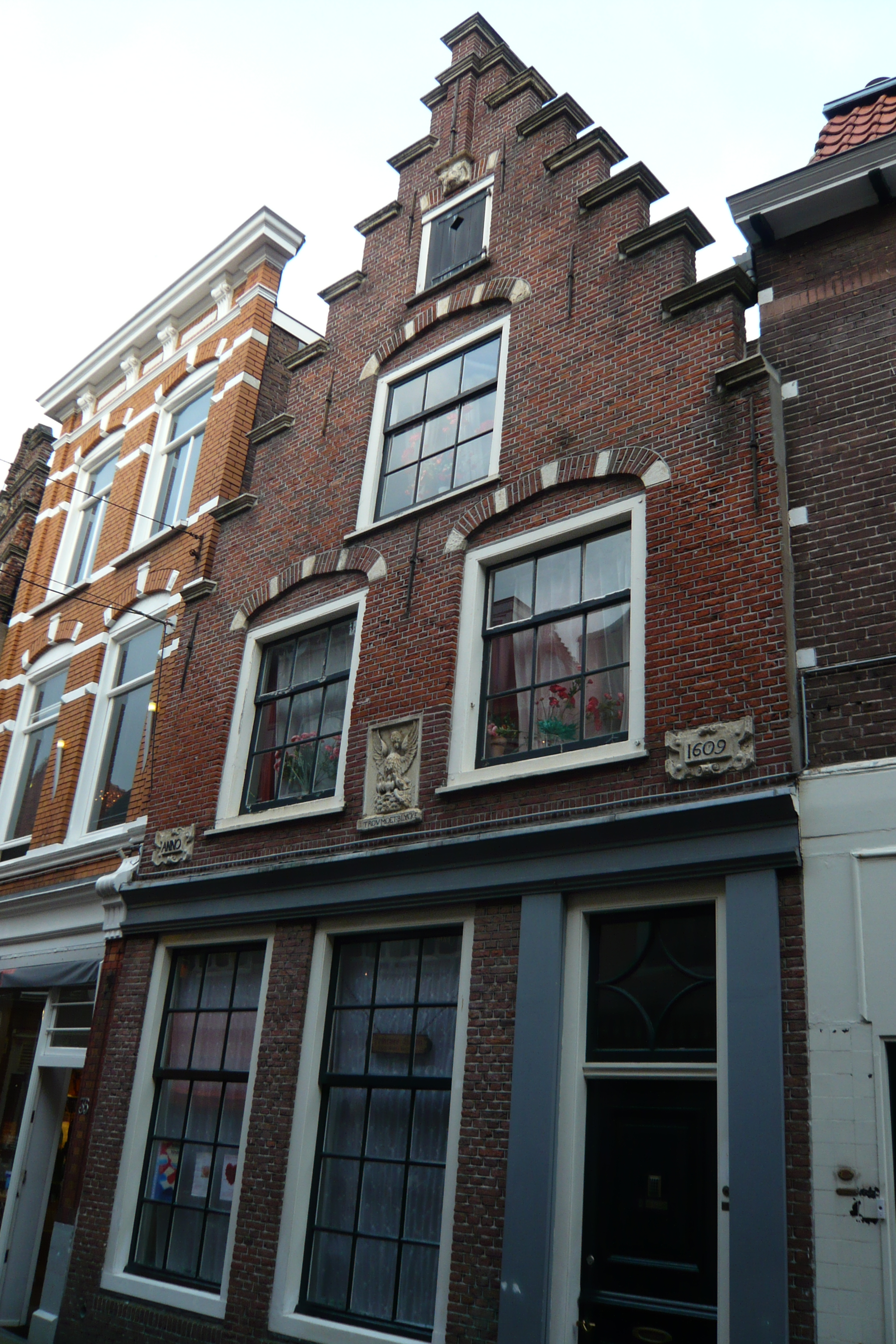
The seat of the society from 1609 until 1880. The pelican gable stone in the middle shows the blason of the club.

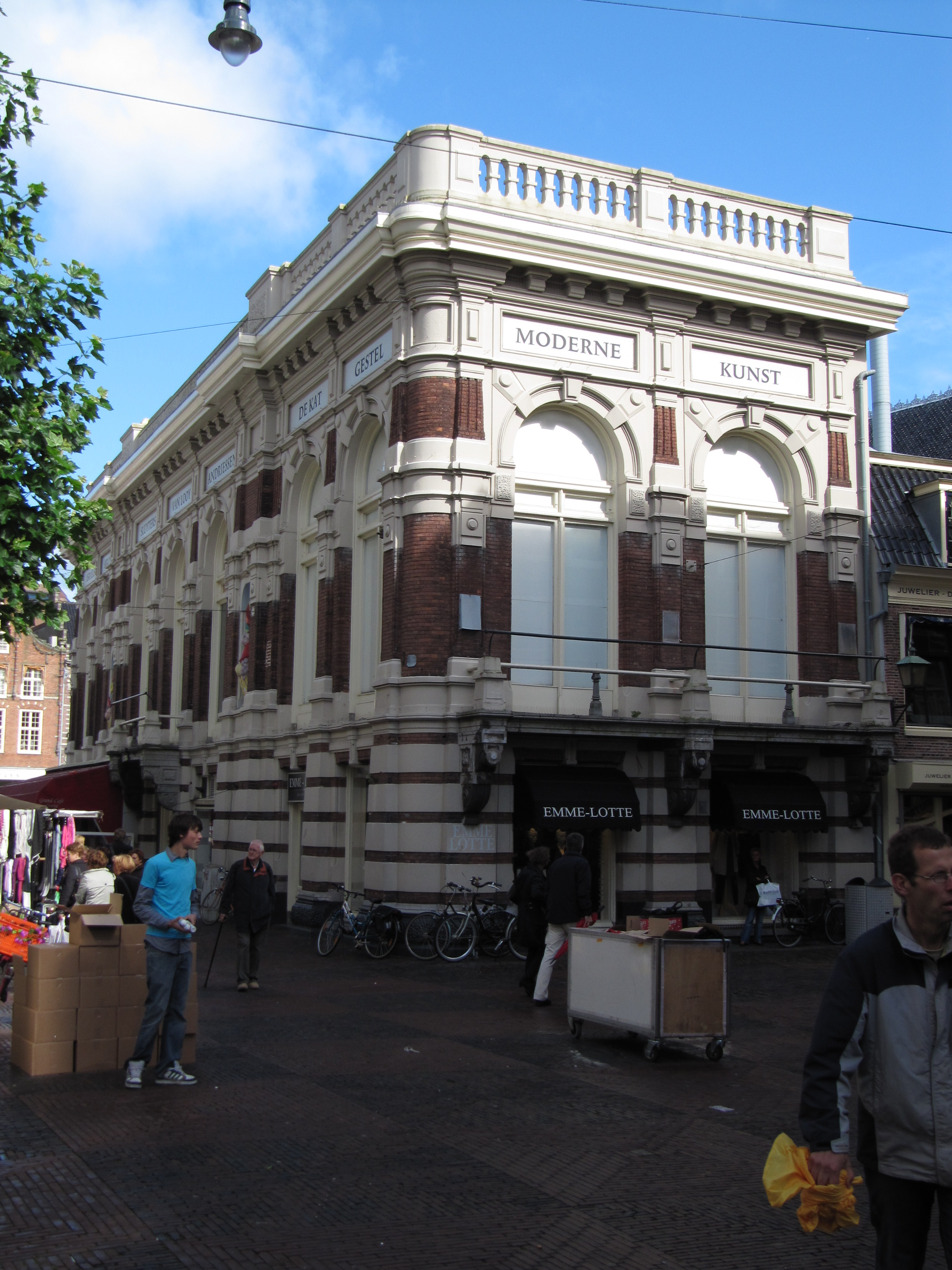
The Verweyhal was built for the society from 1876–1880, but they couldn't afford to keep it and moved to the present location instead.

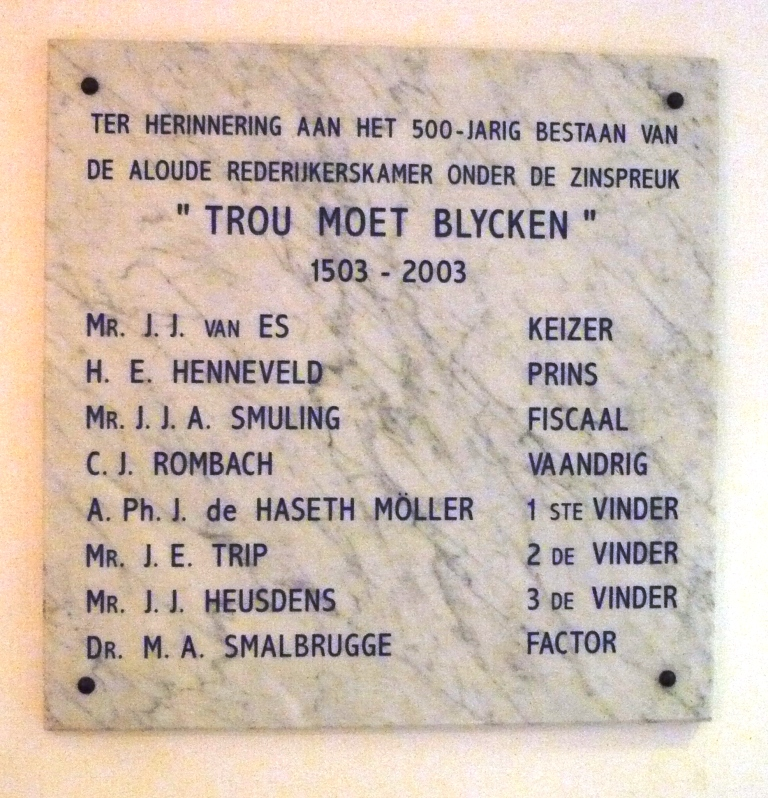
A commemorative plaque from 2003 shows the old-fashioned names for the club's board members; Emperor, Prince, Fiscaal, Flag bearer, Vinders and a Factor

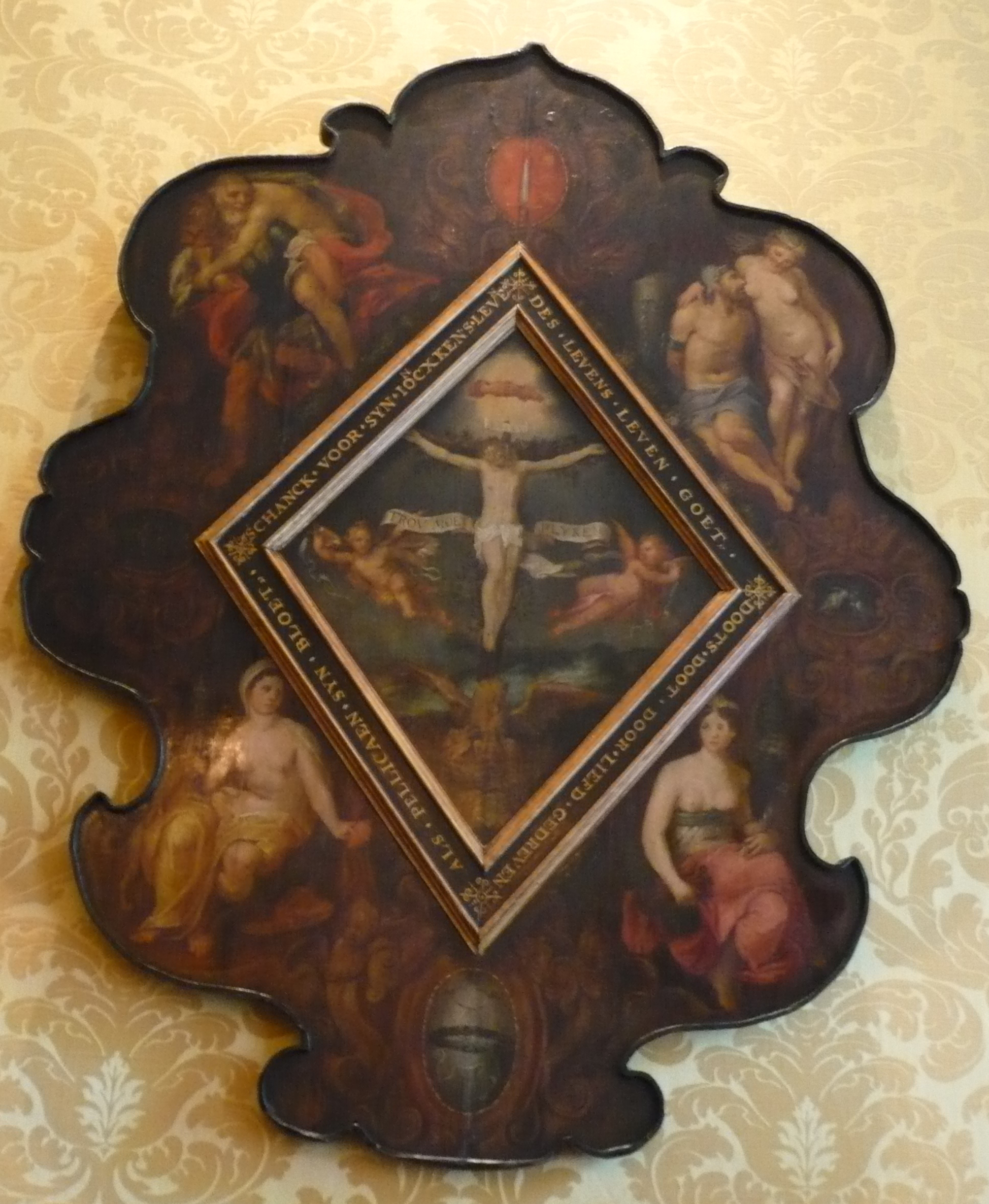
Blason of Trou Moet Blycken painted by Frans Pietersz de Grebber

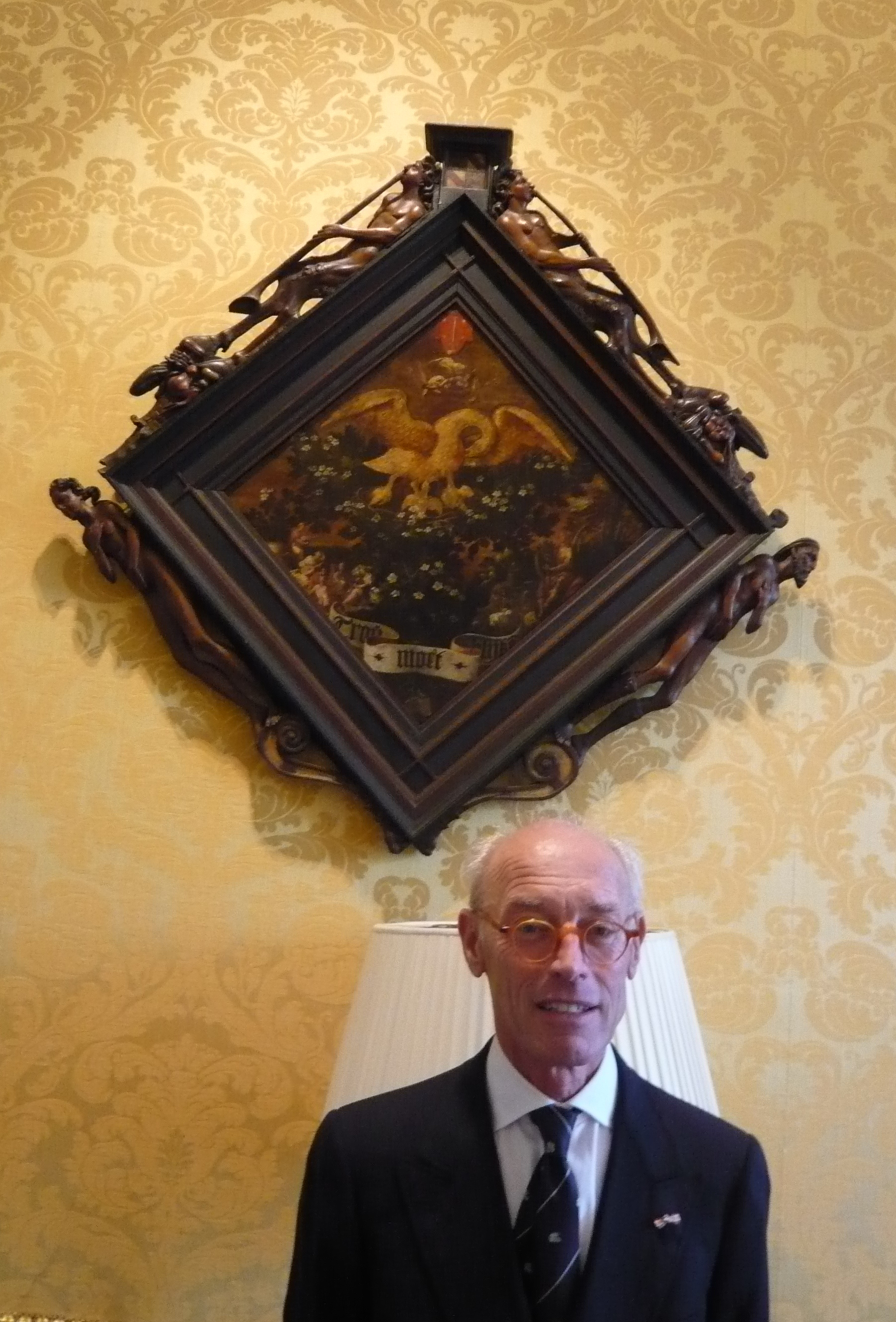
Pieter Biesboer and the Blazoen of Trou Moet Blycken painted by Jan Naghel.
