= Zacharias Heyns =

Printer and engraver from the Northern Netherlands (1566–1630)

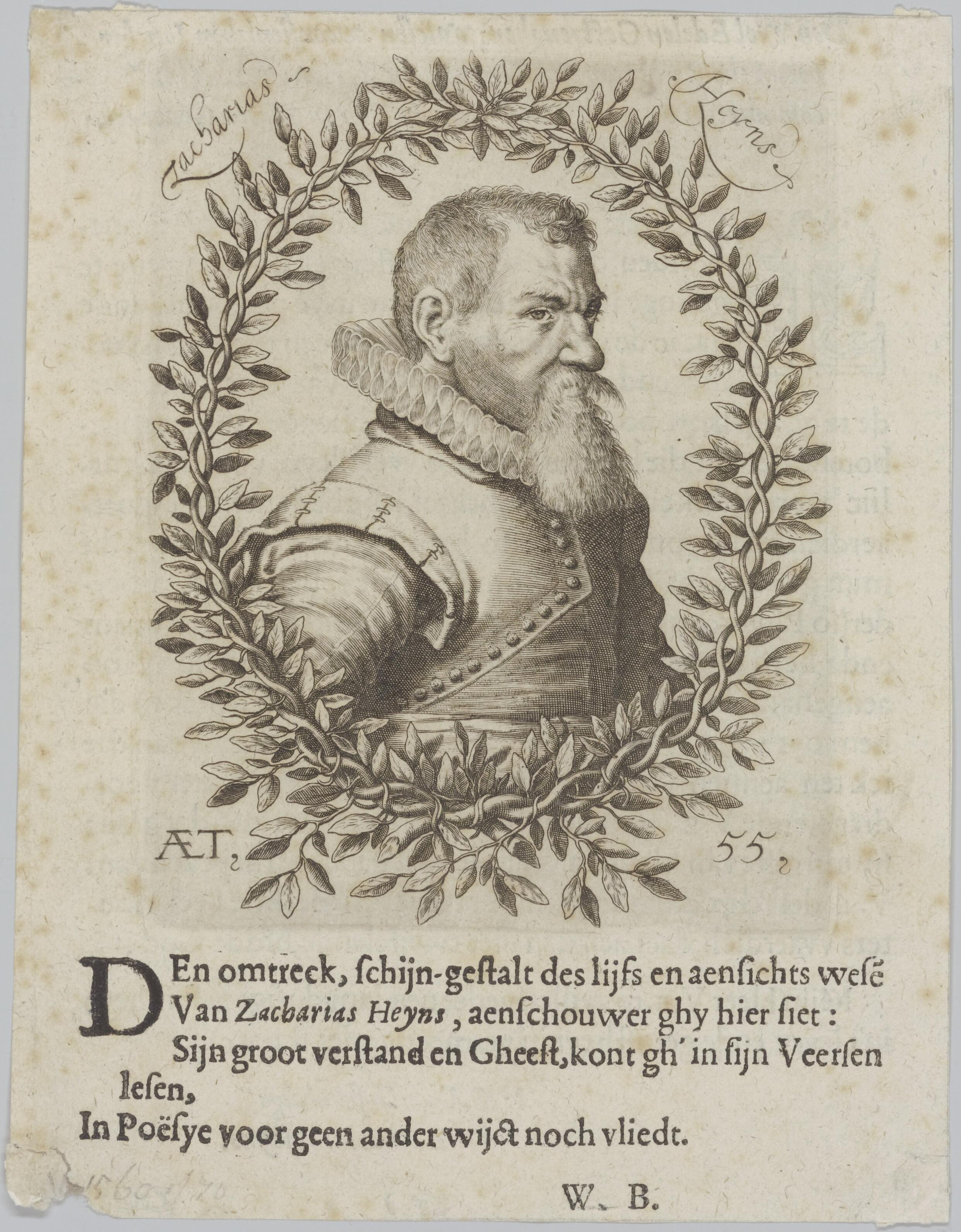
- Born: 1566; Antwerp
- Died: 1630 (aged 63–64); Zwolle

Zacharias Heyns (1566 – 1630) was a Netherlands printer and engraver from the Dutch Republic.

Heyns was born in Antwerp as the son of the schoolmaster Peeter Heyns, who was known for his French schoolbooks and translations from Dutch to French and back. The Heyns family moved to Frankfurt after the fall of Antwerp and when the elder Heyns moved to Stade in 1592, Zacharias became a publisher in Amsterdam near the Oude Kerk and married Anne Hureau. His first published works were a few Latin books by Eilhard Lubinus and schoolbooks by his father, and after his father's death he published maps of Holland with poetic comments under them in Den Nederlandtschen Landtspiegel in 1599. A copy of this book was found recently found by the Flevoland archives in a moving box originally from the Rijksdienst voor de Ijsselmeerpolders and won a contest for "archive piece of the year". In Amsterdam he became one of the founding members of the chamber of rhetoric called Wit lavender for which he wrote two plays. He became friends with many Southern Netherlands refugees in Amsterdam and Haarlem, including Karel van Mander and others.

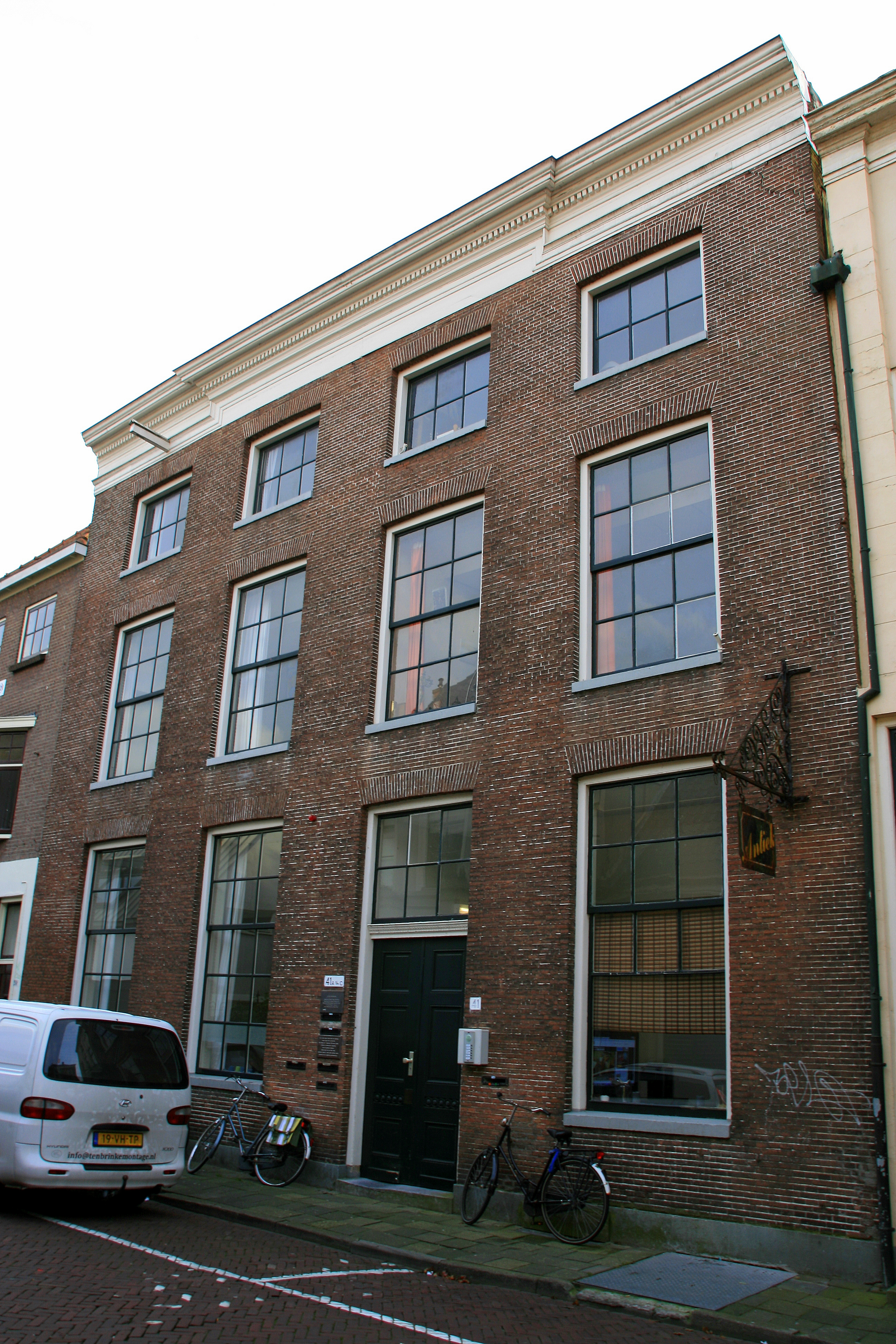
House on the Voorstraat 41, once occupied by Heyns in Zwolle

Heyns moved to Zwolle in 1606, where he opened a publishing company located behind what is now the Vrouwenhuis. It is there where he wrote an account of the 1609 international rhetoric contest in Haarlem for Trou moet Blycken. In 1615 and 1616 he wrote poetry for the Schiedam chamber of rhetoric called "De Roode Rosen", and in 1625 he published his poetry in an emblem book which became popular. He died in Zwolle.
