= Mari Andriessen =

Dutch sculptor

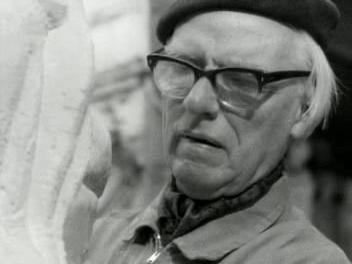
Mari Andriessen in 1967

Mari Andriessen in 1977, Dutch newsreel

Mari Silvester Andriessen (4 December 1897 – 7 December 1979) was a Dutch sculptor, best known for his work memorializing victims of the Holocaust. Born and died in Haarlem, Andriessen is buried at the RK Begraafplaats Sint Adelberts in Bloemendaal, the Netherlands.

== Sculptures ==
- Cornelis Lely
- Anne Frank, Amsterdam
- Dokwerker, Amsterdam
- Vrijheidsbeeld (means Freedom statue), Vrijheidsdreef, Groenendaal park, Heemstede
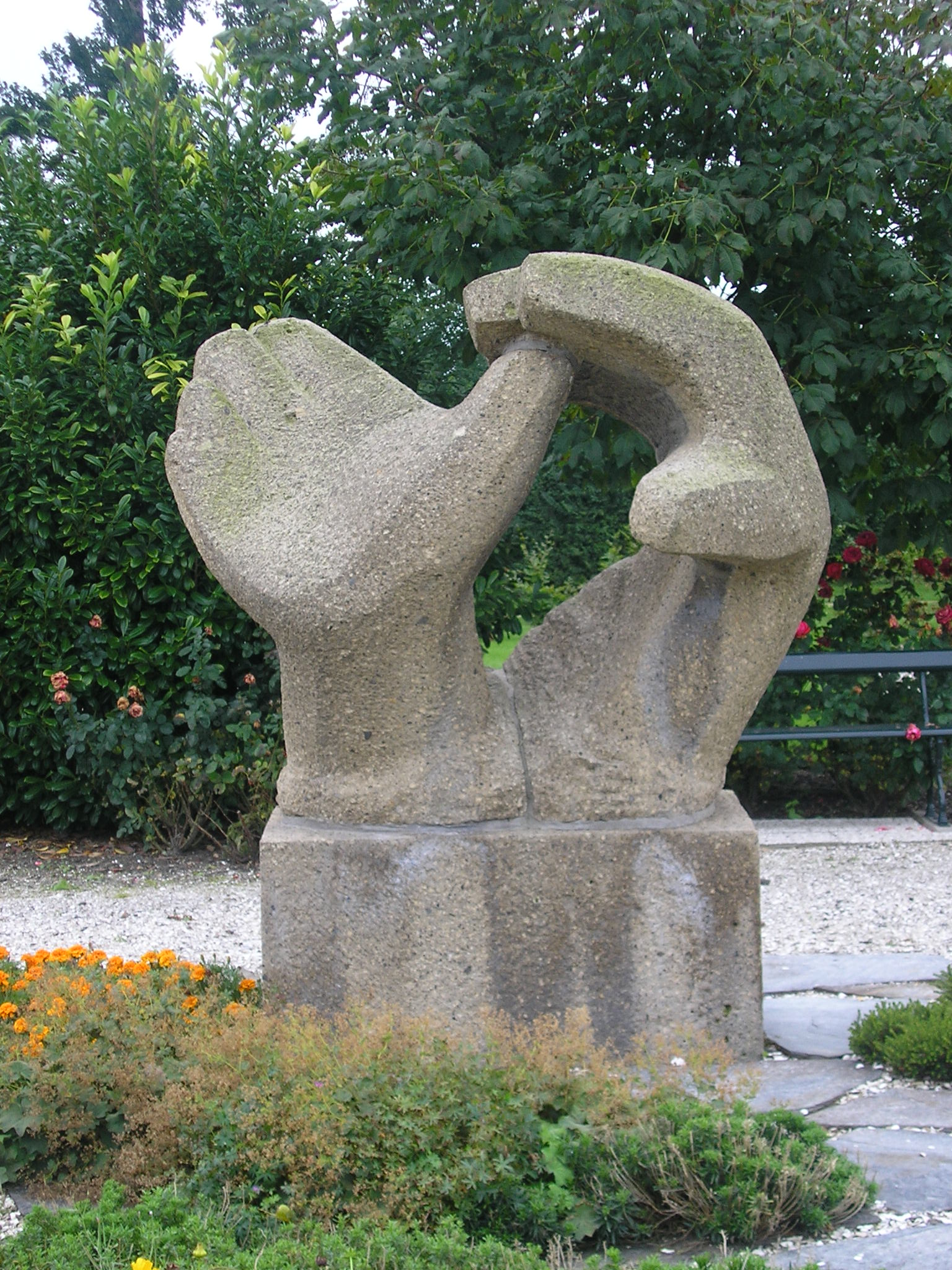
Monument North Sea flood 1953 (Ouwerkerk)

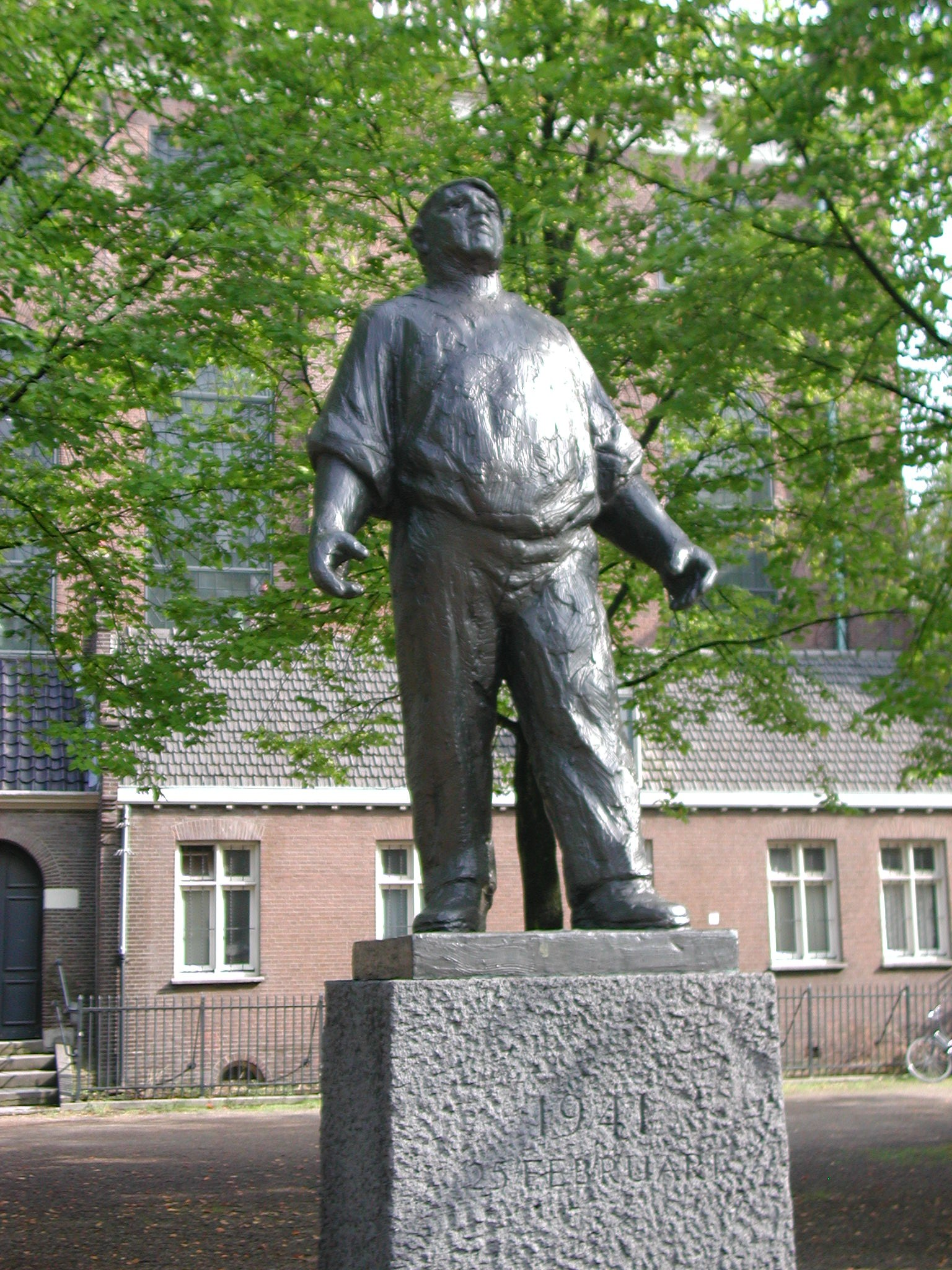
De Dokwerker (1952) in Amsterdam

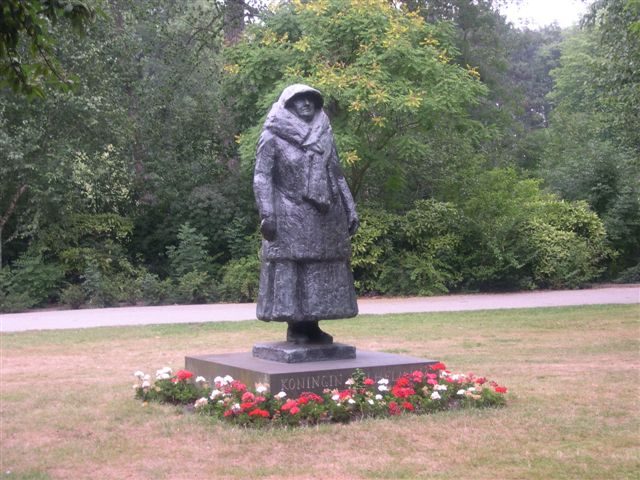
Statue of Queen Wilhelmina, 1952 (Utrecht)

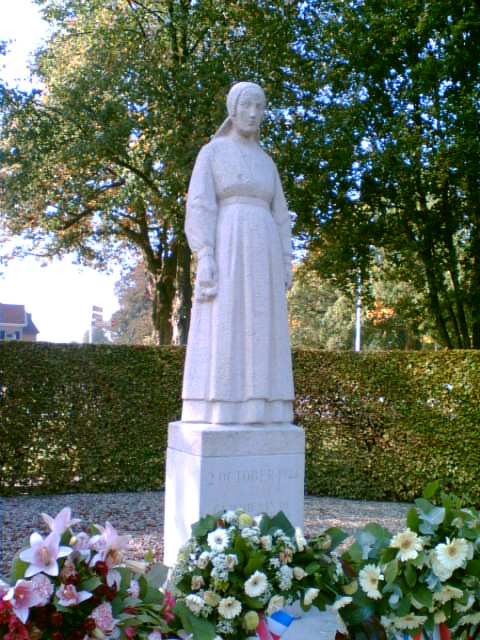
Mourning widow, war monument in Putten (1948)

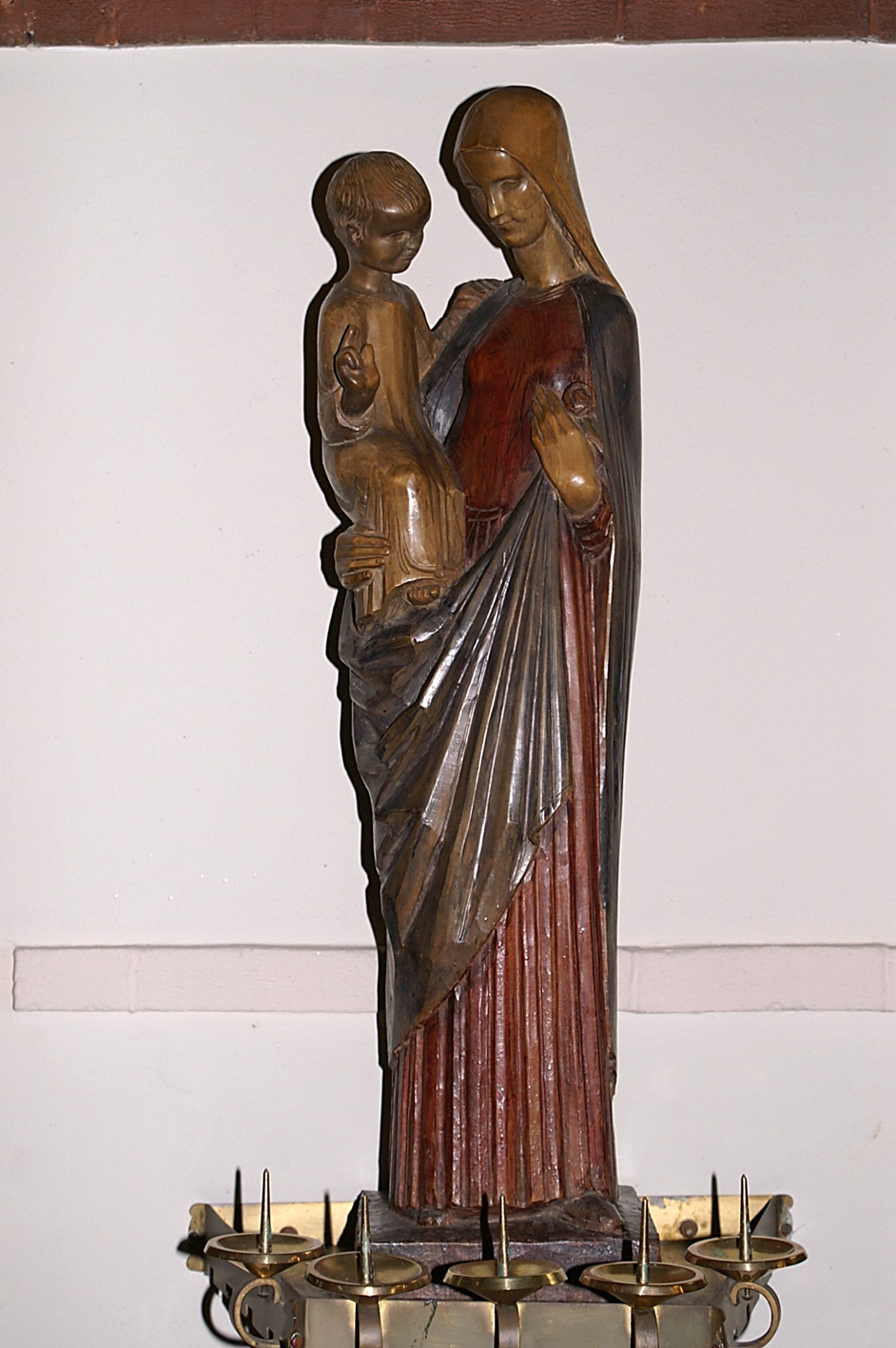
Mary & Jesus (1922) in Aerdenhout

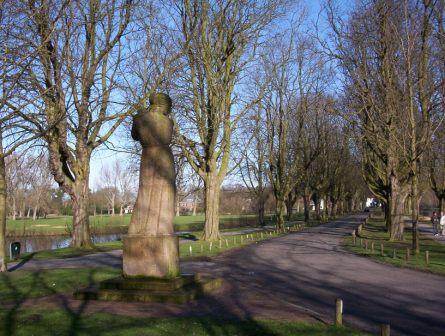
War monument (Heemstede)
