= Haarlem =

City in North Holland, Netherlands

- City and municipality
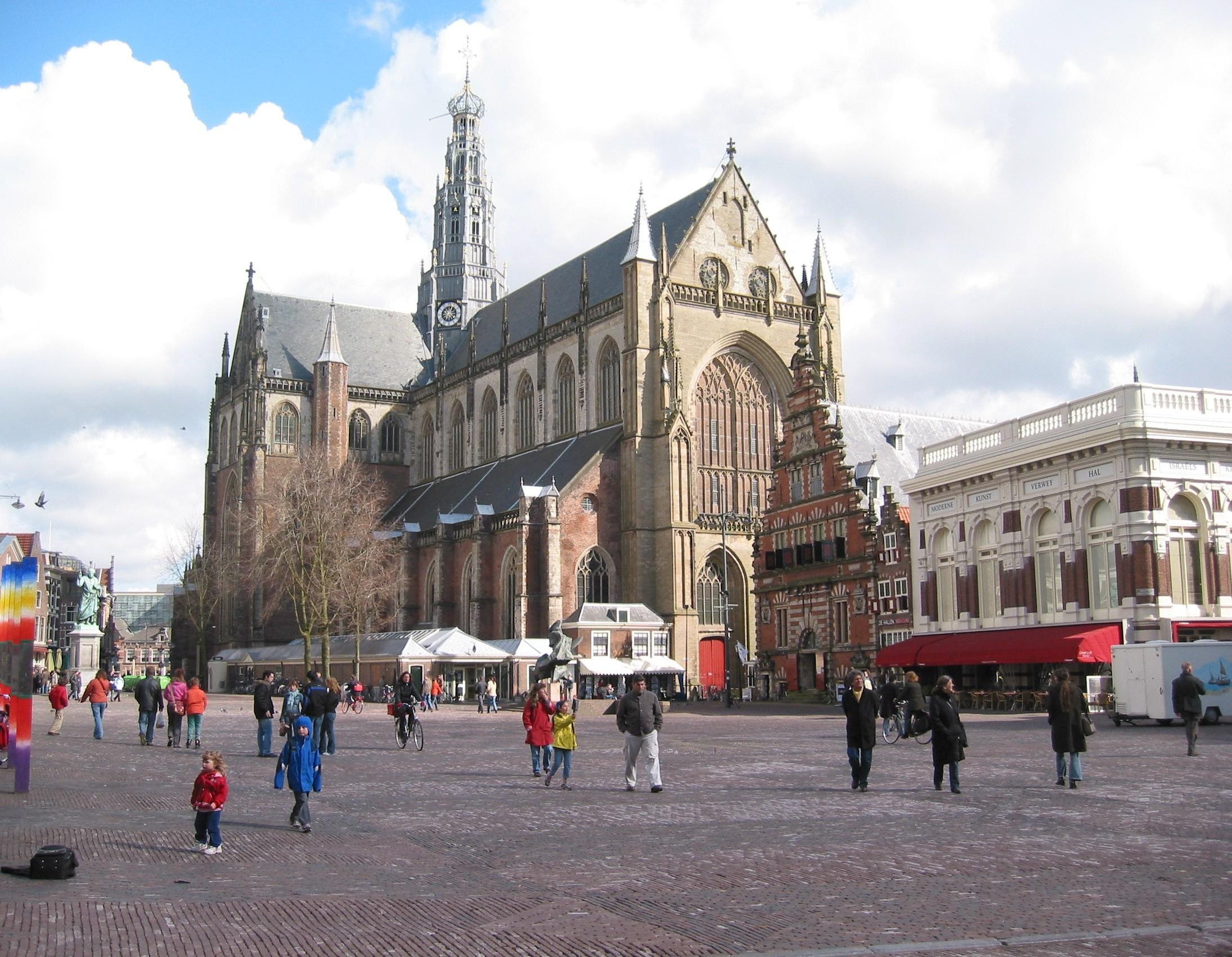
- Grote Kerk ("Great Church") or St.-Bavokerk ("Church of St. Bavo") on the Grote Markt, Haarlem's central square

- Flag Coat of arms Brandmark
- Nicknames: Bloemenstad (Flower City), Spaarnestad (Spaarne City)
- Motto: Vicit vim virtus (Virtue conquered force)
- Interactive map of Haarlem
- Location within the Netherlands Location within Europe
- Coordinates: 52°22′53″N 4°38′8″E
- Country: Netherlands
- Province: North Holland
- Region: Amsterdam metropolitan area
- City Hall: Haarlem City Hall

Government
  - Body: Municipal council
  - Mayor: Jos Wienen (CDA)

Area
  - Municipality: 32.09 km^{2} (12.39 sq mi)
  - Land: 29.17 km^{2} (11.26 sq mi)
  - Water: 2.92 km^{2} (1.13 sq mi)
- Elevation: 2 m (6.6 ft)

Population (Municipality, January 2026; Urban and Metro, May 2014)
  - Municipality: 168,898
  - Rank: 6th in Randstad 11th in Netherlands
  - Density: 5,790/km^{2} (15,000/sq mi)
  - Urban: 230,823
  - Metro: 420,447
- Demonym(s): Haarlemmer, Mug('mosquito')
- Time zone: UTC+1 (CET)
  - Summer (DST): UTC+2 (CEST)
- Postcode: 2000–2037, 2063
- Area code: 023
- Website: www.haarlem.nl

Haarlem (Dutch: [ˈɦaːrlɛm]) is a city and municipality in the Netherlands. It is the capital of the province of North Holland. Haarlem is situated at the northern edge of the Randstad, one of the most populated metropolitan areas in Europe; it is also part of the Amsterdam metropolitan area. Haarlem had a population of 168,898 in 2026.

Haarlem was granted city status or stadsrechten in 1245, although the first city walls were not built until 1270. The modern city encompasses the former municipality of Schoten as well as parts that previously belonged to Bloemendaal and Heemstede. Apart from the city, the municipality of Haarlem also includes the western part of the village of Spaarndam. Newer sections of Spaarndam lie within the neighbouring municipality of Haarlemmermeer.

== Geography ==
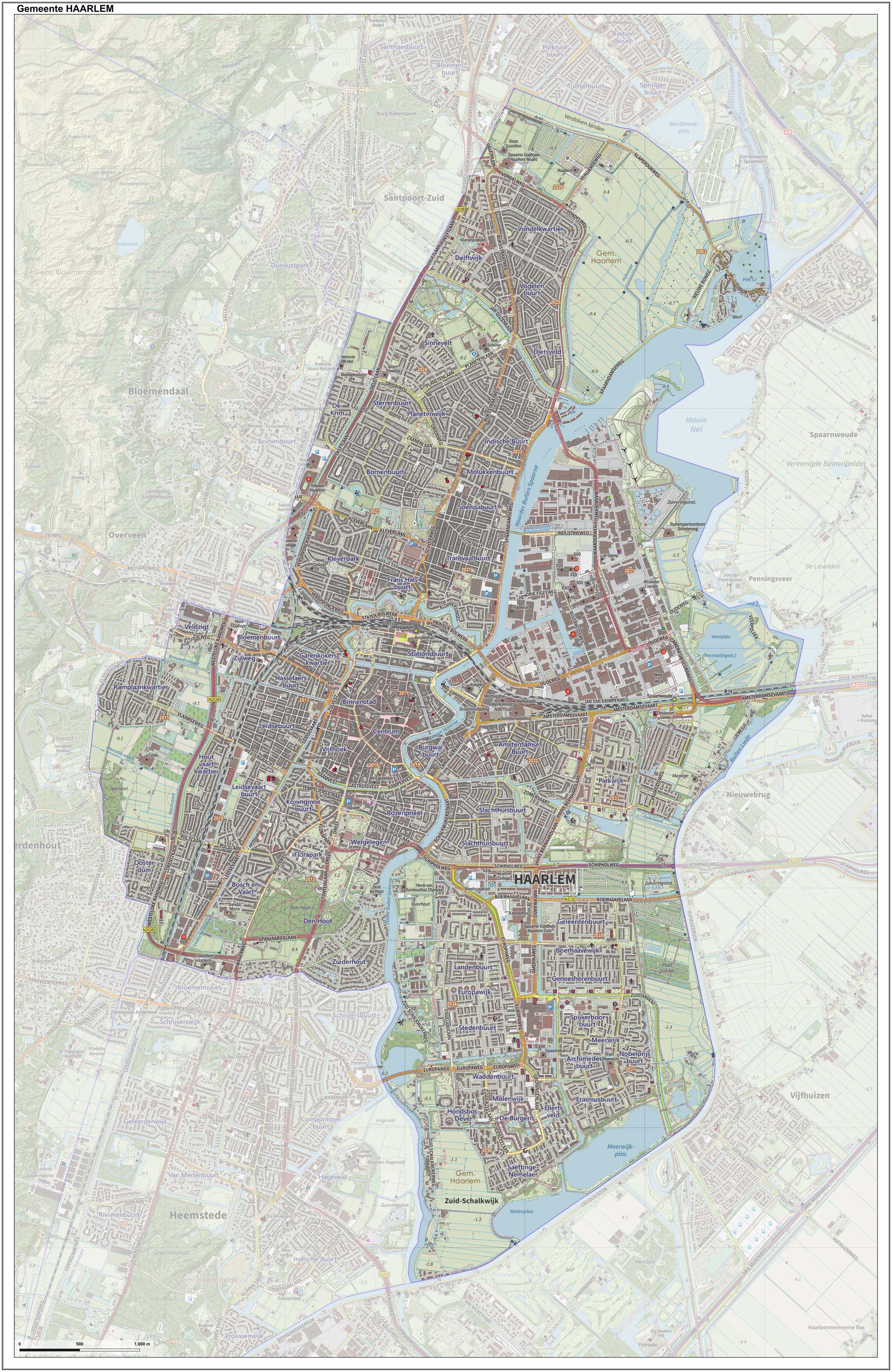
Map of Haarlem.

Haarlem is located on the river Spaarne, giving it its nickname Spaarnestad (Spaarne city). It is situated about 20 km (12 mi) west of Amsterdam and near the coastal dunes. Haarlem has been the historical centre of the tulip bulb-growing district for centuries and bears its other nickname Bloemenstad (flower city) for this reason.

== History ==
Historical population

Year	Pop.	±% p.a.
1398	7,500	—
1477	11,367	+0.53%
1494	10,917	−0.24%
1514	12,213	+0.56%
1560	16,000	+0.59%
1622	39,455	+1.47%
1632	34,900	−1.22%
1665	38,000	+0.26%
1732	45,000	+0.25%
1748	24,696	−3.68%
1770	22,000	−0.52%
1795	21,227	−0.14%
1850	25,888	+0.36%
1860	27,781	+0.71%
1870	31,442	+1.25%

Year	Pop.	±% p.a.
1880	38,153	+1.95%
1890	51,558	+3.06%
1900	64,819	+2.32%
1910	69,594	+0.71%
1920	77,327	+1.06%
1930	119,700	+4.47%
1940	142,686	+1.77%
1950	164,007	+1.40%
1960	169,496	+0.33%
1970	172,612	+0.18%
1980	157,556	−0.91%
1990	149,474	−0.53%
2000	148,375	−0.07%
2010	150,695	+0.16%
2020	162,902	+0.78%

Source: Lourens & Lucassen 1997, pp. 61–62 (1398–1795)
Statistics Netherlands (1850–Present)

Haarlem has a rich history dating back to pre-medieval times, as it lies on a thin strip of land above sea level known as the strandwal (beach ridge), which connects Leiden to Alkmaar. The people on this narrow strip of land struggled against the waters of the North Sea from the west, and the waters of the IJ and the Haarlem Lake from the east. Haarlem became wealthy with toll revenues that it collected from ships and travellers moving on this busy north–south route.

As shipping became increasingly important economically, the city of Amsterdam became the main Dutch city of North Holland during the Dutch Golden Age. The town of Halfweg became a suburb, and Haarlem became a quiet bedroom community, and for this reason Haarlem still has many of its central medieval buildings intact. Many of them are now on the Dutch Heritage register known as Rijksmonuments. The list of Rijksmonuments in Haarlem gives an overview of these per neighbourhood, with the majority in the old city centre.

=== Middle Ages ===
The oldest mention of Haarlem dates from the 10th century. The name probably comes from "Haarlo-heim". This name is composed of three elements: haar, lo and heim. In Old Dutch toponyms lo always refers to 'forest' and heim (heem, em or um) to 'home' or 'house'. Haar, however, has several meanings, one of them corresponding with the location of Haarlem on a sand dune: 'elevated place'. The name Haarlem or Haarloheim would therefore mean 'home on a forested dune'.

There was a stream called "De Beek", dug from the peat grounds west of the river Spaarne as a drainage canal. Over the centuries the Beek was turned into an underground canal, as the city grew larger and the space was needed for construction. Over time it began to silt up and in the 19th century it was filled in. The village had a good location: by the river Spaarne, and by a major road going south to north. By the 12th century it was a fortified town, and Haarlem became the residence of the Counts of Holland.

In 1219 the knights of Haarlem were laurelled by Count Willem I, because they had conquered the Egyptian port of Damietta (or Damiate in Dutch, present-day Dimyat) in the Fifth Crusade. Haarlem received the right to bear the Count's sword and cross in its coat of arms. On 23 November 1245 Count Willem II granted Haarlem city rights. This implied a number of privileges, among which the right for the sheriff and magistrates to administer justice, instead of the Count. This allowed for a quicker and more efficient judiciary system, more suited to the needs of the growing city.

After a siege from the surrounding area of Kennemerland in 1270 a defensive wall was built around the city. Most likely this was an earthen wall with wooden gates. Originally the city started out between Spaarne, Oudegracht, Ridderstraat, Bakenessergracht and Nassaustraat. In the 14th century the city expanded, and the Burgwalbuurt, Bakenes and the area around the Oudegracht became part of the city. The old defenses proved not to be sufficiently strong for the expanded city, and at the end of the 14th century a 16½-metre high wall was built, complete with a 15-metre wide canal circling the city. In 1304 the Flemish threatened the city, but they were defeated by Witte van Haemstede at Manpad.

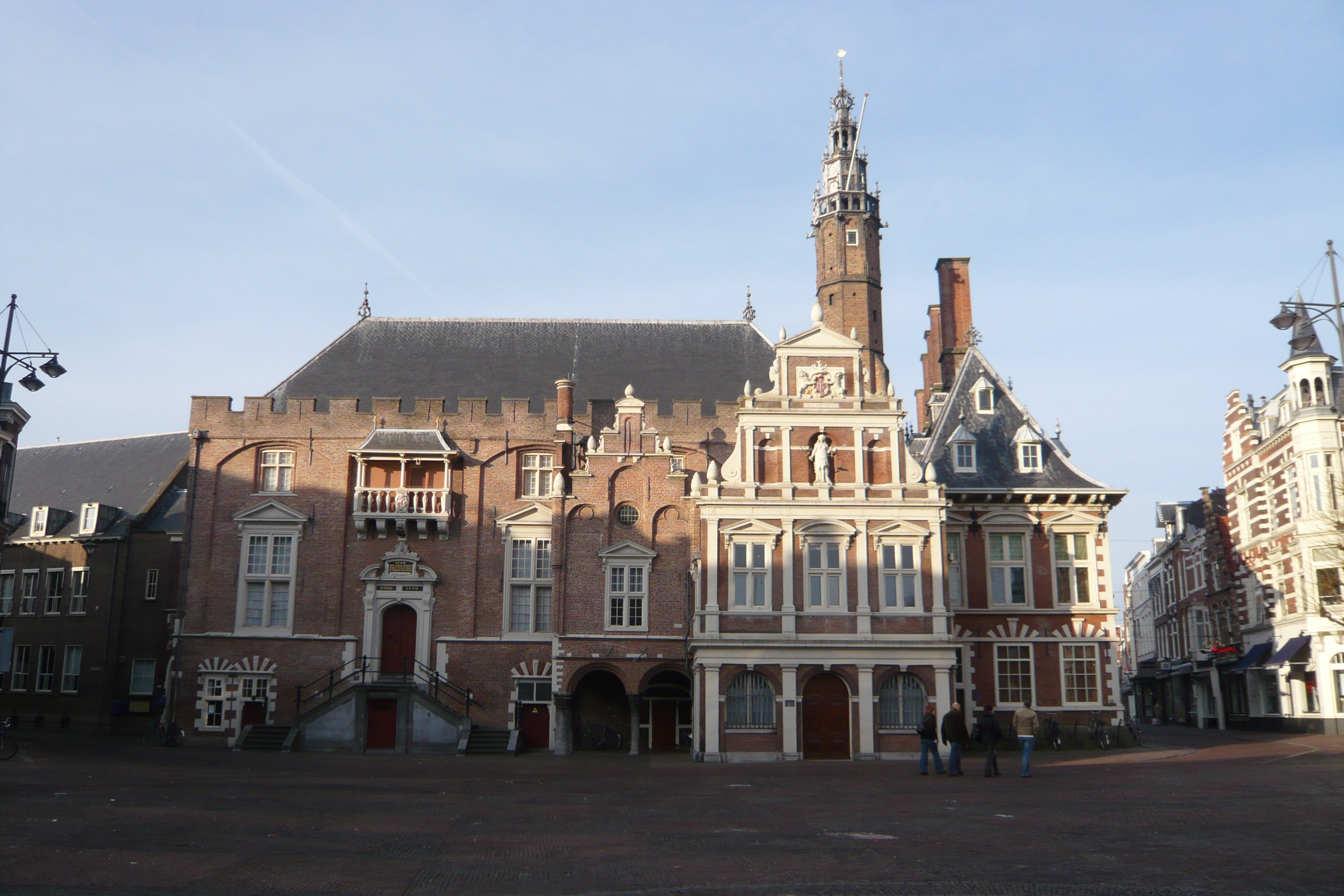
The City Hall on the Grote Markt, built in the 14th century, replacing the Count's castle after it partially burnt down. The remains were given to the city.

All the city's buildings were made of wood, and fire was a great risk. In 1328 nearly the whole city burnt down. The Sint-Bavokerk was severely damaged, and rebuilding it would take more than 150 years. Again on 12 June 1347 there was a fire in the city. A third large fire, in 1351, destroyed many buildings including the Count's castle and the city hall. The Count did not need a castle in Haarlem because his castle in The Hague (Den Haag) had taken over all functions.

The count donated the ground to the city and later a new city hall was built there. The shape of the old city was square—this was inspired by the shape of ancient Jerusalem. After every fire the city was rebuilt quickly, an indication of the wealth of the city in those years. The Black Death came to the city in 1381. According to an estimate by a priest from Leiden the disease killed 5,000 people, about half the population at that time.

In the 14th century, Haarlem was a major city. It was the second largest city in historical Holland after Dordrecht and before Delft, Leiden, Amsterdam, Gouda and Rotterdam. In 1429 the city gained the right to collect tolls, including ships passing the city on the Spaarne river. At the end of the Middle Ages, Haarlem was a flourishing city with a large textile industry, shipyards and beer breweries. Around 1428, the city was put under siege by the army of Jacqueline, Countess of Hainaut. Haarlem had taken side with the Cods in the Hook and Cod wars and thus against Jacoba of Bavaria. The entire Haarlemmerhout wood was burnt down by the enemy.

=== Spanish siege ===
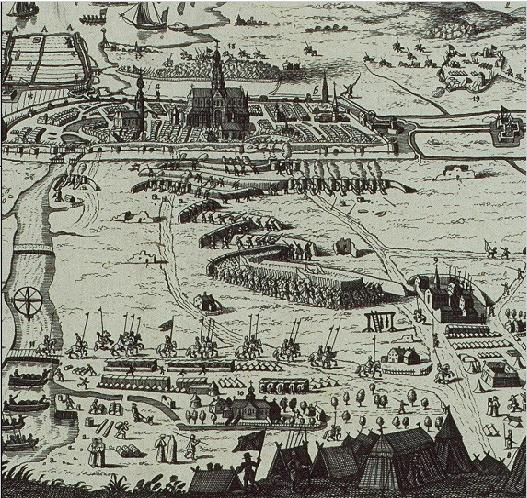
A sketch of the siege of Haarlem seen from the North, with Het Dolhuys on the right, and the river Spaarne on the left

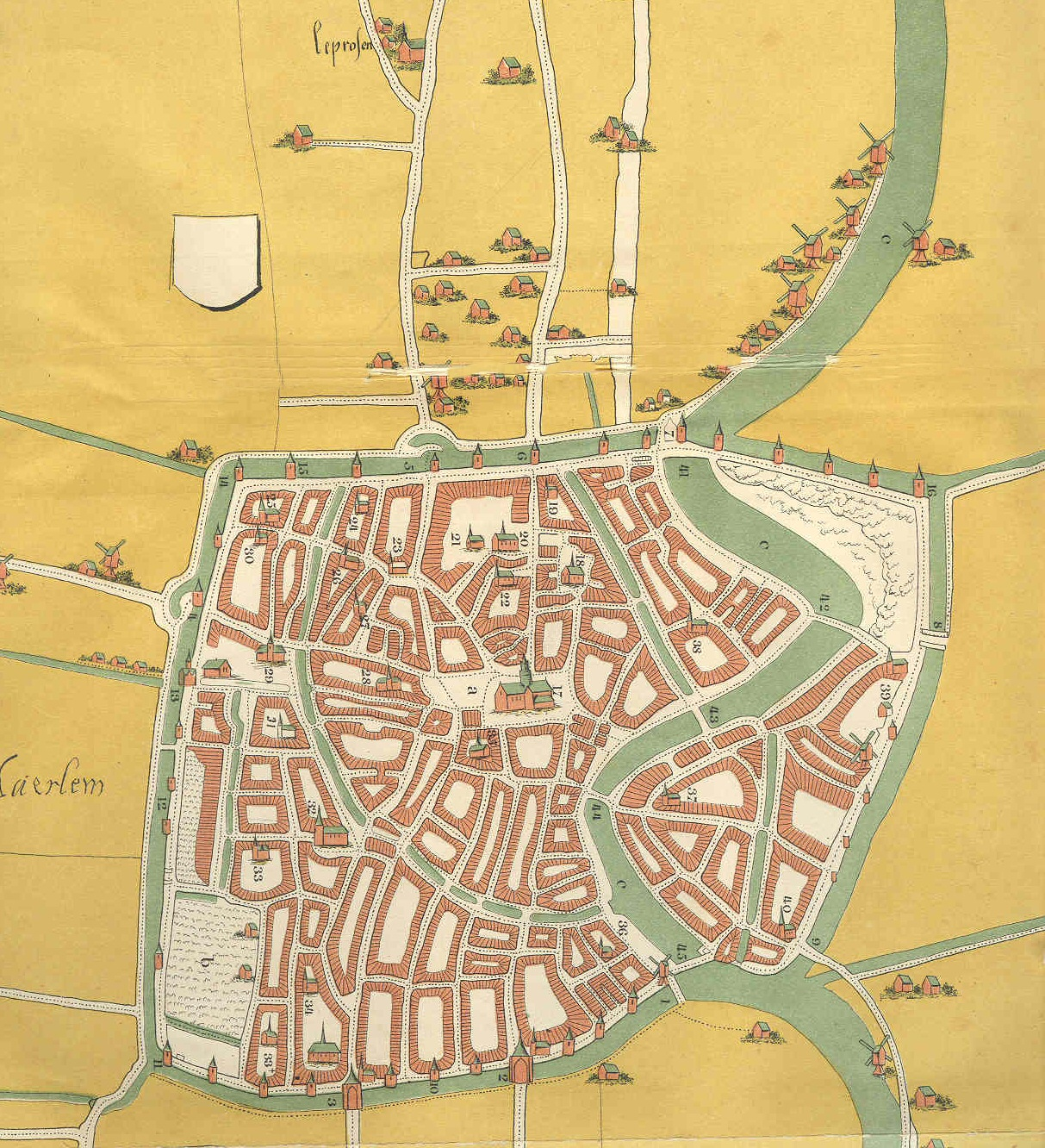
A map of Haarlem around 1550. The city is completely surrounded by a wall and defensive moat. In the North (top), at a fork in the road, the complex known as Het Dolhuys can be seen. In the south-west corner on the lower left, are the city bleaching grounds. The near-square shape of the city was based on the ancient plan of Jerusalem.

When the city of Brielle was conquered by the Geuzen revolutionary army, the municipality of Haarlem started supporting the Geuzen. King Philip II of Spain was not pleased, and sent an army north under the command of Don Fadrique (Don Frederick in Dutch), son of Fernando Álvarez de Toledo, 3rd Duke of Alba. On 17 November 1572 all citizens of the city of Zutphen were killed by the Spanish army, and on 1 December the city of Naarden suffered the same fate.

On 11 December 1572 the Spanish army besieged Haarlem; the city's defenses were commanded by city-governor Wigbolt Ripperda. Kenau Simonsdochter Hasselaer, a powerful widow, helped defend the city together with some three hundred other women.

During the first two months of the siege, the situation was in balance. The Spanish army was digging tunnels to reach the city walls and blow them up; the defenders dug in turn and undermined the Spaniards' tunnels. The situation worsened on 29 March 1573: the Amsterdam army, faithful to the Spanish king, controlled Haarlemmermeer lake, effectively blocking Haarlem from the outside world. An attempt by the Prince of Orange to destroy the Spanish navy on the Haarlemmermeer had failed. Hunger in the city grew, and the situation became so tense that on 27 May many (Spanish-loyal) prisoners were taken from the prison and murdered; the Spaniards had previously gibbeted their own prisoners of war.

In the beginning of July the Prince of Orange assembled an army of 5,000 soldiers near Leiden to free Haarlem. However, he was prevented from accompanying them in person and the Spanish forces trapped them at the Manpad where they were decisively defeated. On 13 July 1573, after seven months of siege, the city surrendered. Many defenders were slaughtered; some were drowned in the Spaarne river. Governor Ripperda and his lieutenant were beheaded. The citizens were allowed to buy freedom for themselves and the city for 240,000 guilders and the city was required to host a Spanish garrison. Don Fadrique thanked God for his victory in the Sint-Bavo Church. However, the terms of the treaty were not kept, with the Spanish soldiery plundering the townspeople's property.

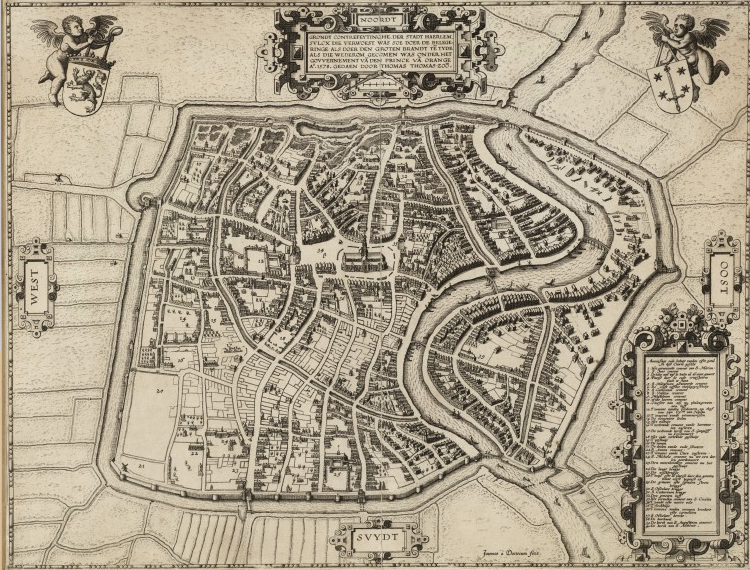
A map of Haarlem after the fire in 1578 by Thomas Thomasz. The damage across the city can still be seen two years later.

Despite Haarlem's ultimate fall, the fact that the Haarlemers had been able to stand for seven months against the whole Spanish array inspired the rest of Holland to resist the invaders, and their prolonged resistance allowed the Prince of Orange to prepare and arm the rest of the country for war. Some 12,000 of the Spanish army had fallen during the siege.

=== Great fire ===
The city suffered a large fire in the night from 22 to 23 October 1576. The fire started in brewery het Ankertje, near the weighhouse at the Spaarne, which was used by mercenaries as a guarding place. When they were warming themselves at a fire it got out of control. The fire was spotted by farmers, who sailed their ships on the river. However, the soldiers turned down all help, saying that they would put out the fire themselves.

This failed, and the fire destroyed almost 500 buildings, among them St-Gangolf's church and St-Elisabeth's hospital. Most of the mercenaries were later arrested, and one of them was hanged on the Grote Markt in front of a large audience. Maps from that era clearly show the damage done by the fire: a wide strip through the city was destroyed. The combined result of the siege and the fire was that about a third of the city was destroyed.

=== Golden age ===
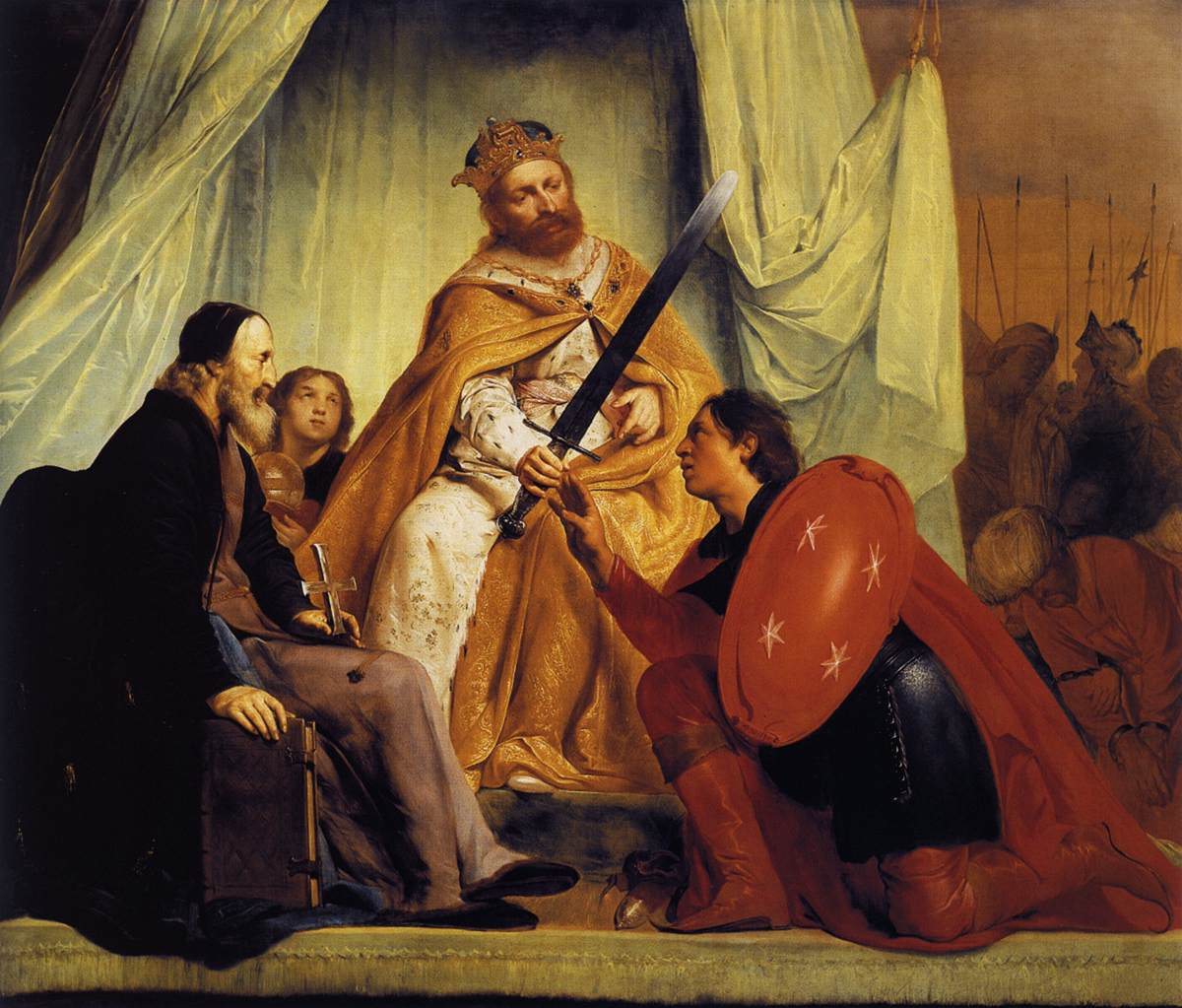
The legend of the Haarlem shield, painting (c. 1630) by Pieter de Grebber in the City Hall

The fire and the long siege had taken their toll on the city. The Spanish left in 1577 and under the Agreement of Veere, Protestants and Catholics were given equal rights, though in government the Protestants clearly had the upper hand and Catholic possessions once seized were never returned. To restore the economy and attract workers for the brewing and bleaching businesses (Haarlem was known for these, thanks to the clean water from the dunes), the Haarlem council decided to promote the pursuit of arts and history, showing tolerance for diversity among religious beliefs.

This attracted a large influx of Flemish and French immigrants (Catholics and Huguenots alike) who were fleeing the Spanish occupation of their own cities. Expansion plans soon replaced plans of rebuilding the destroyed city walls. Just like the rest of the country, the Golden Age in the United Provinces had started.

==== Linen and silk ====
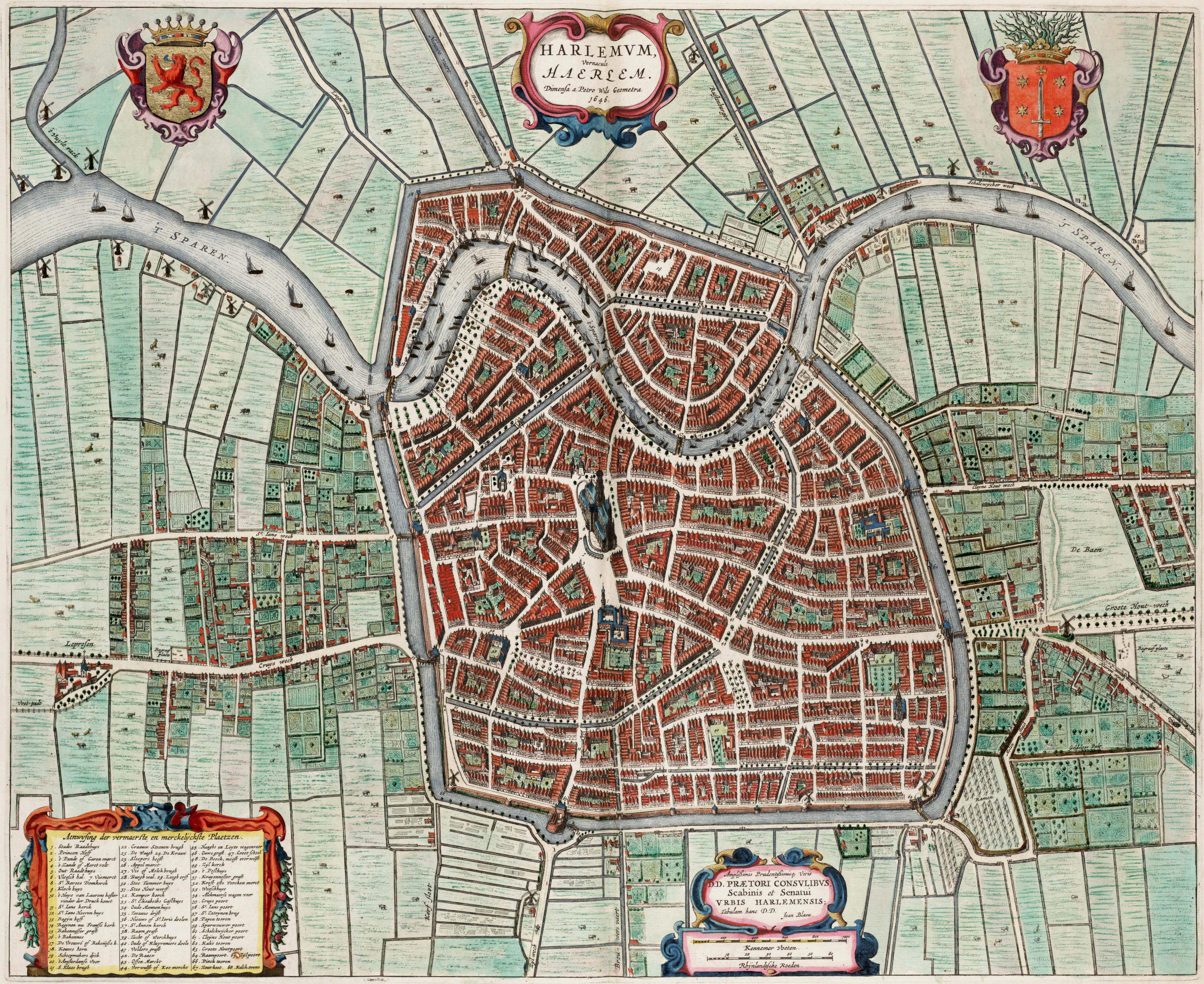
A map of Haarlem in 1646, before Salomon de Bray's ambitious northwards expansion plan was executed. North is to the left. The Houtmarkt has been built in the north east, and the Haarlemmerport is visible, as well as the Old Men's Almshouse, which now houses the Frans Hals Museum.

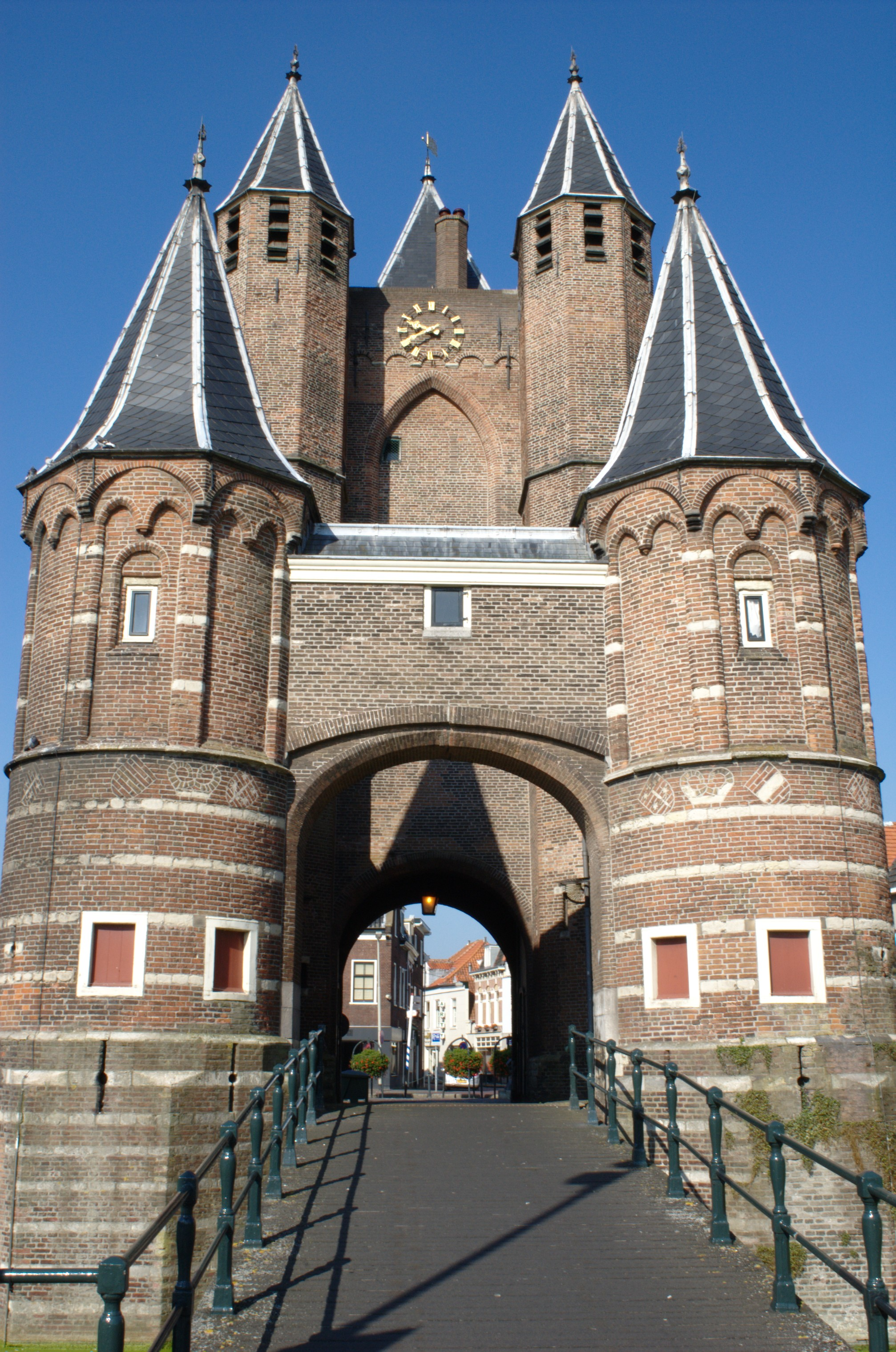
The Amsterdamse Poort, former gateway to the city from Amsterdam, is one of the few visible traces left of the old city wall.

The new citizens had a lot of expertise in linen and silk manufacture and trading, and the city's population grew from 18,000 in 1573 to around 40,000 in 1622. At one point, in 1621, over 50% of the population was Flemish-born. Haarlem's linen became notable and the city flourished. Today an impression of some of those original textile tradesmen can be had from the Book of Trades document created by Jan Luyken and his son.

==== Infrastructure ====
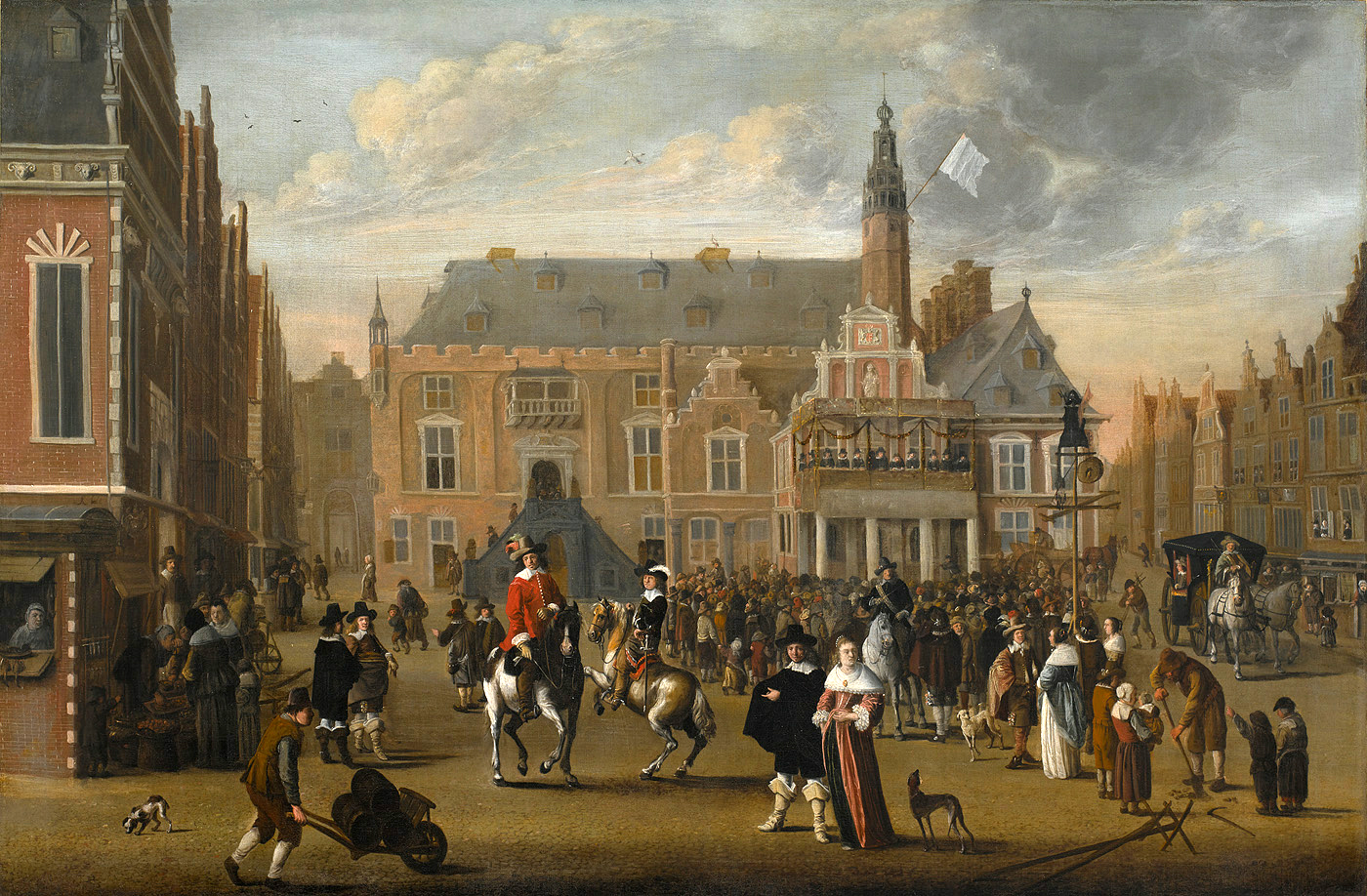
Grote Markt of Haarlem, c. 1670–90, by Cornelis Beelt

In 1632 a tow canal between Haarlem and Amsterdam, the Haarlemmertrekvaart was opened, the first tow canal in the country. The empty areas in the city that were a result of the fire of 1576 were filled with new houses and buildings. Even outside the city wall buildings were constructed—in 1643 about 400 houses were counted outside the wall.

Having buildings outside the city walls was not a desirable situation to the city administration. Not only because these buildings would be vulnerable in case of an attack on the city, but there was also less control over taxes and city regulations outside the walls. Therefore, a major project was initiated in 1671: expanding the city northwards.

Two new canals were dug, and a new defensive wall was constructed (the current Staten en Prinsenbolwerk). Two old city gates, the Janspoort and Kruispoort, were demolished. The idea that a city had to be square-shaped was abandoned.

==== Cultural life ====
After the fall of Antwerp, many artists and craftsmen migrated to Haarlem and received commissions from the Haarlem council to decorate the city hall. The paintings commissioned were meant to show Haarlem's glorious history as well as Haarlem's glorious products. Haarlem's cultural life prospered, with painters like Frans Hals and Jacob van Ruisdael, the architect Lieven de Key and Jan Steen who made many paintings in Haarlem.

The Haarlem councilmen became quite creative in their propaganda promoting their city. On the Grote Markt, the central market square, there's a statue of Laurens Janszoon Coster who is allegedly the inventor of the printing press. This is the second and larger statue to him on the square. The original stands behind the city hall in the little garden known as the Hortus (where today the Stedelijk Gymnasium school is located).

Most scholars agree that the scarce evidence seems to point to Johann Gutenberg as the first European inventor of the printing press, but Haarlem children were taught about "Lau", as he is known, well into the 20th century. This legend served the printers of Haarlem well, however, and it is probably for that reason the most notable Dutch history books from the Dutch Golden Age period were published in Haarlem; by Hadrianus Junius (Batavia), Dirck Volkertszoon Coornhert (Works), Karel van Mander (Schilderboeck), Samuel Ampzing (Description and Ode to Haarlem), Petrus Scriverius (Batavia Illustrata), and Pieter Christiaenszoon Bor (Origin of the Dutch wars).

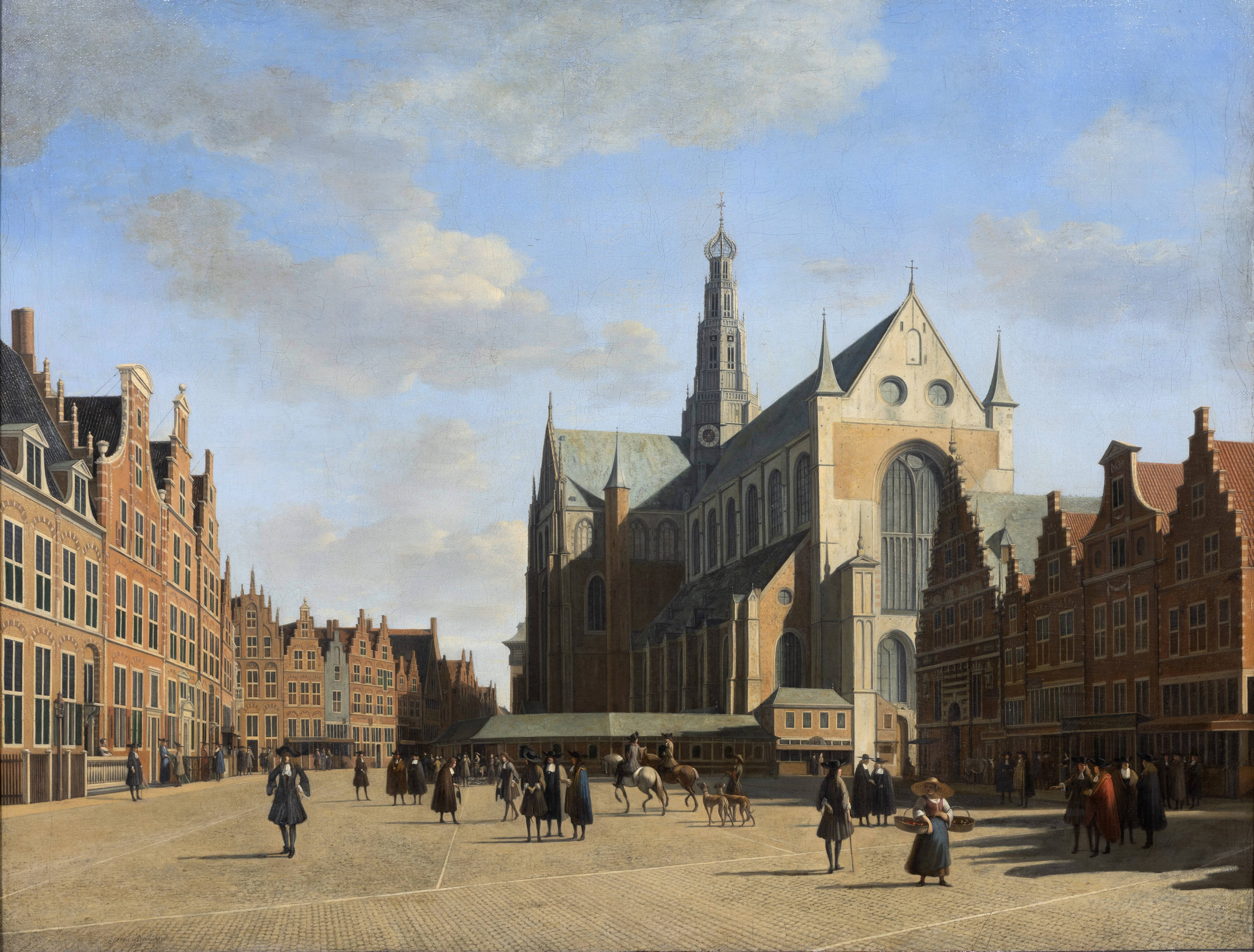
The Grote Markt in 1696, painting by Gerrit Adriaensz. Berckheyde

==== Beer brewing ====
Beer brewing was a very important industry in Haarlem. Until the 16th century, the water for the beer was taken from the canals in the city. These canals were connected to seawater, via the Spaarne and the IJ. However, the canal water was getting more and more polluted and less suitable for brewing beer. A place 1.5 km (0.9 mi) south-west of the city was then used to take fresh water in.

However, the quality of that water was not good enough either. From the 17th century, a canal (Santvaert) was used to transport water from the dunes to the city. The water was transported in barrels on ships. The location where the water was taken is called the Brouwerskolkje, and the canal to there still exists, and is now called the Brewers' Canal (Brouwersvaart).

Haarlem was a major beer producer in the Netherlands. The majority of the beer it produced was consumed in North Holland. During the Spanish siege, there were about 50 breweries in the city. In 1620, the city had about one hundred breweries.

There was another epidemic of the Black Death in 1657, which took a heavy toll in the six months it ravaged the city. From the end of the 17th century, the economy in the city worsened for a long time. In 1752, only seven breweries remained, and by 1820 no breweries were registered in the city. In the 1990s, the Stichting Haarlems Biergenootschap revived some old recipes under the Jopen beer brand that is marketed as a "Haarlem bier." In 2010, Jopen opened a brewery in a former church in central Haarlem called the Jopenkerk. In 2012, Haarlem gained another local brewery with Uiltje Brewing in the Zijlstraat, which specializes in craft beer.

==== Tulip centre ====
Since the 1630s, Haarlem has been a major trading centre for tulips, and it was at the epicentre during tulip mania, when outrageous prices were paid for tulip bulbs. From the opening of the Leiden-Haarlem canal Leidsevaart in 1656, it became popular to travel from Rotterdam to Amsterdam by passenger boat rather than by coach. The canals were dug for passenger service only, and were comfortable though slow. The towpath led these passengers through the bulb fields south of Haarlem.

Haarlem was an important stopover for passengers from the last half of the 17th century and through the 18th century until the building of the first rail tracks along the routes of former passenger canal systems. As Haarlem slowly expanded southwards, so did the bulb fields. Today, rail passengers between Rotterdam and Amsterdam in spring can see blooming bulb fields on the route between Leiden and Haarlem.

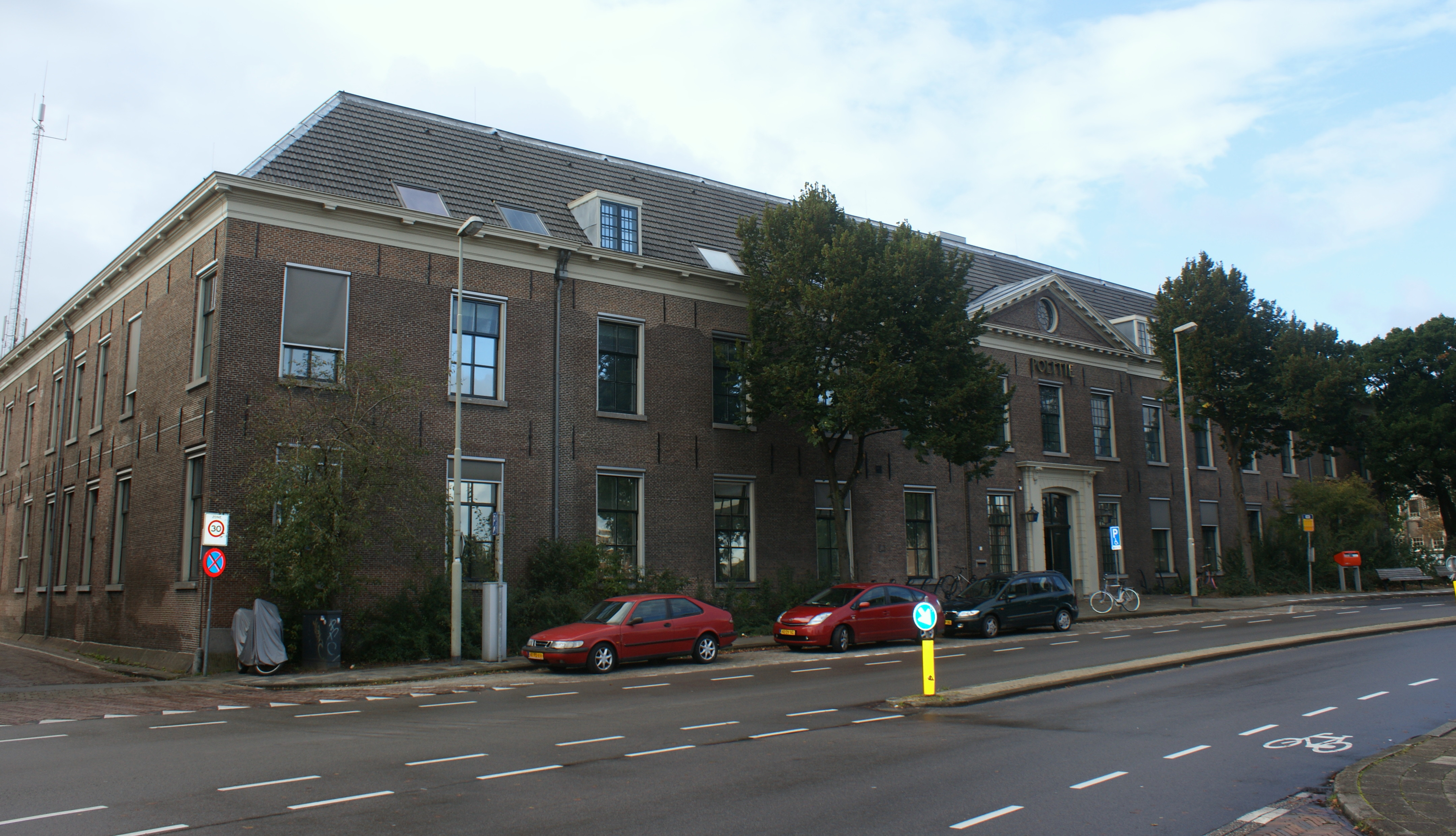
Many government-owned buildings are national heritage sites, such as the local police headquarters located on the Koudenhorn 2. Originally built as the Dutch Reformed "Diaconie" (poor house and orphanage) in 1768, it was built to house up to 900 people, indicating the extent of the economic crisis in Haarlem that had resulted from losing shipping power to Amsterdam.

=== 18th century ===
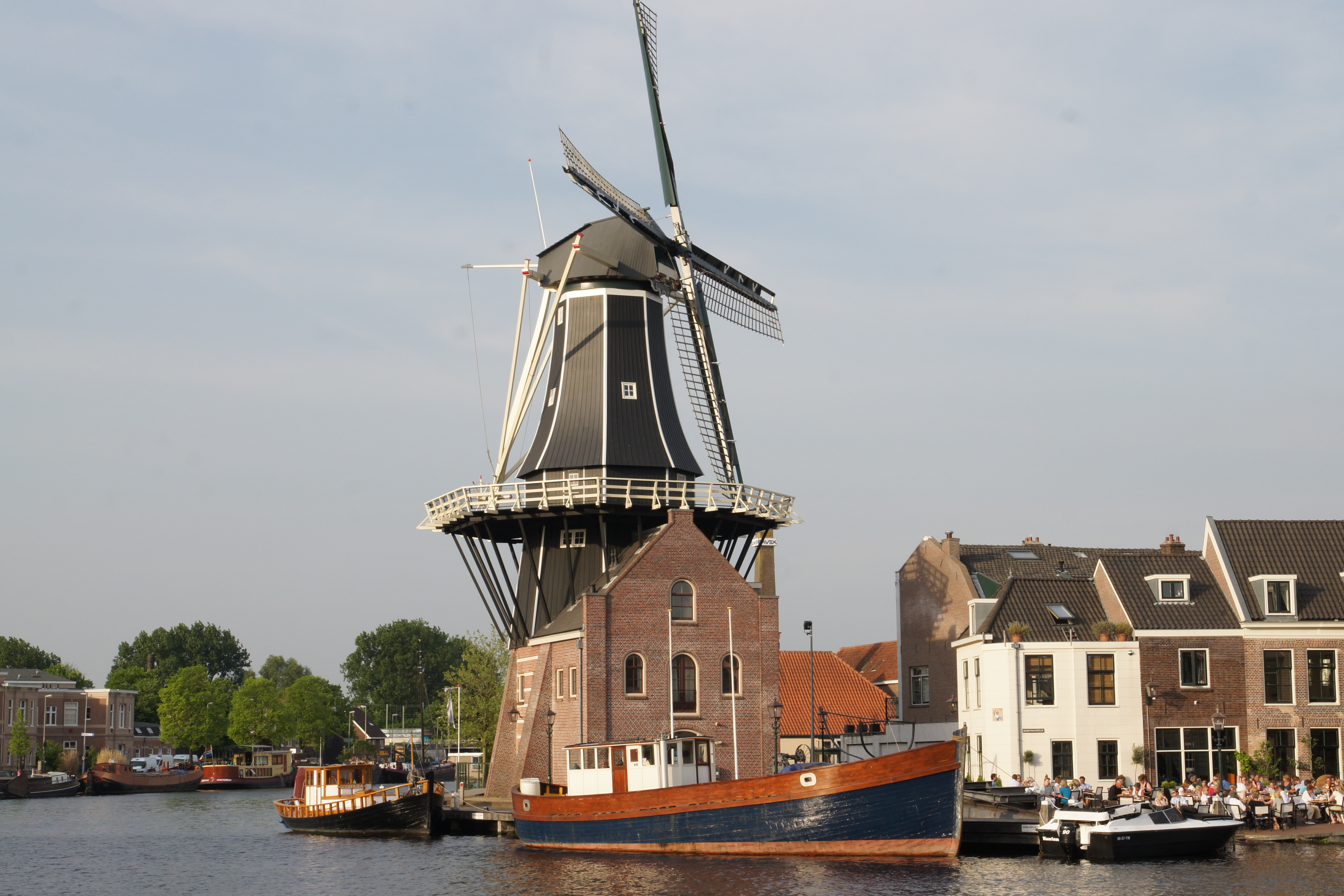
Windmill De Adriaan

As the centre of trade gravitated towards Amsterdam, Haarlem declined in the 18th century. The Golden Age had created a large upper middle class of merchants and well-to-do small business owners. Taking advantage of the reliability of the trekschuit connection between Amsterdam and Haarlem, many people had a business address in Amsterdam and a weekend or summer home in Haarlem.

Haarlem became more and more a bedroom community as the increasingly dense population of Amsterdam caused the canals to smell in the summer. Many well-to-do gentlemen moved their families to summer homes in the Spring and commuted between addresses. Popular places for summer homes were along the Spaarne in southern Haarlem. Pieter Teyler van der Hulst and Henry Hope built summer homes there, as well as many Amsterdam merchants and councilmen. Today, boat travel along the Spaarne is still possible and has become a popular form of tourism in the summer. In the 18th century, Haarlem became the seat of a suffragan diocese of the Old Catholic Church of Utrecht.

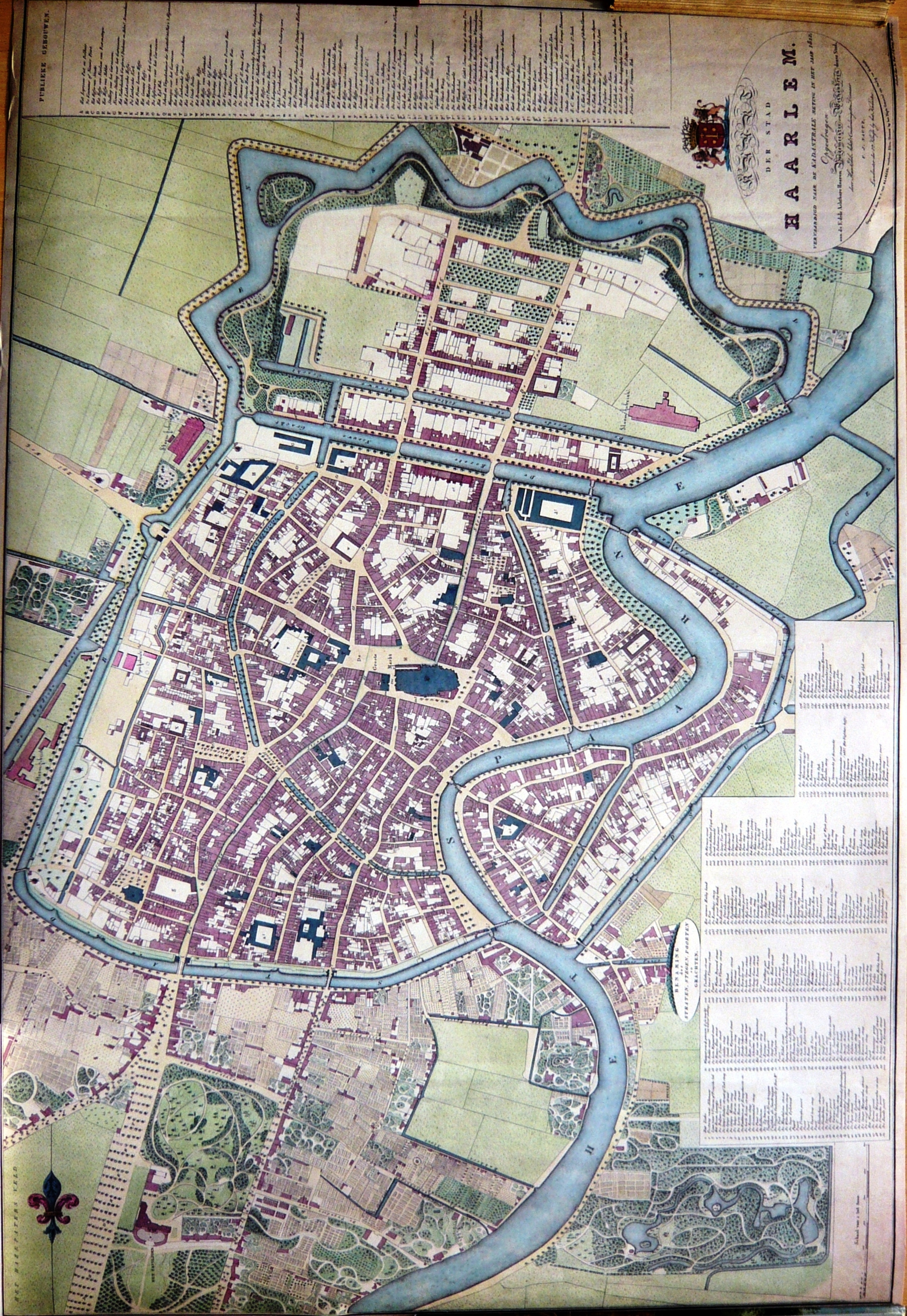
A map of Haarlem in 1827. The city walls have been torn down and used as building materials for city expansion.

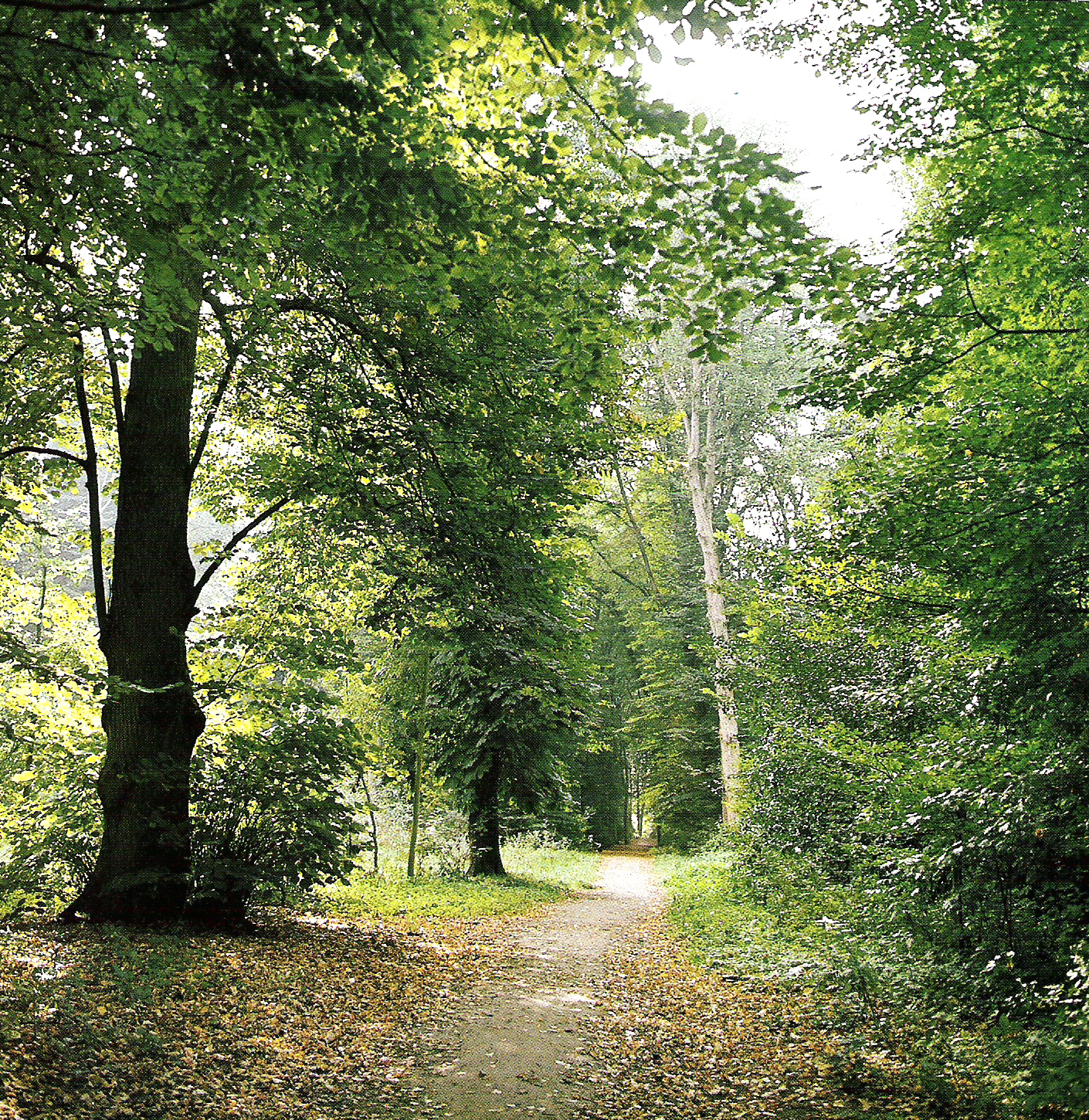
The Haarlemmerhout in Haarlem is the oldest park designed for public access in the Netherlands. It is said that Napoleon's army carved their initials in these trees.

The Villa Welgelegen, built in the 18th century, is the current government house of the province of North Holland.

=== French rule ===
At the end of the 18th century, a number of anti-Orange commissions were founded. On 18 January 1795 the "Staatse" army was defeated near Woerden. During the night preceding 19 January, the same night that stadtholder William V of Orange fled the country, the various commissions gathered and implemented a revolution. The commissions changed the city's administrators in a bloodless revolution, and the next morning the city was "liberated" of the tyranny of the House of Orange. The revolution was peaceful, and the Orange-loyal people were not harmed. The Batavian Republic was then proclaimed.

The French army entered the liberated city two days later, on 20 January. An army of 1,500 soldiers was provided with food and clothing by the citizens. The new national government was strongly centralised, and the role and influence of the cities was reduced. The Batavian Republic signed a mutual defense pact with France and was thus automatically at war with England. The strong English presence at sea severely reduced trading opportunities, and the Dutch economy suffered accordingly.

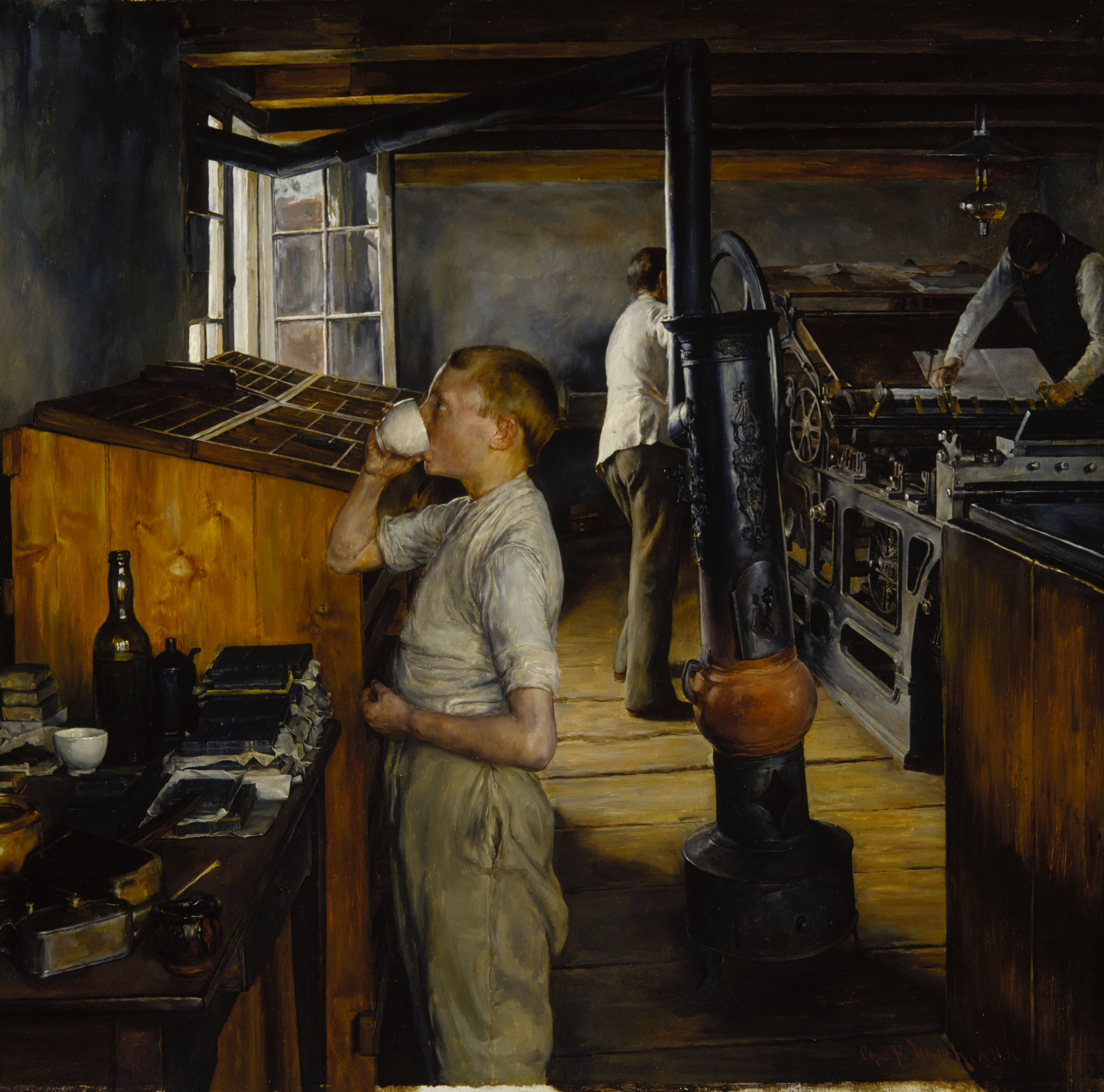
A typesetter at the Joh. Enschedé printing shop (formerly located behind the St. Bavochurch) in 1884, by the American artist Charles Frederic Ulrich

=== 19th century ===
The textile industry, which had always been an important pillar of Haarlem's economy, was suffering at the beginning of the 19th century. Strong international competition and revolutionary new production methods based on steam engines already in use in England dealt a striking blow to Haarlem's industry. In 1815, the city's population was about 17,000 people, many of whom were poor. The foundation of the United Kingdom of the Netherlands in that year gave hope to many who believed that under a new government, the economy would improve and that export-oriented economic activities, such as the textile industry, would recover.

In the beginning of the 19th century, the defense walls had lost their function, and architect Zocher Jr. planned a park on the location of the former defense line. The city walls and gates were demolished, and the bricks were reused for construction of factories and workers' homes. Haarlem became the provincial capital of North Holland province in the early 19th century.

In the mid-19th century, the city's economy slowly started to improve. New factories opened, and a number of large industrial companies were founded in Haarlem by Thomas Wilson, Guillaume Jean Poelman, J.B.T. Prévinaire, J.J. Beijnes, Hendrik Figee, Gerardus Johannes Droste, and G.P.J. Beccari.

==== Cotton mills ====
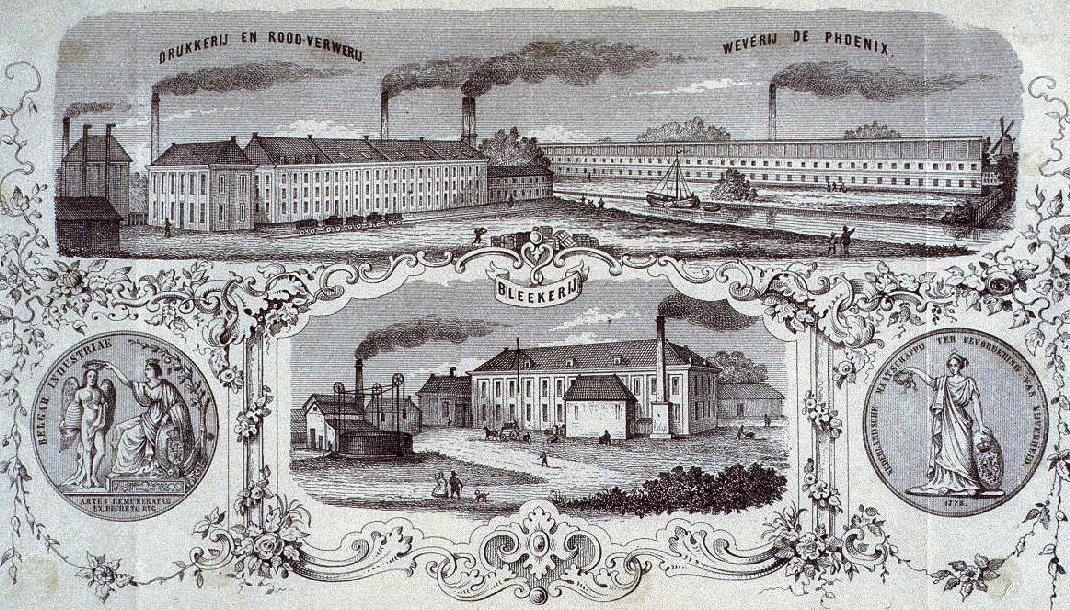
Cotton mills in Haarlem in the 19th century

The Nederlandsche Handel-Maatschappij (NHM or Dutch Trade Company) was founded by King Willem I to create employment opportunities. As one of the cities in the western part of the Netherlands with the worst economic situation, three cotton mills were created in Haarlem under the NHM-program in the 1830s. These were run by experts from the Southern Netherlands, whom the NHM considered better at mechanical weaving through the local expertise of Lieven Bauwens.

The contract winners were Thomas Wilson, whose factory was situated north of what is today the Wilsonplein, Guillaume Jean Poelman, who was in business with his nephew Charles Vervaecke from Ghent and had a factory on what today is the Phoenixstraat, and Jean Baptiste Theodore Prévinaire, who had a factory on the Garenkokerskade and whose son Marie Prosper Theodore Prévinaire created the Haarlemsche Katoenmaatschappij in 1875.

These cotton factories produced goods for export, and because the Dutch government levied heavy taxes on foreign cotton producers this was a profitable business for the NHM-factories, especially for export to the Dutch East Indies. The programme started in the 1830s, and was initially successful. However, after 1839 when Belgium split away from the United Kingdom of the Netherlands, the protectionist measures for the Dutch East Indian market were removed, and the business began to flounder. When the American Civil War reduced the import of raw cotton significantly after 1863, the business went sour. Only Prévinaire was able to survive through specialisation with his "Turkish Red" dye. The Prévinaire "toile Adrinople" was popular. Prévinaire's son went on to create the Haarlemsche Katoenmaatschappij, which made a kind of imitation batik cloth called "La Javanaise" that became popular in Belgian Congo.

==== Train and tram ====
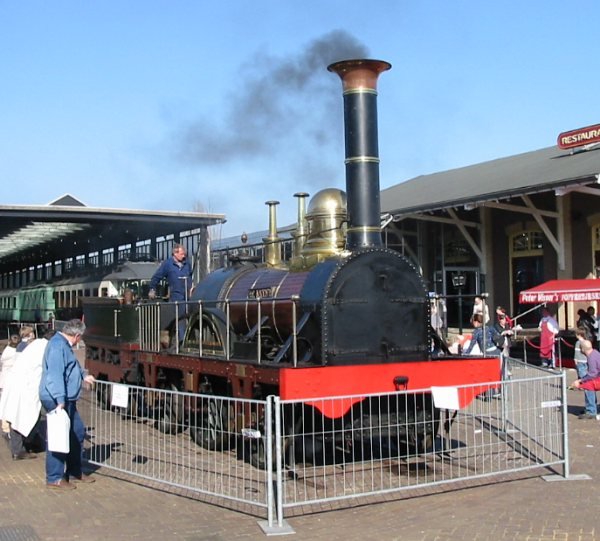
A replica of the Arend, one of two locomotives built by R. B. Longridge and Company for the Haarlem-Amsterdam railway line in the 1830s.

In England in 1804, Richard Trevithick designed the first locomotive. The government of the Netherlands was relatively slow to catch up, even though the king feared competition from newly established Belgium if it would construct a railway between Antwerp and other cities. The Dutch parliament balked at the high level of investment needed, but a group of private investors started the Hollandsche IJzeren Spoorweg-Maatschappij on 1 June 1836.

It took three years to build the first track on the railway, between Haarlem and Amsterdam along the old tow canal called the Haarlemmertrekvaart. The ground there was wet and muddy. On 20 September 1839, the first train service in the Netherlands started. The train had a speed of about 40 km/h (25 mph). The train service gave the Beijnes company, and indirectly the whole economy of Haarlem, a strong boost, and the effects of this can be seen in the Haarlem railway station, now a rijksmonument. Instead of more than two hours, Amsterdam was now only 30 minutes away.

The old passenger service by trekschuit along the Haarlemmertrekvaart was quickly taken out of service in favour of the train service, which was quicker and more reliable. In 1878, a Beijnes-made horse tram started servicing passengers from the railway station to the Haarlemmerhout woodland park, and in 1894, the Eerste Nederlandsche Electrische Tram Maatschappij (ENET) was founded with cars built by Beijnes and became the first Dutch electric tram, which ran in Haarlem from 1899 onwards.

==== Water management ====
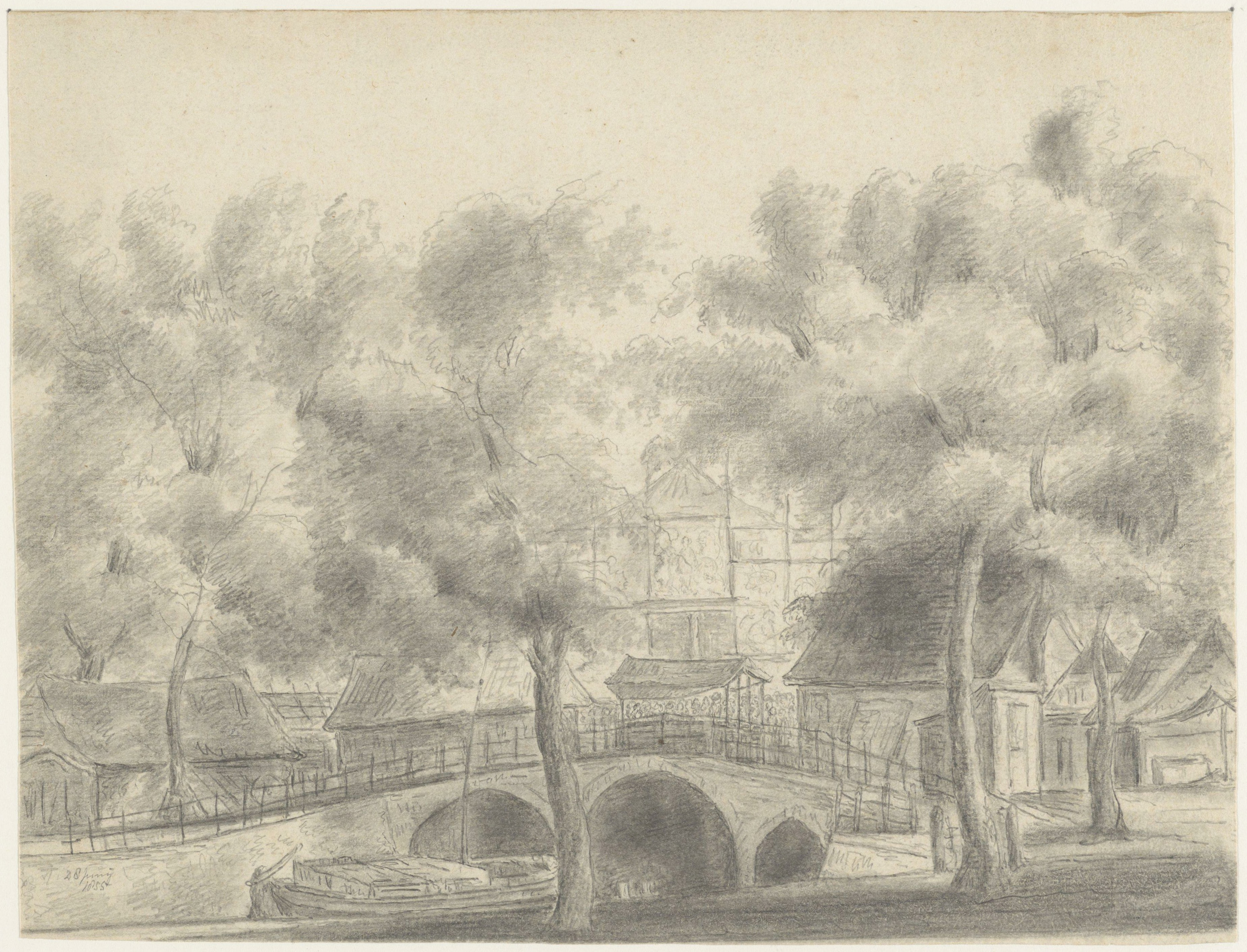
Drawing dated 1855 by Arnoldus Johannes Eymer of the Verwulft during a festival: tents can be seen above the wide arched "overclosure" while a small trekschuit is moored in the Oude Gracht, indicating a narrow clearance to pass underneath. The canal was filled in 4 years later in 1859.

Though the old trekvaart was closed for water traffic after railway development, it is still possible to travel by boat from Amsterdam to Haarlem, via the ringvaart or the North Sea Canal. Pleasure boating in the summer has become an important Haarlem tourist attraction, though it is not possible to travel all of the original canals as in Amsterdam. The creation of new land in the Haarlemmermeer polder from 1852 onwards meant that the city could no longer refresh the water in its canals from the Spaarne river. The increase in industry worsened water quality. In 1859, the Oude Gracht canal stank so badly in the summer that it not only forced visitors away, but posed a public health threat due to cholera outbreaks. It was filled in to create a new street called the Gedempte Oude Gracht. The periodic cholera outbreaks had not been new, but they had been increasing. In 1591, the city fathers had ordered excavation to build the Verwulft, a wide bridge over the Oude Gracht connecting the north and south portions of the Grote Houtstraat. Such "overclosures" can still be seen in other Dutch cities, such as the Nieuwmarkt in Amsterdam.

==== Expanding borders ====
From 1879, the population of the city almost doubled in thirty years, from 36,976 to 69,410 in 1909. Not only did the population grow, but the city was expanding rapidly, too. The Leidsebuurt district was incorporated into Haarlem in the 1880s. A small part of the (now defunct) municipality of Schoten was incorporated in 1884 because the council of Haarlem wanted to have the hospital (Het Dolhuys) inside the municipal borders. This hospital was situated at "het bolwerk" on Schoten's territory.

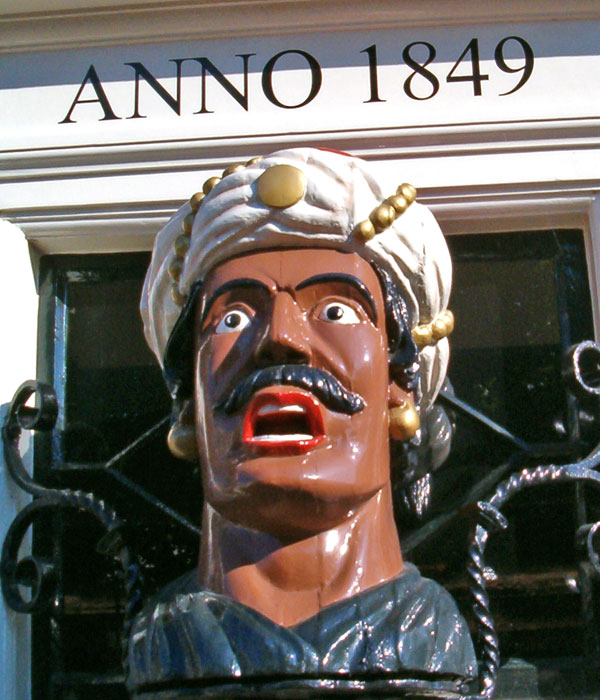
This Gaper is located on the front of Van der Pigge, a chemist's that declined to move for Vroom & Dreesmann's new department store in 1932.

=== Early 20th century ===
In the beginning of the 20th century, the city expanded north. As early as 1905, an official plan was presented by the Haarlem municipality for expansion. However, the surrounding municipalities did not agree, and it would take 25 years to come to an agreement. On 1 May 1927, the municipality of Schoten became part of Haarlem, as well as part of Spaarndam, Bloemendaal and Heemstede. The population increased at once with 31,184 citizens.

In 1908, a renewed railway station was opened. The tracks were elevated, so traffic in the city was no longer hampered by railway crossings. In 1911, Anthony Fokker showed his plane de Spin to the audience in Haarlem by flying around the Sint-Bavokerk on Queen's Day.

Later the expansion of the city went southwards (Schalkwijk) and eastwards (Waarderpolder). In 1932, Vroom & Dreesmann, a Dutch retailer built a department store at Verwulft. Many buildings were demolished, except one small chemist's shop on the corner, "Van der Pigge", who refused to be bought out and which is now encapsulated by the V&D building. They are therefore also called "David and Goliath" by locals.

=== Haarlem in World War II ===
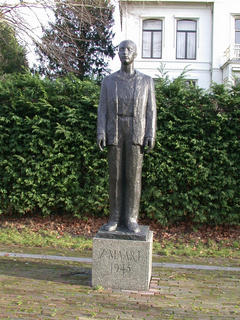
"Man in front of a firing squad", memorial by Mari Andriessen to commemorate 15 innocent victims chosen at random who were shot there by German occupational forces on 7 March 1945, Dreef, Haarlem

From 17 to 21 September 1944, parts of Haarlem-Noord (north of the Jan Gijzenvaart) were evacuated by the Germans to make way for a defensive line. The stadium of HFC Haarlem, the football club, was demolished. Hundreds of people had to leave their homes and were forced to stay with other citizens.

From 22 September 1944 to the end of the war, there was gas available only two hours per day. Electricity stopped on 9 October. The German occupiers built a thick, black wall through the Haarlemmerhout (in the south of the city), as well as at the Jan Gijzenvaart in the evacuated area. The wall was called Mauer-muur and was meant to help defend the city.

In February 1944, the family of Corrie ten Boom was arrested by the Nazis; they had been hiding Jews and Dutch resistance workers from the German occupier throughout the war.

During World War II, the Dutch heroine Hannie Schaft, who worked for a Dutch resistance group, was captured and executed by the German occupation just before the end of the war in 1945. Despite her efforts and those of her colleagues and private families such as the Ten Booms, most Haarlem Jews were deported, the Haarlem Synagogue was demolished, and the Jewish hospital was annexed by the St. Elisabeth Gasthuis. Several Haarlem families, whether they were politically active in the NSB or not, suffered from random attacks, as the Haarlem writer Harry Mulisch described in his book De Aanslag. Haarlemmers survived during the Hunger Winter by eating tulip bulbs stored in sheds in the sandy fields around the city.

=== Post-World War II ===
After the war, much of the large industry left the city, such as the banknote printing firm of Joh. Enschedé. The centre of industry and shipping shifted towards Amsterdam. Though the population had been decimated by starvation, a new wave of immigrants came to the city from the Dutch former colonies in Indonesia. This brought some government funding for building projects. In 1963, a large number of houses was built in Schalkwijk.

== Religion ==
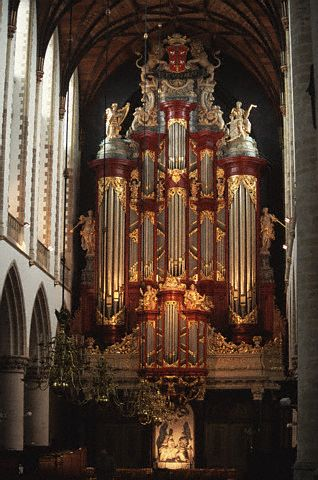
Pipe organ at Haarlem's Sint-Bavokerk. Mozart once played this organ.

Haarlem has had a Christian parish church since the 9th century. This first church was a "daughter church" of Velsen, which itself was founded in 695 by St. Willibrord. It was a wooden church at the site of the current Grote Kerk on the Grote Markt (central market square). Haarlem was granted its first known indulgence by Clement V in 1309, during the Avignon Papacy. In 1245 Haarlem received city rights as a result of population growth and the church was expanded. Later, after the fires of 1347 and 1351, Haarlem was again granted a Portiuncula indulgence in 1397 for funding to rebuild the church. This indulgence would be used again and again over the centuries to fund expansion and restoration activities.

Having been granted papal rights from Avignon was perhaps the reason that the ties to Rome were never very strong in Haarlem, since the building most commonly called the Cathedral in the centre of town only held a cathedra for 19 years, from 1559 to 1578. This Grote Kerk or Sint-Bavokerk was originally a parish church devoted to the Virgin Mary, but was later named after the patron saint of Haarlem, Saint Bavo, who descended from Heaven regularly to free the Haarlemmers from invaders, most recently when the Kennemers and West-Friesians attacked in 1274. This is allegedly how the Haarlem war cry "Sint Bavo voor Haarlem" originated, which was used during the siege against the Spaniards in 1572 that eventually resulted in an underground cathedra called the Sint Josephstatie, on the Goudsmitsplein.

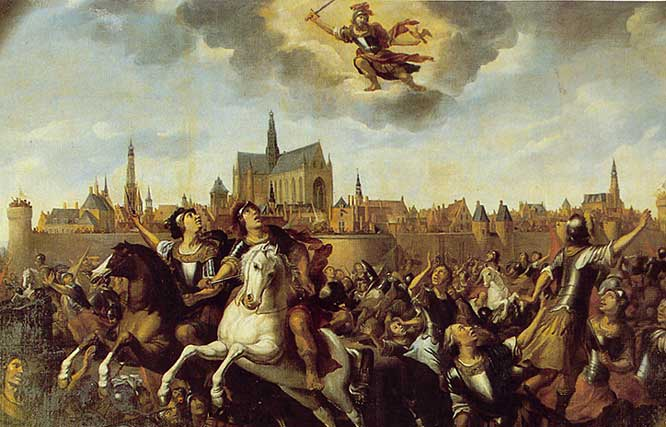
Saint Bavo saves Haarlem from the Kennemers. Dated 1673 but showing legend from 1274. In the background the Sint-Bavokerk (Grote Kerk) can be seen.

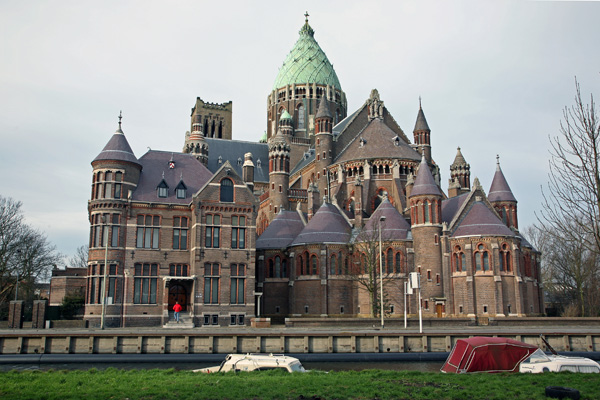
Cathedral of Saint Bavo

The Roman Catholic parish of Haarlem became a Diocese in 1559 (Dioecesis Harlemensis) and the first bishop of Haarlem was Nicolaas van Nieuwland (born in 1510). He accepted the position on 6 November 1561. In 1569 he was advised to resign by the Duke of Alva, because of his reputation for drinking (Dronken Klaasje). He had a good reason to drown his sorrows, because he feared the Catholic Spanish invaders as much as the native Dutch reformers. The Grote Kerk was initially spared from iconoclasm, because the city's mayor ordered the closing of the church for several months in 1566. That gave the various groups in Haarlem the time to quietly remove many of the treasures from the church and stash them safely in underground chapels. All symbols and statues linked to the Roman Catholic faith were removed from the cathedral. Since many groups already had their own chapels in the Grote Kerk, this was conducted in an orderly way. However, after the siege of Haarlem was lost, the Spanish army restored Roman Catholic iconography. The guilds had to restore their old altars, at great expense. Since Haarlem was quite poor after the siege, this led to many of the chapels and other Catholic churches being abandoned and used for other purposes. The Bakenesserkerk, where 1500 soldiers were held before being killed by the Spanish after their victory, was used to store turf for fifty years.

Van Nieuwland was succeeded by Godfried van Mierlo, who was the last bishop in communion with Rome Haarlem would know for 300 years. In 1578 after the Spanish were defeated, the church was attacked on Sacrament day (29 May), this time by soldiers of the Prince of Orange. One of the priests was killed, and many objects in the church were destroyed. This event, called the Haarlemse Noon, forced the bishop to flee the city. Many treasures were still safe 500 yards away in the underground Catholic church. The city council confiscated the Sint Bavo Kerk and all of its daughter churches, and later converted them along the tenets of the Evangelical Reformed Church. The new (and current) name became Grote Kerk. Old Catholics and the Lutherans, though unofficially tolerated, went underground. Both Protestants and Catholics alike felt that when all political unrest had subsided, the Catholics could regain control of "their" church. However, the Dutch Protestants had also removed all Catholics from local government and feared that they would have to pay damages to the Catholics if they were allowed their own churches again.

In the 19th century, all over the Netherlands, new Catholic churches were subsidised, called Waterboard churches, for their similarity to Waterboard pump stations (they were designed by the same architect in Neo-classical style), and in Haarlem they built the St. Joseph kerk in the Jansstraat in 1841. It was not until 1853 that a new Roman Catholic bishop was installed in the St. Joseph kerk. As this church grew, a new cathedral, again called the Cathedral of Saint Bavo, was built at the Leidsevaart (canal to Leiden) in 1898. The Bishop of Haarlem has a formal residence on the Nieuwe Gracht canal.

There is also an Old Catholic bishop of Haarlem.

There is still a small Jewish community with their own synagogue.

The Frans Hals Museum, which was the Haarlem municipal museum, has still in its collection today many pieces confiscated from the churches during the Haarlemse Noon.

== Demographics ==
As of 2020, Haarlem had a total population of 162,090 people.

=== Inhabitants by origin ===
2020	Numbers	%
Dutch natives	112,696	69.1%
Western migration background	23,335	14.3%
Non-Western migration background	26,871	16.4%
Turkey	6,718	4.1%
Morocco	5,393	3.3%
Indonesia	4,634	2.84%
Netherlands Antilles and Aruba	1,134	0.69%
Suriname	2,211	1.35%
Total	162,902	100%

== Culture and entertainment ==
=== Museums ===
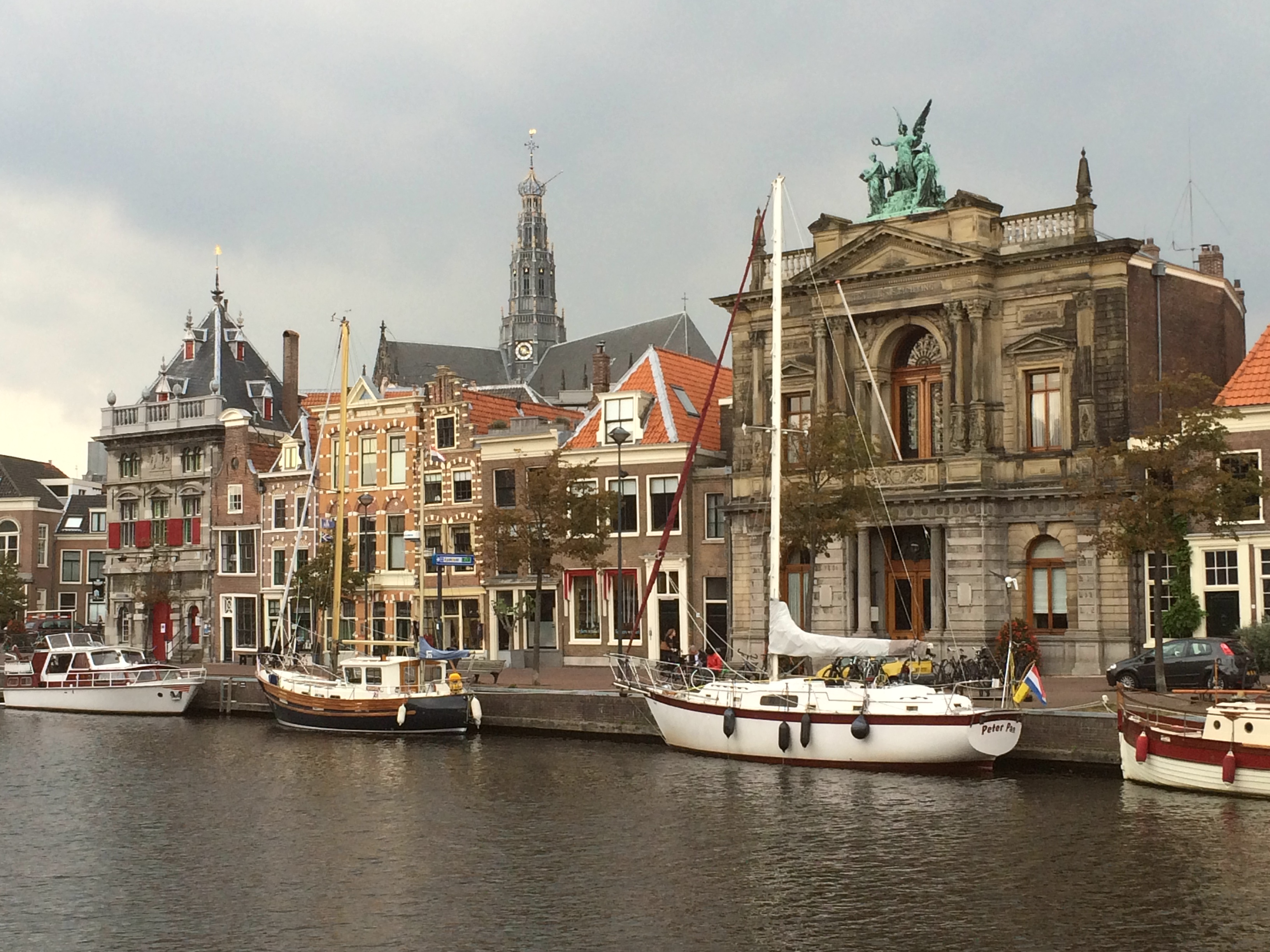
Teylers Museum in Haarlem

There are several museums in Haarlem. The Teylers Museum lies on the Spaarne river, and it is the oldest museum of the Netherlands. Its main subjects are art, science, and natural history, and it owns a number of works by Michelangelo and Rembrandt. Another museum is the Frans Hals Museum of fine arts, with its main location housing Dutch master paintings, and its exhibition halls on the Grote Markt housing a gallery for modern art called De Hallen. Also on the Grote Markt, in the cellar of the Vleeshal is the Archeologisch Museum Haarlem, while across the square on Saturdays, the Hoofdwacht building is open with exhibitions on Haarlem history.

Other museums include the Barrel Organ Museum Haarlem, Museum van de Geest (a museum of psychiatry), the Ten Boom Museum (a hiding place for Jews in World War II) and the Historisch Museum Haarlem, across from the Frans Hals Museum.

=== Theater, film and cultural centres ===
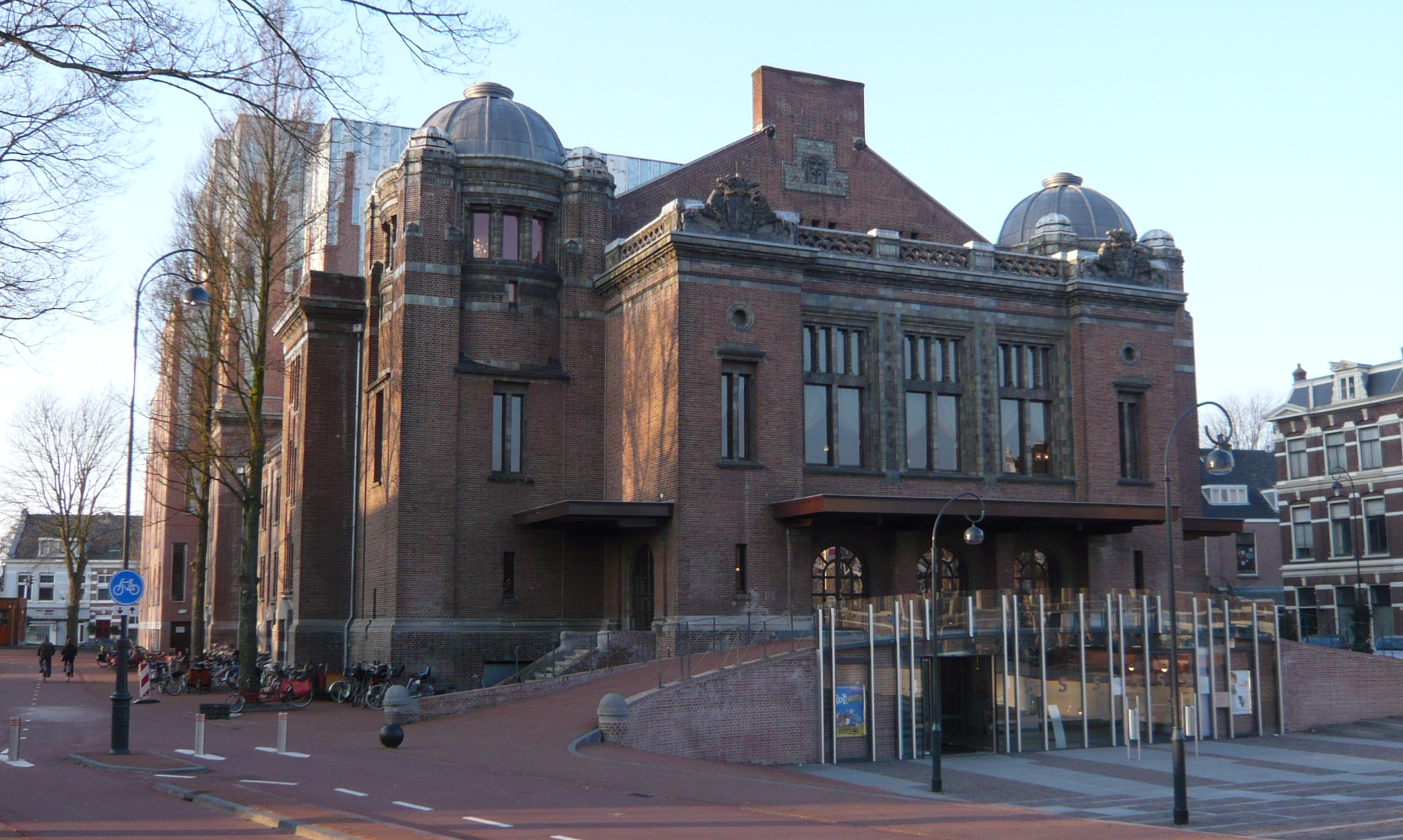
Stadsschouwburg, theater on the Wilsonplein

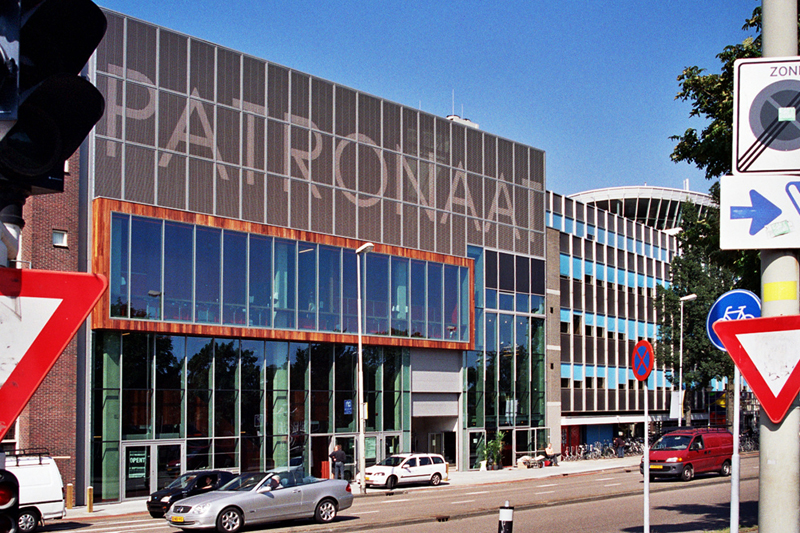
Patronaat pop music hall

The city contains several theatres, a cinema and other cultural attractions. The Philharmonie (Phil) is a concert hall in the centre of the city, near the Grote Markt. Next to it is the Schuur theatre, which also has some movie theatres (previously referred to as the Filmschuur). The Stadsschouwburg on the Wilsonsplein reopened in 2008 after a major renovation and can seat 698.

The Cinema Palace was established in 1915 and was one of the older cinemas in the Netherlands. It closed definitively on 15 January 2011. The Brinkmann cinema, located on the Grote Markt, closed on 1 February 2012. There are currently two cinemas in Haarlem, in addition to Schuur. Pathé Haarlem is located in the Raaks shopping mall and opened on 5 July 2011. Filmkoepel is located in the former Koepelgevangenis prison and opened in 2022.

The Patronaat is a pop music hall, one of the larger of its kind in the Netherlands. It is a popular night spot in the city.

=== Festivals ===
Every year in April, the bloemencorso (flower parade) takes place. Floats decorated with flowers drive from Noordwijk to Haarlem, where they are exhibited for one day. In the same month there is also a funfair organised on the Grote Markt and the Zaanenlaan in Haarlem-Noord. Other festivals are held on the Grote Markt as well, in particular the annual Haarlem Jazz & More (formerly known as Haarlem Jazzstad), a music festival; Haarlem Culinair, a culinary event; and the biannual Haarlemse Stripdagen (Haarlem comic days).

Bevrijdingspop is a music festival to celebrate the Dutch liberation from the Nazis after World War II. It is held every year on 5 May, the day that the Netherlands were liberated in 1945, at the Haarlemmerhout. At the same location, the Haarlemmerhoutfestival is held every year, which is a music and theatre festival.

=== Sports ===
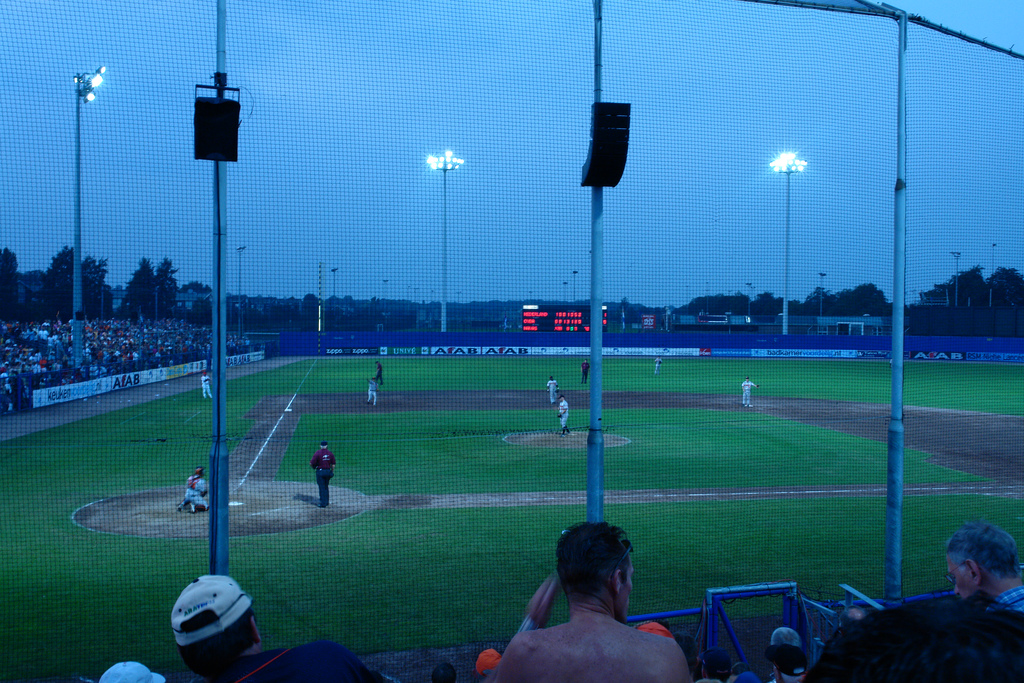
Haarlem Baseball Week 2006 at the Pim Mulier Stadium

Haarlem has different sport clubs practicing diversity of sports.

There are several amateur association football clubs. Haarlem also had a professional football club, HFC Haarlem, which went bankrupt in January 2010. Another Haarlem based football club still in existence is Koninklijke HFC (Royal Haarlemsche Football Club). It was founded by Pim Mulier in 1879 as the first football club in the Netherlands, making it the oldest club in Dutch history.

Tennis club HLTC Haarlem, founded in 1884, and judo association Kenamju, founded in 1948, are also the oldest Dutch clubs in their sports. RFC Haarlem is a rugby club.

Haarlem is known for hosting several international sports tournaments as well: the Haarlemse Honkbalweek (Haarlem Baseball Week), a baseball event held every two years at the Pim Mulier Stadium (named after Pim Mulier), and the Haarlem Basketball Classic, a basketball event. Haarlem also hosted the 2014 Women's Softball World Championship.

The first international bandy match was played between Haarlem and Bury Fen Bandy Club in 1891. Some rink bandy exists today.

=== Cultural references ===
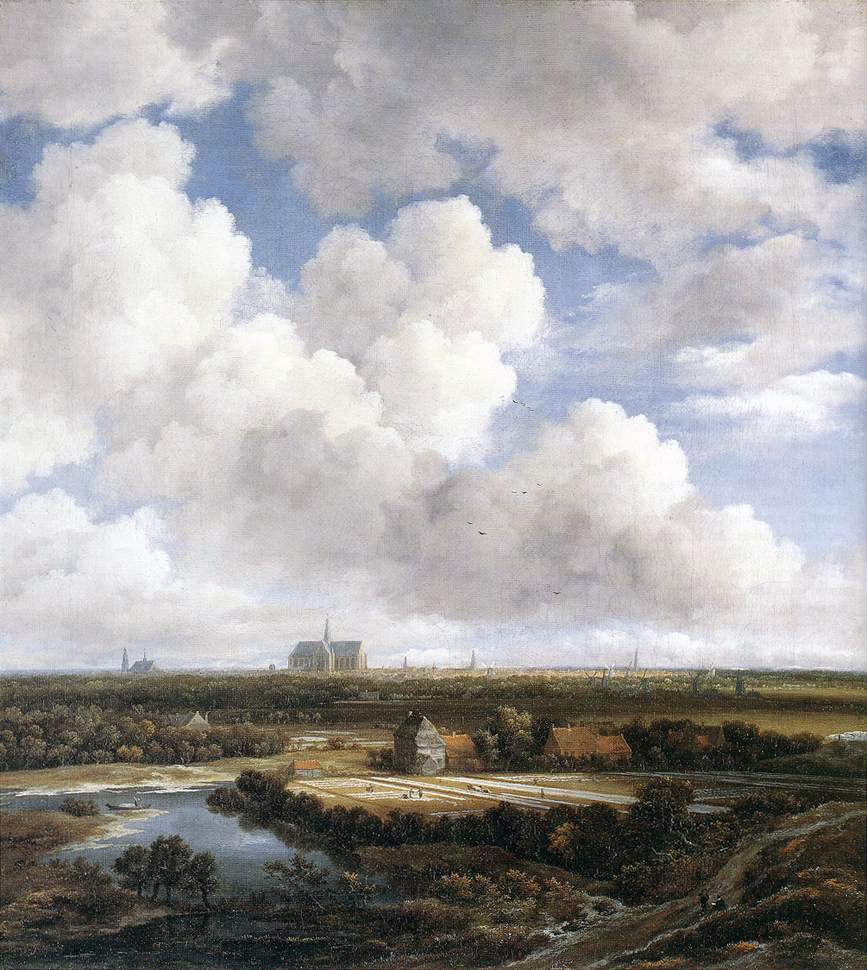
View of Haarlem with Bleaching Fields by Jacob van Ruisdael (c. 1665)

- The story of a boy who saved the city with his finger in a leaking dike is known as the "Hero of Haarlem."
- Folk singer Al Stewart mentions Haarlem in his song "Amsterdam".
- The train station of Haarlem was part of a set during the movie Ocean's Twelve, showing Amsterdam Central Station.
- The book Confessions of an Ugly Stepsister by Gregory Maguire is set in Haarlem.
- The book The Black Tulip by Alexandre Dumas, père has several scenes in Haarlem, most notably the ending, and it is the Horticultural Society of Haarlem that offers a reward for a black tulip.
- In 1628 a chemist in Haarlem goes broke, and decides to join the VOC to sail to the East. His name, Jeronimus Cornelisz, will always be connected with the Batavia ship.
- Panoramic views of the Haarlem skyline became so popular in the 17th century that a specific term was used to describe them: a Haerlempje. The most famous Haerlempjes were painted by Jacob van Ruisdael, for instance View of Haarlem with Bleaching Fields.
- Famous Dutch radio DJ Giel Beelen was born in Haarlem. He started his career at the local radio station Haarlem 105. He currently still lives in Haarlem.
- Corrie ten Boom, born in Amsterdam, lived in Haarlem for a long time. She, along with her family, was responsible for shelter many Jewish people in their house during World War II. Her history is featured in the book The Hiding Place. In 1967 Corrie was honored as Righteous Among The Nations.

=== Buildings and locations ===
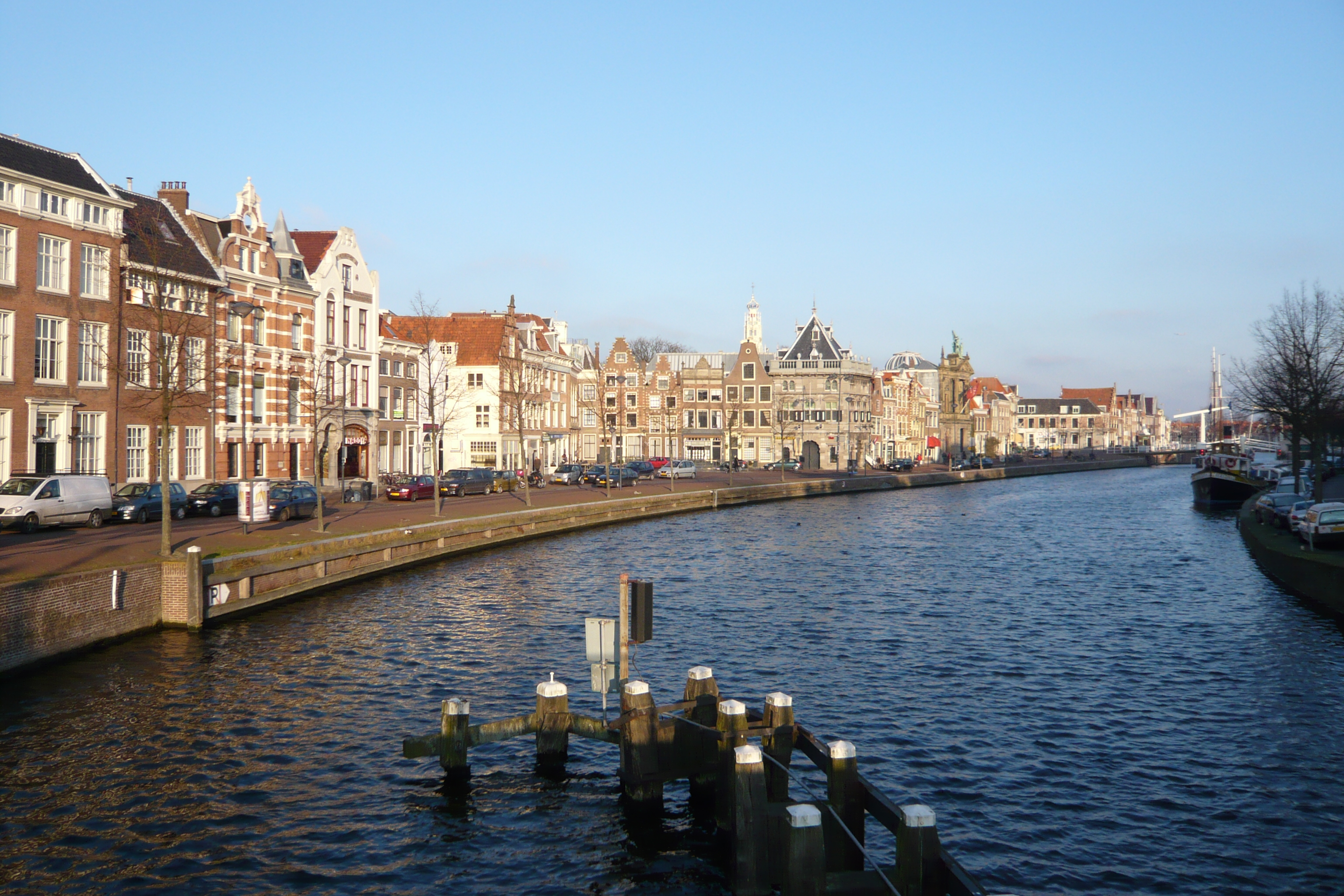
River Spaarne through Haarlem

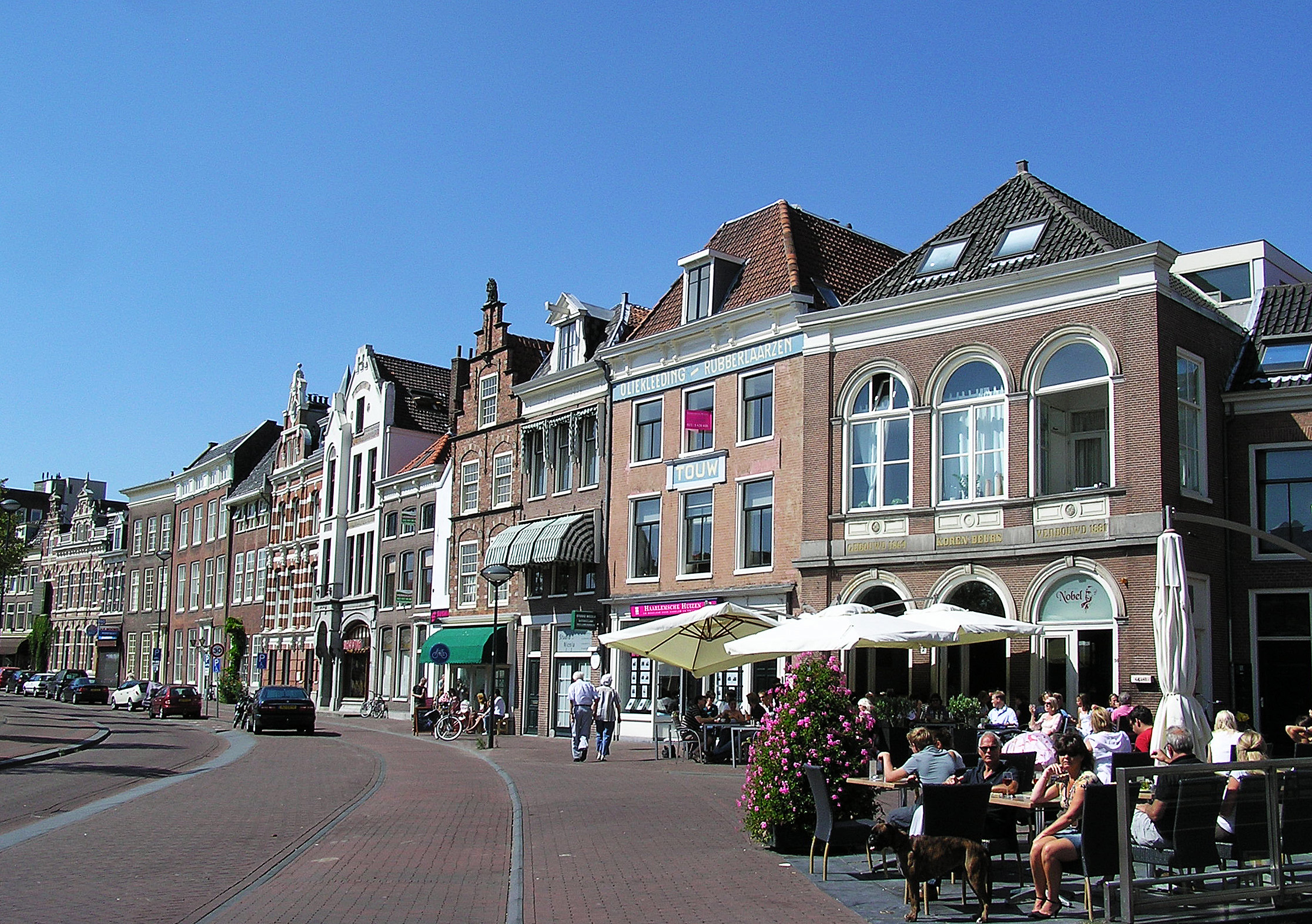
The Street of Donkere Spaarne near Spaarne River

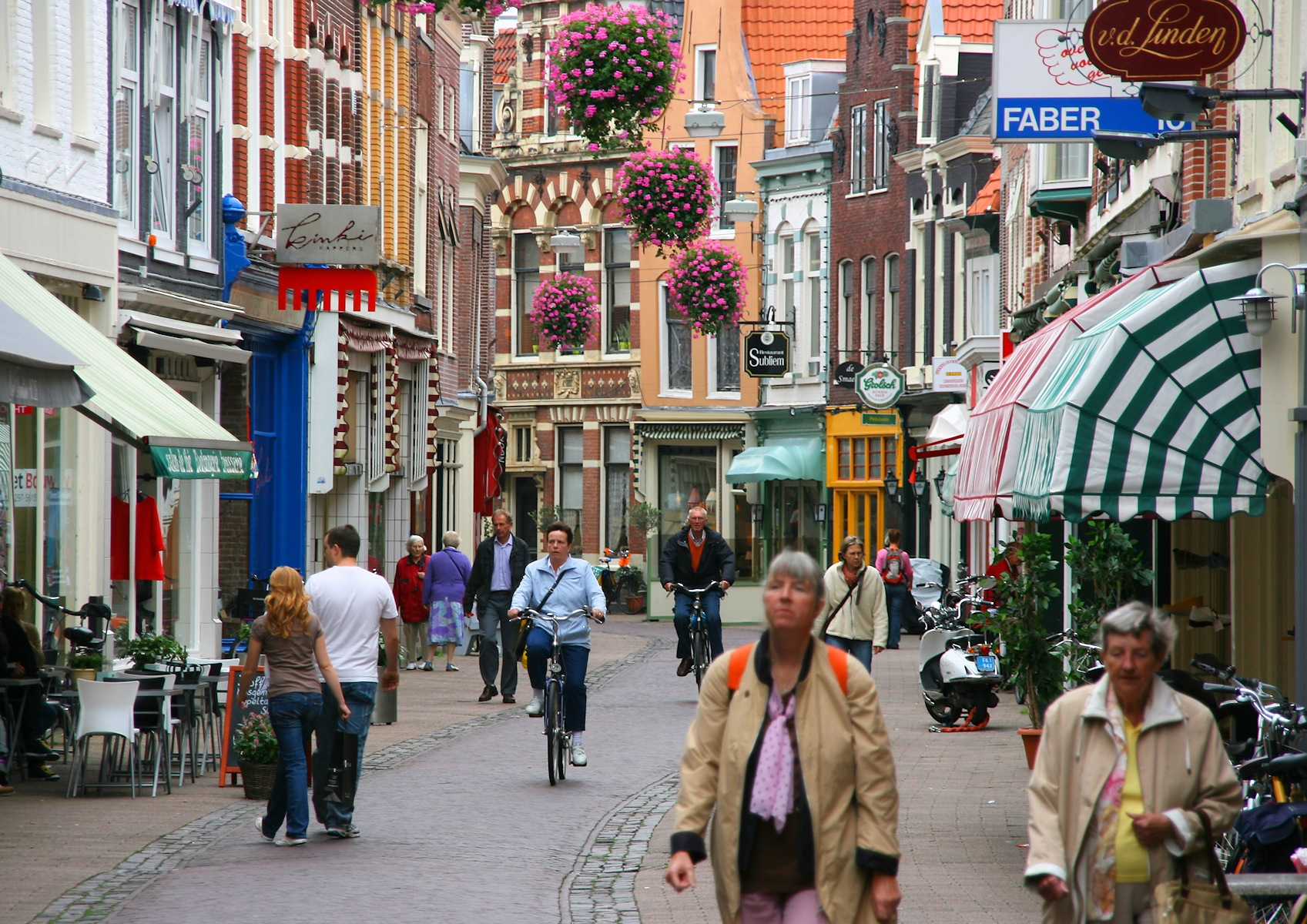
Kleine Houtstraat street in summer

Since the 18th century, Haarlem has historically had more museums per inhabitant than any other city of the Netherlands. It also has the highest number of defunct museums per inhabitant.

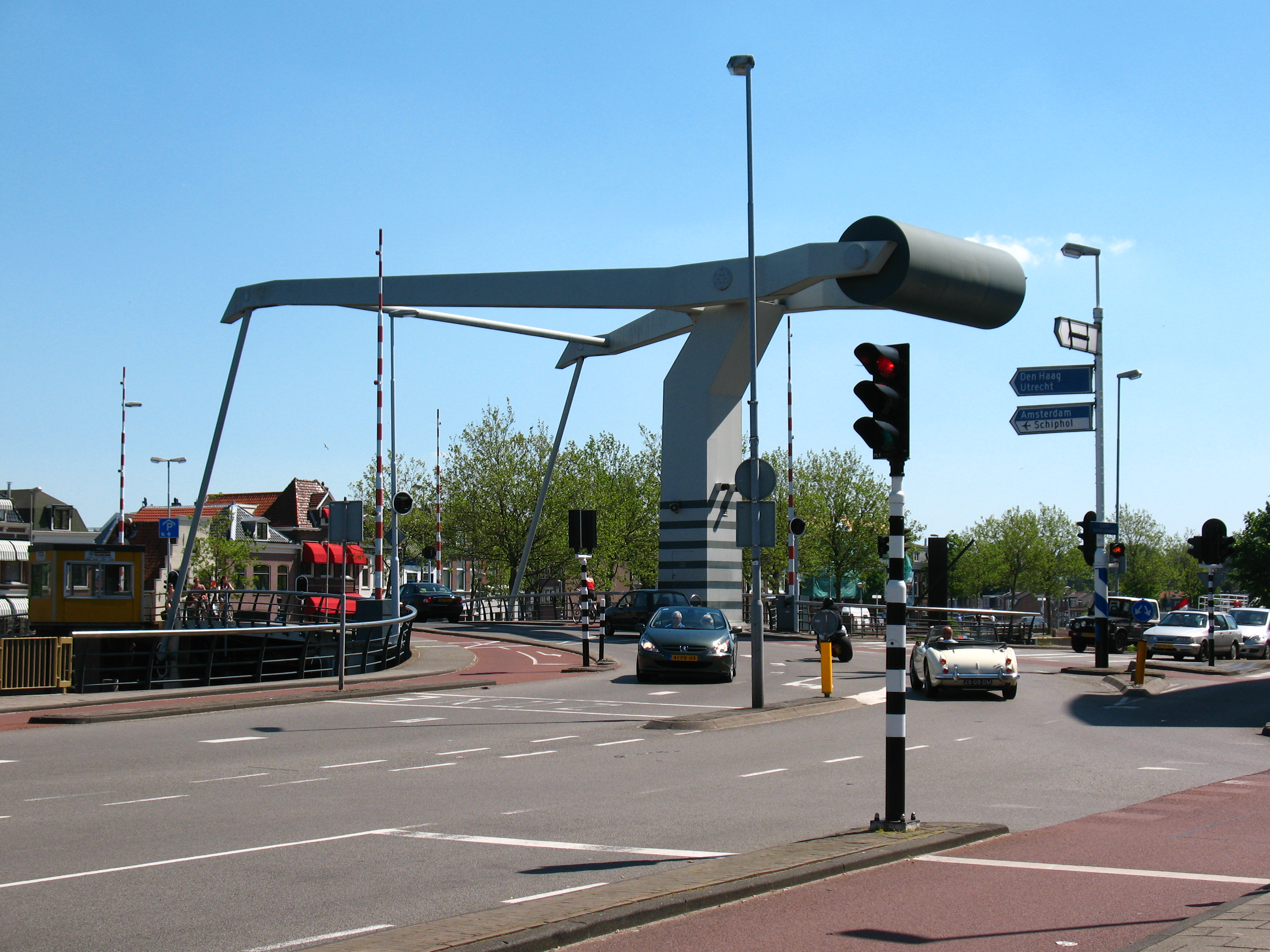
Lange Brug (Long Bridge), in popular speech also known as "de verfroller" ("the paint roller").

- The city is notable for its many hofjes: almshouses built around courtyards. These were mainly privately funded houses for elderly single women. Nowadays there are 19 hofjes in Haarlem; many open to the public on weekdays. Many hofjes are still owned by the original foundations, and are still mainly used for single elderly women.
- The Grote Markt (central market square), with the:
  - City Hall
  - Vleeshal or meat market (home to two museums)
  - Hoofdwacht
  - Grote or Sint-Bavokerk
- Stadsbibliotheek Haarlem, the Haarlem Public Library, an historic landmark
- The Janskerk has an exhibition area in the former choir
- Castle ruin Huis ter Kleef
- The Teylers Museum is the oldest museum of the Netherlands
- Frans Hals Museum of Art
- Haarlem Historisch Museum
- The Ten Boom Museum
- Museum van de Geest Museum of Psychiatry
- Windmill De Adriaan
- The Amsterdamse Poort city gate
- The art nouveau railway station of Haarlem
- Theater De Toneelschuur
- Villa Welgelegen (parts are open to the public)
- Haarlemmerhout park
- The Bosch and Vaart neighbourhood
- The monumental buildings of the Stedelijk Gymnasium Haarlem Latin School of Haarlem, also host of the Haarlem Model United Nations

==== Lautje, statue on the Grote Markt ====
On the main square, the Grote Markt, stands a statue of Laurens Janszoon Coster, nicknamed 'Lautje' by locals. Laurens Janszoon Coster is credited with being the inventor of a printing press using movable type, since he's said to have invented it simultaneously with Johannes Gutenberg, but only some people believe this. In the past, the statue was moved a couple of times. It once stood at the other side of the square and even perched at the Riviervismarkt, near the Philharmonie.

=== Local beer ===
Beer brewing has been a very important industry for Haarlem going back to the 15th century, when there were no fewer than 100 breweries in the city. When the town's 750th anniversary was celebrated in 1995 a group of enthusiasts re-created an original Haarlem beer and brewed it again. The beer is called Jopenbier, or Jopen for short, named after an old type of beer barrel.

== Transport ==
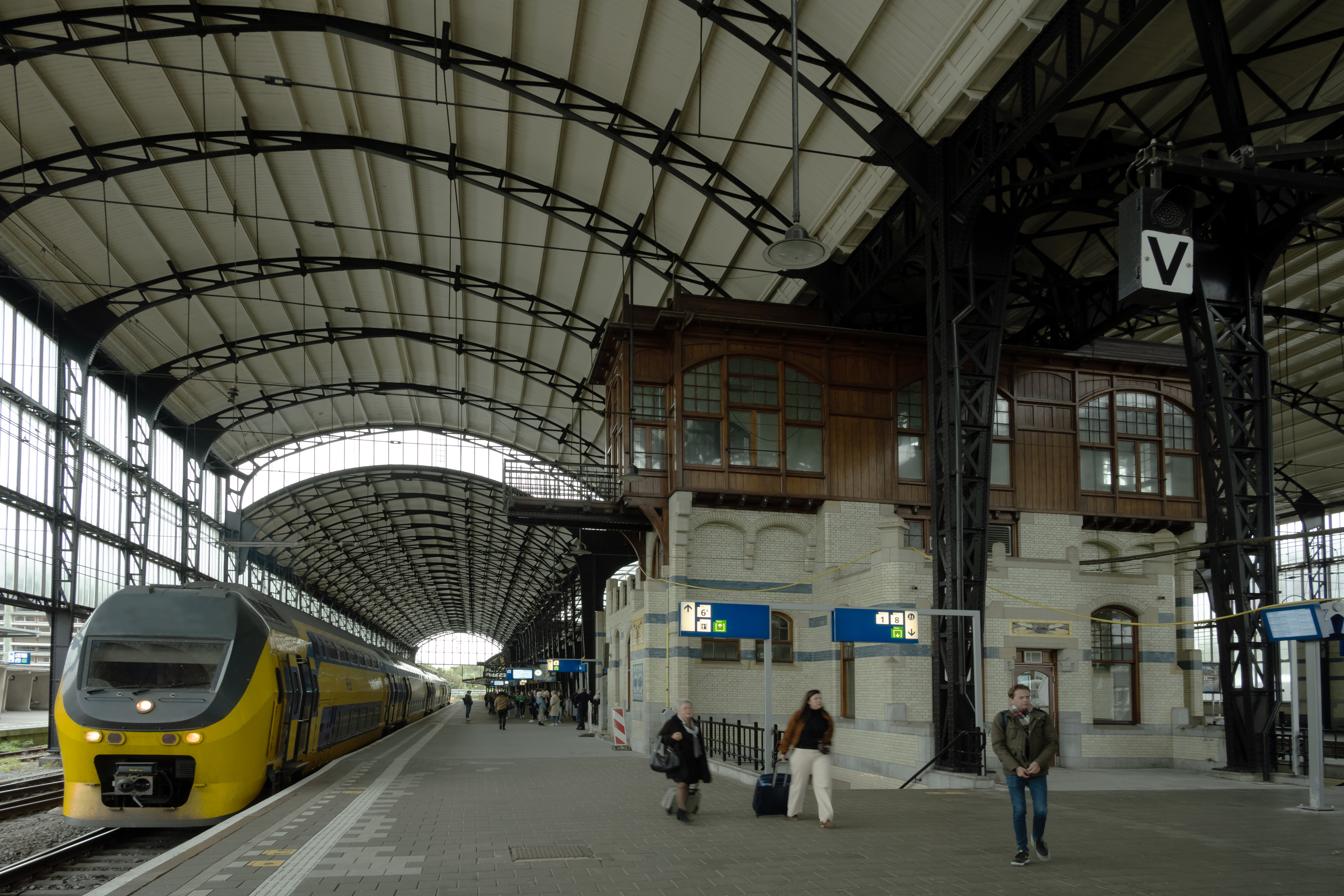
Haarlem railway station, built in 1906, one of the older train stations in the Netherlands. It replaced the original station at the Oude Weg dating from 1839, which was one of the first two stations in the Netherlands as part of the oldest Dutch railway line between Amsterdam and Haarlem.

Haarlem is served by two railway stations of the Nederlandse Spoorwegen (Dutch Railways). From Haarlem railway station there are 8 trains an hour to Amsterdam, with a journey time of 15 to 20 minutes, 6 trains an hour to Leiden and The Hague (two stations), and 2 trains an hour to Zandvoort aan Zee. On the east of Haarlem, there is Haarlem Spaarnwoude, which has 4 trains per hour to Amsterdam.

The city is also served by several bus lines of Connexxion. These buses traverse a large region around Haarlem, including Amsterdam. There is a special bus rapid transit too, called the Zuidtangent, which is operated by Connexxion. This bus goes from Haarlem to Amsterdam South East via Schiphol Airport.

== Local government ==
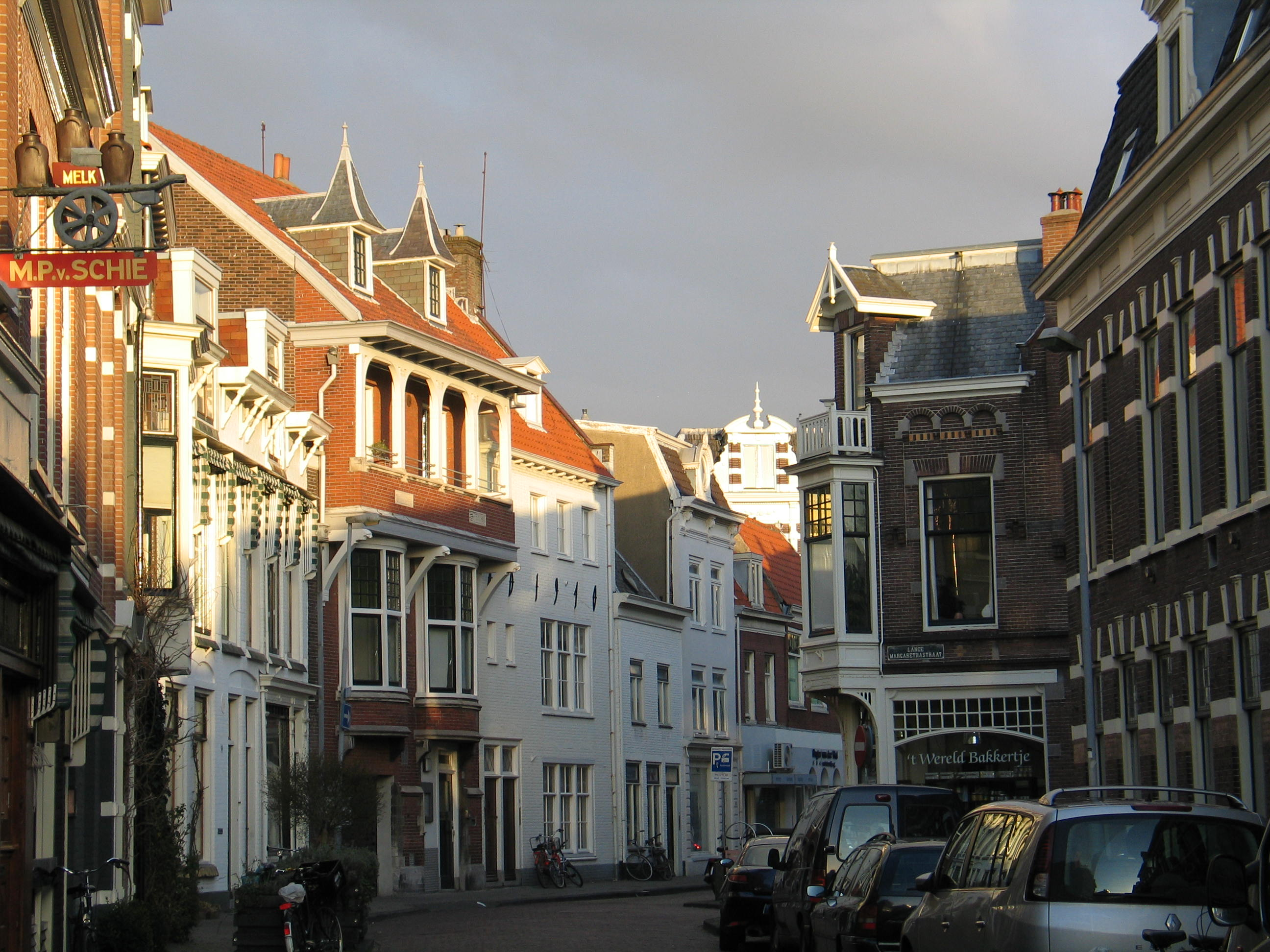
Street in Haarlem

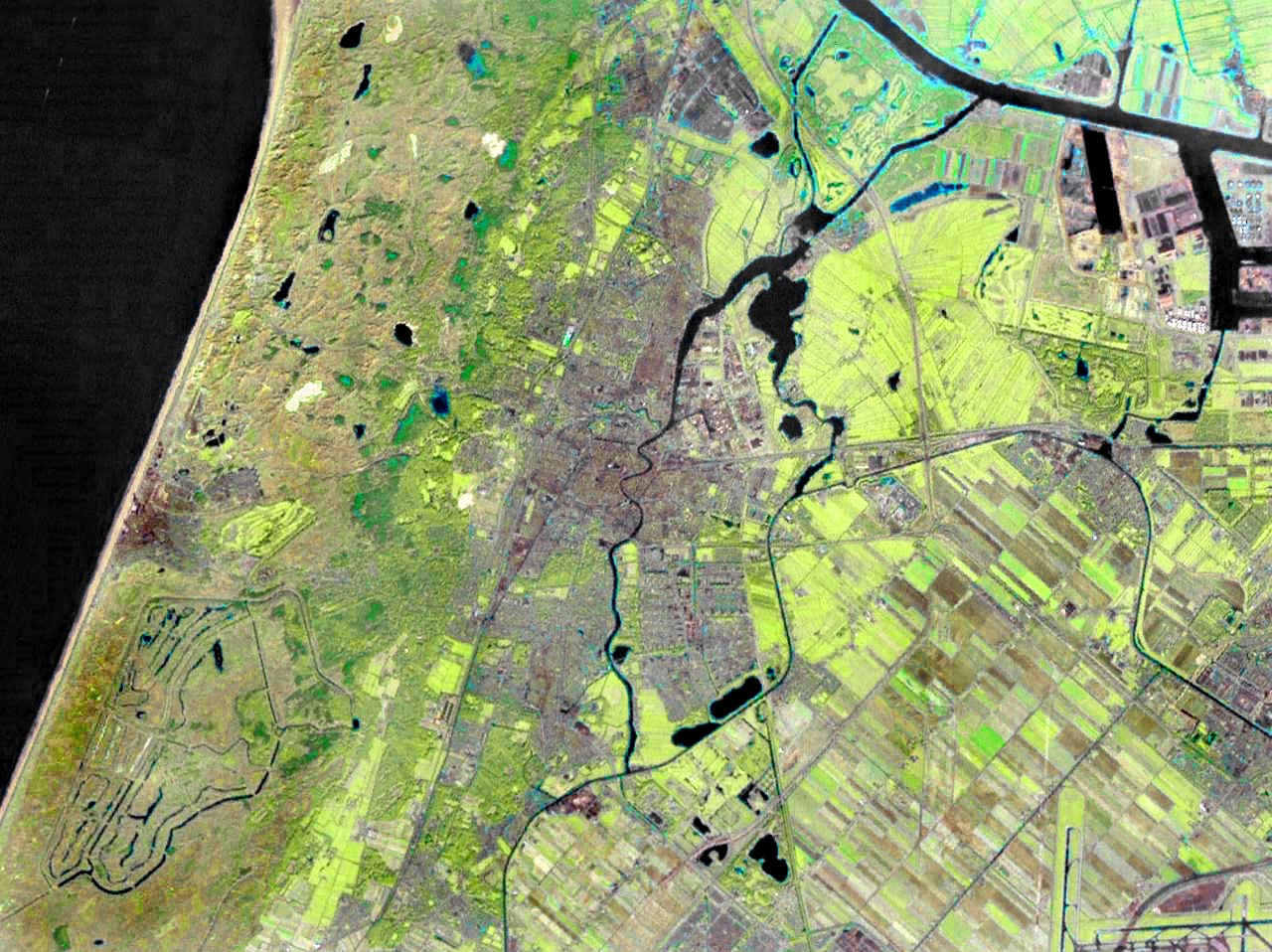
Satellite image of Haarlem

The municipal council of Haarlem consists of 39 seats. At the 2026 municipal elections the council divided as follows:

- GroenLinks / PvdA – 11 seats
- D66 – 8 seats
- VVD – 4 seats
- Forum for Democracy – 3 seats
- SP – 2 seats
- Party for the Animals (Partij voor de Dieren) – 2 seats
- CDA – 2 seats
- Jouw Haarlem – 2 seats
- Trots op Nederland (TROTS) – 1 seat
- Hart voor Haarlem – 1 seat
- OPHaarlem – 1 seats
- Volt – 1 seat
- Actiepartij – 1 seat

=== Police and law enforcement ===
The police services in Haarlem are provided by the Kennemerland police corps. The city of Haarlem also employs uniformed municipal enforcement officers, their duties consist of parking, sanitation, traffic, permit enforcement, and patrols throughout the city.

=== Meat advertisement ban ===
In September 2022, the Haarlem municipal council adopted an ordinance prohibiting advertisements for meat and fossil fuels in public spaces because of their climate impact. The ordinance took effect in 2024, making Haarlem the first city in the world to ban such advertisements. Note that the buying and selling of meat has been illegal in the south asian town Palitana, since 2014. The cities of Amsterdam, Utrecht and Nijmegen have now implemented the same policy, with Nijmegen banning dairy advertisements, too.

== Education ==
=== Universities ===
The group of universities SRH opened a campus in Haarlem in 2022 on the site of the former Cupola prison.

== Twin cities ==
Haarlem is twinned with:

- Osnabrück, Germany, since 1961
- Angers, France, since 1964
- Harlem (New York), United States, since 2017
- Mutare, Zimbabwe, since 1992

=== Harlem, Manhattan ===
In 1658, Peter Stuyvesant, the Director-General of the Dutch colony of Nieuw Nederland (New Netherland), founded the settlement of Nieuw Haarlem in the northern part of Manhattan Island as an outpost of Nieuw Amsterdam (New Amsterdam) at the southern tip of the island. After the English capture of New Netherland in 1664, the new English colonial administration renamed both the colony and its principal city "New York," but left the name of Haarlem more or less unchanged. The spelling changed to Harlem in keeping with contemporary English usage, and the district grew (as part of the borough of Manhattan) into the vibrant centre of African American culture in New York City and the United States generally by the 20th century.

== See also ==
- People from Haarlem
- Zuid-Kennemerland National Park
- Harlem
