= Pieter Holsteyn II =

Dutch Golden Age painter and engraver

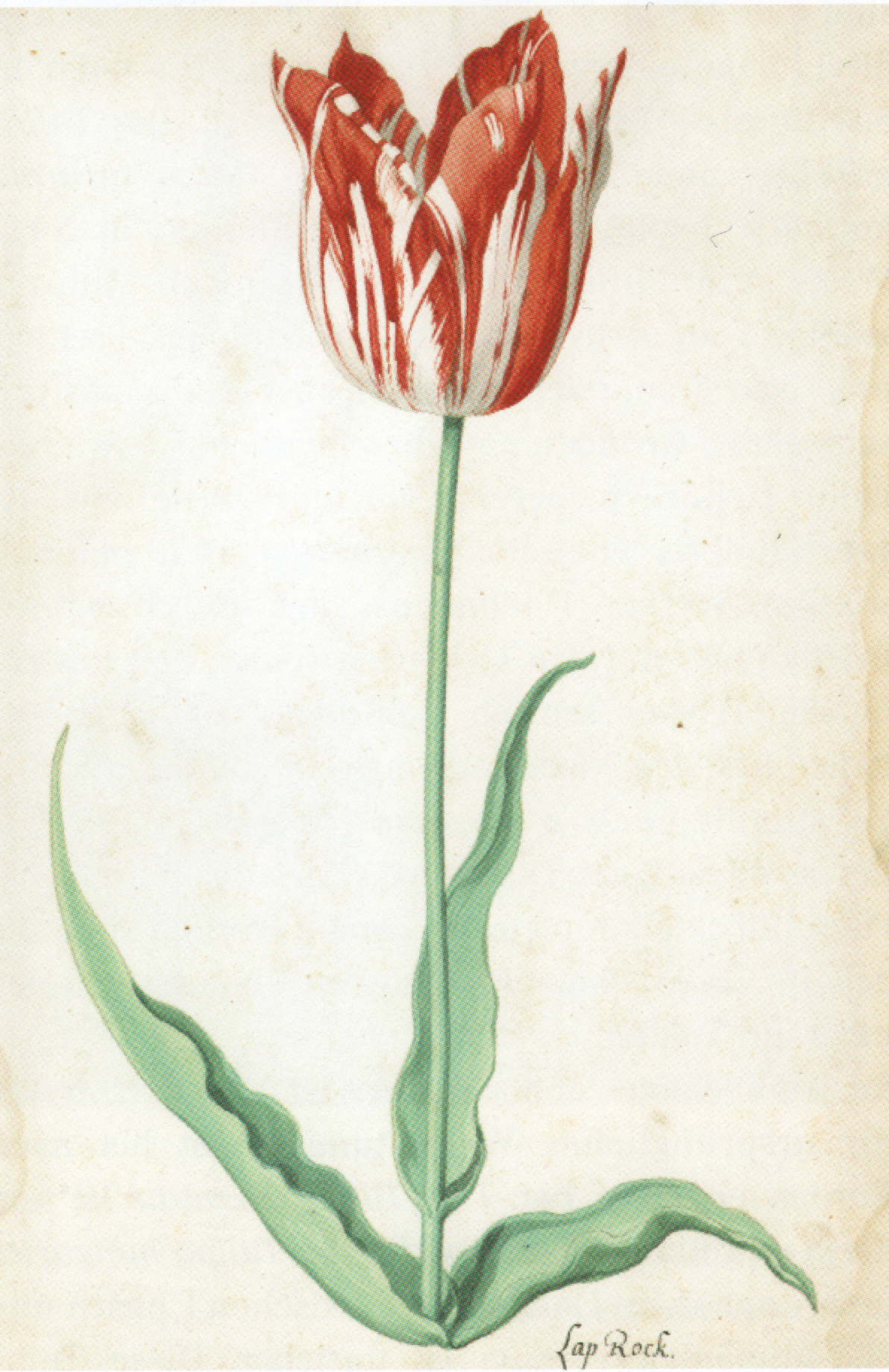
Tulip called "Lap Rock", single page of what was once a tulip book, water colour on paper

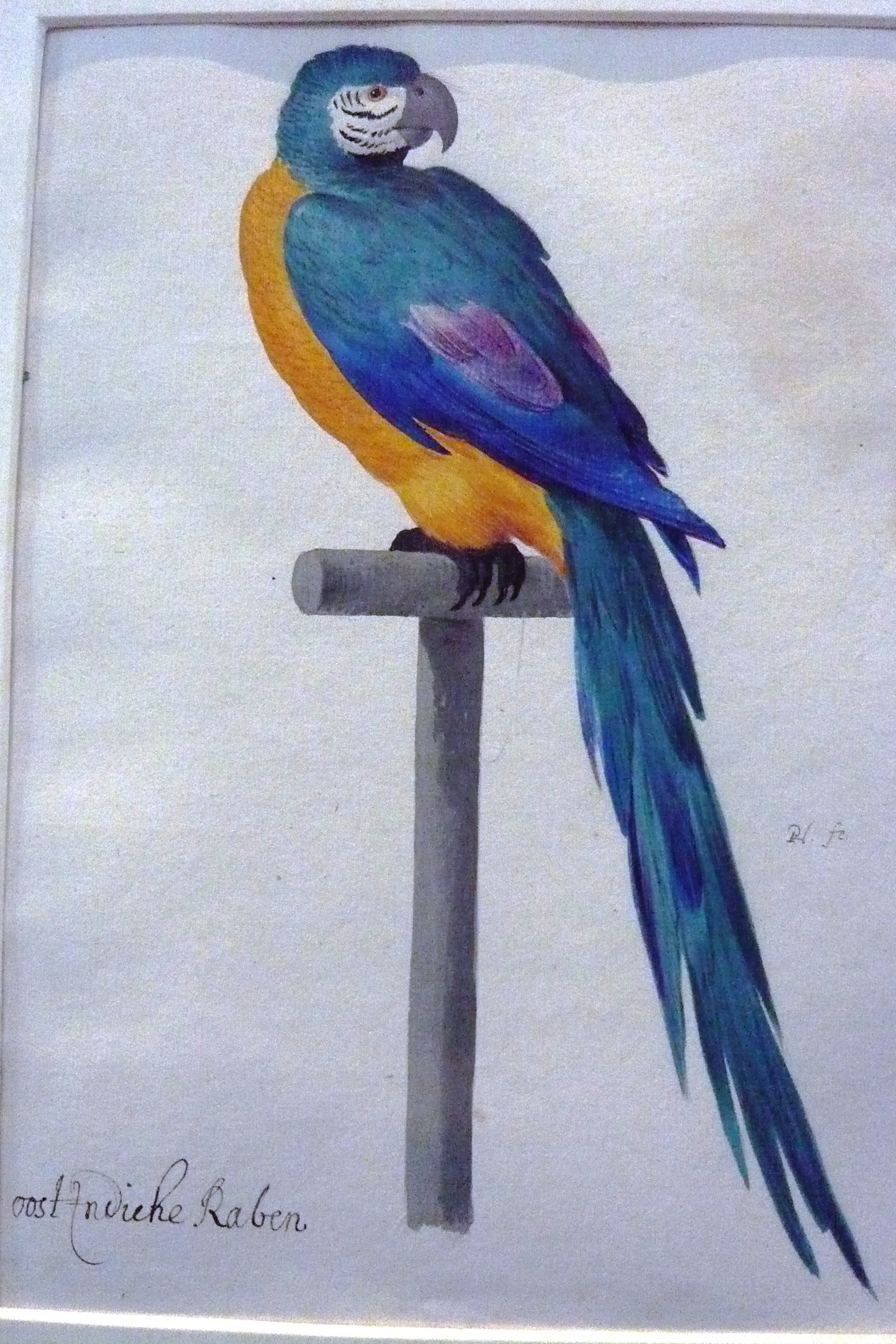
Oostindische Raben, or East Indian raven, signed PH fe (Pieter Holsteyn fecit), formerly in the collection of Joh. Enschedé, Haarlem, and possibly one of the birds that Houbraken mentioned in the auction sale of 1706

Pieter Holsteyn (1614, Haarlem – 1673, Haarlem), was a Dutch Golden Age watercolor painter and engraver.

== Biography ==
According to Houbraken who called him "Holstein", his father Pieter Holsteyn I was a good glass painter and his brother Cornelis was a good painter. Houbraken quoted Samuel Ampzing who mentioned Holstein together with Johannes Boeckhorst as good glasspainters who painted the scenes of the damiaatjes story in the magistrate's room in the Haarlem City Hall. In his biographical sketch of Rochus van Veen Houbraken mentioned the auction of watercolor paintings in Haarlem in 1706 of insects and birds that were painted in the style of Pieter Holsteyn.

According to the RKD he was the son of Pieter I and the brother of Cornelis. He worked in Haarlem, Amsterdam, Munster and Enkhuizen and was the teacher of the painter Josua Breckerveld. He signed his works with the monogram "PH". The painter Herman Henstenburgh was influenced by his watercolors.
