= Coat of arms of Haarlem =

The coat of arms of Haarlem

The coat of arms of Haarlem is the official symbol of the city of Haarlem. The sword and stars can be found as public decorations throughout the city.

== Heraldic elements ==
=== Escutcheon ===
The shield on the flag of Haarlem

The coat of arms of Haarlem consists of a red shield with a silver sword with golden handle under a white Jerusalem cross and flanked by 4 white six-pointed stars. Above the shield is the Imperial Crown of Austria under barren branches holding two Damiate bells, all held up by two golden lions standing on the motto of Haarlem. Several heraldic elements have their basis in the history of Haarlem. The motto of Haarlem is Vicit vim virtus (Latin for virtue conquered violence). The barren branches refer to the burned trees in the Haarlemmerhout, which were burned again and again during various sieges, most notably during the siege by the army of Jacqueline, Countess of Hainaut in 1428. Haarlem had taken side with the Cods in the Hook and Cod wars, and thus against Jacoba of Bavaria. The bells refer to the damiaatjes. Two bells were given to the city of Haarlem's St. Bavochurch to commemorate the heroic cutting of the harbour chain during the Siege of Damietta (1218) with a "saw ship", a legendary ship equipped with an iron saw fastened along the bow and front keel. This ship sawed through the harbour chain and allowed the fleet to successfully attack the city.

=== Wapenvermeerdering ===
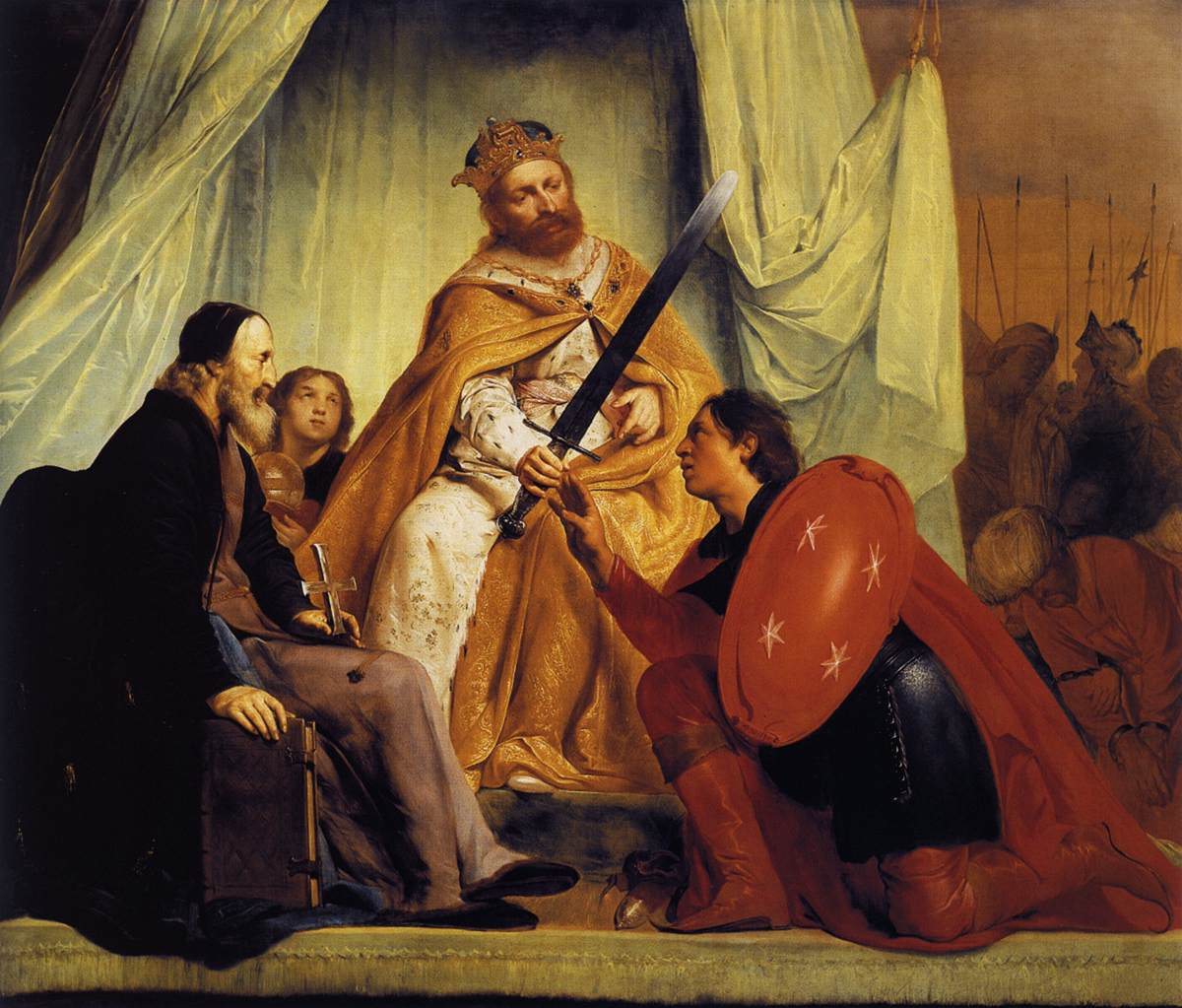
Haarlem receives a sword for its shield from the German emperor in thanks for the victory in Damietta during the 5th crusade. Scene is now referred to as "the legend of the Haarlem shield". By Pieter de Grebber, 1630, Haarlem City Hall

According to local legend, the original shield of Haarlem contained simply the four stars on a red background. As a result of the heroic deeds in Damietta, the Holy Roman Emperor granted Haarlem the usage of a sword and the Patriarch of Jerusalem granted the use of a cross. This story is known as the "Wapenvermeerdering", or "Addition to the Arms". In portrayals of this legend, the emperor is shown with a red beard, since he is supposed to be Emperor Barbarossa.

As Haarlem historians love to point out, Emperor Barbarossa died in 1190 well before the siege of Damietta took place in 1218, so the story shown in the painting is just a Haarlem fantasy of greater knighthood and glory in the Crusades.

During the Hook and Cod wars in the County of Holland in the 15th century, Maximilian I, Holy Roman Emperor supported the bourgeoisie in the cities (Cod) in their fight against the nobility in the countryside (Hook). During these wars Haarlem, like the cities of Dordrecht, Leiden, Amsterdam, and The Hague, loaned large amounts of money to Maximilian I. The emperor granted Haarlem and the other cities the right to use his personal imperial crown in their coat of arms, out of gratitude for these loans. In the coat of arms of Haarlem, the Imperial Crown is positioned on top of the escutcheon.

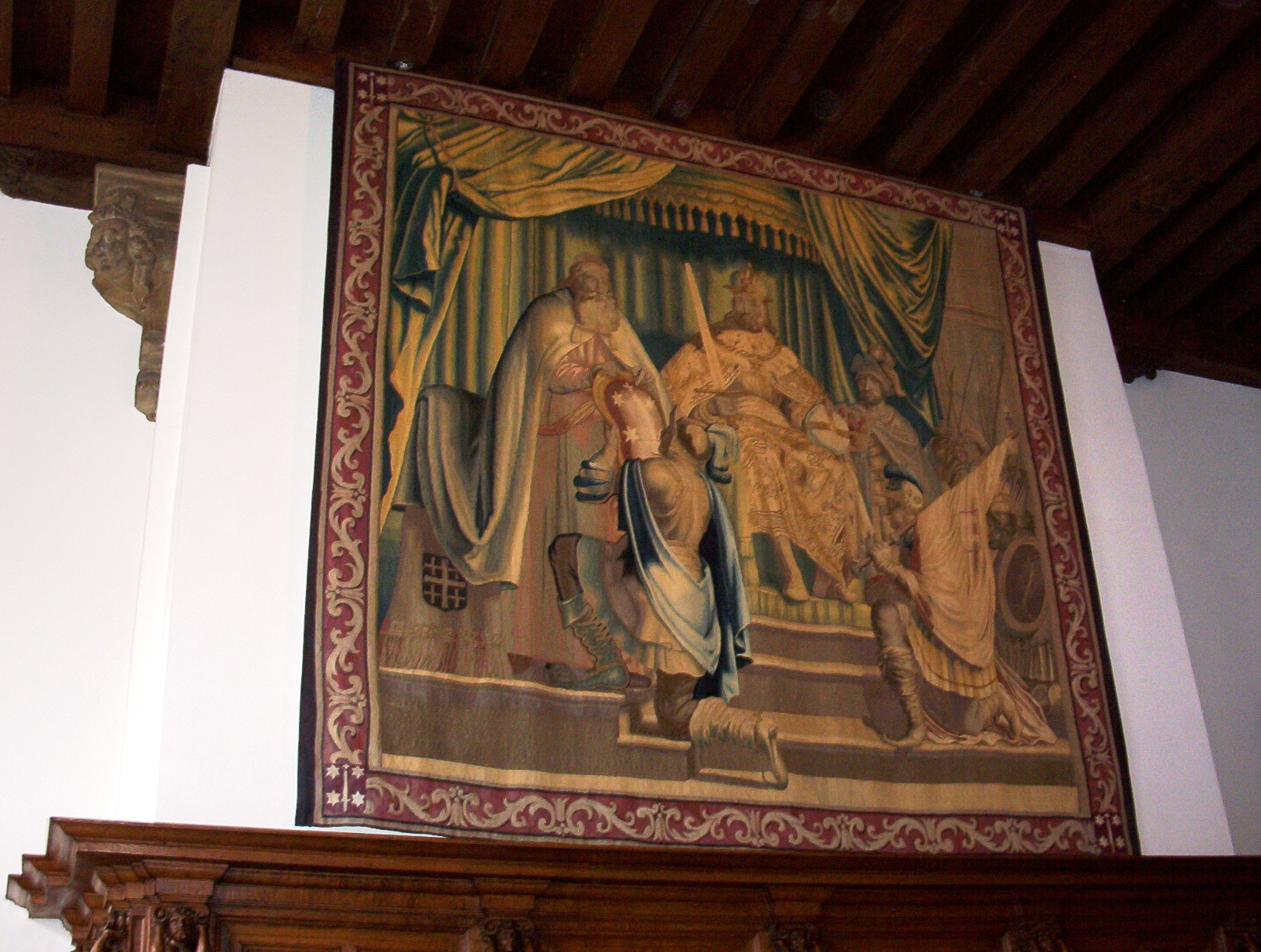
Tapestry ordered at the same time as the painting by De Grebber. This is still installed in the city hall above the mantel in the council chamber

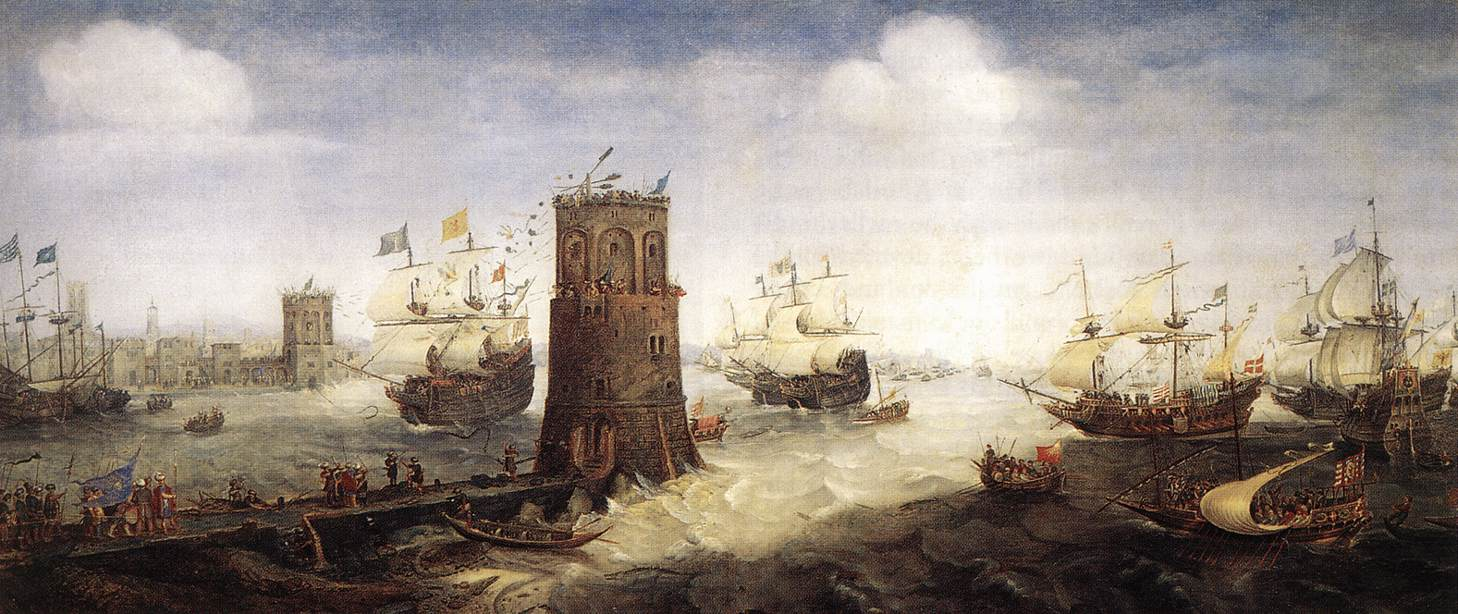
Painting commissioned by the Haarlem council by Cornelis Claesz van Wieringen, 1625-1630. The ship breaks the harbour chain at Damietta, the foremost flag on the "Saw-ship" shows the barren branches of the Haarlem coat of arms.

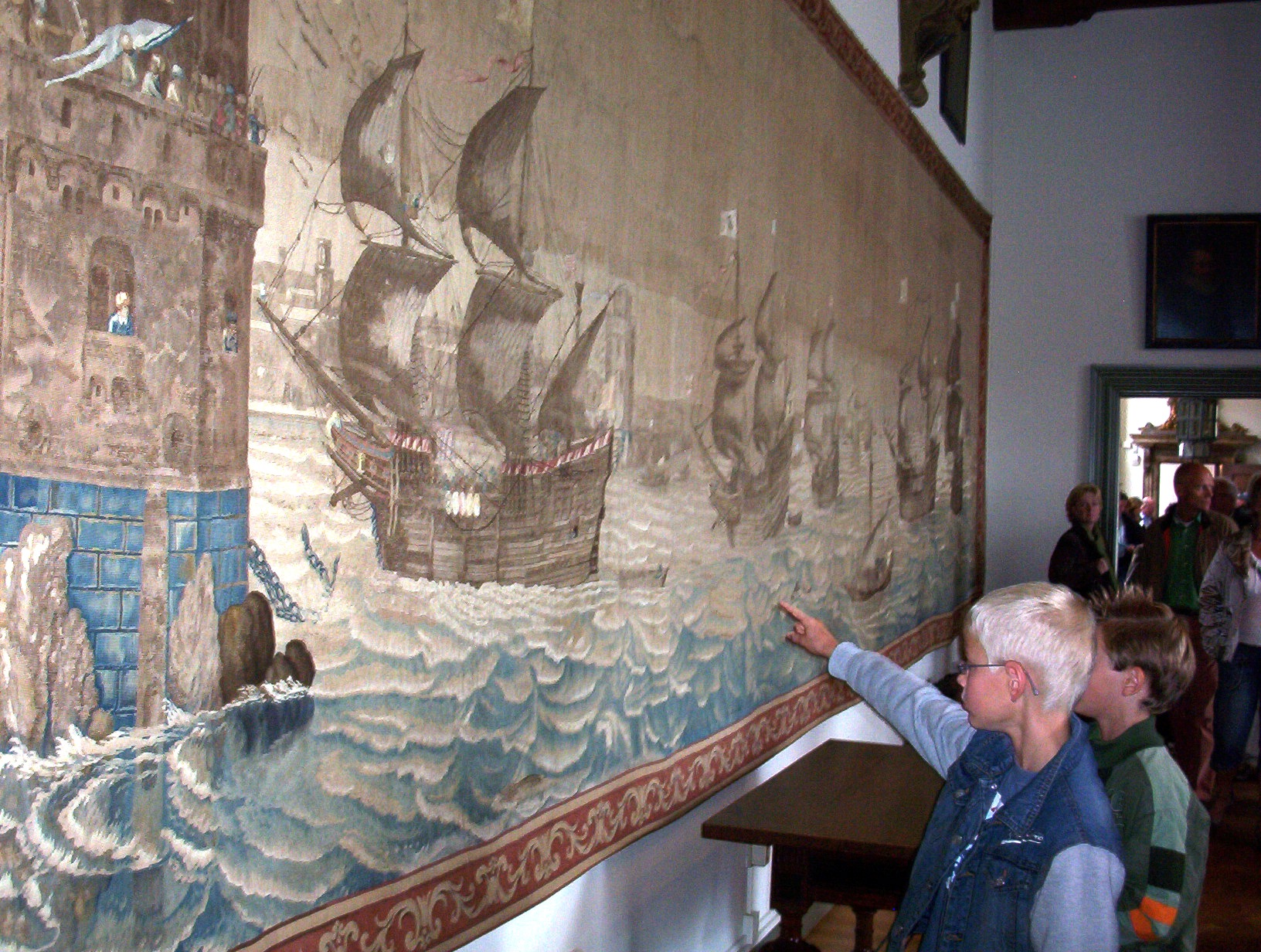
The tapestry ordered at the same time as the painting by Van Wieringen. This is still installed in the city hall on the wall that was built for it (the Lieven de Key wing)

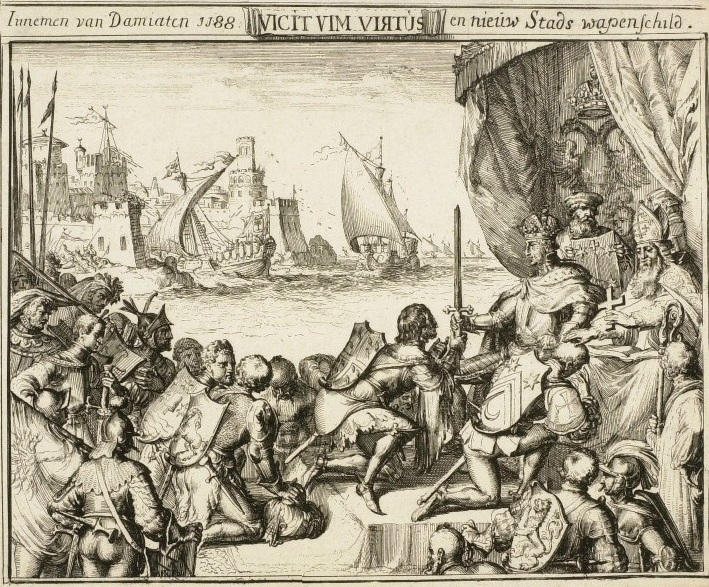
Romeyn de Hooghe engraved this scene in 1688 for the Haarlem city map for 500th anniversary of the capture of Damiate. The "Saw-ship" is in the background and in the foreground the Haarlem knights are awarded the sword and cross attributes in Jerusalem.
