= Elisabeth Gasthuis Poort =

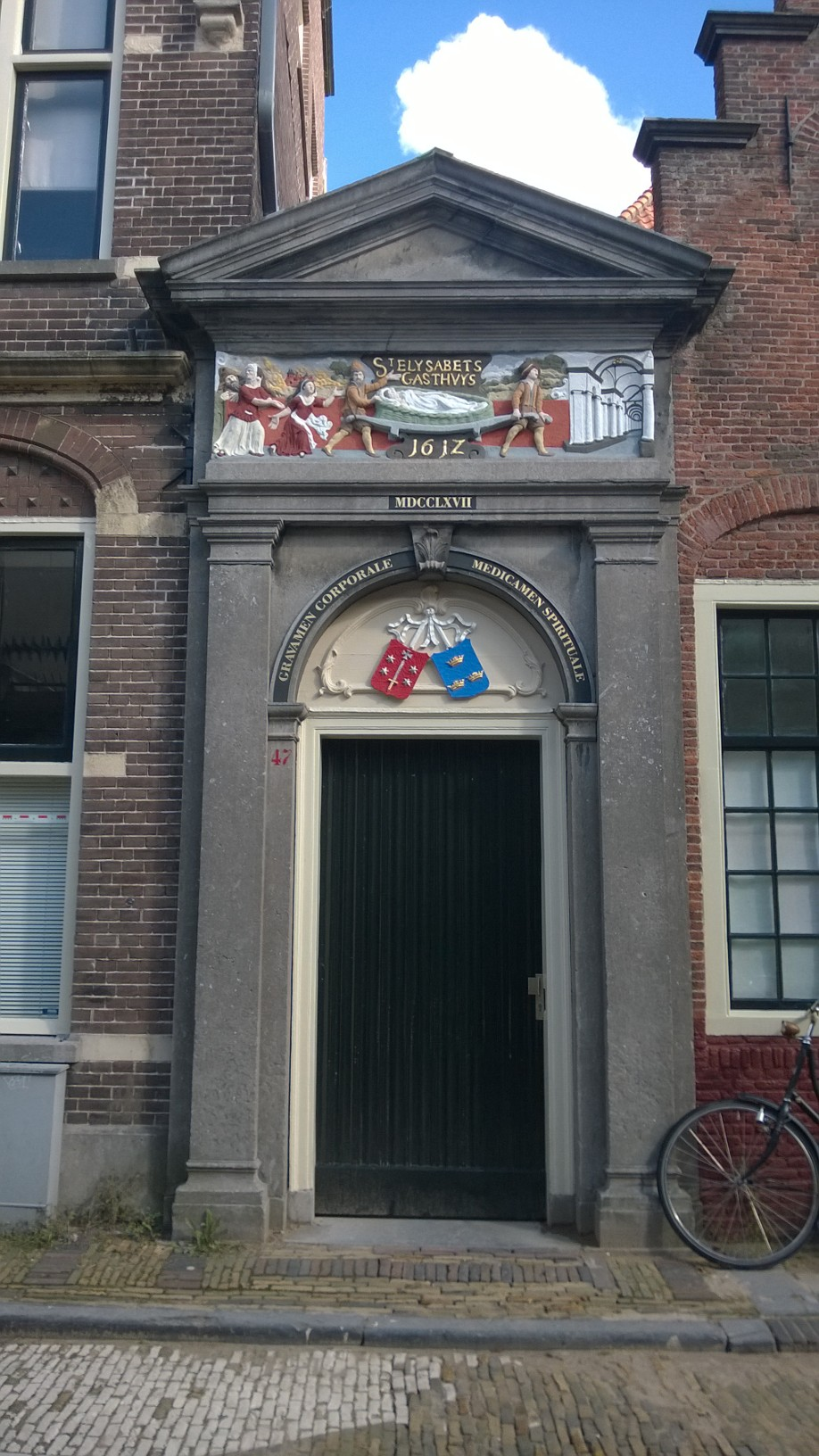
- Groot Heiligland (47/63). The doorway is from 1767 and the gable stone is dated 1612. To the right are the old houses of the original pensioners that were allowed to stay there.

General information
- Type: Doorway
- Address: Groot Heiligland
- Town or city: Haarlem
- Country: Netherlands
- Coordinates: 52°22′36.34″N 4°38′02.29″E
- Completed: 1767
- Designations: National monument

Elisabeth Gasthuis Poort (Dutch: Poortje Elisabetsgasthuis) is the address of a doorway in Haarlem. The neo-classical stone doorway is dated 1767 in roman numerals, and the gable stone set into it from 1612 was repainted in 2017. The entire doorway is part of the Elisabeth Gasthuis complex and has itself been declared one of the national monuments of The Netherlands.

This doorway originally led to the small public garden called the Elisabeth Gasthuis tuin with an entrance to the old regent rooms. Hospital expansion over the centuries has resulted in this doorway now opening onto a large stairwell as part of the larger hospital complex. Today no longer a hospital, the various parts of the old complex are used mostly for educational purposes and residential apartments. There still is a small garden in the middle of the complex however, and another gate still leads to that garden from the other side of the block.

Like other parts of the old St. Elisabeth Gasthuis complex, this door also bears the coat of arms of Haarlem with that of Elizabeth of Hungary (the three crowns). The gable stone tells the history of the hospital. On the left a monk peeks at the viewer, symbolizing one of the monks who were driven away from this place in the 1580s when it was still the minderbroedersklooster. Next on the left are the nuns of the original hospice fleeing the fire of 1576. Behind them you see the fire. Their old St. Elisabeth Gasthuis hospice burned which was located on the Verwulft. They were awarded this land, after the monks were driven away. On the right a glimpse of how the old patient care hall looked. In the middle a reminder of how the bedridden patients were brought in: two men carried them on a type of stretcher that was kept as flat as possible with a special gait that was out of step: you see that the legs of the men are positioned opposite to each other. Such stretchers and the special gait are still used for the Alkmaar cheese market today.

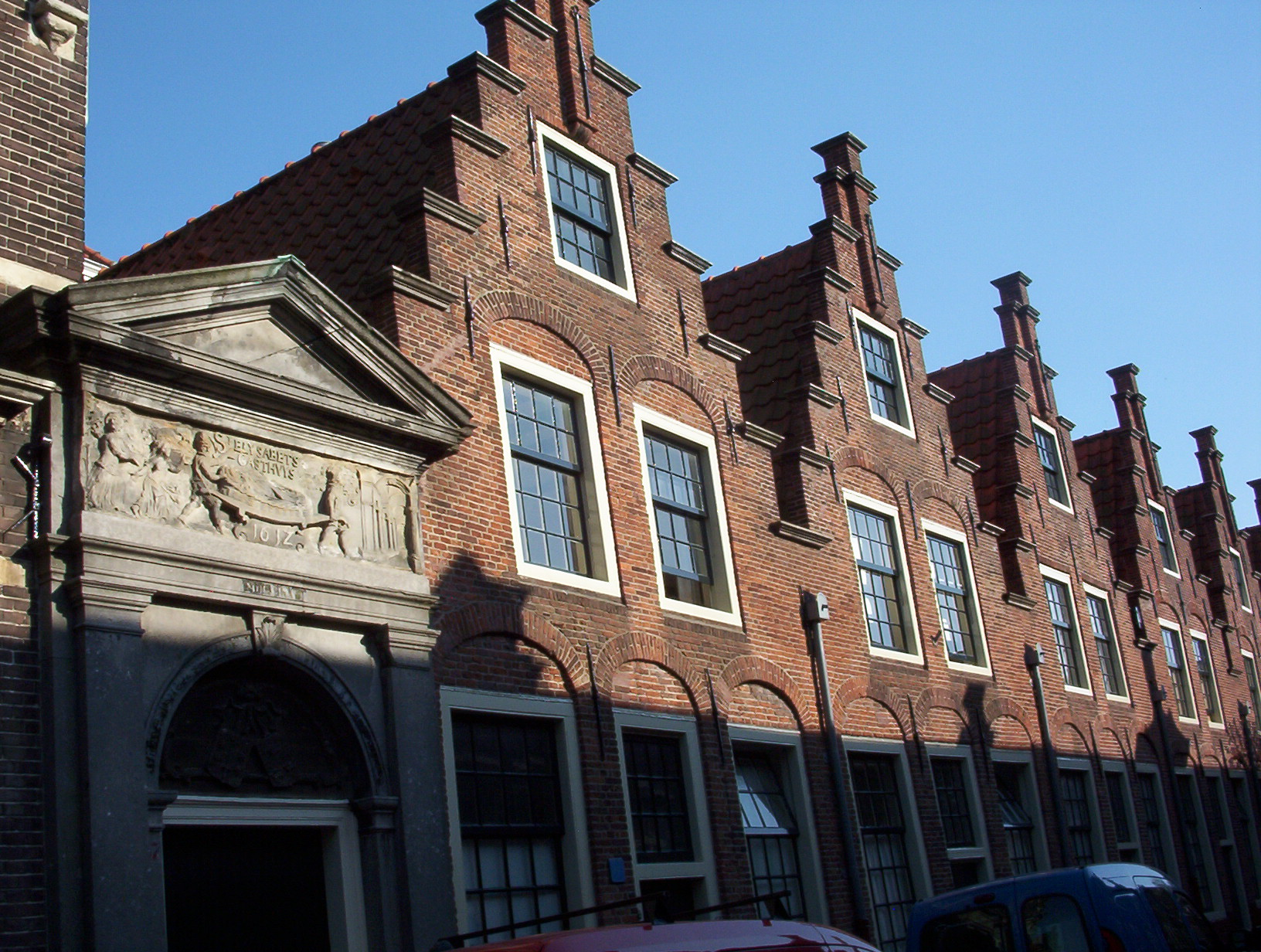
The gable stone before restoration with a view of the houses on the right

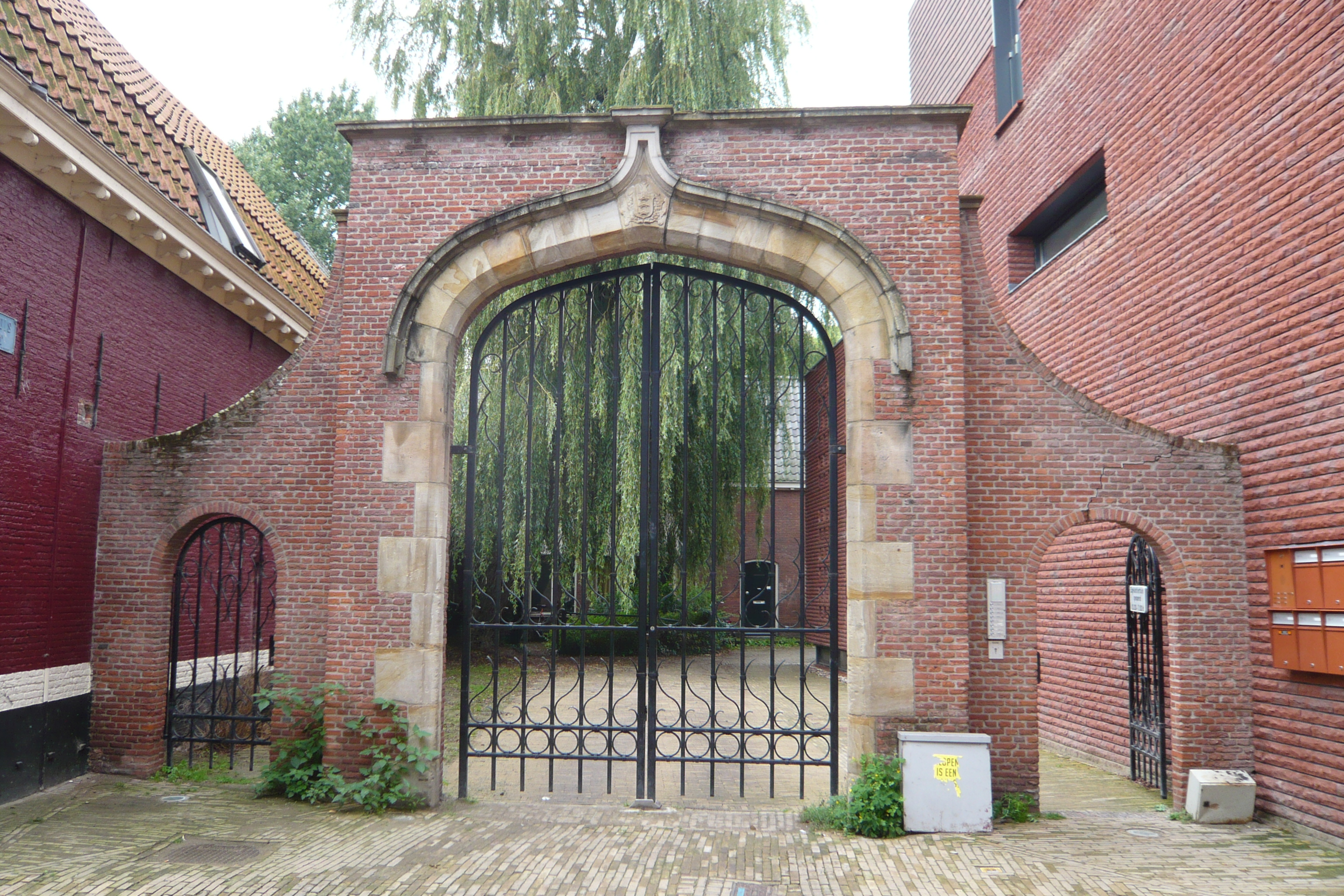
The Tudor-style gateway to the garden from the Kleine Houtstraat

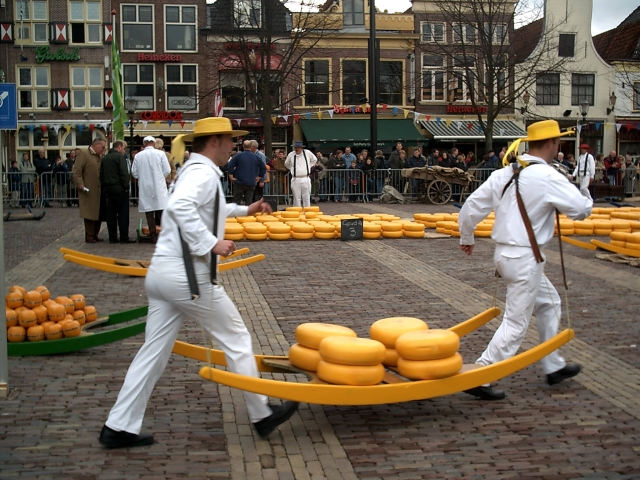
Alkmaar cheese carriers at work "out of step"
