= Pieter Holsteyn I =

Dutch painter

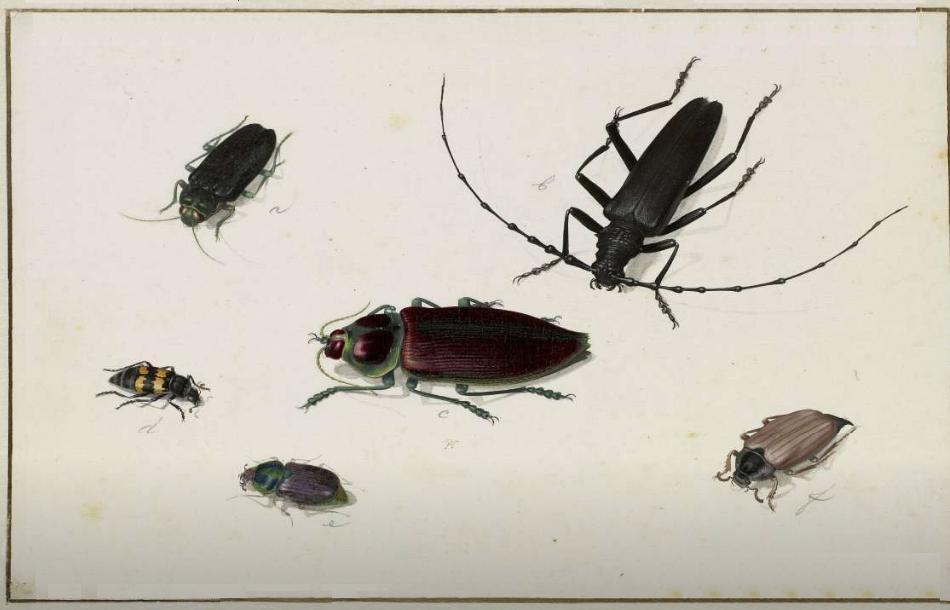
6 beetles, 1600

Pieter Holsteyn (1585–1662) was a Dutch Golden Age painter, engraver and stained glass worker.

== Biography ==
Holsteyn was born and died in Haarlem. According to Houbraken who quotes Samuel Ampzing, "Pet. Holstein" was a good glasspainter who painted the damiaatjes in the Haarlem City Hall council chamber ("vroedschapskamer")". Unfortunately those stained glass windows have not survived, but in the 19th century four stained glass windows by Pieter Holsteyn were purchased from a church in Bloemendaal and restored, and those have been installed in the "Gravenzaal" or main hall of the city hall. One of them illustrates the Damiaatjes legend. Ironically, after restoration activities in the beginning of the last century, the Bloemendaal church wished to buy the windows back, but instead they have had replicas made.

According to the RKD, Holsteyn taught his craft to sons, Cornelis Holsteyn and Pieter Holsteyn the Younger. Besides his work on stained glass windows and engraved portraits, he is also known for painting insects, birds, and other animals. Since his son Pieter also took to painting birds, their works can be hard to tell apart.
