= Cornelis Holsteyn =

Dutch Golden Age painter

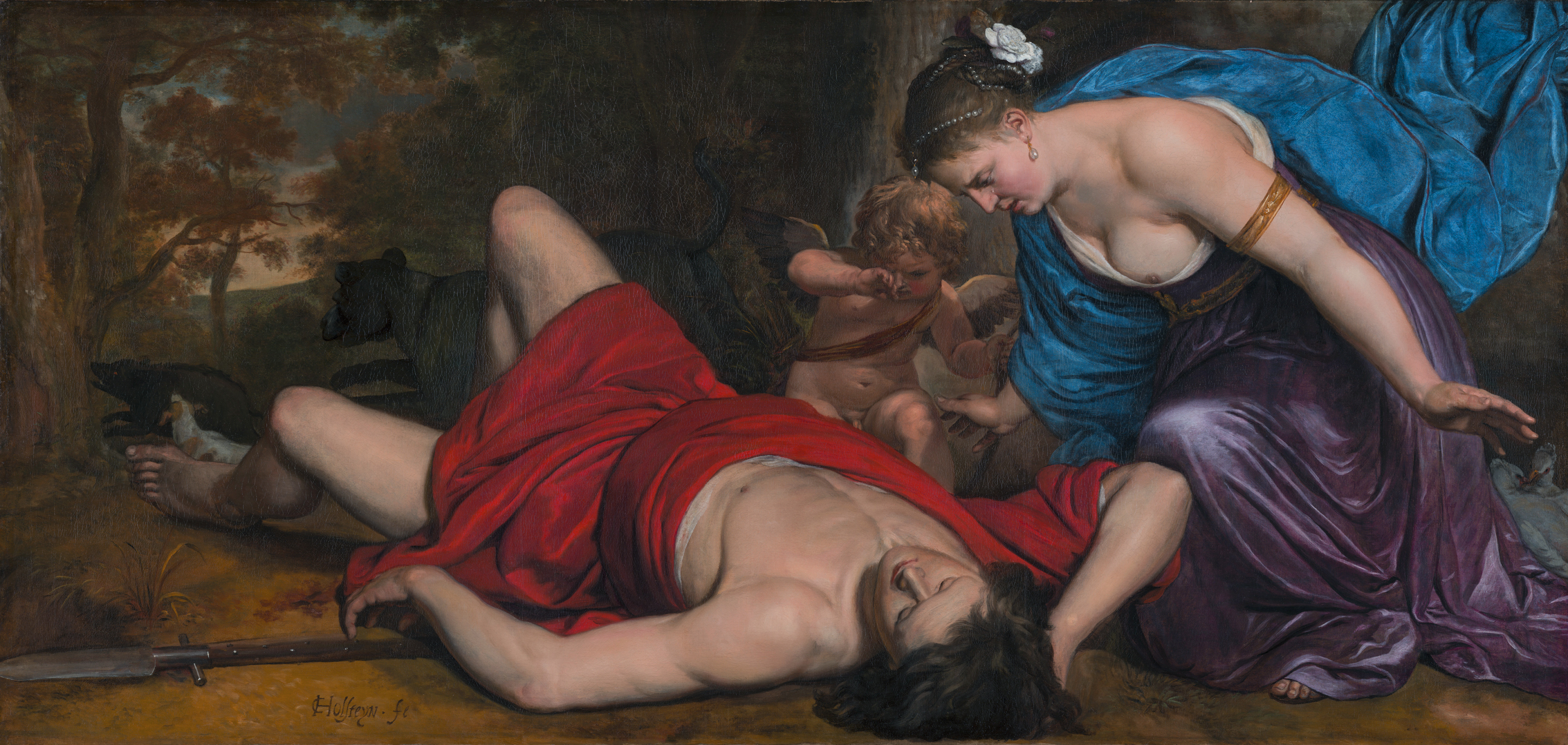
- 'Venus and Cupid lamenting the dead Adonis, 1656.
- Born: Cornelis Holsteyn; 1618; Haarlem
- Died: 1658 (aged 39–40); Amsterdam
- Known for: Painting
- Movement: Baroque

Cornelis Holsteyn (1618 – 2 December 1658) was a Dutch Golden Age painter from Haarlem.

== Biography ==
According to the RKD he was a painter of historical allegories, portraits, and interior decorations, trained by his father Pieter Holsteyn I. According to Houbraken, his father was a glass painter, and thus was trained for glass painting, but the market in glass painting not being what it was, he turned his hand to painting canvas. Houbraken felt he received less for a painting than he deserved, because his work was of a very high quality. He describes a Triumph of Bacchus, and a Lycurgus, which was painted for the Amsterdam Orphanage.

According to the RKD, he moved to Amsterdam with his brother Pieter Holsteyn II in 1647, became poorter there in 1652, and was betrothed there on Christmas Eve, 1654. He was buried in the Nieuwe Kerk on December 2, 1658, from his home on the Rozengracht. Houbraken claimed he had been fit until his sudden death by Hartvang, or heart-attack.
