= Cornelis Claesz van Wieringen =

Dutch Golden Age painter (c. 1576–1633)

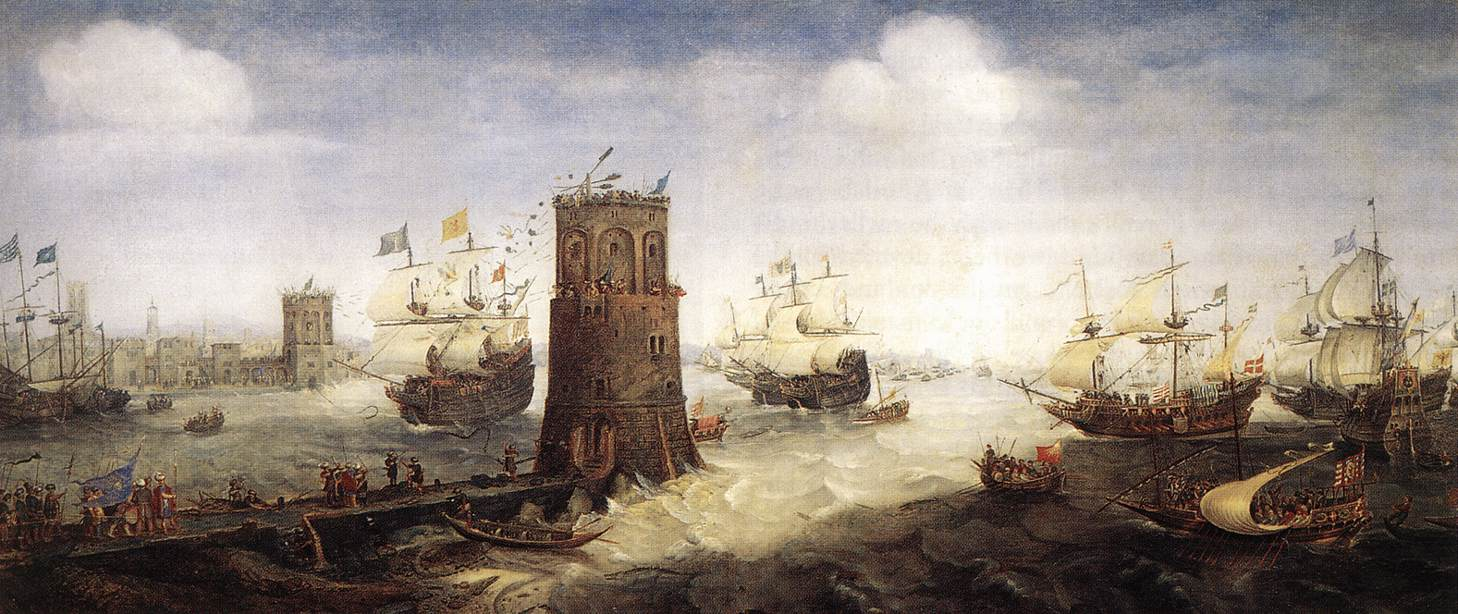
A Haarlem ship cuts the chain of the port of Damietta. This legend was popular for centuries in Haarlem.

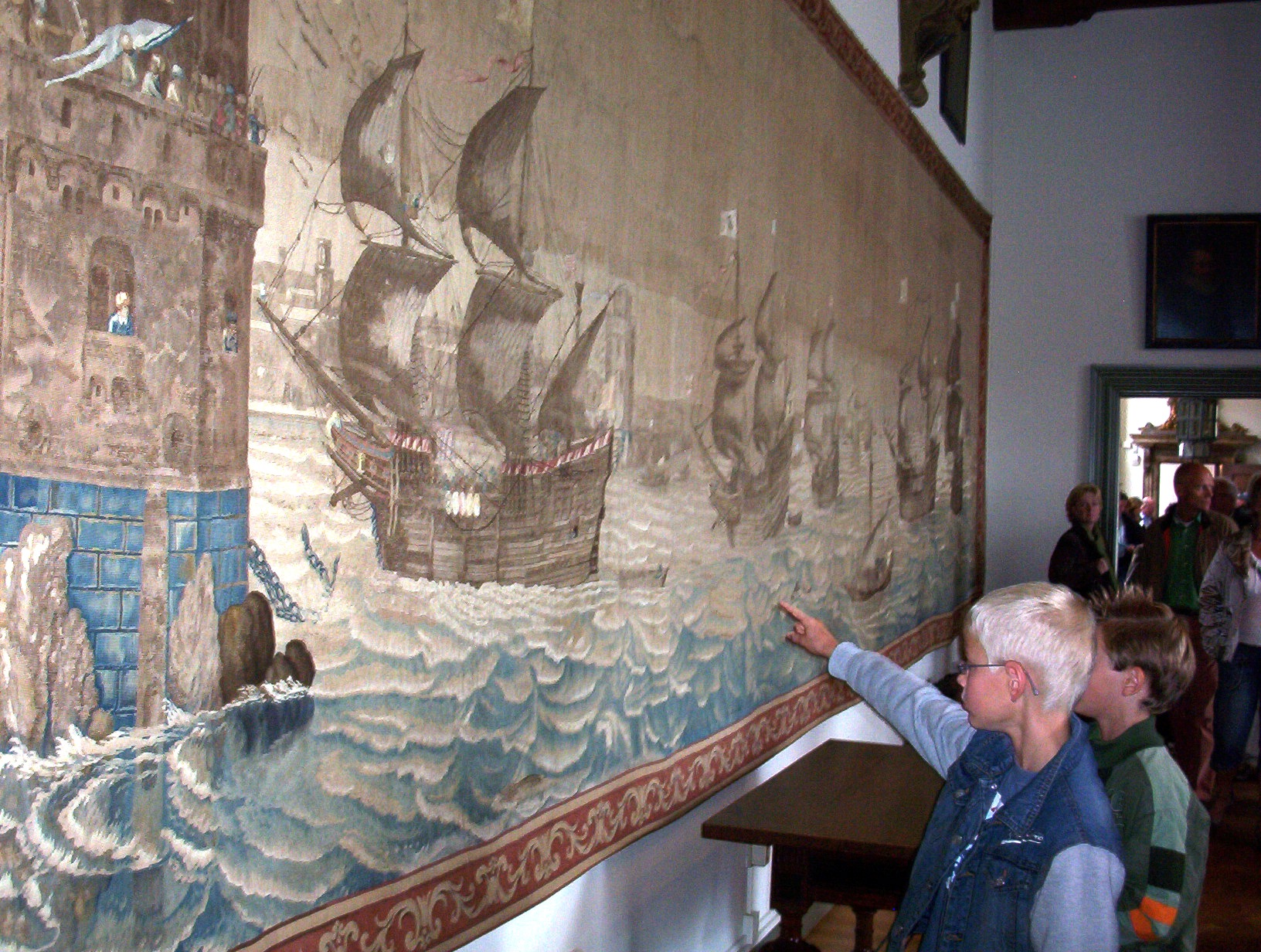
Same subject designed by van Wieringen again as a tapestry in 1629. It is the largest tapestry made in the 17th century and has charmed Haarlem children for centuries.

Cornelis Claesz van Wieringen (c. 1576 – 29 December 1633) was a Dutch Golden Age painter.

== Biography ==
Van Wieringen was born and died in Haarlem. He was the son of a Haarlem captain, and drew, painted and etched with his friends Hendrick Goltzius and Cornelis van Haarlem. He also held important positions in the Haarlem Guild of St. Luke, the painters' guild, where he became a member in 1597.

He specialized in paintings depicting ships and sea battles, and received orders from the municipal councils of Haarlem and Amsterdam. He painted the most popular picture of the Damiaatjes legend of Haarlem, showing how a Haarlem ship broke the protective chain at Domyat, Egypt during the Fifth Crusade, resulting in an important victory over Islam. This painting was such a success that it was reordered in tapestry form, and both pieces are in the collection of the Frans Hals Museum.

The city of Haarlem archives still hold the original records of the 1629 order to Van Wieringen to make the tapestry, the largest made in the 17th century (10.75 meters long and 2.40 meters high). This tapestry still hangs on the wall of the Haarlem City Hall council meeting room known as the vroedschapskamer, where it was installed. It is on public display once a year on Monument Day.

== See also ==
- Haarlem School of painting
