= Damiaatjes =

The coat of arms of Haarlem with the "Damiaatjes" hanging from the barren branches of the Haarlemmerhout.

The Damiaatjes (English: Little Damiettas) refer to two bells in the St. Bavochurch of Haarlem that ring every night between nine and nine thirty, to signal the closing of the city's gates and commemorate the conquest of the Egyptian city Damietta during the Siege of Damietta (1218). Though Haarlem no longer has a wall around the city, or gates to close, the bells are still rung every evening. Damietta is also mentioned during the Fifth Crusade in 1218/1219, and again during the Seventh Crusade in the year 1249. The Haarlem story claims that Haarlem knights and innovative shipbuilders played an important role in the fall of Damietta. Access to the city via the Nile was closed with a large, heavy harbor chain. A Haarlem ship with a saw on the bow (in Dutch called the "zaagschip") was equipped with an iron saw fastened along the bow and front keel. This ship sawed through the Damietta harbour chain and allowed the fleet to attack the city, which was a success. The Damietta story is however contradicted by the eyewitness account of Oliver of Cologne, who led the Dutch fleet, and who never mentioned the heroic actions of the Haarlem knights.

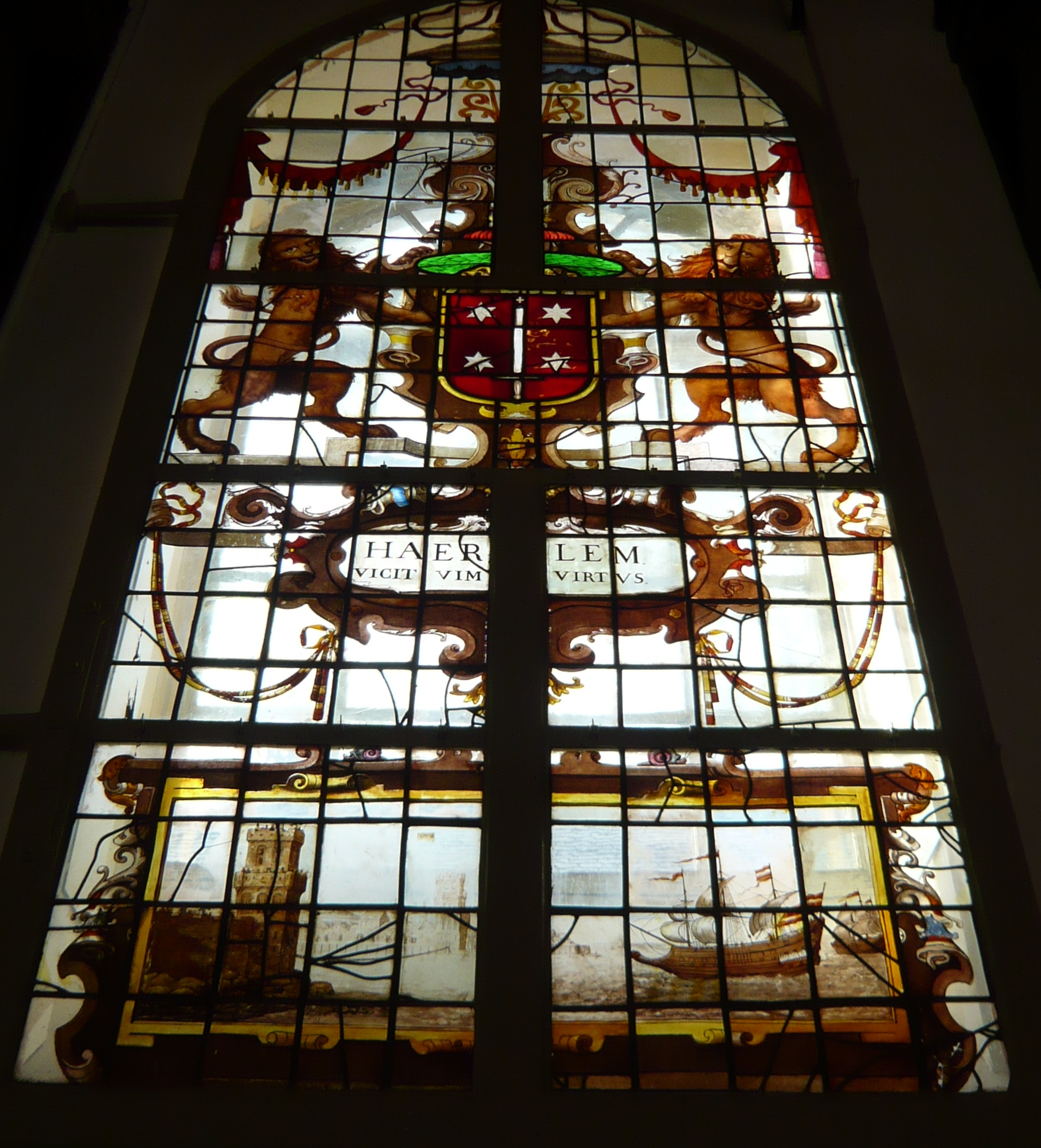
Story in stained glass by Pieter Holsteyn I for a church in Bloemendaal

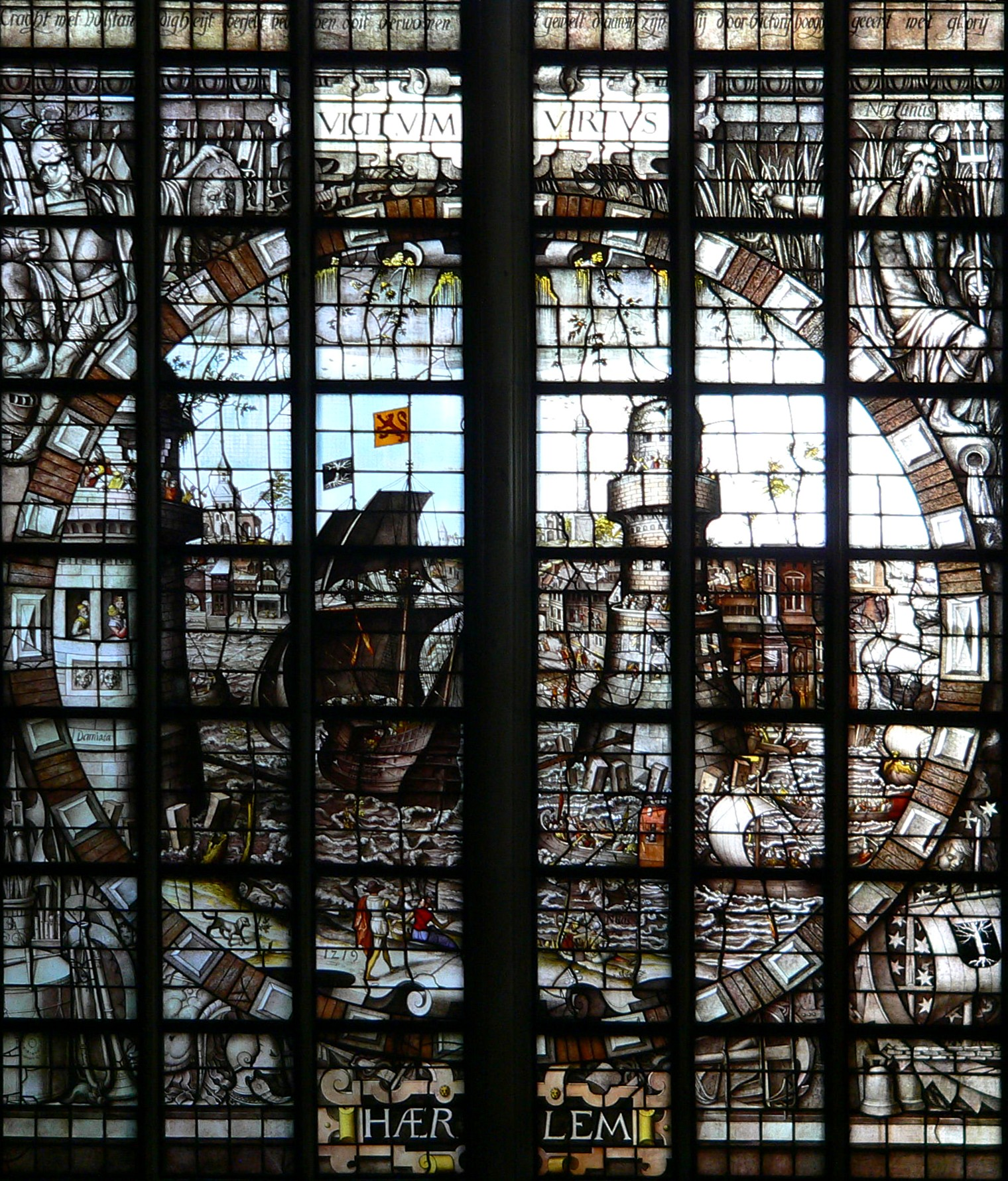
Same theme by Willem Thibaut for the St. John's church in Gouda

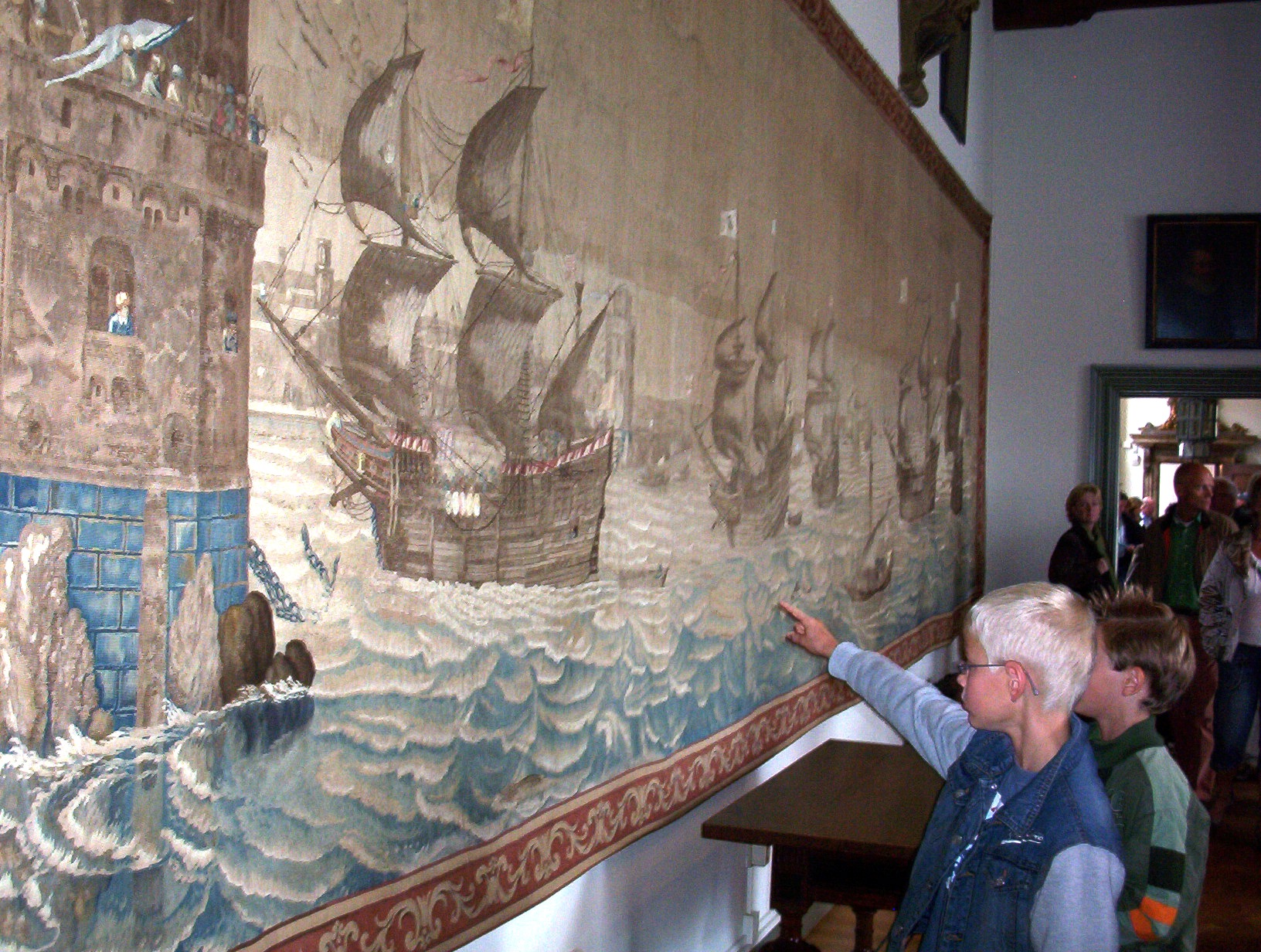
Tapestry illustrating the story in the Haarlem City Hall by Cornelis Claesz van Wieringen

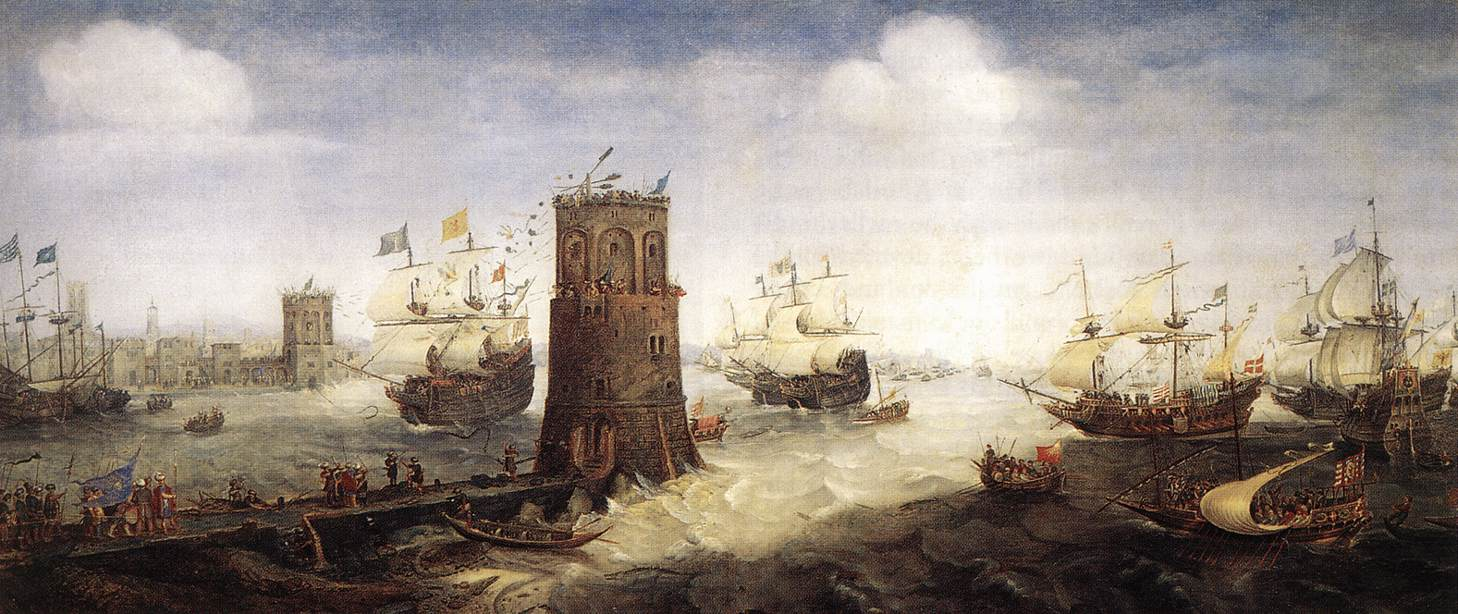
Same theme by Van Wieringen for the Haarlem civic guard (today in the Frans Hals Museum)

The story gained in popularity after 1667 when the Dutch fleet broke another chain to win an important naval victory. Haarlem declared itself the inspiration for this deed.
