= Haarlem City Hall =

Seat of government in Haarlem, Netherlands

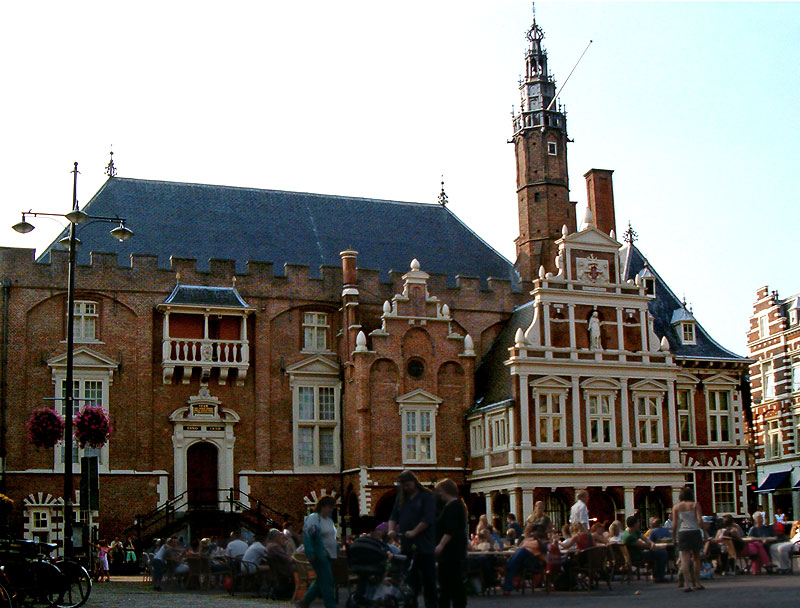
- City Hall of Haarlem
- Interactive map of the Haarlem City Hall area
- Alternative names: Stadhuis Haarlem

General information
- Type: Seat of local government
- Location: Haarlem, Netherlands, Grote Markt
- Coordinates: 52°22′53″N 4°38′05″E
- Completed: 14th century (main hall), 17th century (north wing)
- Owner: City of Haarlem

Design and construction
- Architects: Lieven de Key and others

The City Hall in Haarlem is the seat of the city's government. It was built in the 14th century replacing the Count's castle.

== History ==
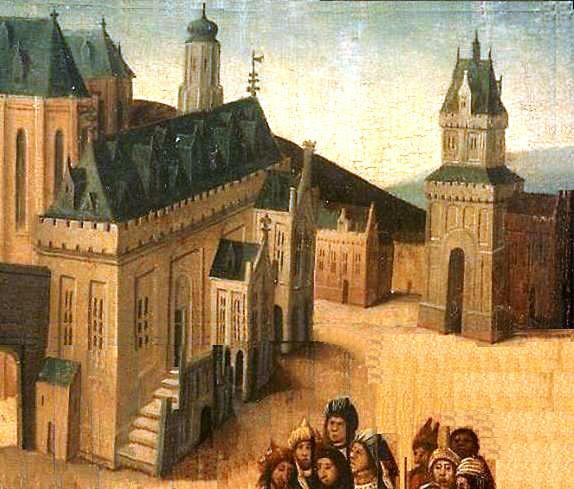
City Hall of Haarlem, detail from 1460 painting by the Master of Bellaert.

A wooden structure was erected on the site of the current Gravenzaal of the City Hall around 1100. In 1955, remnants of this structure were discovered.

After large fires in 1347 and 1351, William I, Duke of Bavaria who was also the Count of Holland at that time, donated the remains of the Gravenzaal to the city's municipality. A new building was built there. The central square building dates from the Middle Ages, but the distinctive façade of the building was designed by architect Lieven de Key and built from 1602-1604. The way it originally looked can be seen in a painting from 1460 by the Master of Bellaert. Originally the city hall was just the front of the building, and the rear cloister belonged to the Dominican brotherhood. After the Protestant Reformation this came into the possession of the city council and it is now a large complex with offices and meeting rooms. Both the Frans Hals Museum and the Haarlem Public Library originally were located in the city hall.

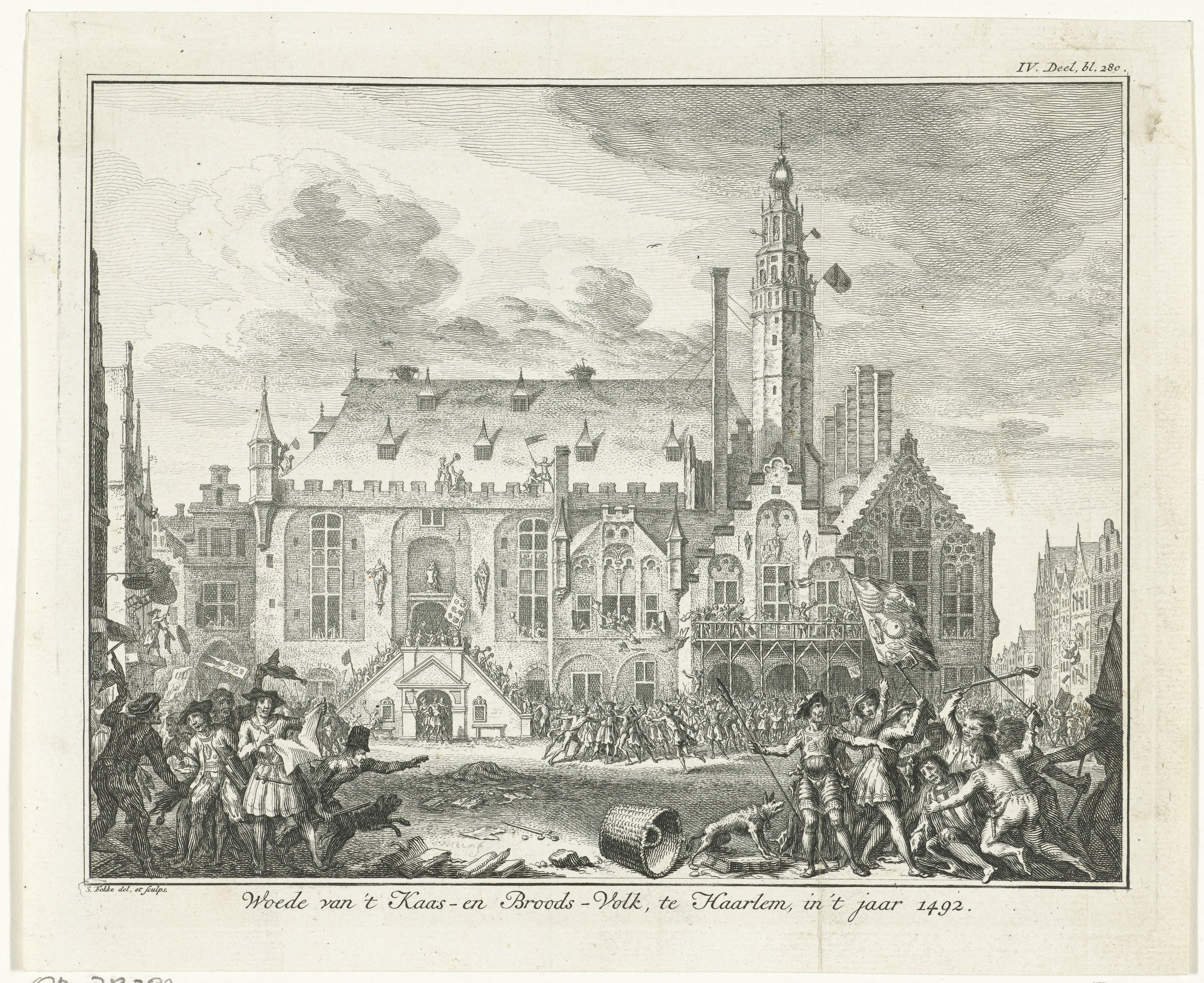
This 1750 "historic" engraving of an uprising in 1492 shows the tower which was torn down in 1672, the old stairs that were redesigned in 1730, and the balcony in front of the "Vierschaar" which was torn down in 1855.

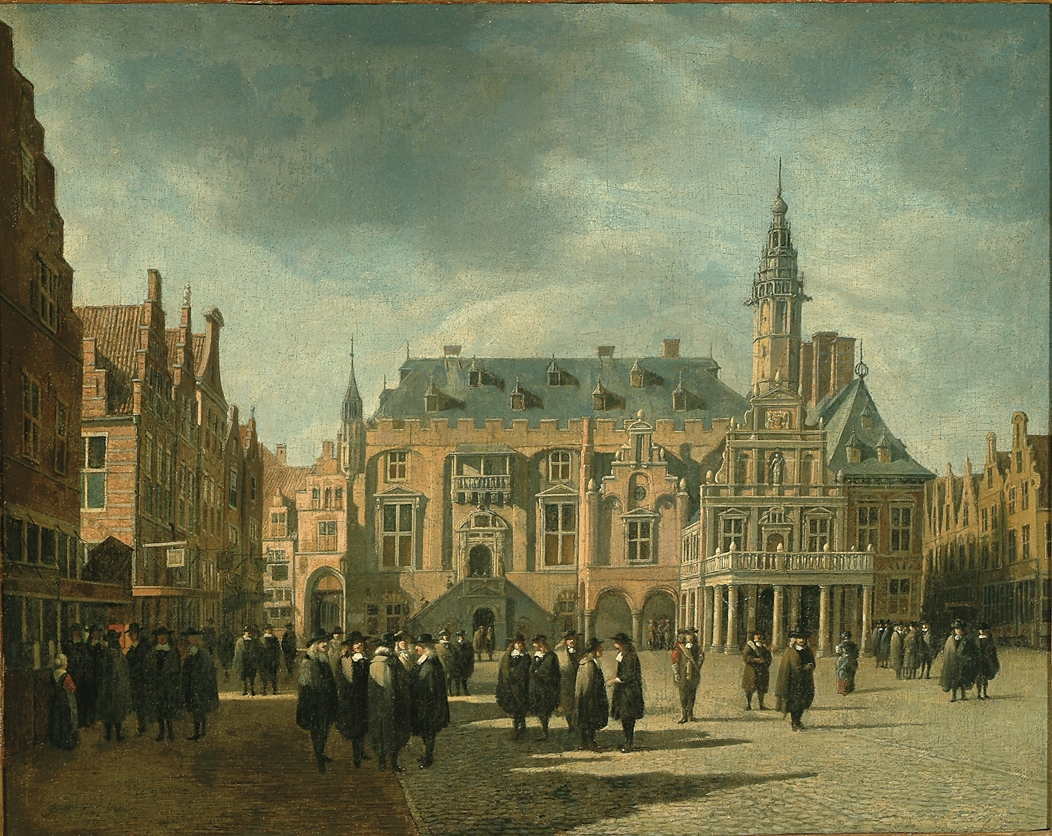
This painting by Gerrit Adriaensz Berckheyde in 1671 shows the 17th-century situation that the 18th century engraving was based on.

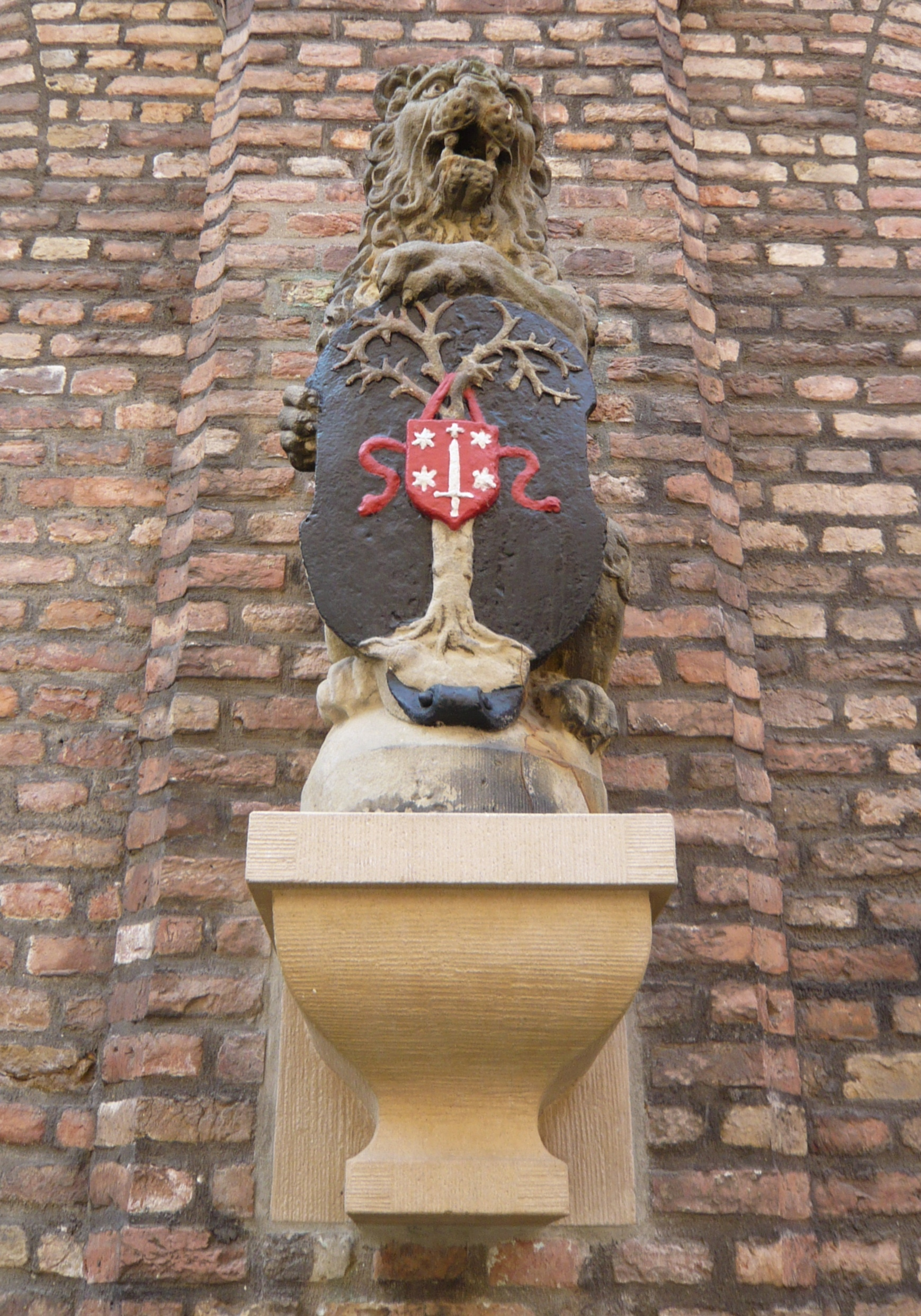
This lion used to be on the staircase and is visible in Gerrit Adriaensz Berckheyde painting of 1671

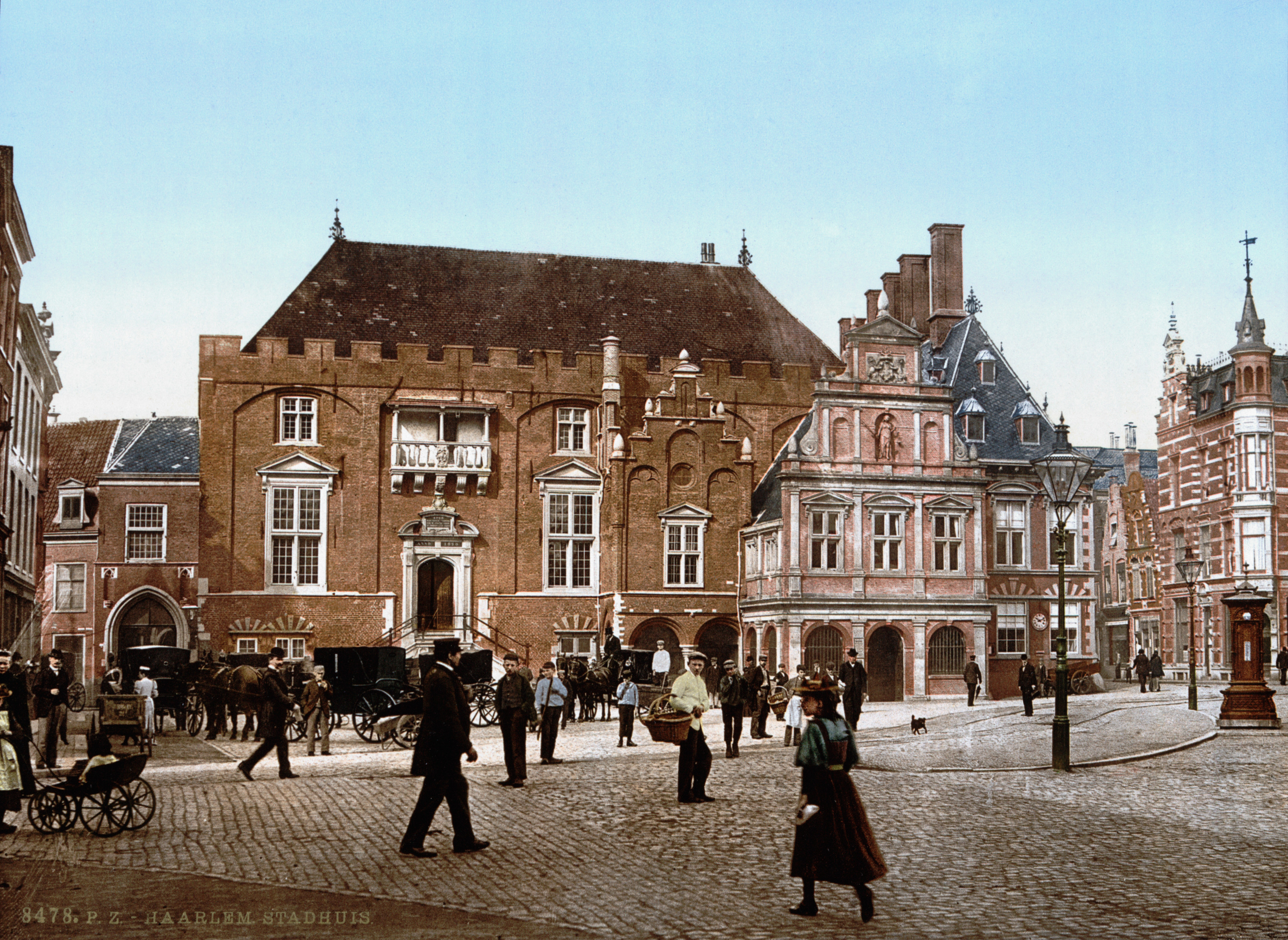
In this photograph from c.1900 the tower is gone, the stairs have their railing, the balcony is gone, and on the right a large clock can be seen that served until after WWII.

The town hall is still used for civic weddings and nearly every Friday in Spring, brides can be seen entering and leaving by the main stairway. All year on Saturdays and Mondays there is a big market in front of the City Hall, where on Saturdays mainly flowers, household goods, and food is sold, though on Mondays the products are mainly cloth, sewing accessories and clothing. Although the market is frequented by the local population, it is also a tourist attraction and worth a visit, if only to try the raw herring from the fish stand, or stroopwafels from the stroopwafel stand. The town hall is also still used for state visits, most recently when the King and Queen paid a visit to Haarlem on 14 June 2013. They heard the local choir Zang en Vriendschap sing and received a book about all the previous royal state visits to Haarlem.

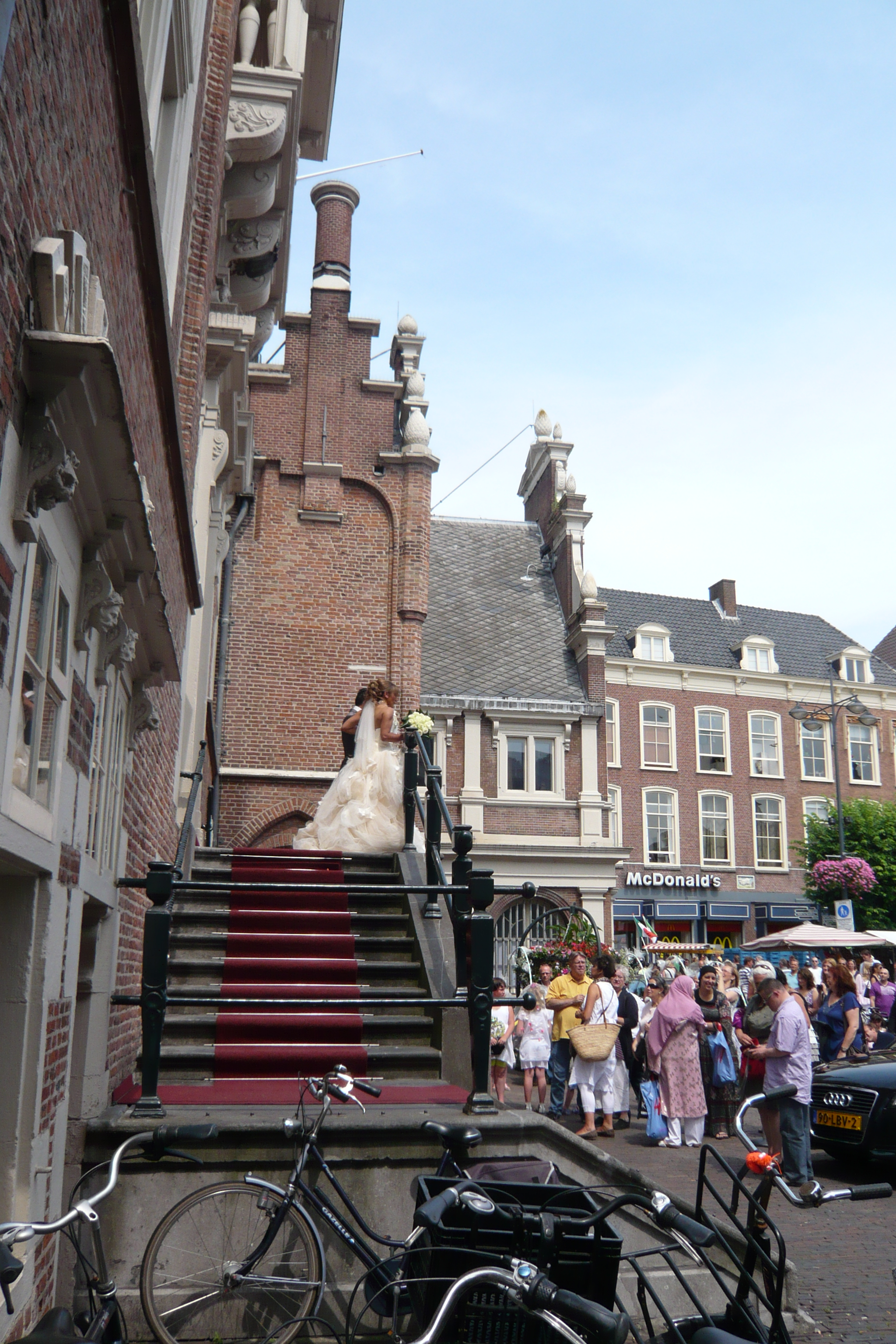
The city hall is traditionally the place where residents have their civic wedding ceremony.

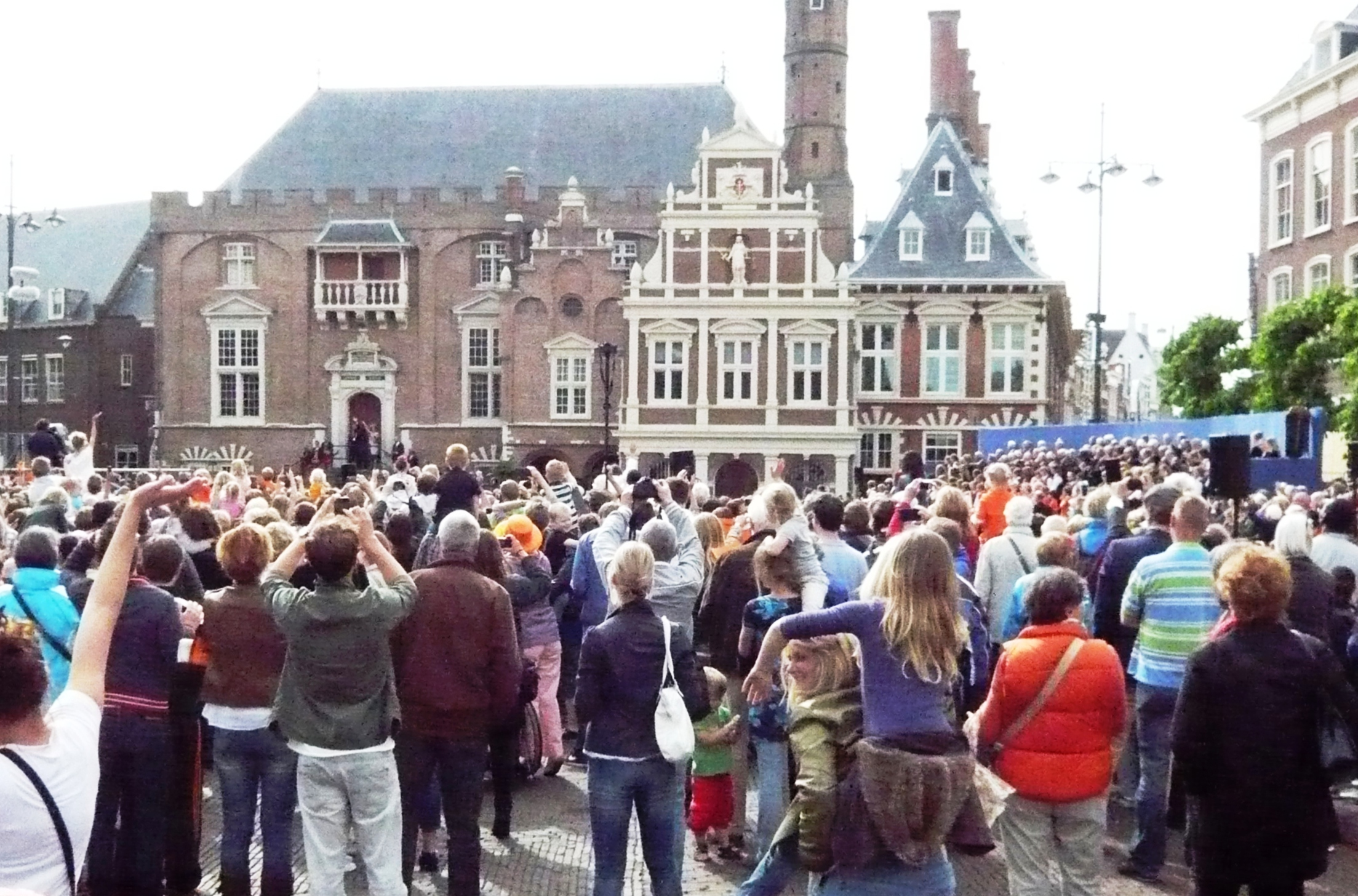
Haarlem waves back at Queen Maxima, 14 June 2013

The town hall was traditionally a gathering place for various gentlemen, and the Dutch Society of Science started meeting there in 1752, which was the beginning of a municipal museum for natural history, that today no longer exists, though its "competitor" founded in 1781 still does; namely the Teylers Museum. When they moved out, the paintings stayed and they became the Haarlem municipal museum, which moved out in 1913 to become the Frans Hals museum.

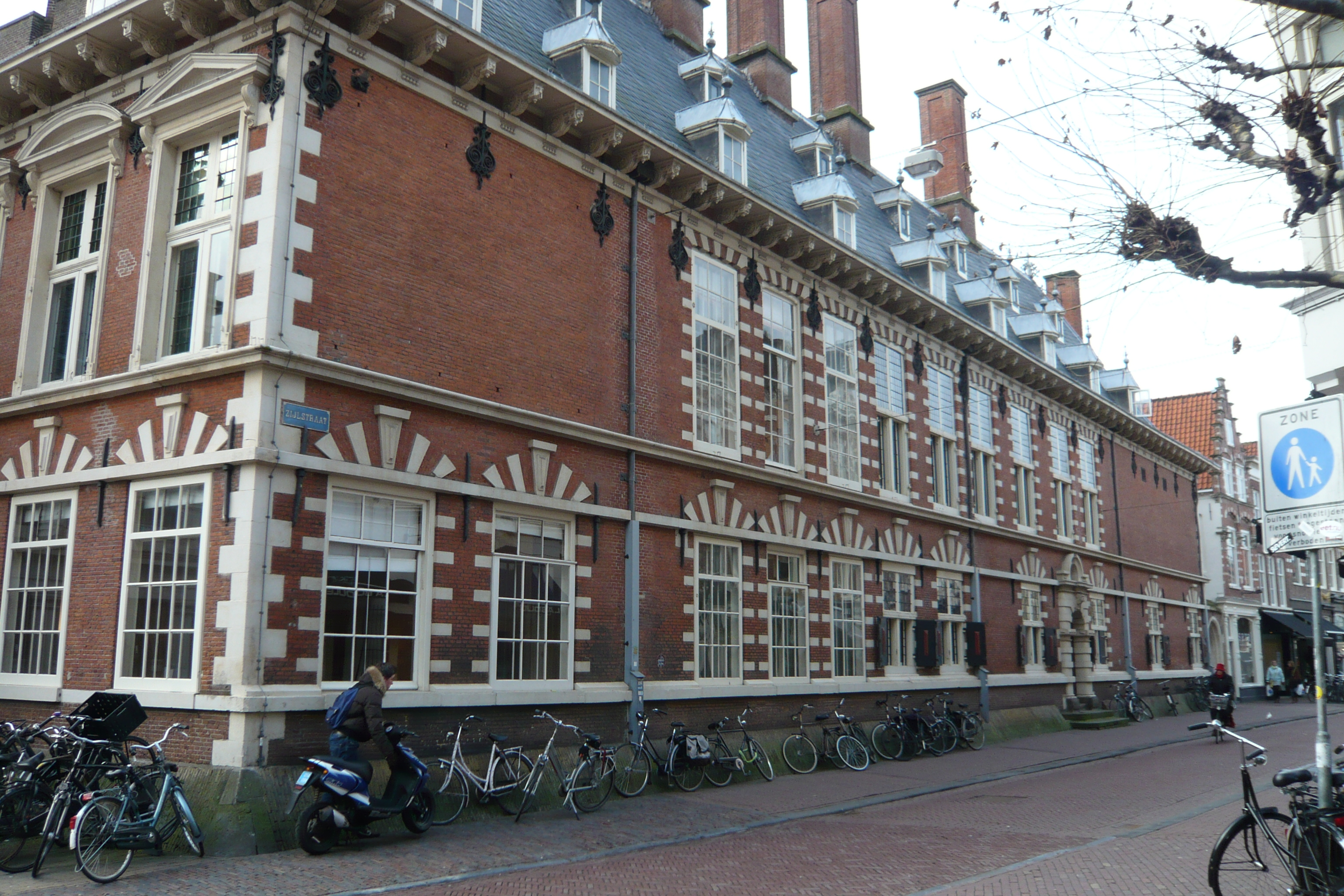
Wing designed by Lieve de Key in the Zijlstraat.

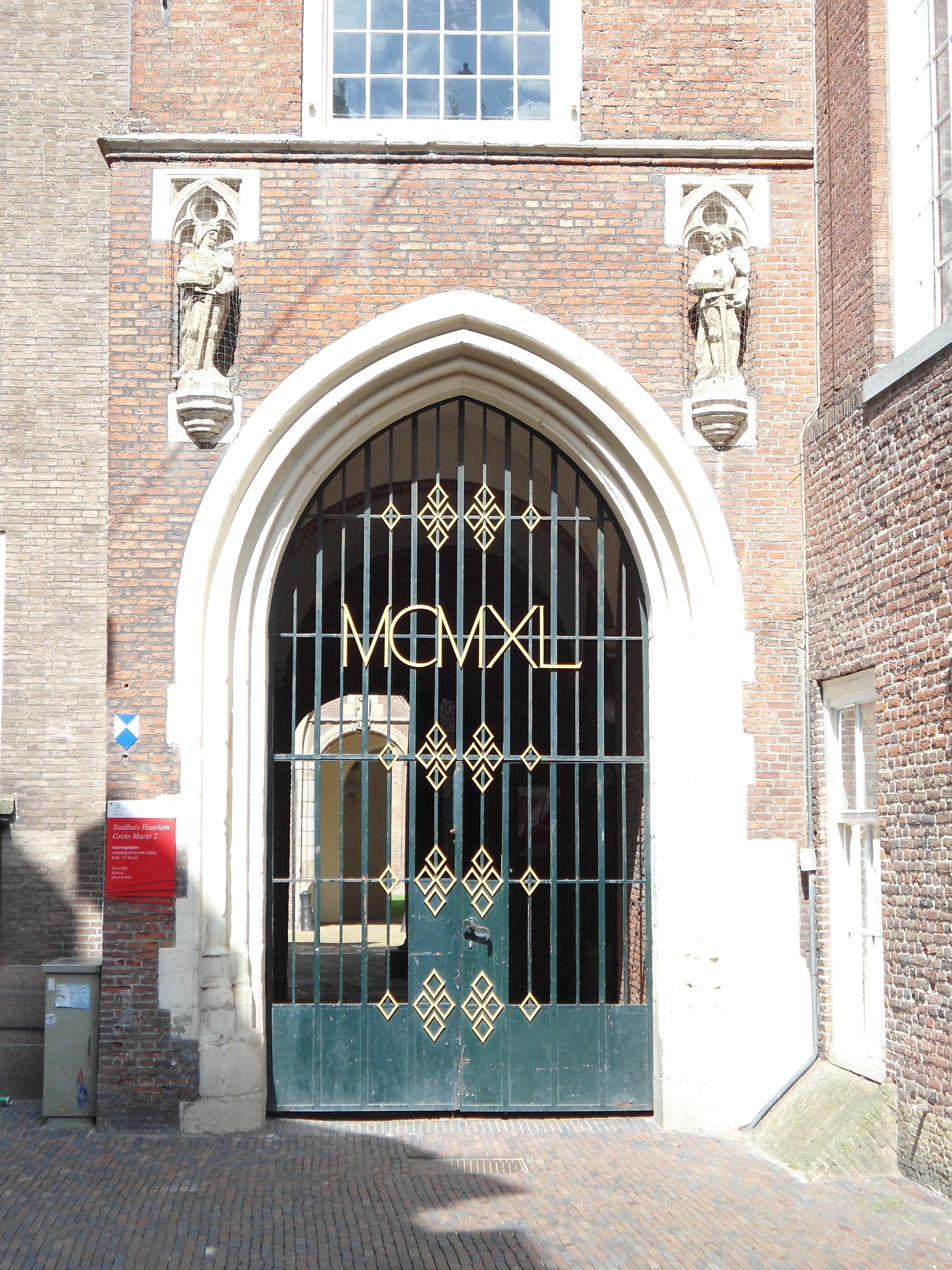
"Pandpoort", main entrance during opening hours.

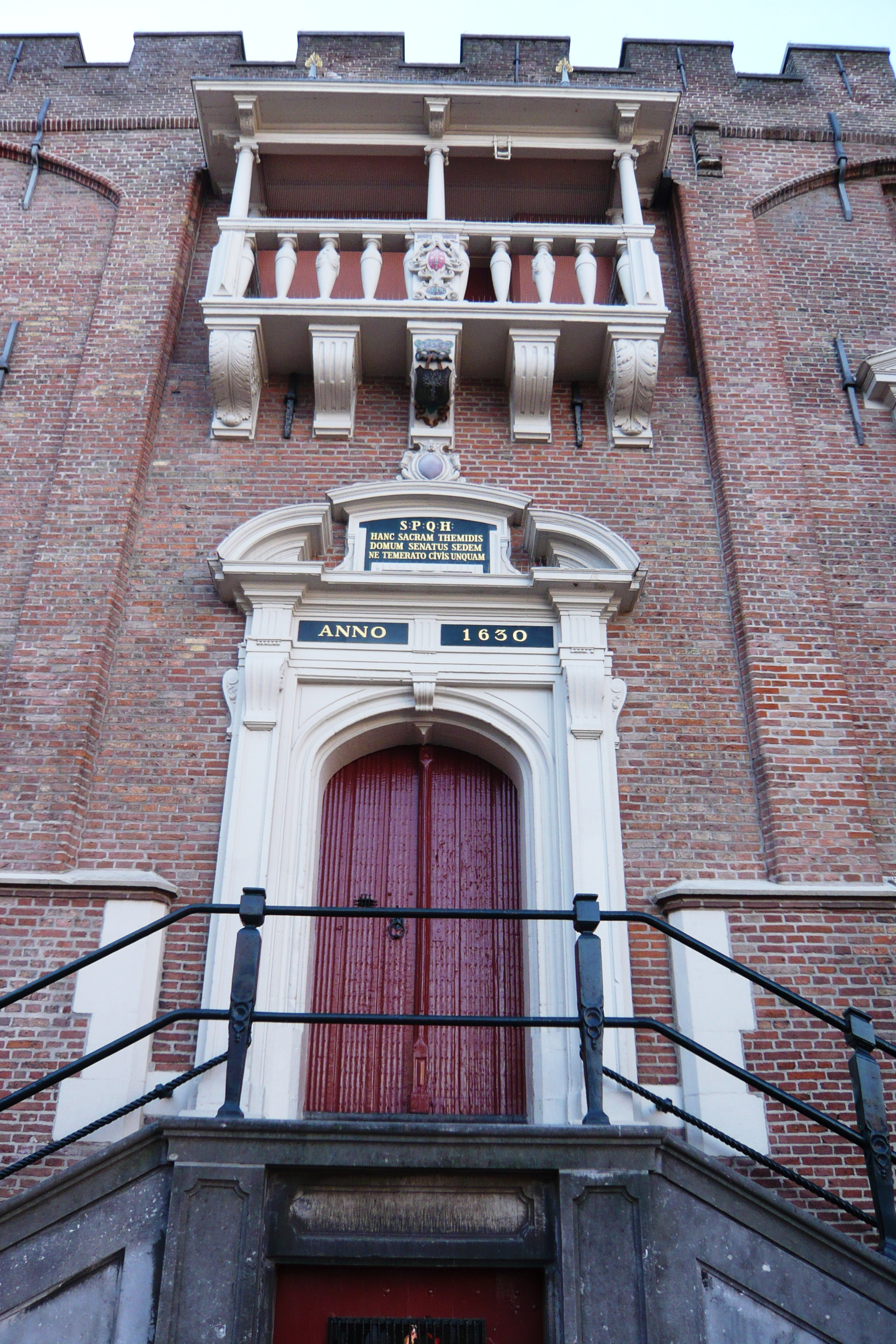
Door and balcony designed by Salomon de Bray in 1630

== Inside ==
A large number of paintings and objects from Haarlem's rich history can be found inside the building. One series of paintings depict the various counts of Holland, starting from Dirk I to Maximilian from Austria. In the Middle Ages these paintings were hanging in the Carmelieten Cloister in Haarlem; they were painted between 1486 and 1491. In 1570 it is mentioned in city archives that the paintings were hanging in the City Hall; possibly they were moved there in 1566 to protect them from the iconoclastic riots. Other paintings and objects are either part of the original interior, or too big to fit in the Frans Hals Museum.

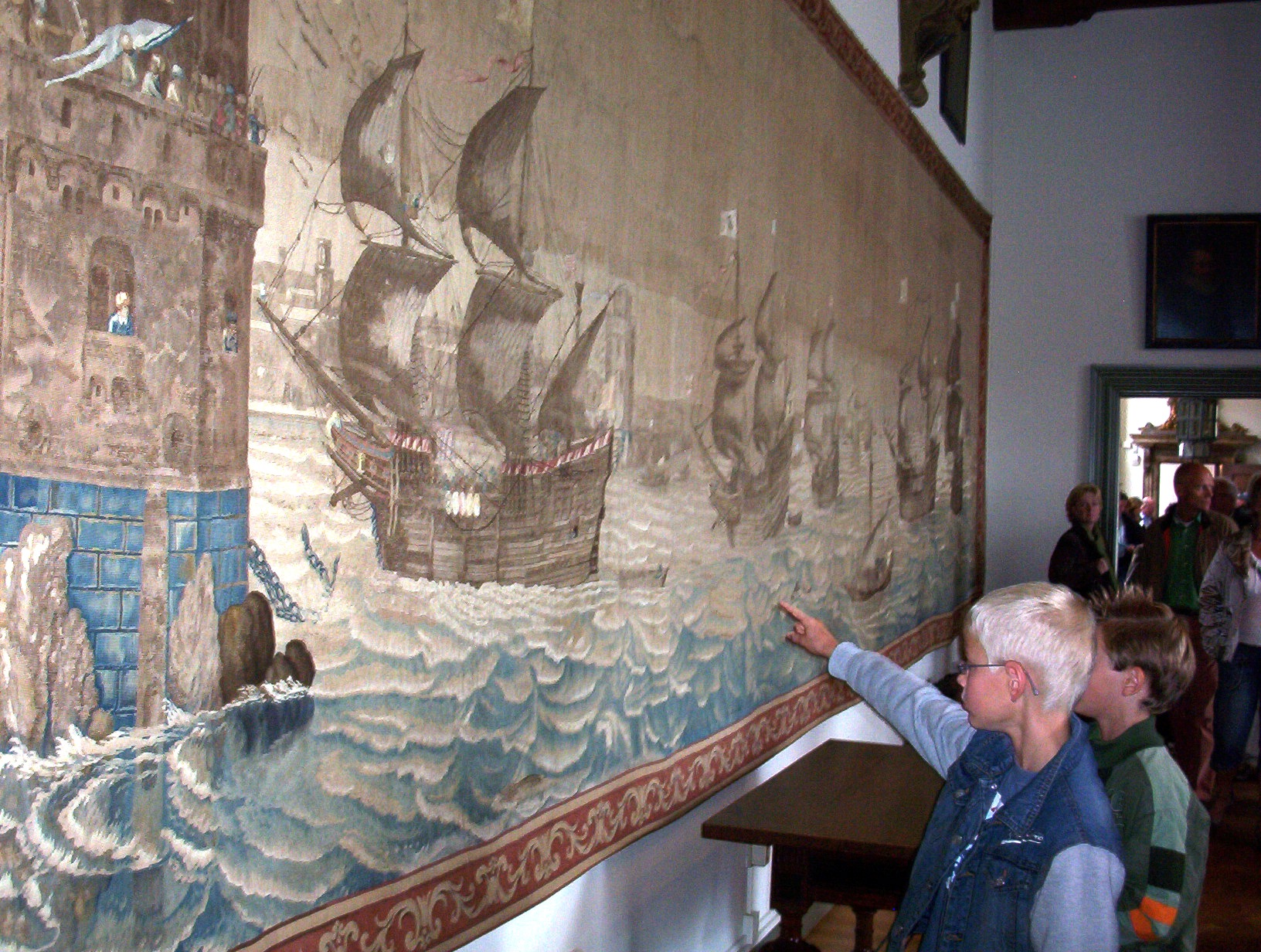
Wall tapestry of Haarlem crusade Damiaatjes legend.

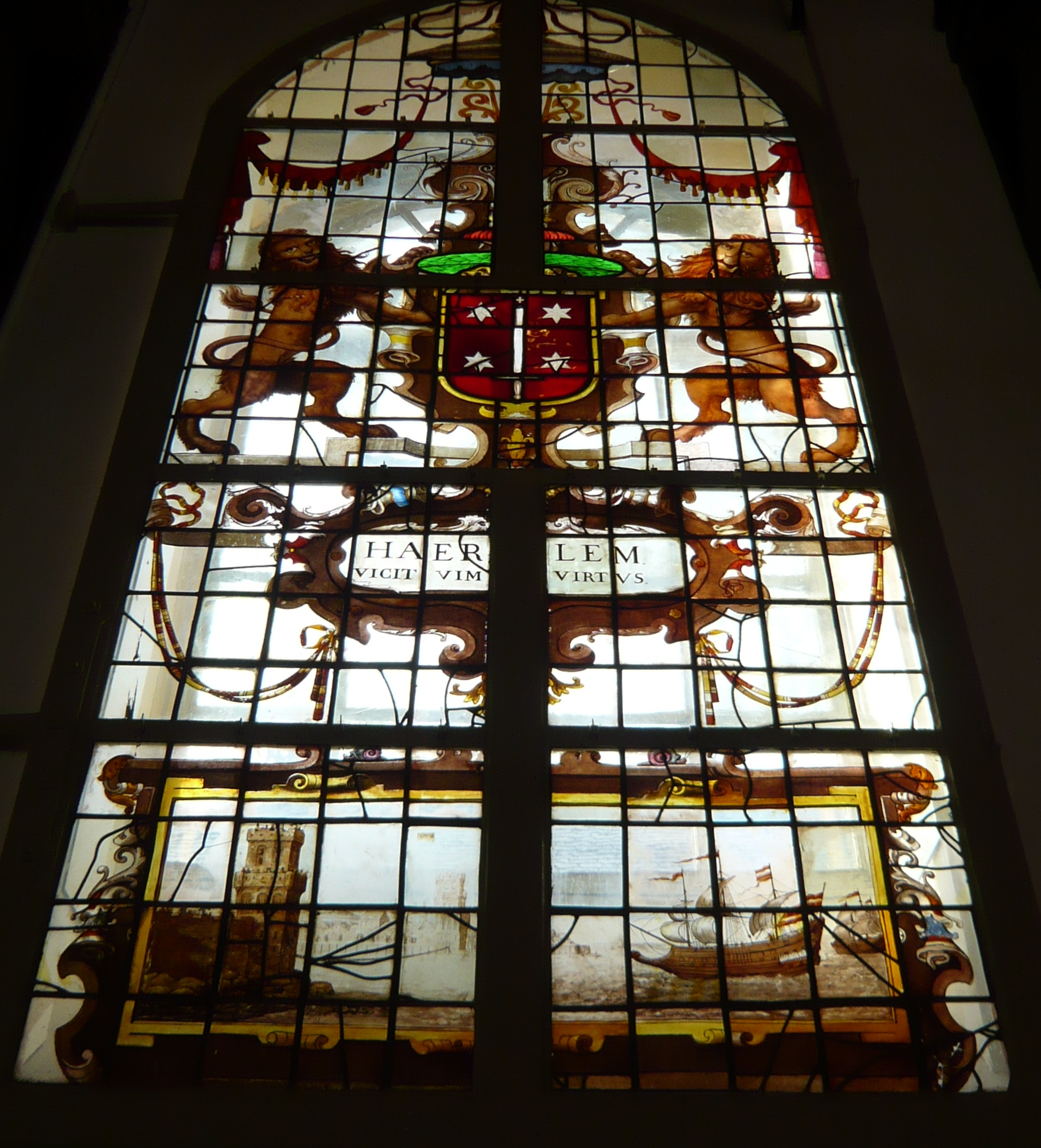
Same theme in stained glass.

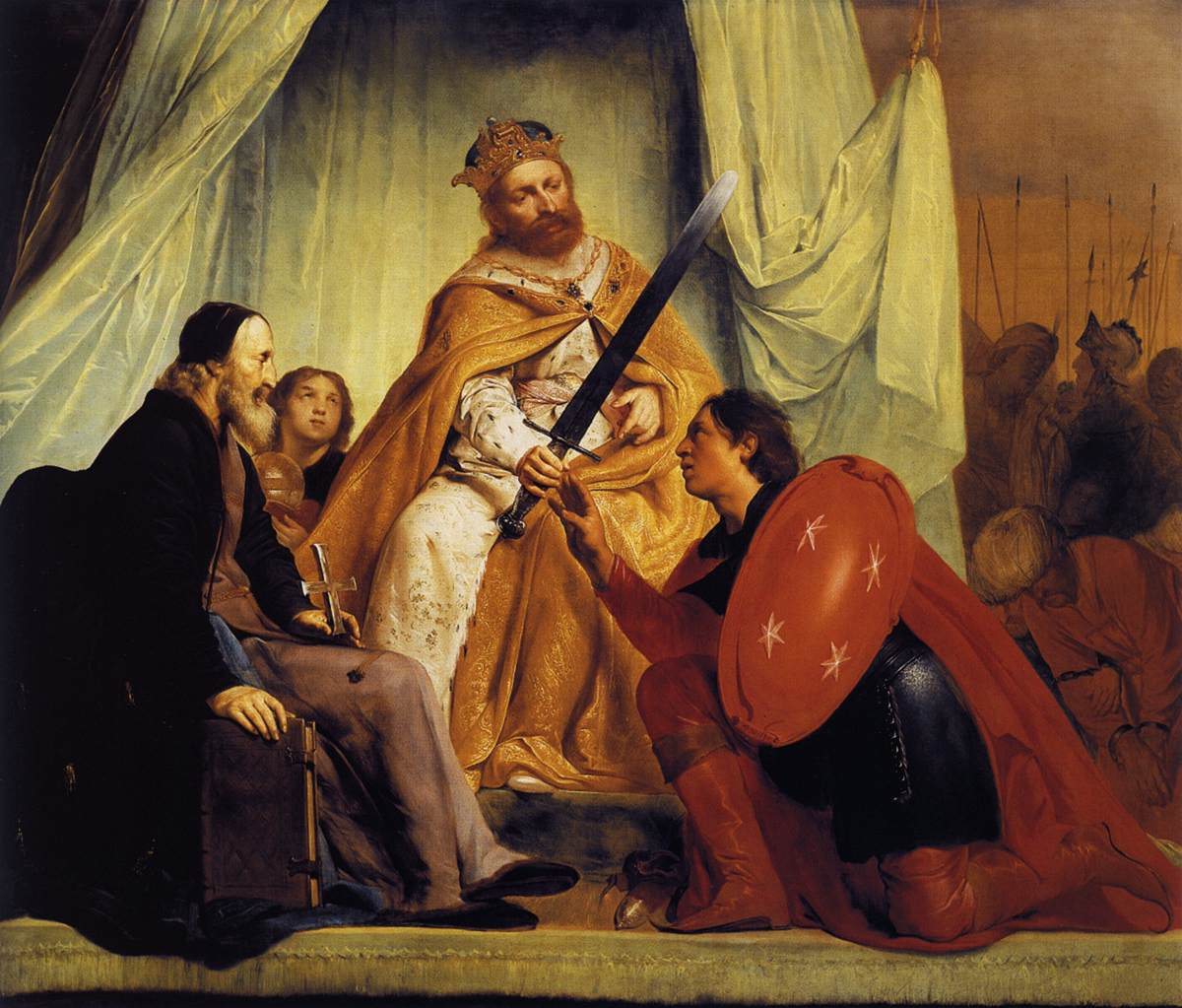
Painting of the legend of the Haarlem shield.

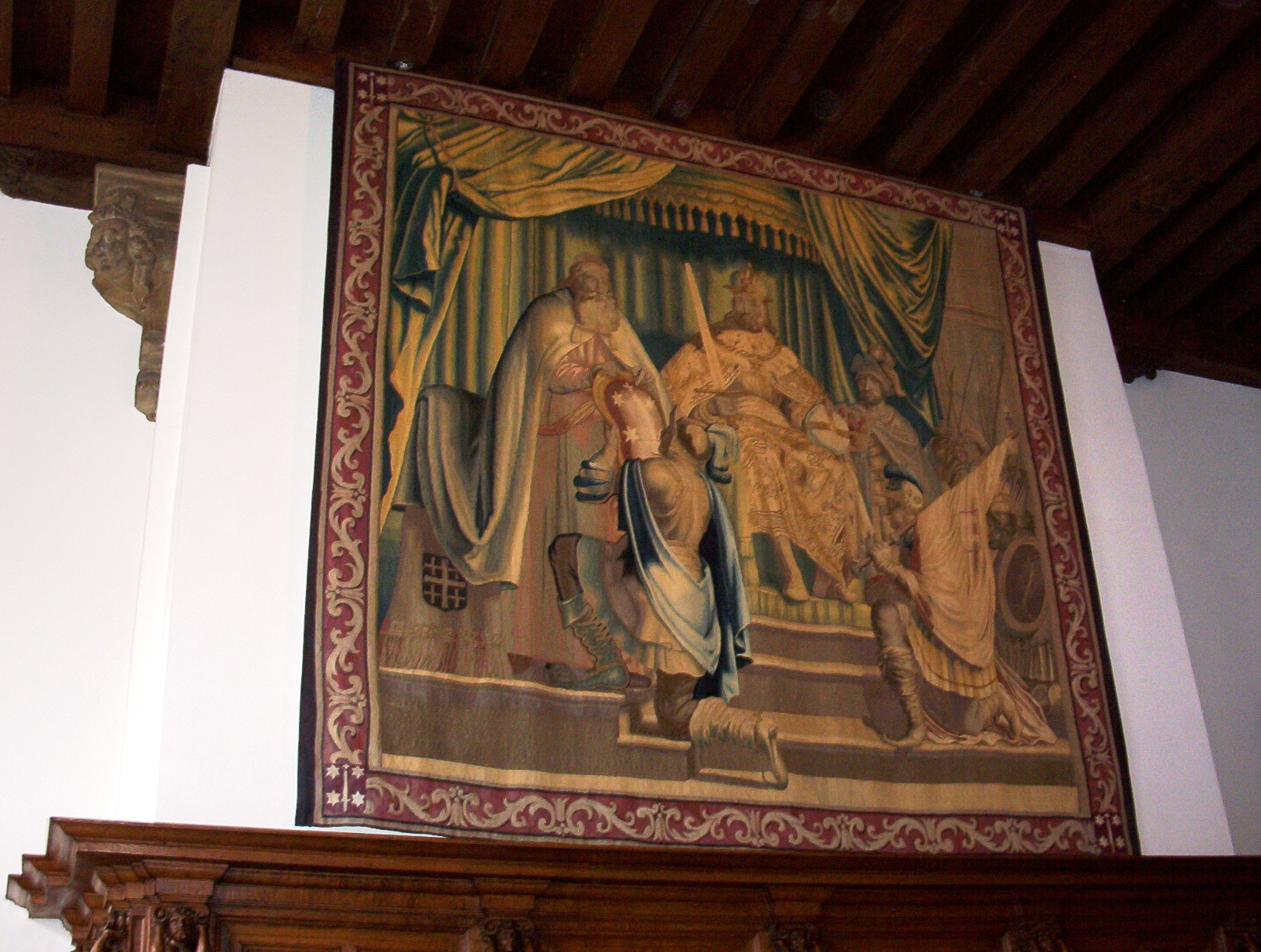
Same theme in tapestry form.

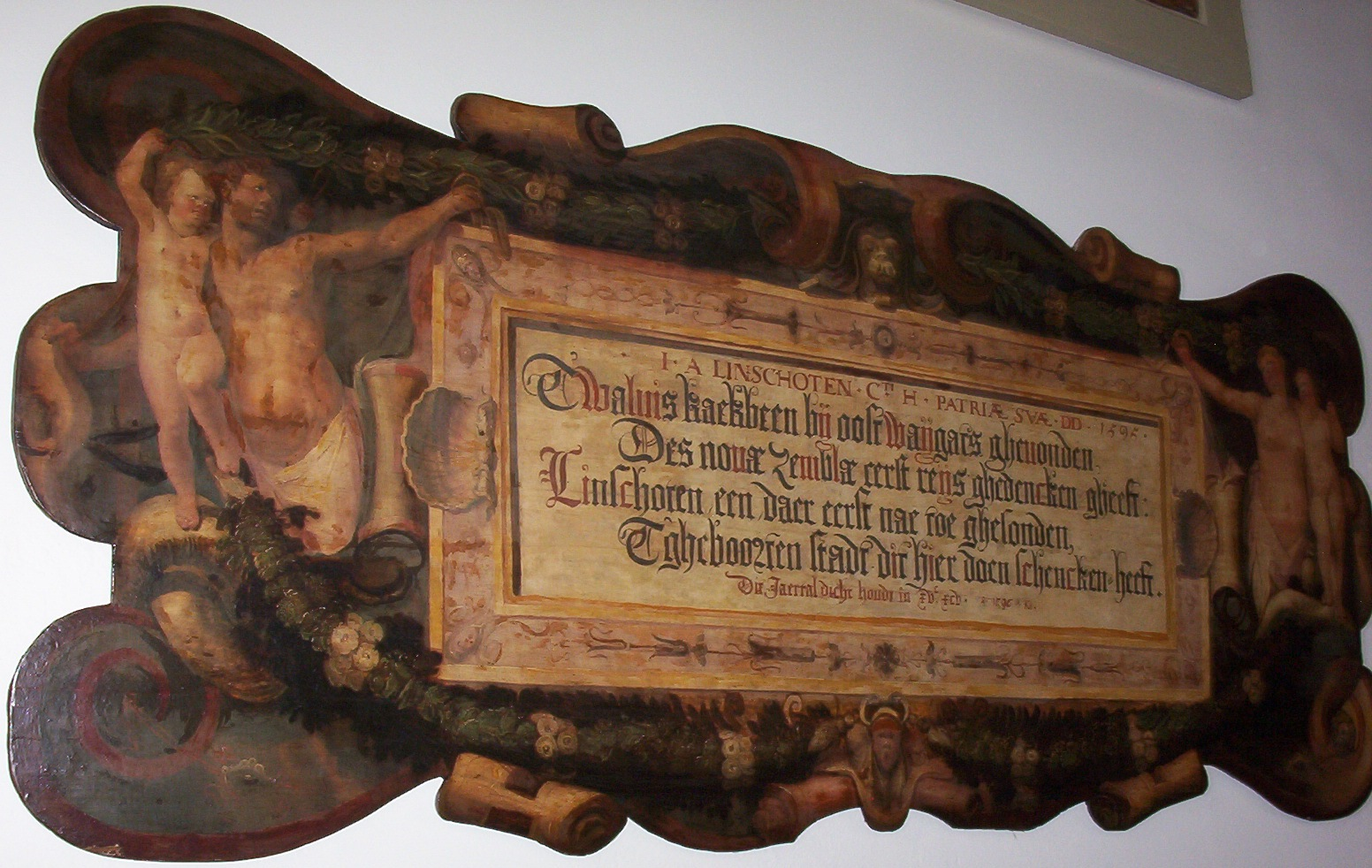
Plaque by Karel van Mander commemorating whalebone given to Haarlem by Jan Huyghen van Linschoten from Willem Barentsz expedition.

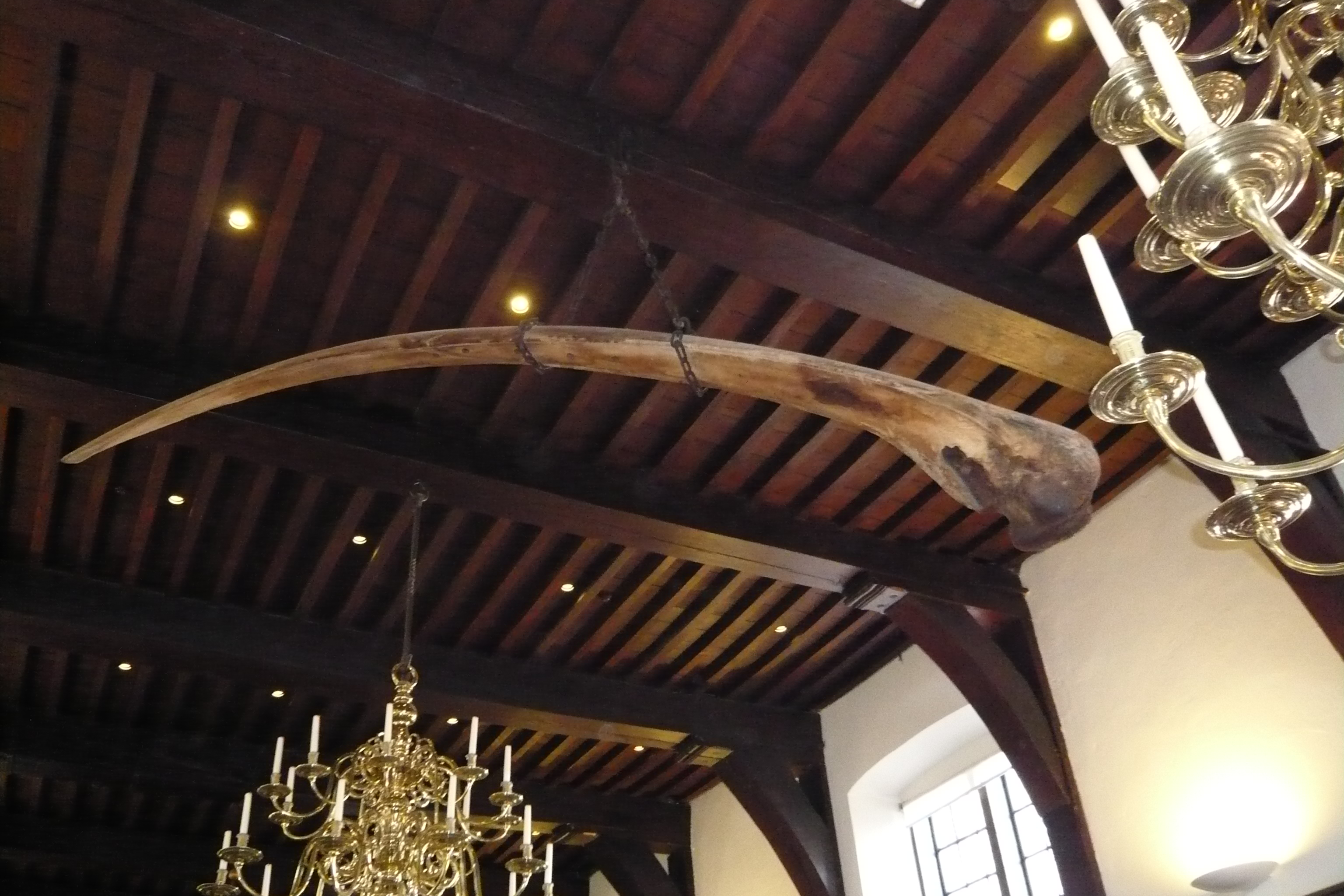
The whalebone itself, hanging from the rafters.

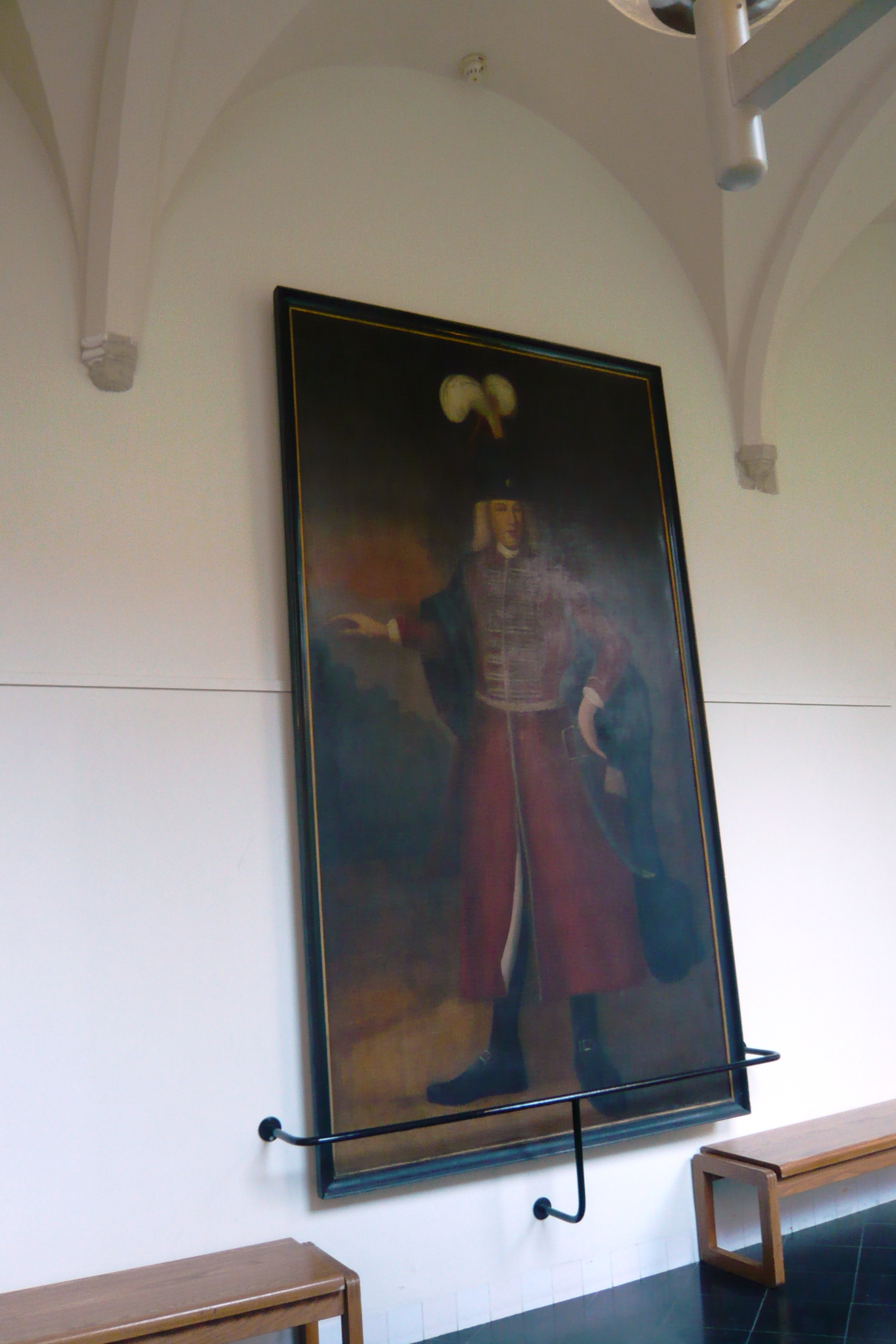
Painting of the giant Daniel Cajanus.

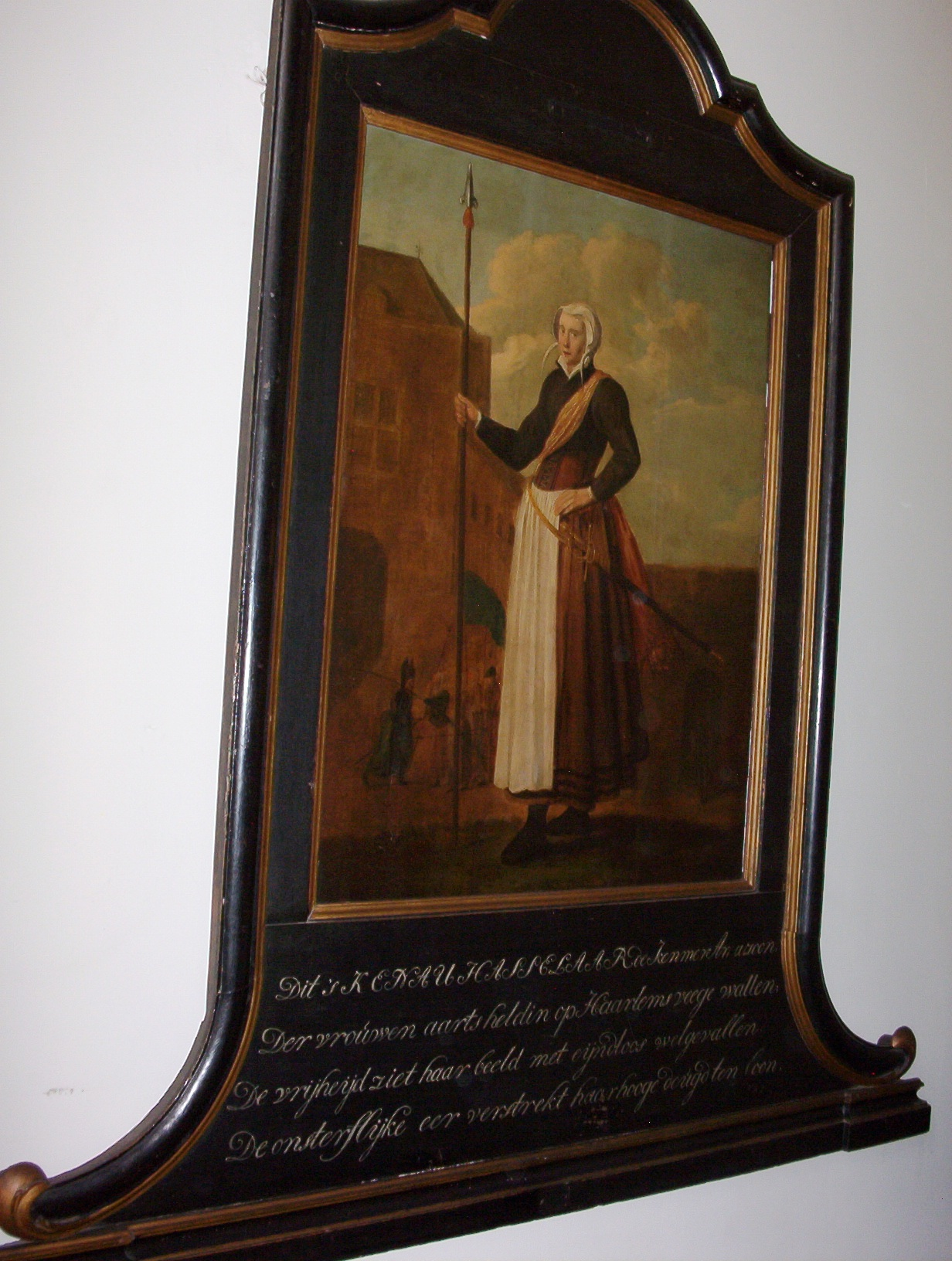
Painting of Kenau Simonsdochter Hasselaer.

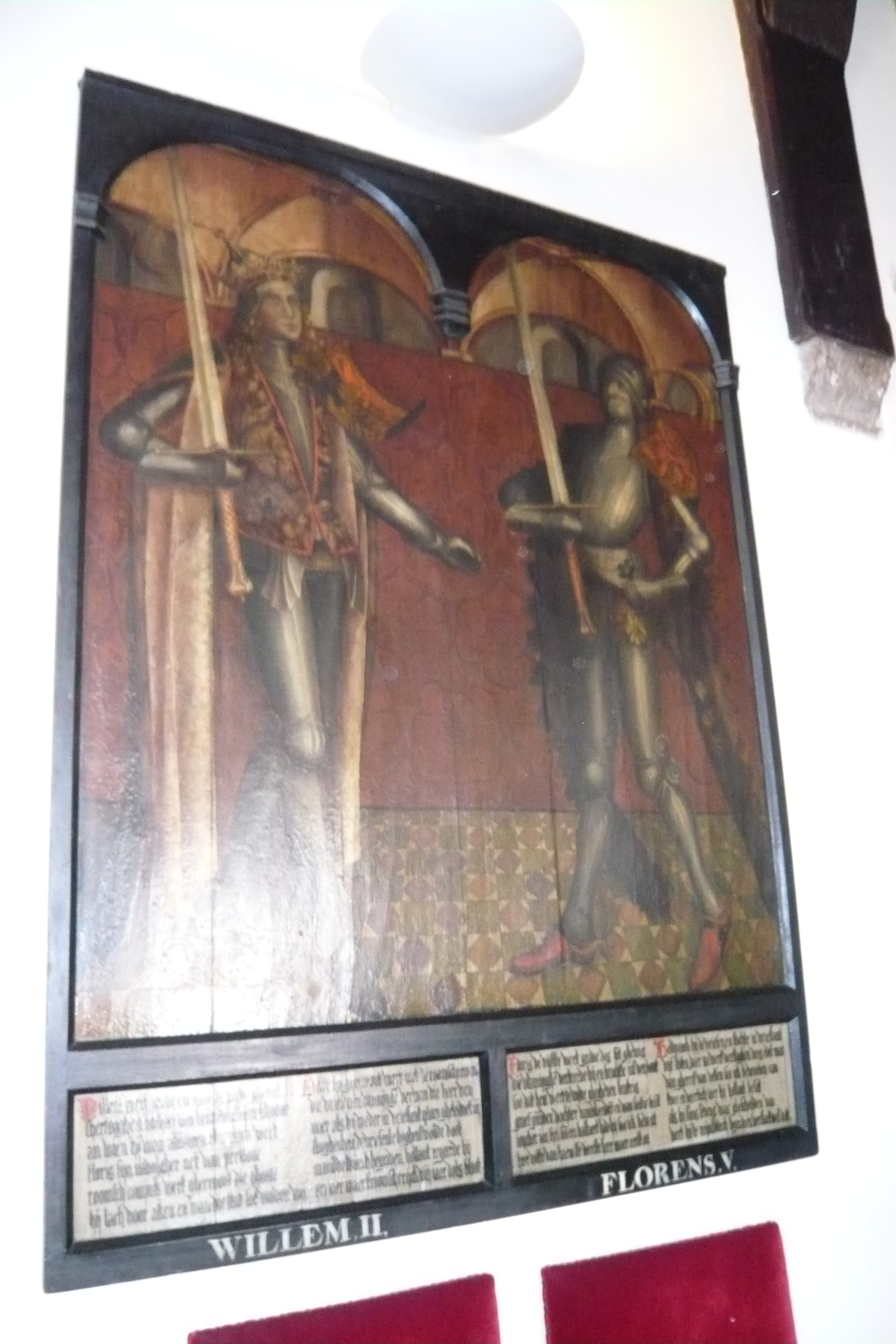
One of the double portraits of the Counts of Holland, showing William II of Holland and Floris V, Count of Holland
