= Proveniershuis =

Hofje in Haarlem, Netherlands

Coordinates: 52°22′38″N 4°37′52″E

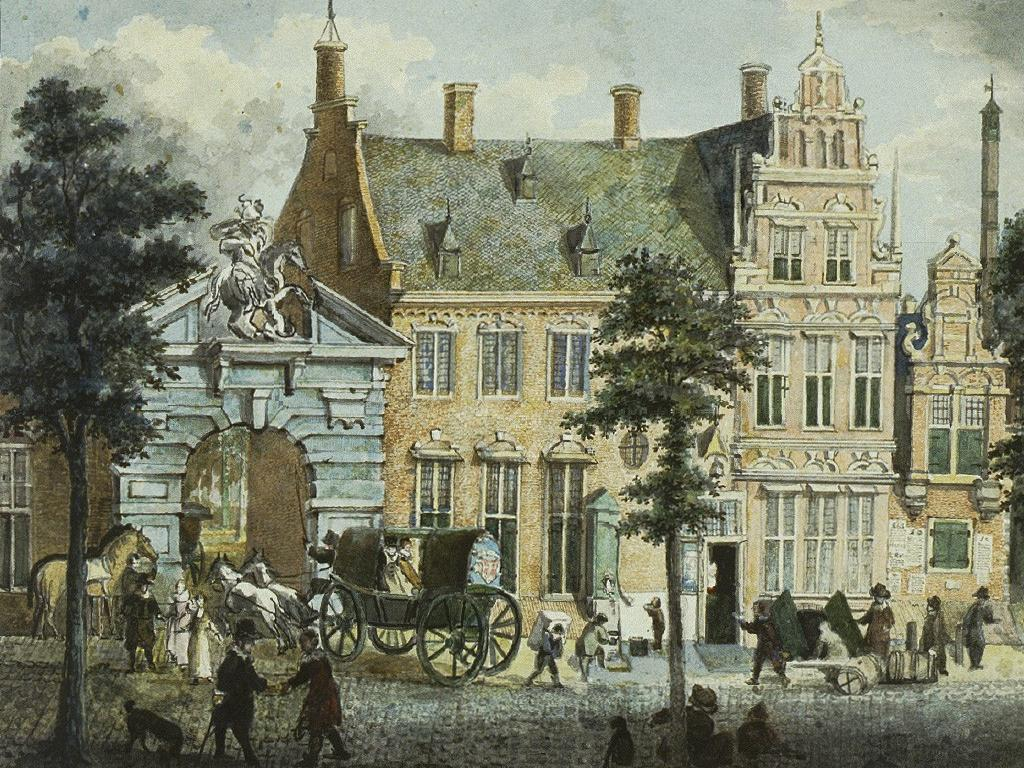
Proveniershuis in Haarlem

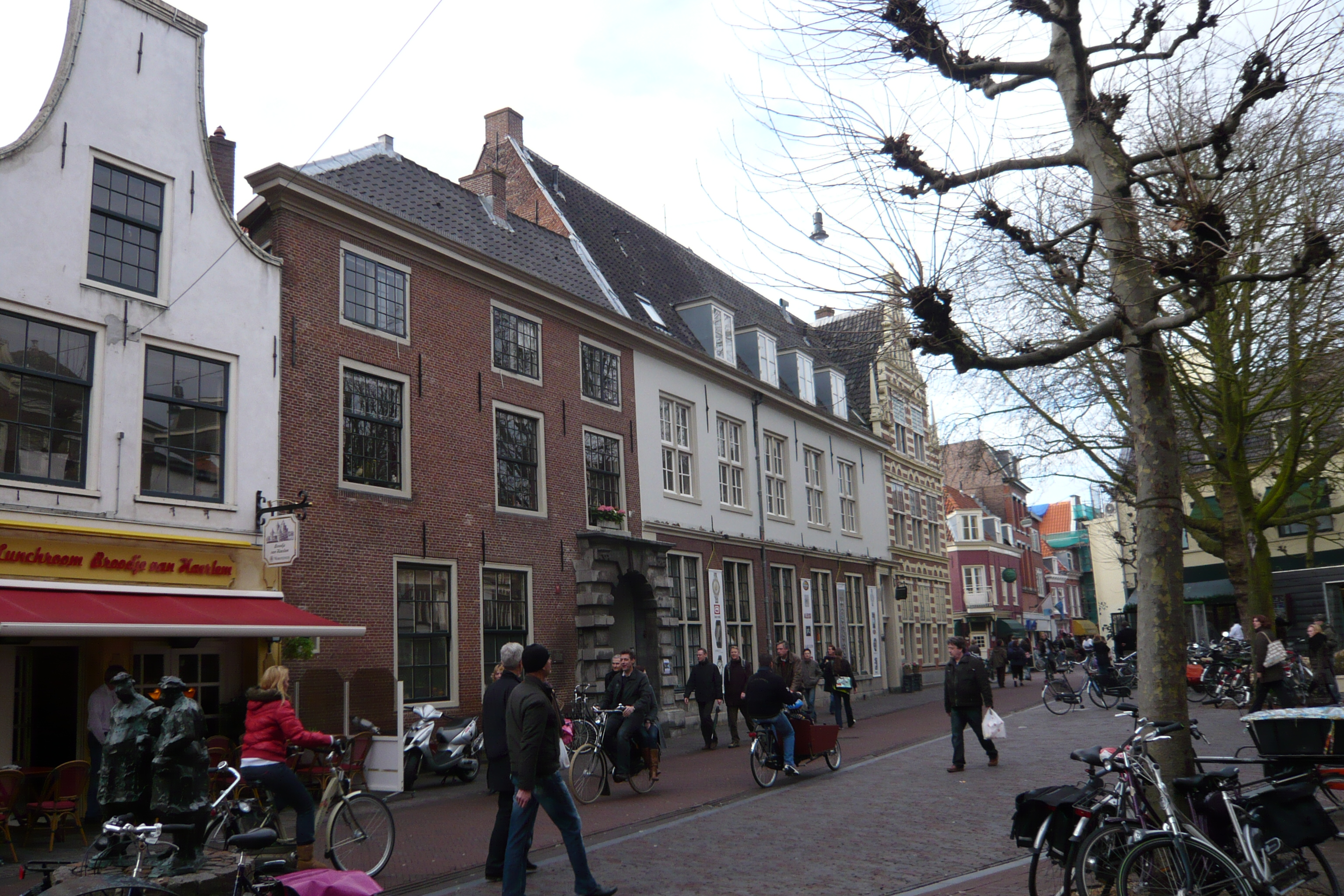
Proveniershuis on the Grote Houtstraat on a Saturday. From the 1890s up until the 1930s a tram ran past the door.

The Proveniershuis is a hofje and former schutterij on the Grote Houtstraat in Haarlem, Netherlands.

The complex of buildings surrounds a rectangular garden taking up a city block that is on the Haarlem hofje route. Unlike hofjes that were meant for poor elderly women, the homes around this courtyard are much larger, and the garden itself is about twice the normal size. The reason is that these inhabitants were men who actually paid rent to live there, as opposed to hofje inhabitants who had no income to spend on rent. Most hofjes were for women, because they were able to run their own modest household, usually as a member of a "hofje team" in various responsible roles. Men were generally less able to take care of themselves and were thus dependent on the "preuves" in the form of simple meals and services that were paid for from rents.

== History ==
This home for Haarlem proveniers was founded in 1707 by the city council to house elderly men. The main buildings are much older than that. The entire site was once a nunnery, called the St. Michielsklooster, from the 14th century up to the Protestant Reformation, when all church lands reverted to the city council. The Haarlem archives still have a first-hand account of one of the original nuns, Elisabeth Verhagen, who was moved to a house on the Begijnhof after the reformation. She complained of the plundering of her old cloister and the fact that all the sisters were split up and sent to live elsewhere. They had to make room for the St. Joris Doelen, or St. George Militia.

== St. Jorisdoelen ==
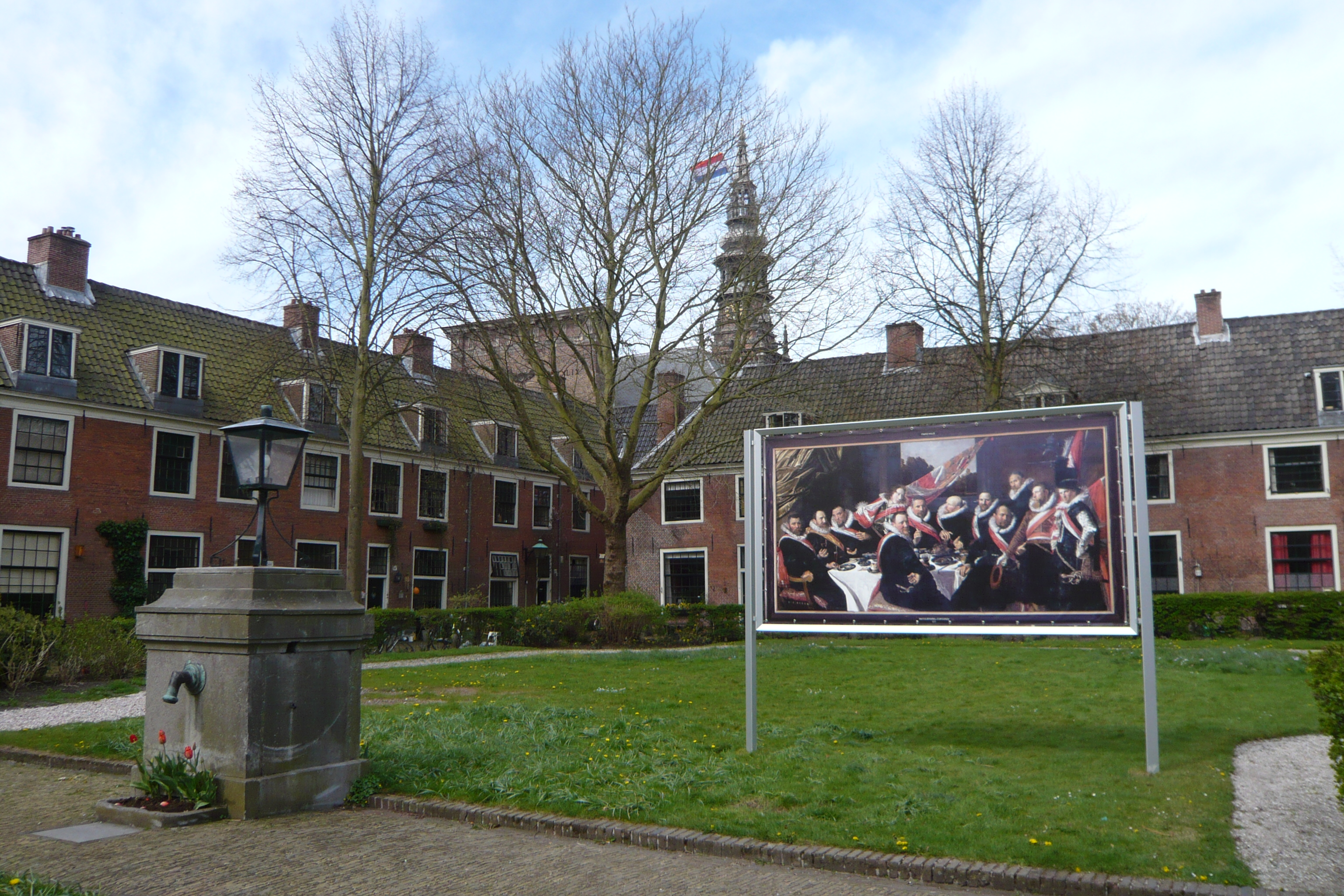
A reproduction of Frans Hals' first schutterstuk in the garden. The church tower in the distance is the Nieuwe Kerk, Haarlem.

In 1577, the city council refurbished the main buildings to house the Haarlem schutterij called the "Oude schuts", and since before the reformation they had been a guild with patron saint St. Joris, or St. George, this was called the St. Jorisdoelen, or St. George militia target field. The garden was converted to include two shooting lanes; one for bow and arrow, and one for the blunderbuss. The fancy St. Joris militiamen, who during the course of the 17th-century met more often together for shooting practise than for fighting or policing the streets, were painted several times in schutterstukken, most notably by militia member Frans Hals.

=== Schutterstukken ===
Today, the Frans Hals Museum houses several schutterstukken, which are group portraits of the officers of the St. George militia painted to commemorate the end of a three-year term of service. These paintings once hung in the main hall and were considered tourist attractions in their day. As they accumulated over the course of time, they were slowly crowded out, so not all schutterstukken have survived. The list of paintings that have survived up to the present day are as follows:

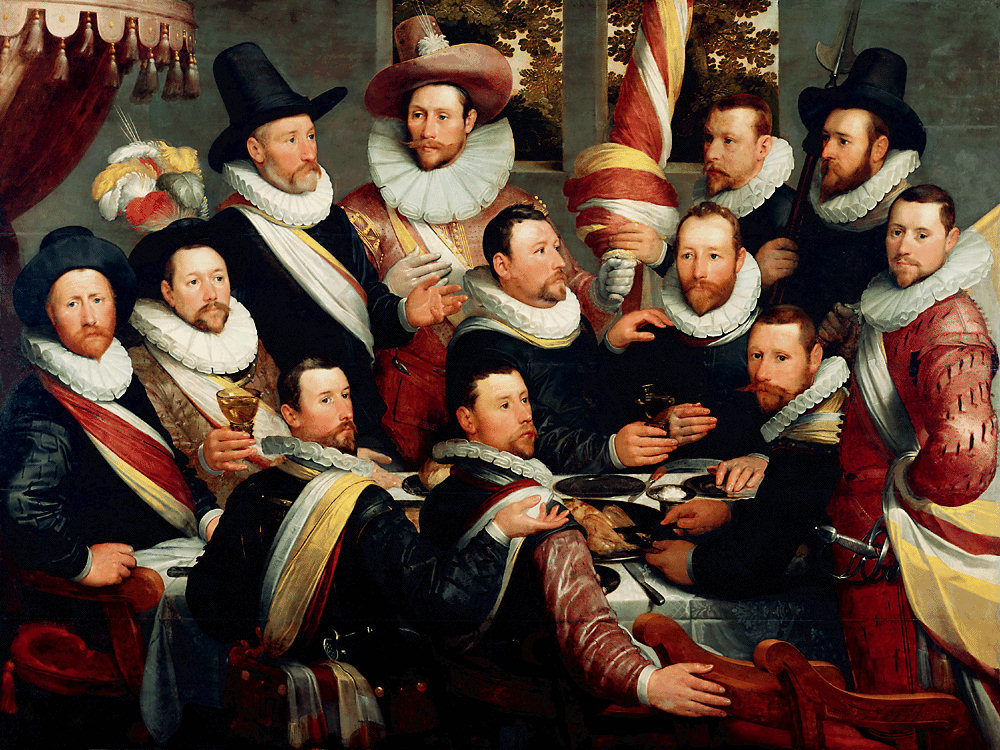
1599, Cornelis Cornelisz van Haarlem

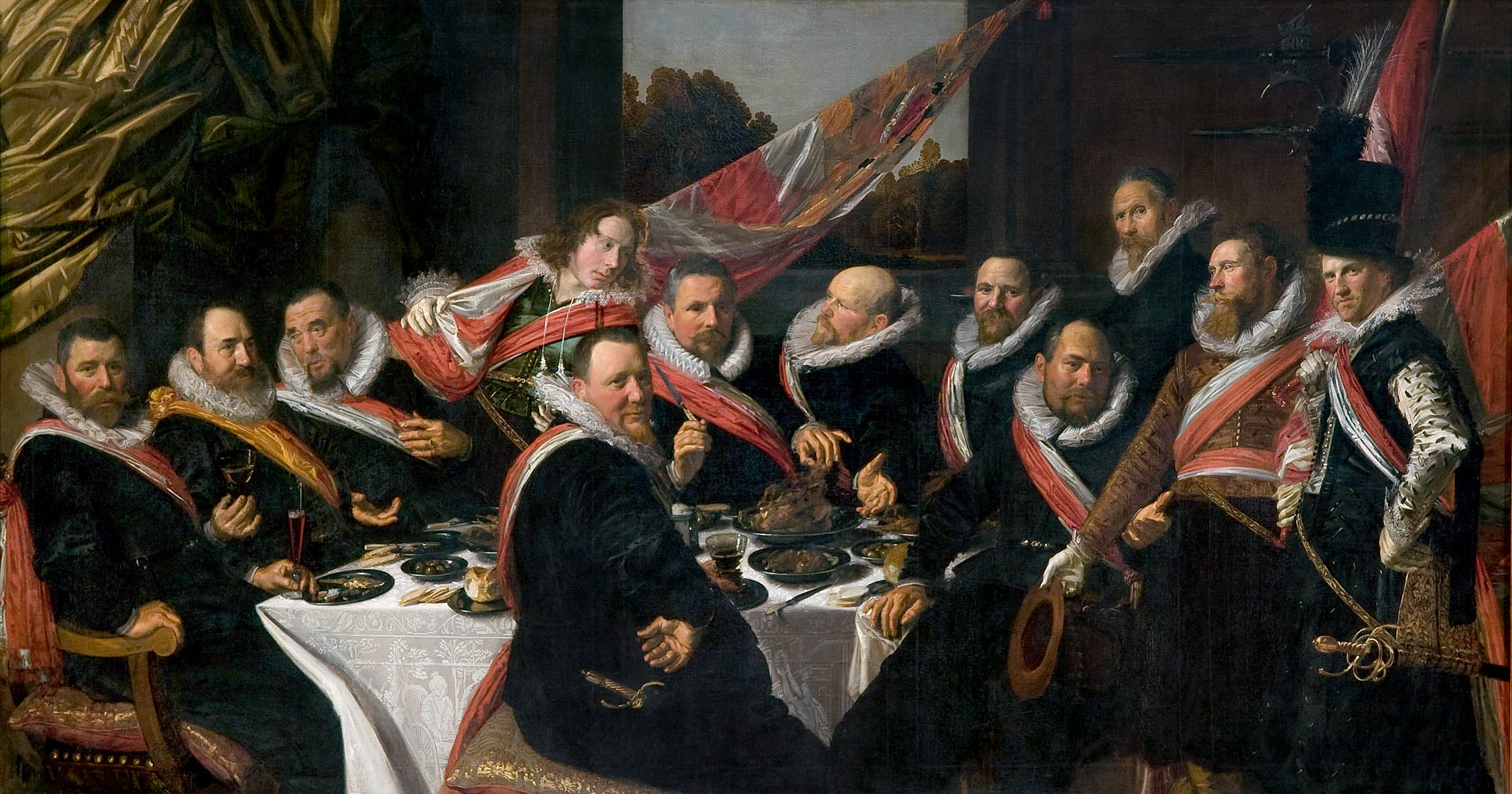
1616, Frans Hals

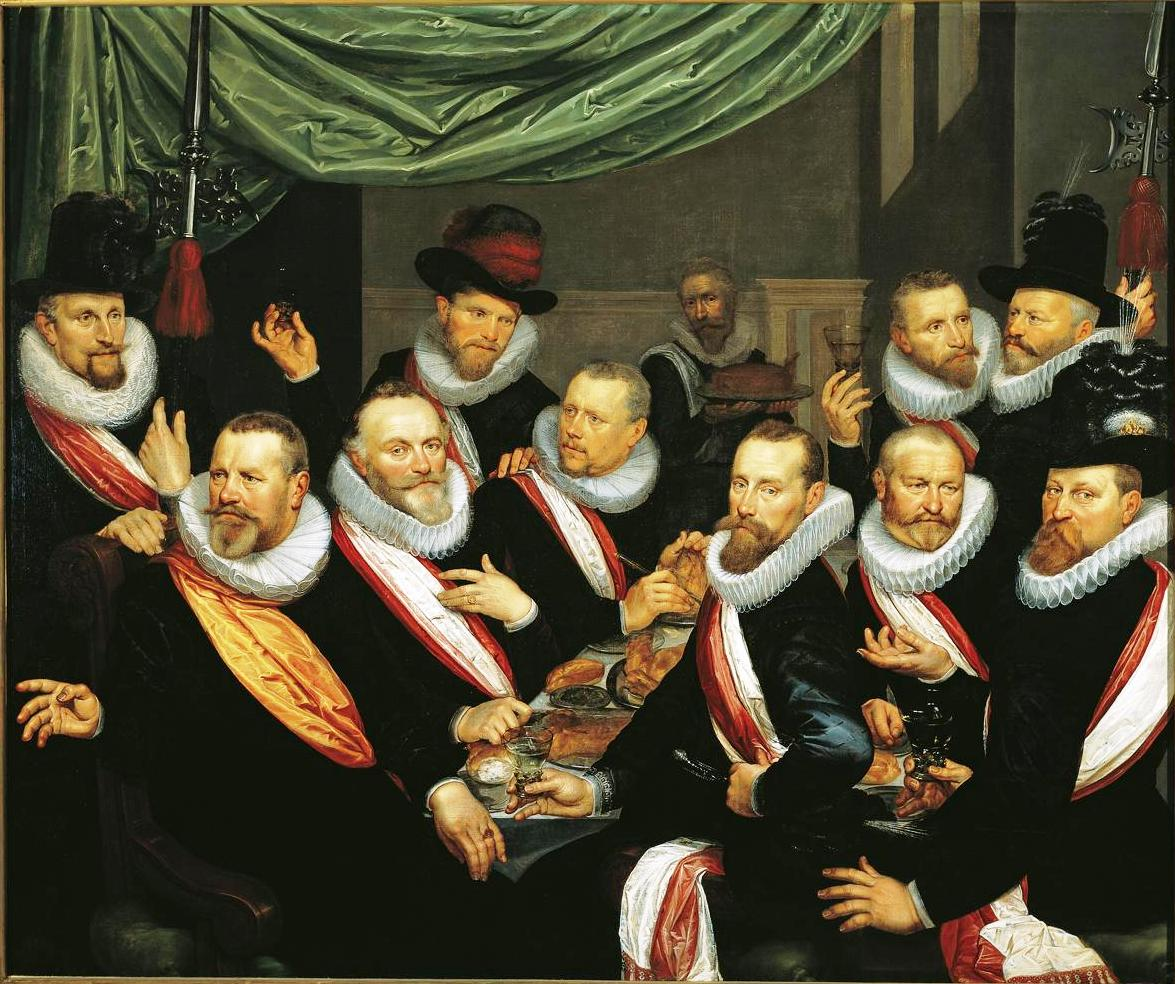
1618, Frans Pietersz de Grebber

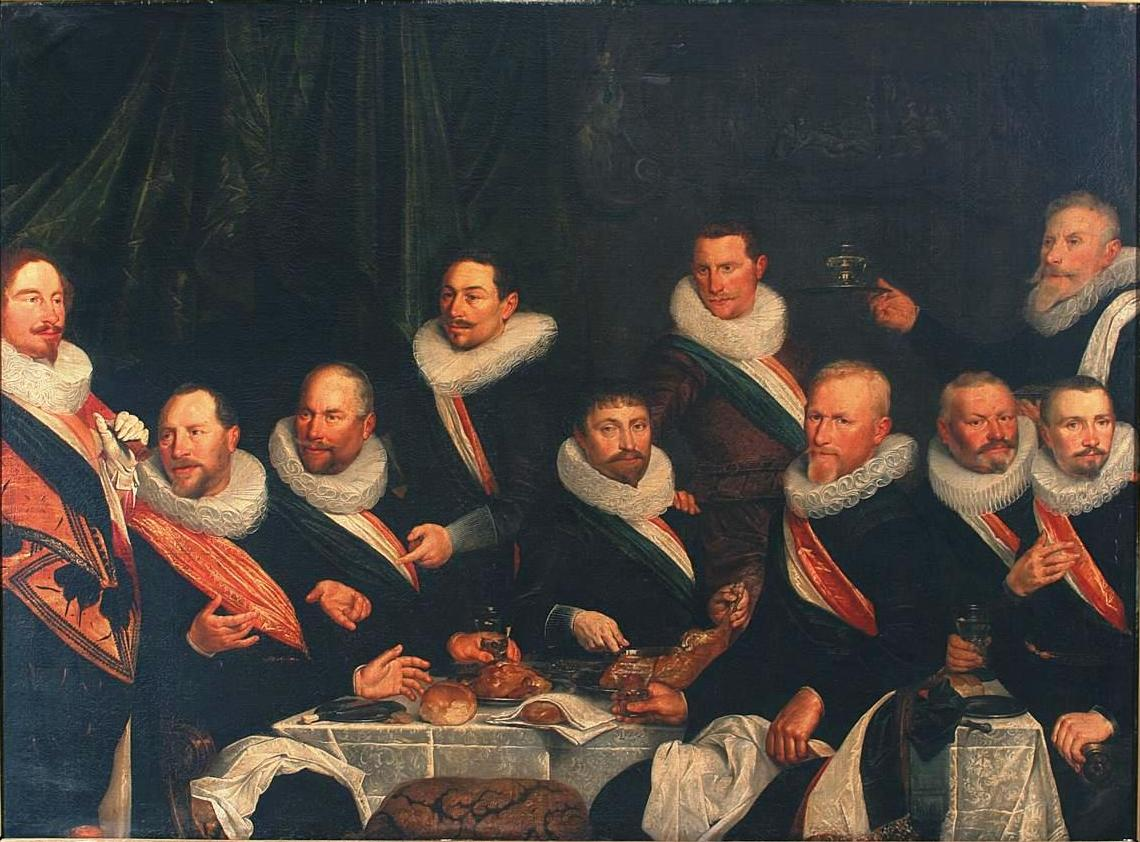
1624, Frans Pietersz. de Grebber

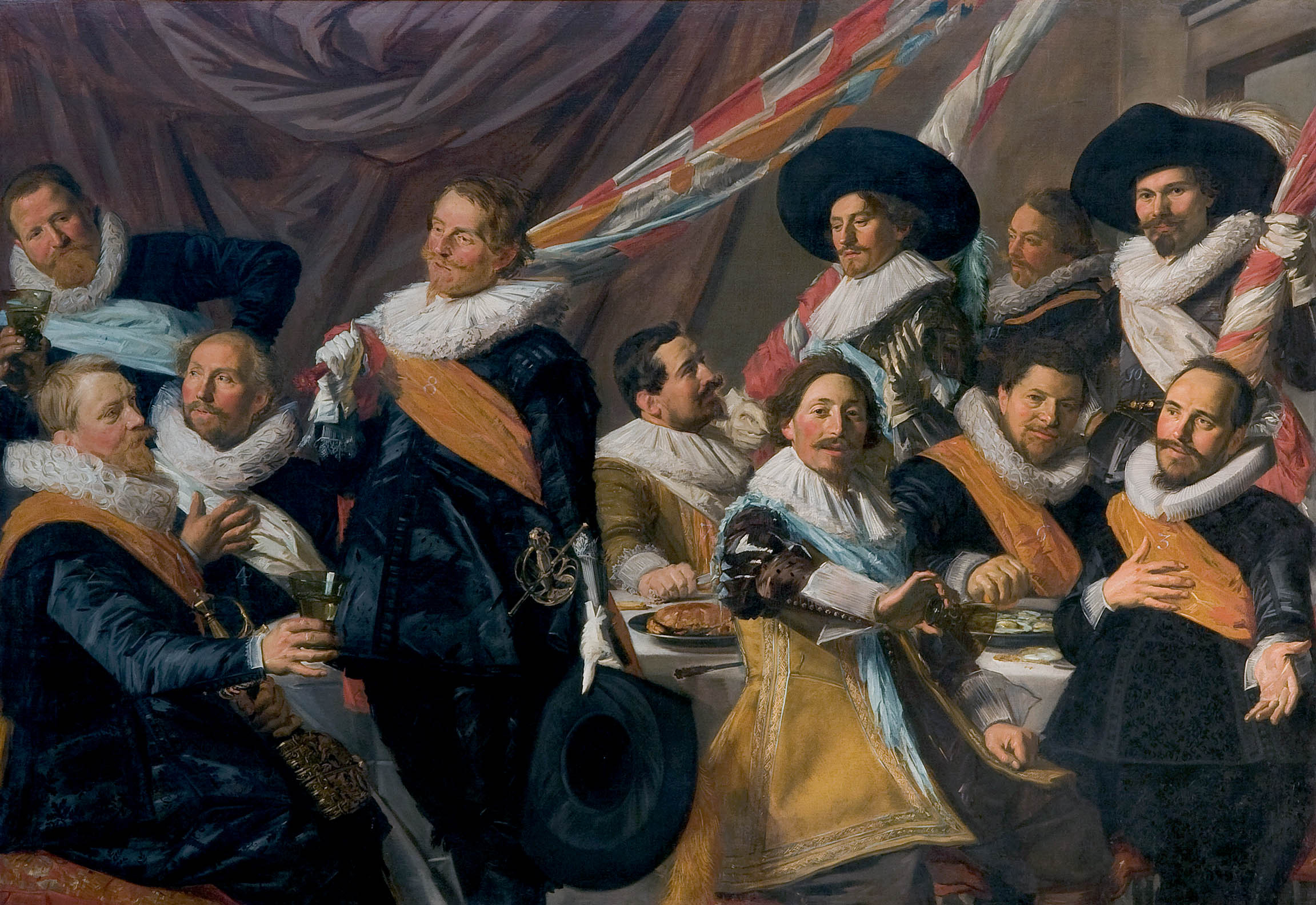
1627, Frans Hals

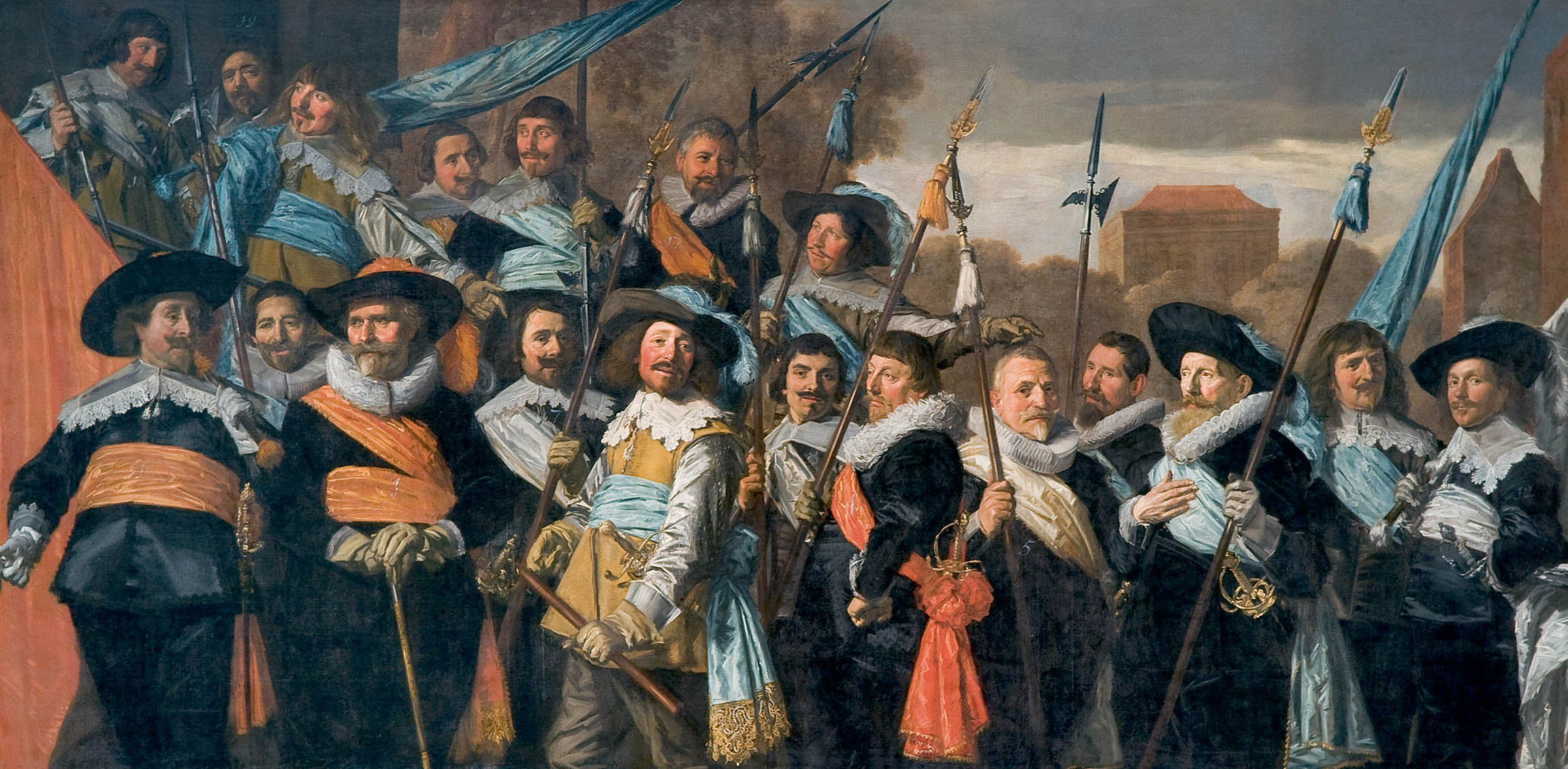
1639, Frans Hals (with self-portrait)

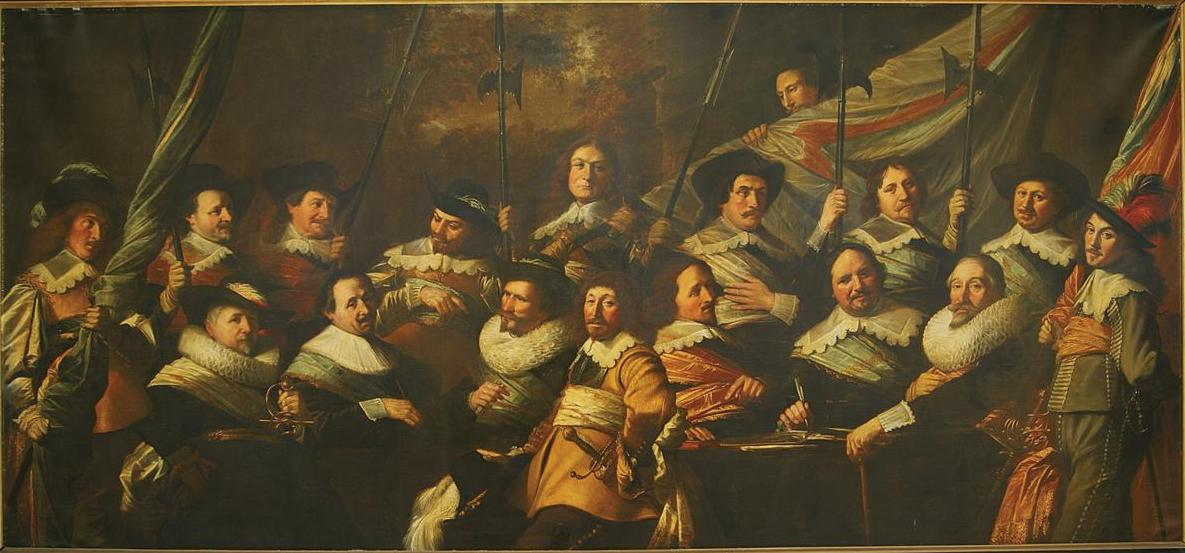
1644, Pieter Claesz Soutman

== From fancy inn to old age home ==
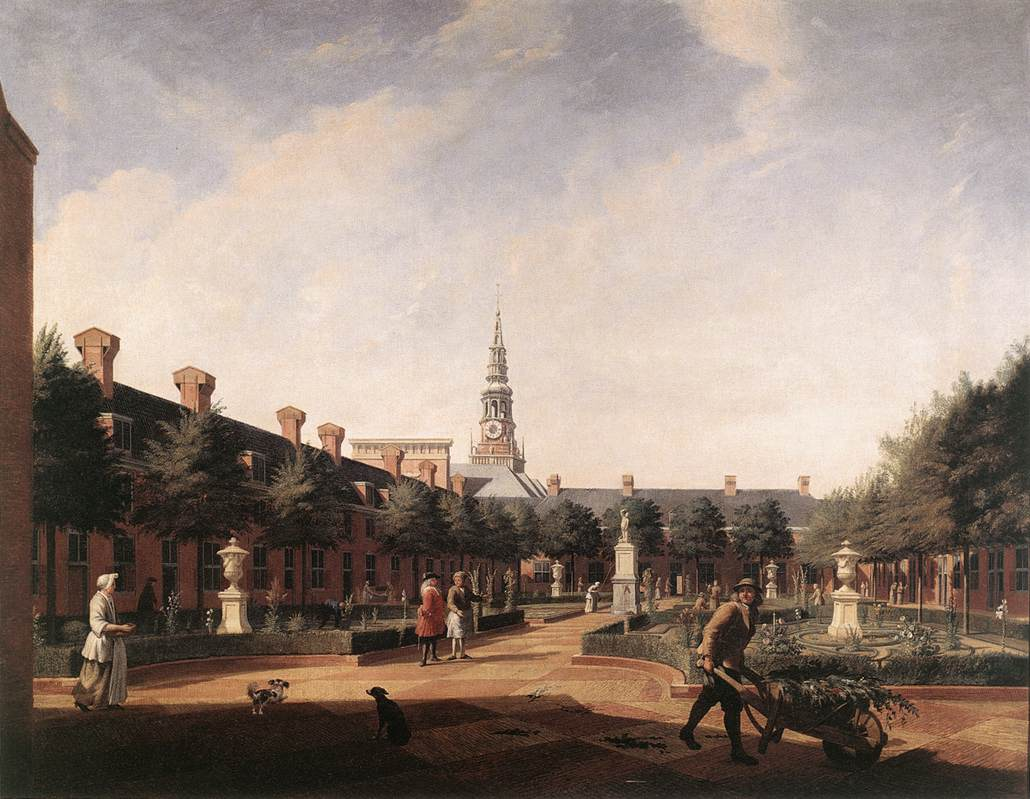
painting of the garden in 1735, by Vincent Laurensz van der Vinne II

The complex was the domain of militiamen until well into the 17th century, but in 1688 Romeyn de Hooghe made an etching of the building, calling it the Heren Logement, or gentlemen's hotel. In 1682 it had been restored by the city architect Lieven de Key for this purpose, with rooms being made for travelers in the top floors, and a main hall below. It was meant to be a chic refuge for travelers by coach, but this never quite succeeded, because the coaches never stopped there. In 1707 it became the proveniershuis, serving older men who could pay room and board. Older men with no money at all were kept in the men's poor house known as the Oudemannenhuis, a similar courtyard complex just a few blocks away and currently housing the Frans Hals Museum. The regents were painted in 1736 by Frans Decker. These men were: Cornelis Ascanius van Sypesteyn (1694-1744), A. de Bruijn, Jacobus Barnaart (1696-1762), M. Kuijts en Jan Reeland (1708-1755), group portrait by Frans Decker. The man standing in the back is probably the secretary, but his name is unknown.

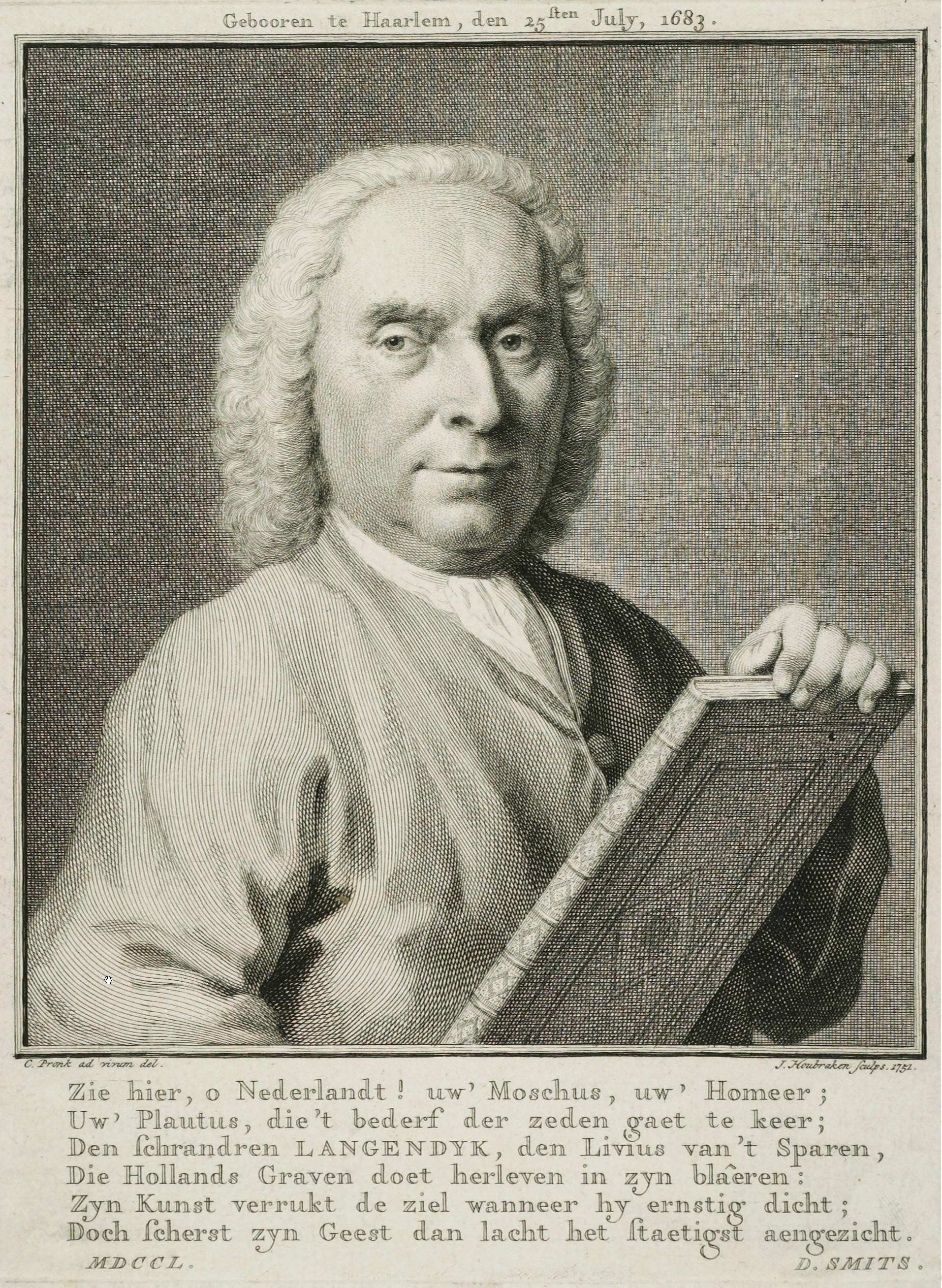
Pieter Langendijk

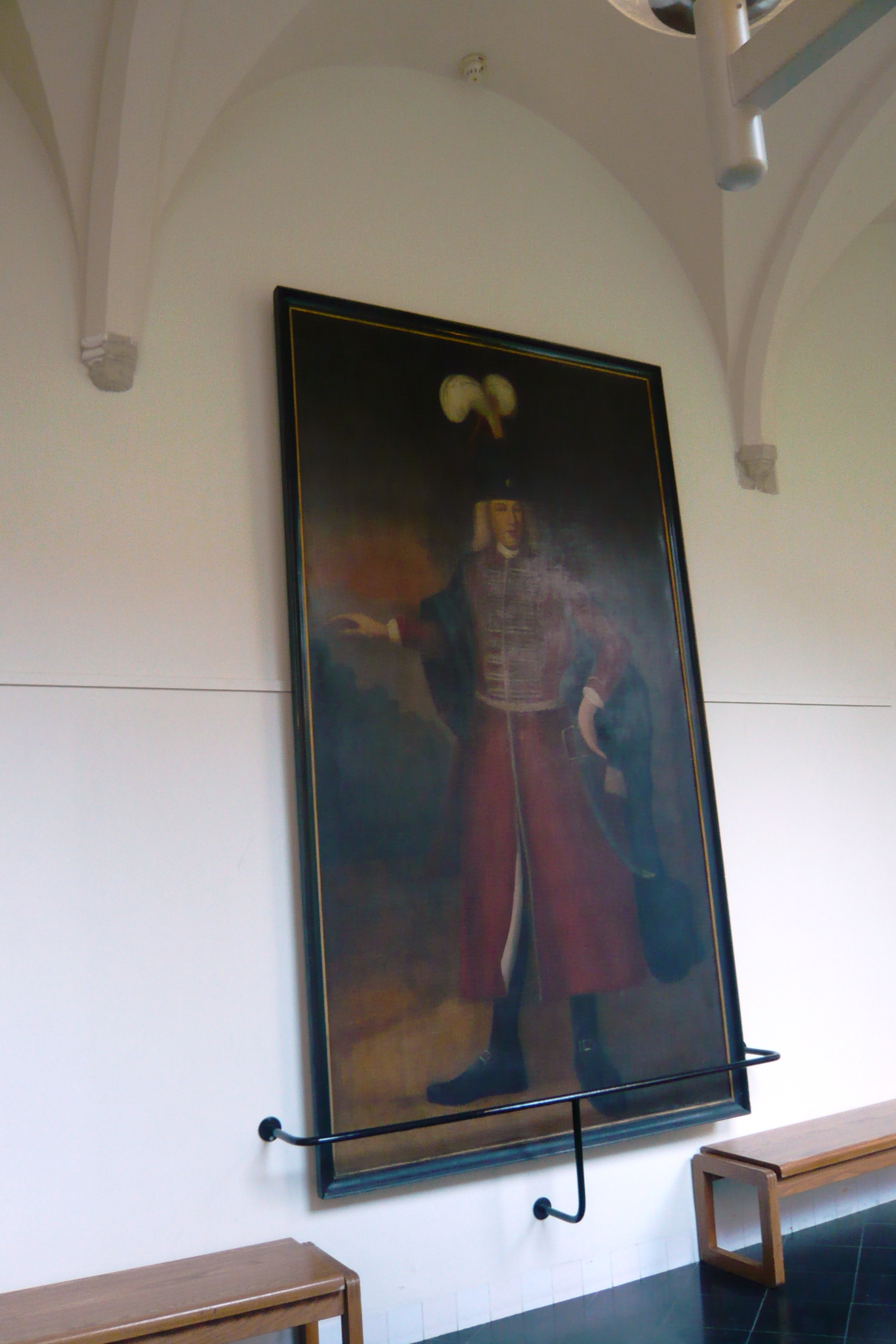
Daniel Cajanus in Haarlem city hall.

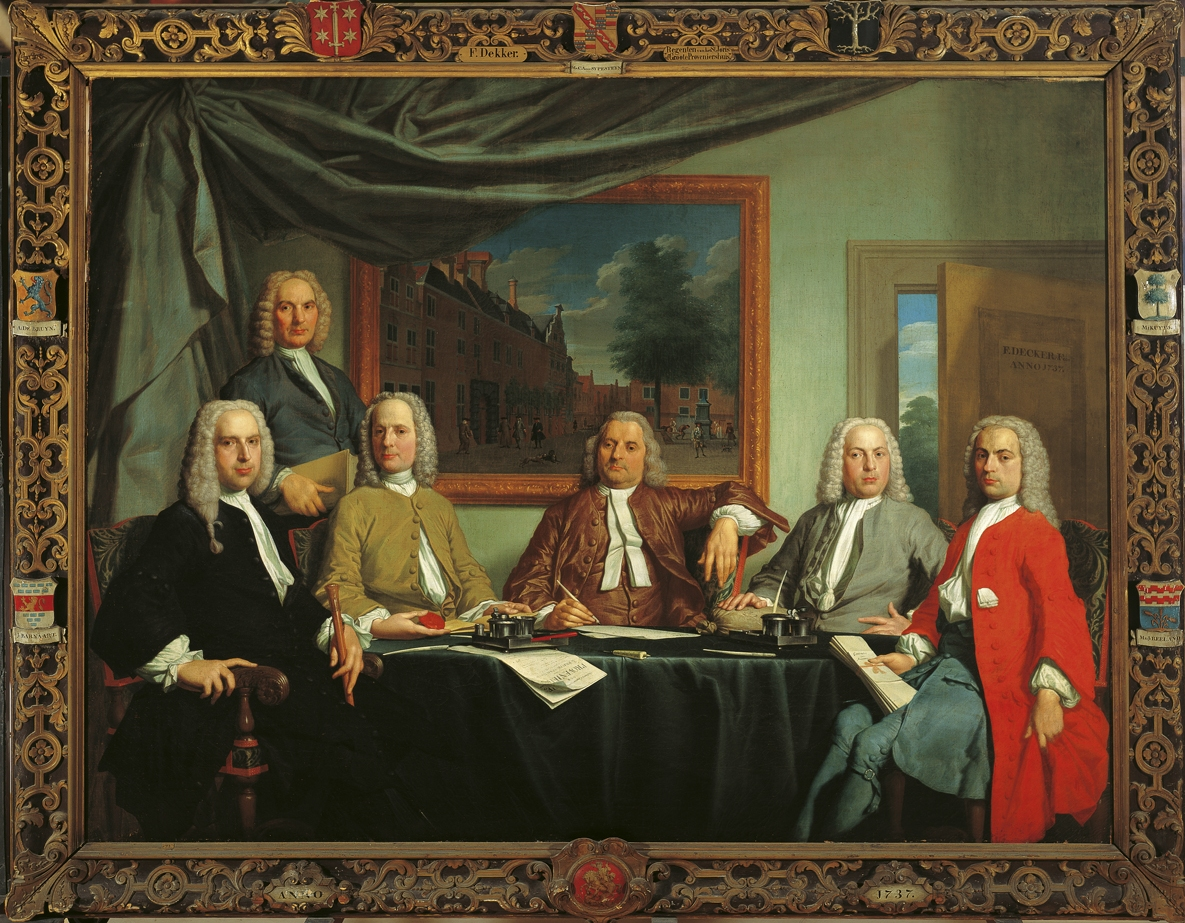
The regents in 1736 by Frans Decker.

The most famous men who stayed in the Proveniershuis in the 18th century were Daniel Cajanus, the "Wonderful giant" Finn who was said to be eight feet high, and Pieter Langendijk, the Dutch historian. Daniel Cajanus was buried in the Sint-Bavokerk when he died in 1749 and a commemorative painting of him now hangs in the lower back cloisters of the city hall. From Pieter Langendijk's stories, we know a bit about the daily life of the average provenier.

== French occupation and 19th-century ==
In 1810 during the French occupation the French used the Oudemannenhuis as a garrison and the elderly men were merged with the proveniers in the Proveniershuis, giving it more of a hofje function. In 1866 the hofje van Alkemade was merged into the Proveniershuis and it became Proveniershof. That hofje was torn down to build the new wing of the local library, itself on the grounds of the other militia of Haarlem, the St. Adriansdoelen.

Today the homes around the courtyard are rentals; and the main building houses a shop and a lunch room catering to the busy shoppers in the Grote Houtstraat.

Address: Grote Houtstraat 140
