= Lieven de Key =

Flemish architect (1560–1627)

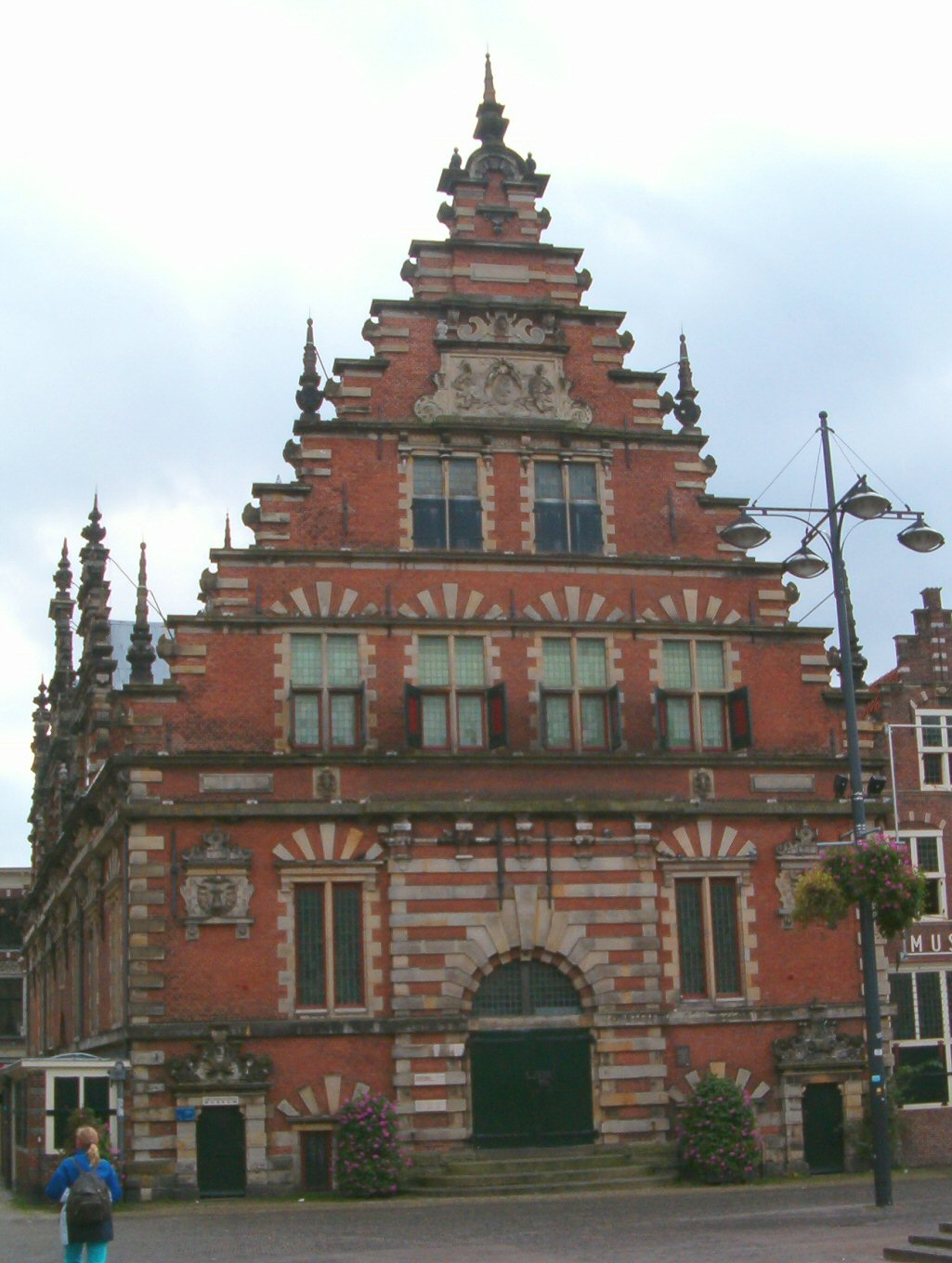
The Vleeshal at the Grote Markt in Haarlem is a prime example of the work of Lieven de Key. It was built in 1602–1604. The large Haarlem shield on the front is attributed to Hendrik de Keyser, and some decorations are from drawings by Hans Vredeman de Vries.

Lieven de Key (1560 – 17 July 1627) was a Flemish renaissance architect who after working in his native Flanders moved to work in the Dutch Republic. He is mostly known today for his works in Haarlem. His style is described by Simon Schama as Mannerist.

== Biography ==
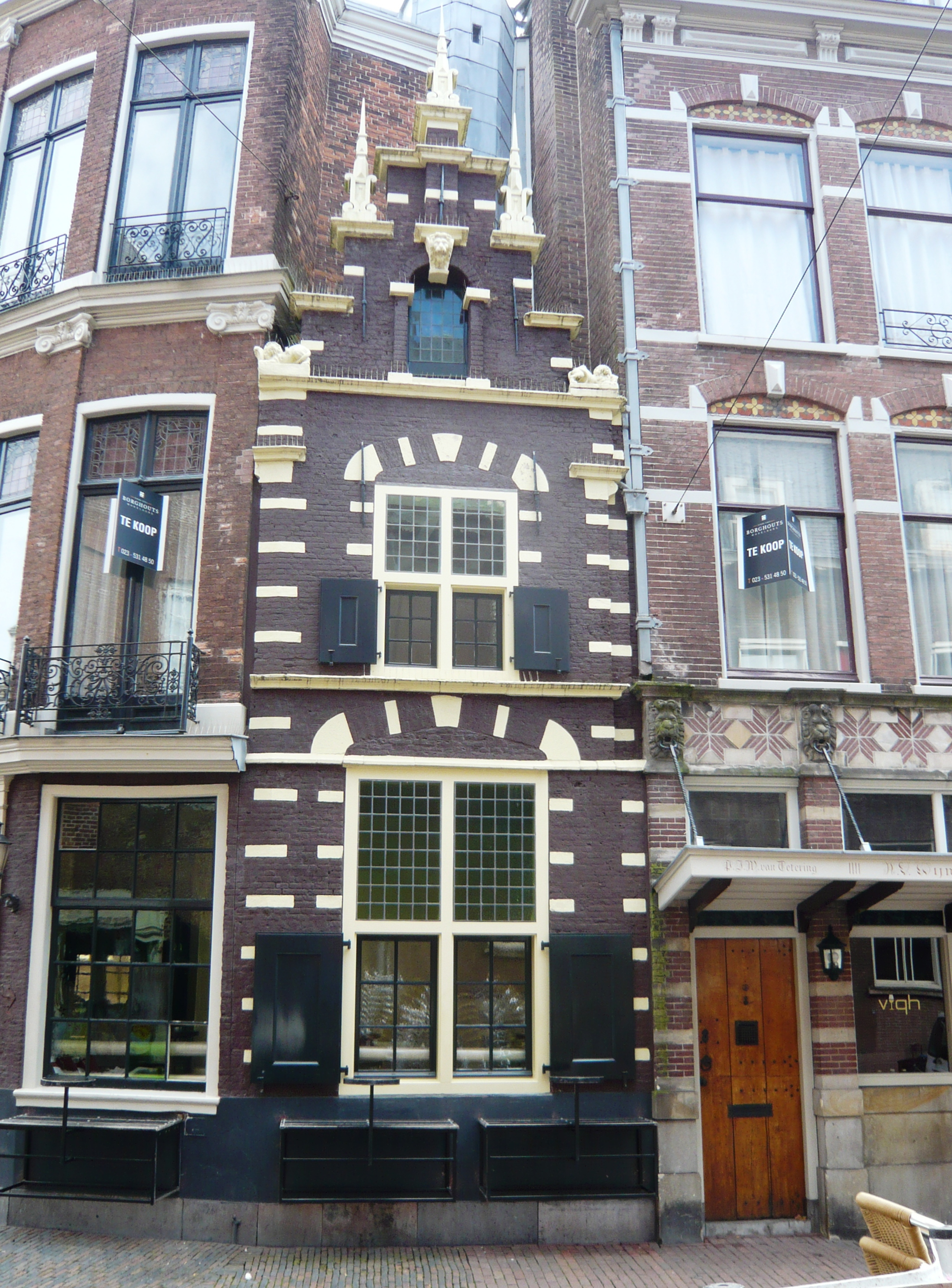
This small facade is said to be a masterpiece or demonstration of De Key's abilities, who built it to prove his mastery of the art of masonry and architectural design. It faces the city hall side entrance, where the decision makers of the Haarlem council met.

De Key was born in Ghent, and was already a well-known architect when the Haarlem council invited him to become city architect in 1592 to succeed Wouter den Abt. He brought to Haarlem the same Renaissance style that Hendrick de Keyser brought to Amsterdam. Everything attributed to him or his followers, whether a building, a doorway, or merely a gable stone, is considered a rijksmonument today.

The reason so many buildings in Haarlem can be attributed to him is because Haarlem had suffered a severe fire in 1576 that destroyed a third of the city, and plans were underway for large city projects when he was appointed city architect. Before working in Haarlem and Leiden, De Key had worked in London from 1580–1591. He died in Haarlem, aged about 77.

In more recent times, many street names, buildings and e.g. one of the largest housing companies in Amsterdam, have been named after him.

== Buildings designed ==
- Front facade of the city hall of Leiden
- The Vleeshal in Haarlem, 1602–1603
- The gymnasium in Leiden
- The tower of the St. Anna church in Haarlem, which still exists, though the rest of the church was demolished and rebuilt by Jacob van Campen
- The Waag in Haarlem, 1595
- North wing of the city hall of Haarlem, 1620
- The stone entranceway to the Proveniershuis in Haarlem, 1592
- The facade of the main hall of the Frans Hals Museum, 1604–1609
- The gateway of the St. Barbara Gasthuis, 1624
