= Archaeological Museum Haarlem =

Coordinates: 52°22′51″N 4°38′10″E

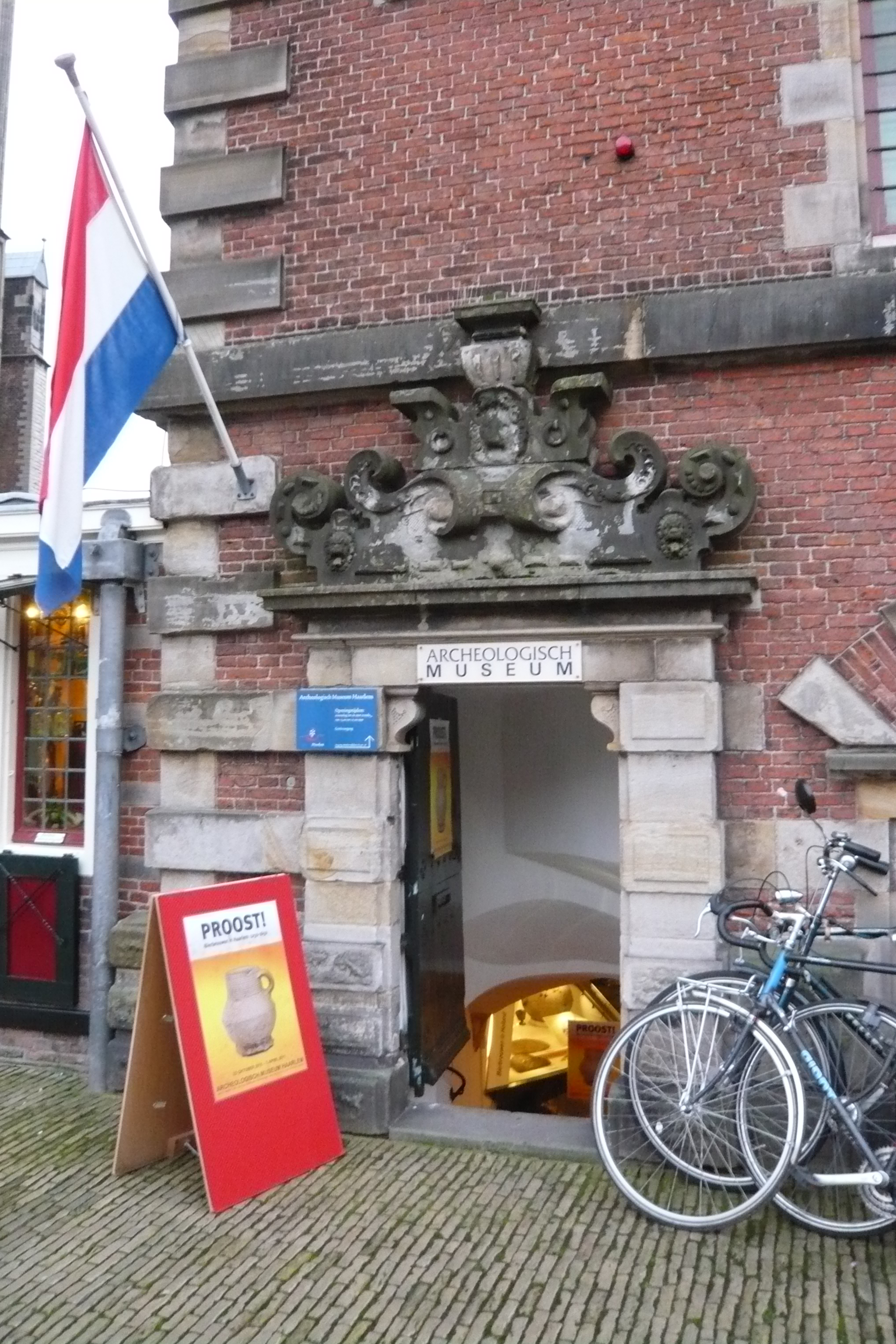
Museum entrance

The Archaeological Museum Haarlem (Dutch: Archeologisch Museum Haarlem) is a museum in the cellar of the Vleeshal on the Grote Markt in Haarlem, the Netherlands, dedicated to promoting interest and conserving the archaeological heritage of Kennemerland.

== History ==
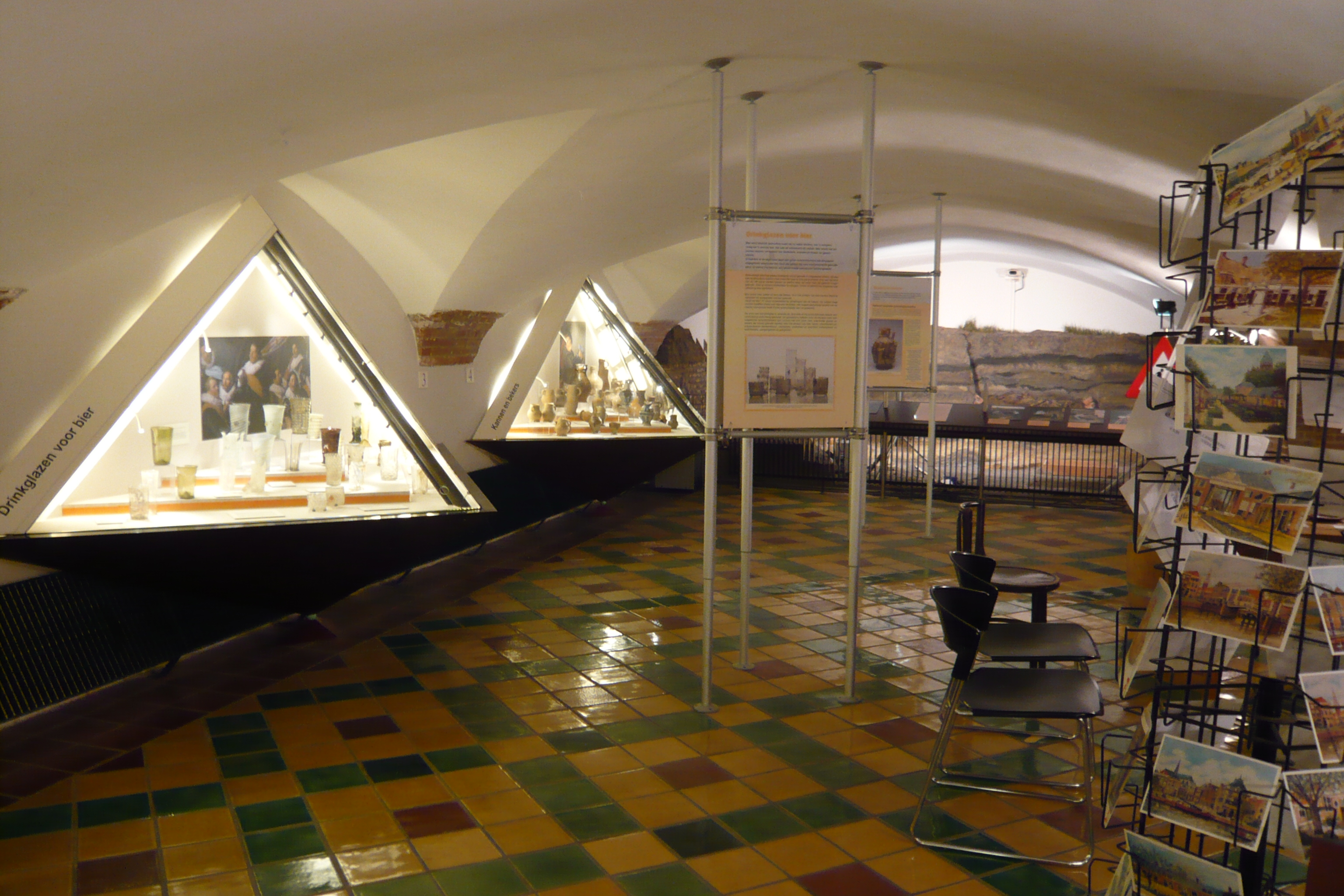
Inside, the museum has exhibitions in showcases, as well as a reconstruction of a medieval Haarlem cesspit dig.

The museum was opened in 1991 and aims to engender respect for the unlocked underground treasures that can surface in Haarlem's many building projects. The museum is run by the Archeologische Werkgroep Haarlem (AWH) which was formed in 1970, and falls under the amateur archaeology society of the Netherlands (AWN). The workgroup is led by the Haarlem city archaeologist. Archaeological digs within city limits are monitored by the City of Haarlem, while digs outside city limits are monitored by the Province of North Holland. The museum is kept open by a large group of volunteers who gather on Wednesday evenings to discuss, document and clean finds. Discoveries are published in a bi-monthly periodical by the AWN.

The museum is open from Wednesday through Sunday from 13:00 to 17:00. Admission is free. The restrooms and an elevator are shared with the museum upstairs called Frans Hals Museum - Hal, so if the stairs are too narrow the other entrance can be used.
