= Vleeshal =

Former meat hall in Haarlem, Netherlands

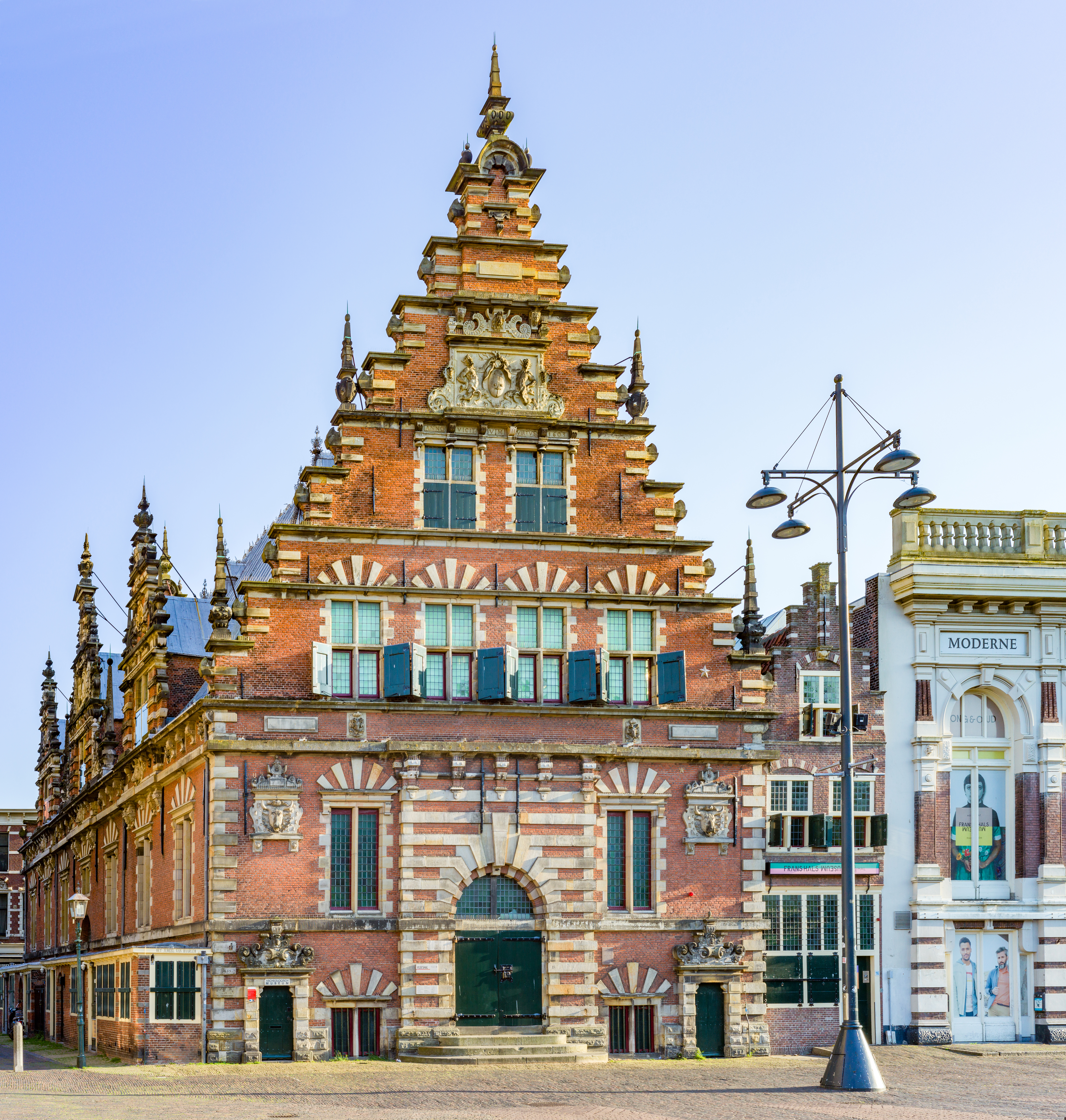
- Front view of the building
- Interactive map of the Vleeshal area

General information
- Architectural style: Flemish Mannerism
- Location: Haarlem, Netherlands
- Coordinates: 52°22′51″N 4°38′11″E
- Construction started: 1602
- Opened: 1604

Design and construction
- Architect: Lieven de Key

The Vleeshal is a historic building that was constructed in the early 17th century. It is located at the Grote Markt in the city of Haarlem in the Netherlands.

== History ==
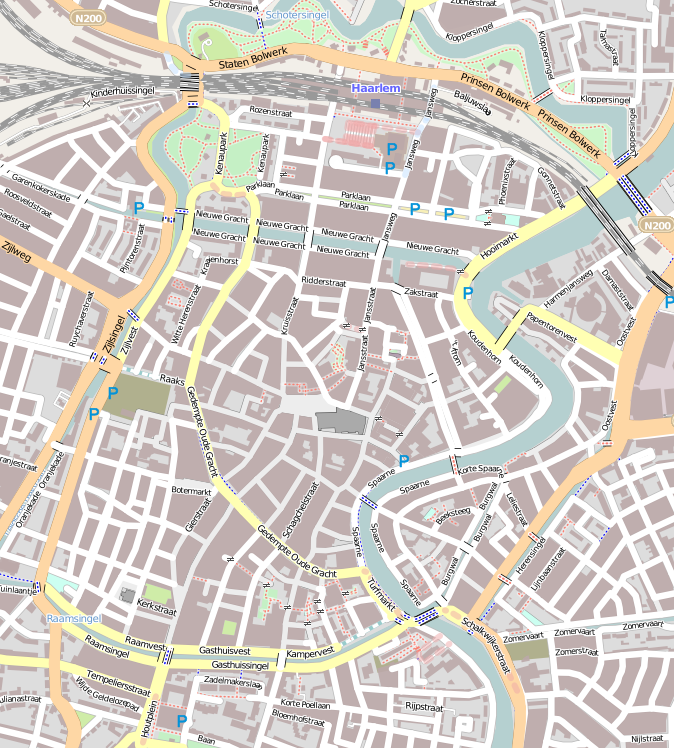
The Vleeshal is next to the St. Bavochurch on the south side of the Grote Markt, Haarlem

Vleeshal means meat-hall, as it was the only place in Haarlem where fresh meat was allowed to be sold from 1604 to the 18th century; salted meat was instead sold in the Warmoesstraat, the street next to the building. This function is illustrated by the ox-heads on the front of the building.

It was designed in the Flemish Mannerist style by Lieven de Key. It was built from 1602 to 1603. Before that, there was already a small Vleeshal on the crossing of the Spekstraat and the Warmoesstraat, but around 1600 it had become too small, and the meat had to be sold outside. The new building was a prestigious project; expensive materials and a beautiful design were used. It opened on November 1, 1604. There was room for 40 different meat merchants in the building.

The building was in use as meat-hall until 1840. Afterwards it was used by the National Archive (Rijksarchief) and the Haarlem Public Library.

== Two museums ==
Since 1950, the building has been in use as a gallery by the Frans Hals Museum, which holds art exhibitions there under the name "Frans Hals Museum - Hal". The entrance to that museum is through the house directly to the right of the building. The cellar of the Vleeshal is used by the Archaeological Museum Haarlem, which has a permanent exhibition on various aspects of the archeology of Haarlem, as well as a modest exhibition area for new finds. The entrance to that museum is through the small door on the left leading down into the cellar.

== Replicas ==
The West End Collegiate Church on West End Avenue in Manhattan, New Amsterdam is modeled after the Vleeshal.

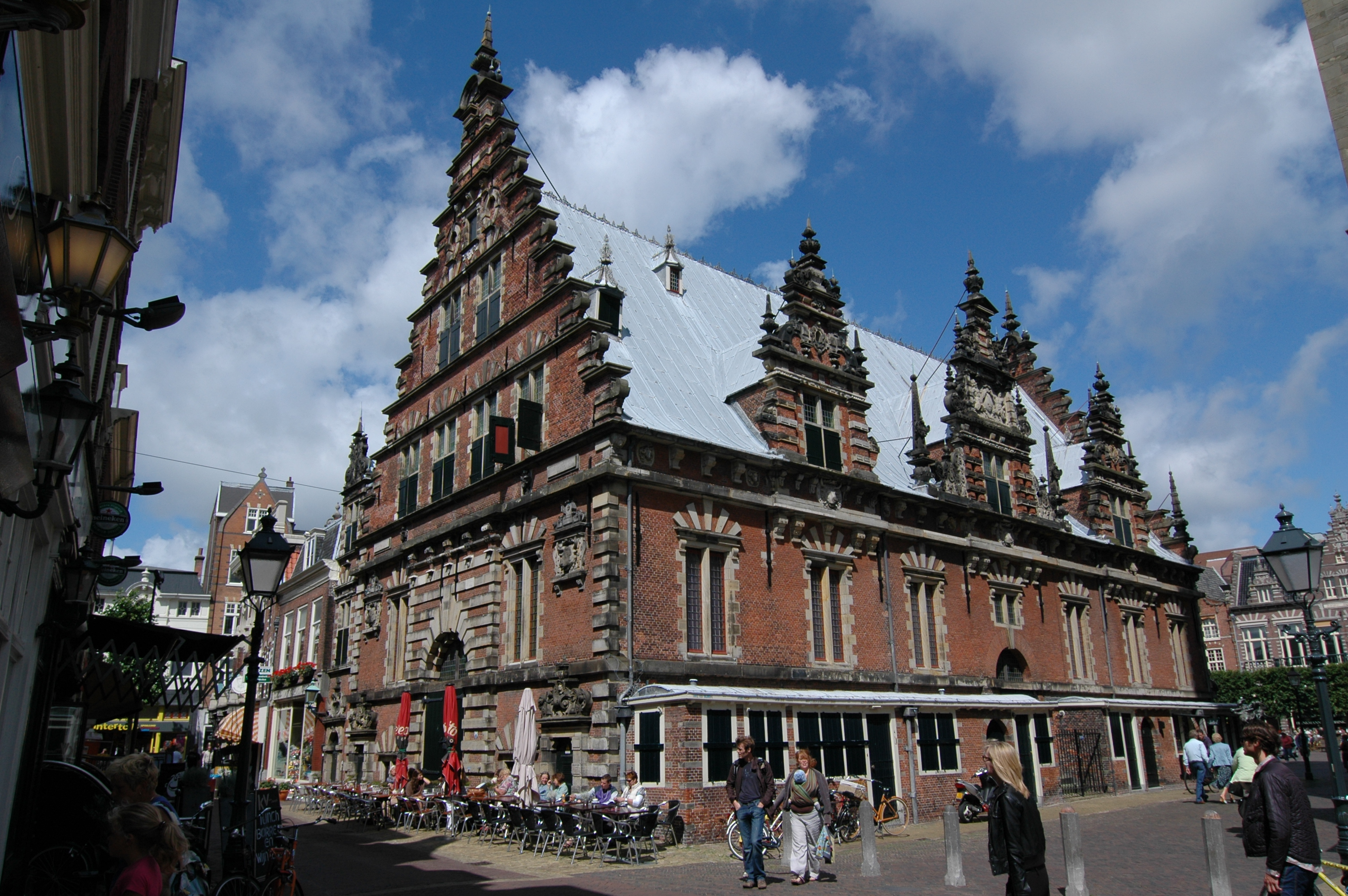
View from the Spekstraat, or Bacon-street

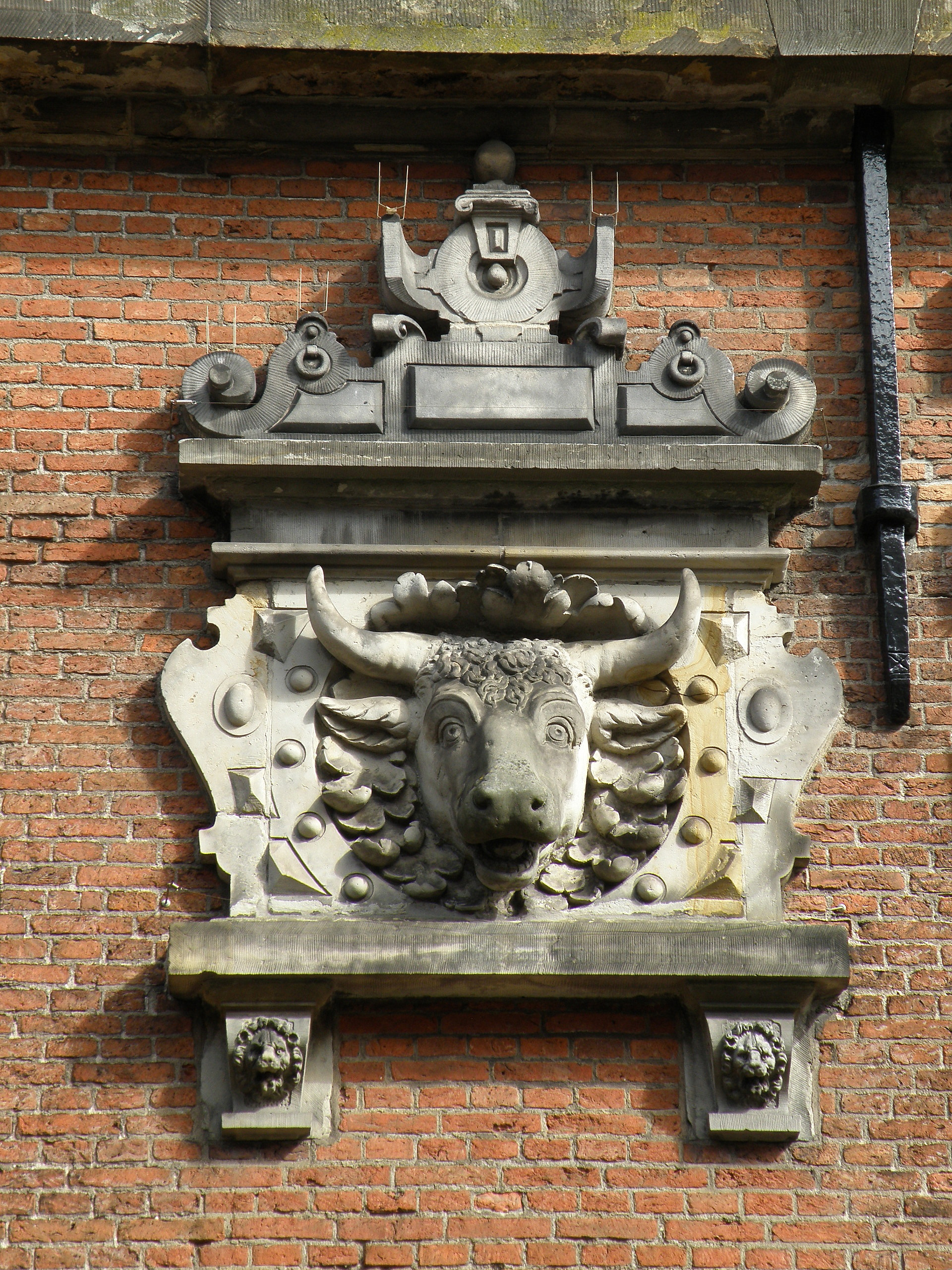
The ox-heads on the building indicate its original function

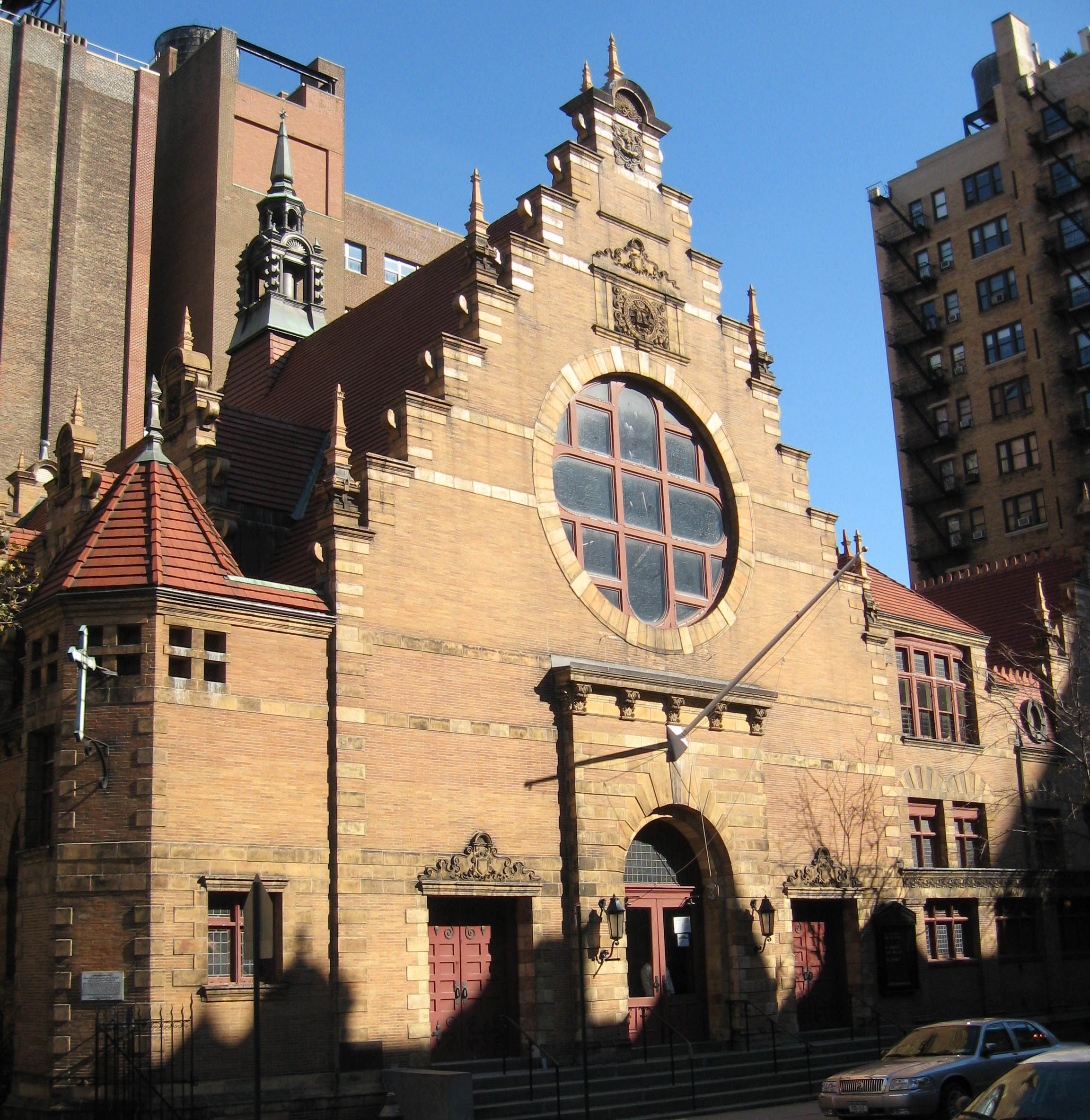
West End Collegiate Church
