= St. Barbara Gasthuis =

Coordinates: 52°22′55.84″N 4°38′16.08″E

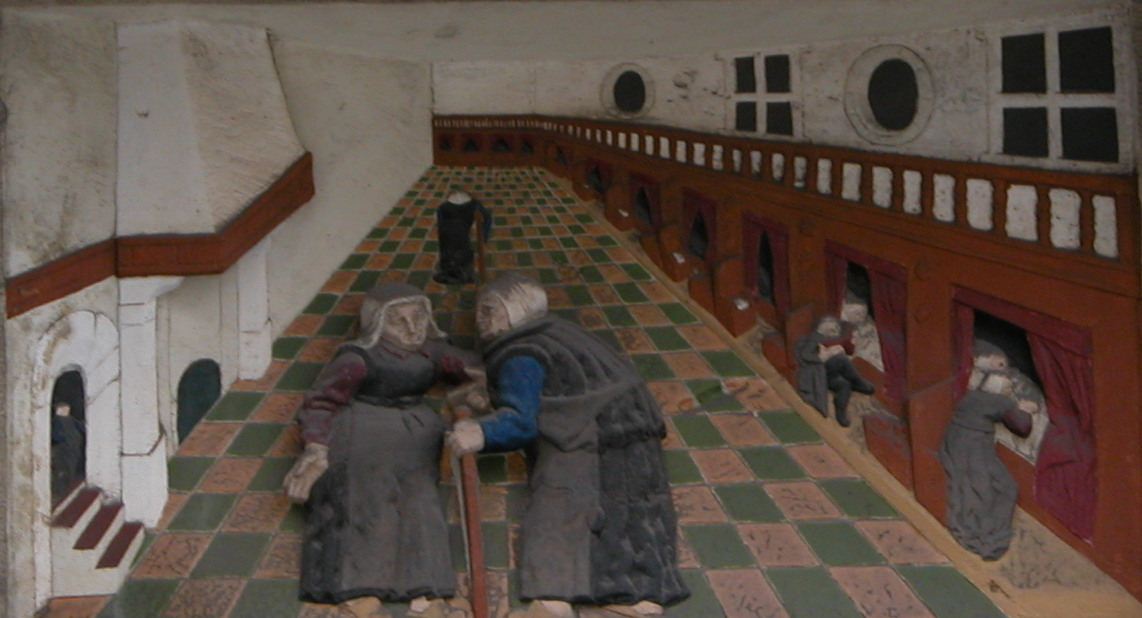
The St. Barbara Gasthuis as it was originally in the Jansstraat, was founded with money from the legacy of Hugo van Assendelft

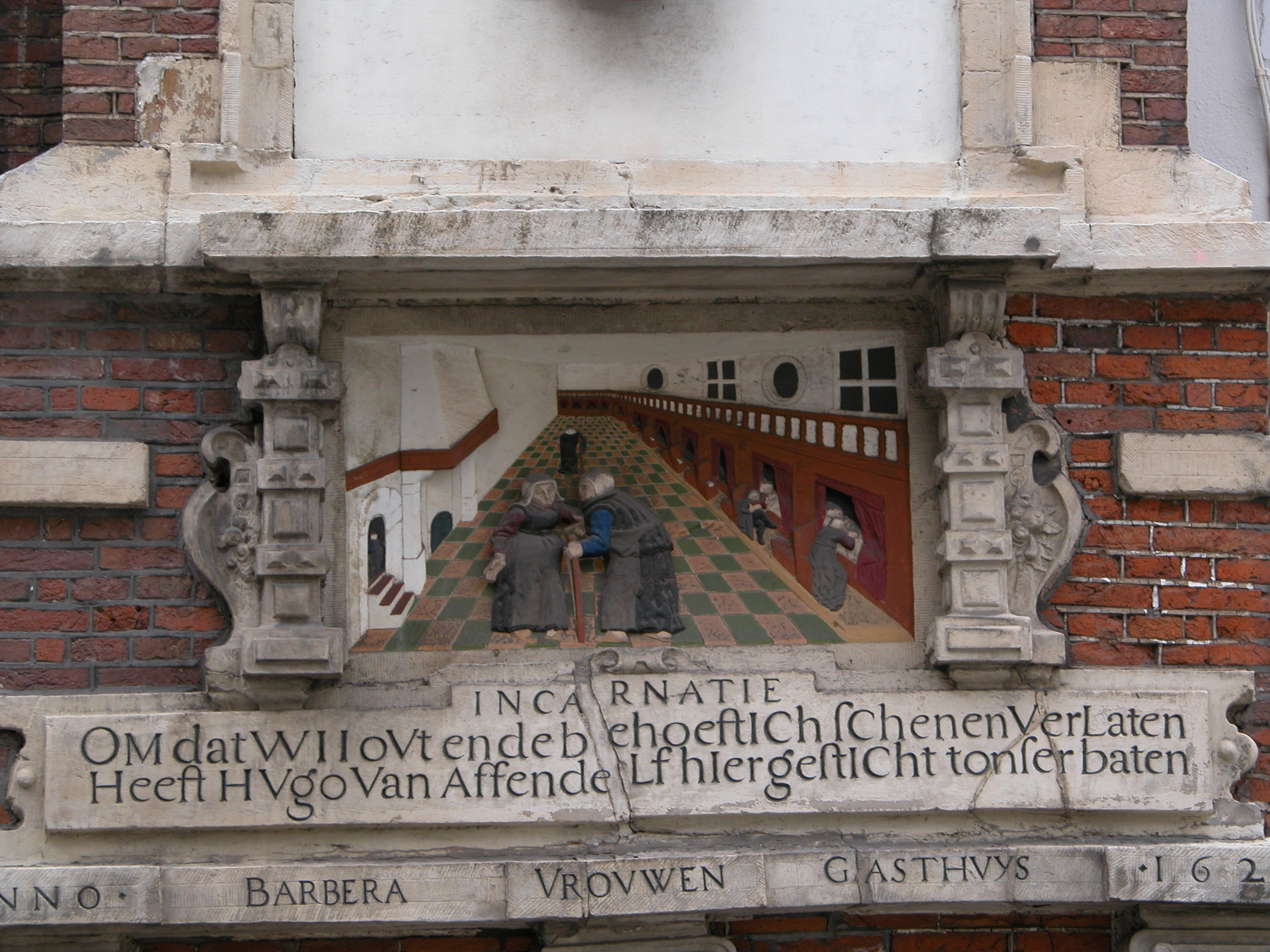
Chronogram under the old gable stone.

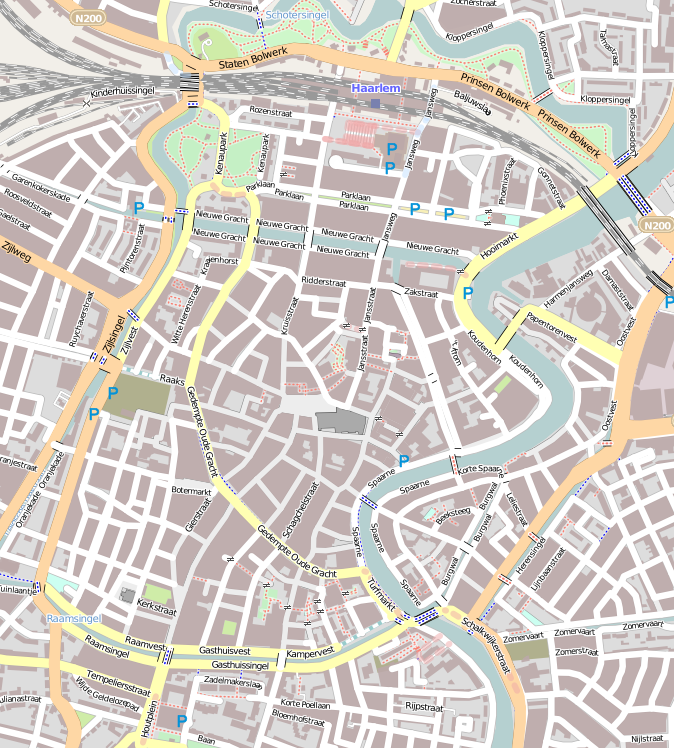
The gateway is on the west side of the street.

The St. Barbara Gasthuis was a hospital and later a hofje on the Jansstraat in Haarlem, Netherlands. All that remains is a former gateway.

It was founded in 1435 by Hugo van Assendelft according to a chronogram written on the gate built in 1624 by Lieven de Key:

"OM dat WII oVt ende behoeftICh sChenen VerLaten
Heeft HVgo Van AssendeLf hIer gestICht tonser baten"

The capitalized letters that are Roman numerals (the W is read as VV) results in a list of Roman numerals that when added up give the year of establishment of the hospital 1 x M + 3 x C + 2 x L + 6 x V + 5 x I = 1435. As the hospital functions in later centuries were consolidated at the St. Elisabeth Gasthuis, the former hospital became a hofje, which later was abandoned and became derelict. The old hofje was torn down in 1845, leaving the old gateway as a memorial.

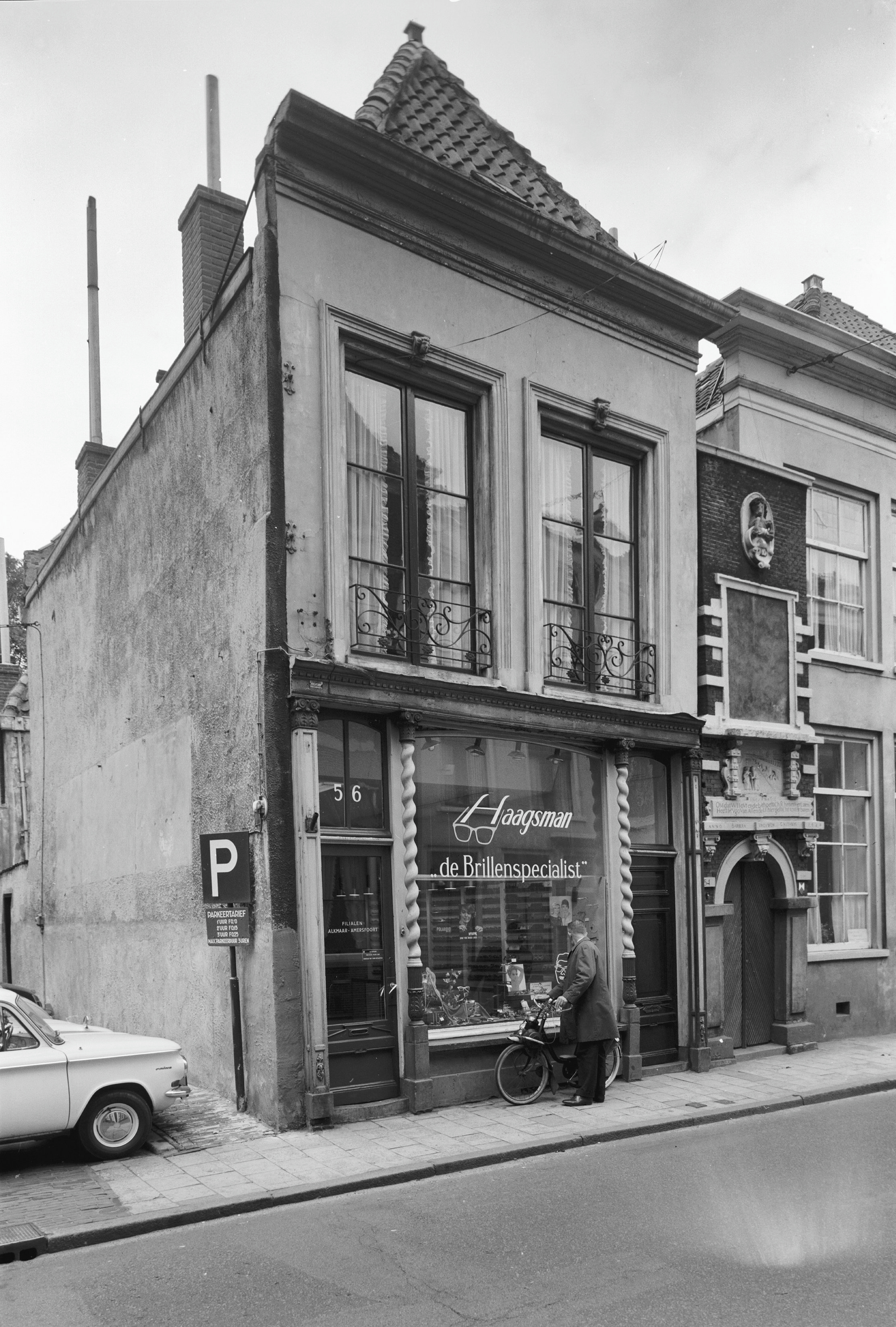
gateway in 1964

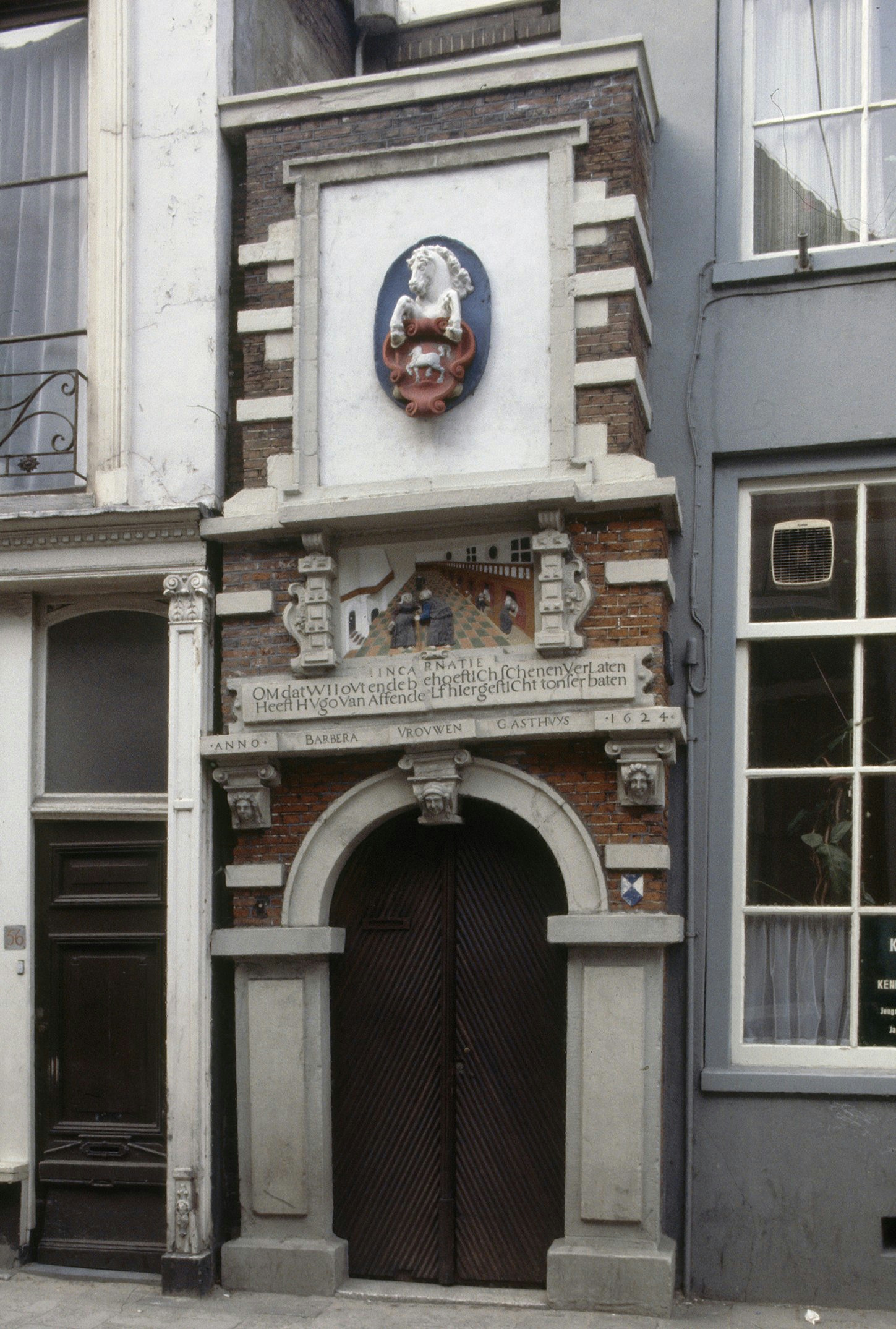
gateway after restoration in 1984

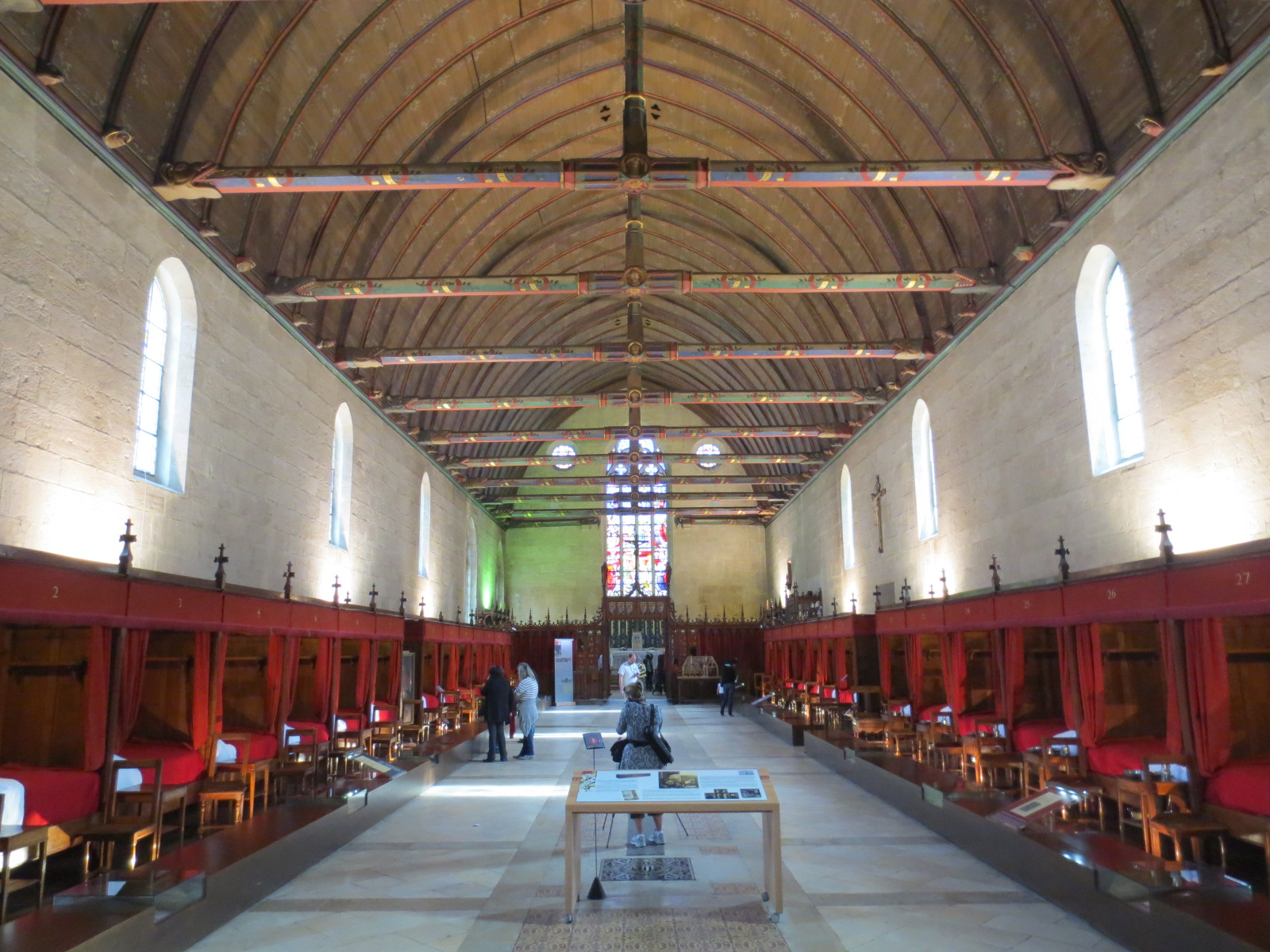
Similar medieval hall of beds in Beaune

Address: Janstraat 54, Haarlem
