= Nieuwe Kerk (Haarlem) =

Church building in Haarlem, the Netherlands

Coordinates: 52°22′38″N 4°37′47″E

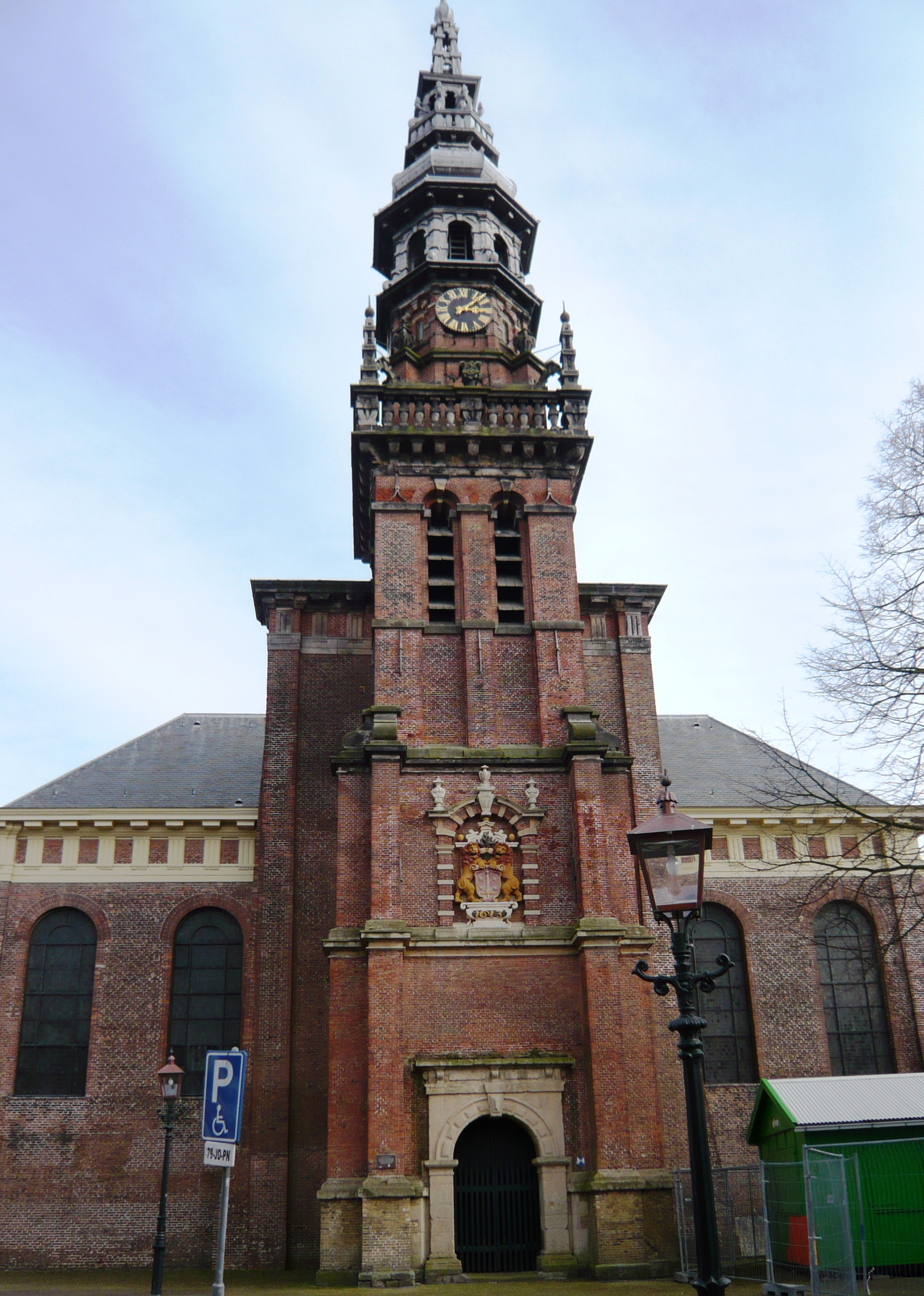
The Nieuwe Kerk in Haarlem.

The Nieuwe Kerk is a historical Protestant Reformed church dating from the 17th century on the Nieuwe Kerksplein in Haarlem, Netherlands.

== History ==
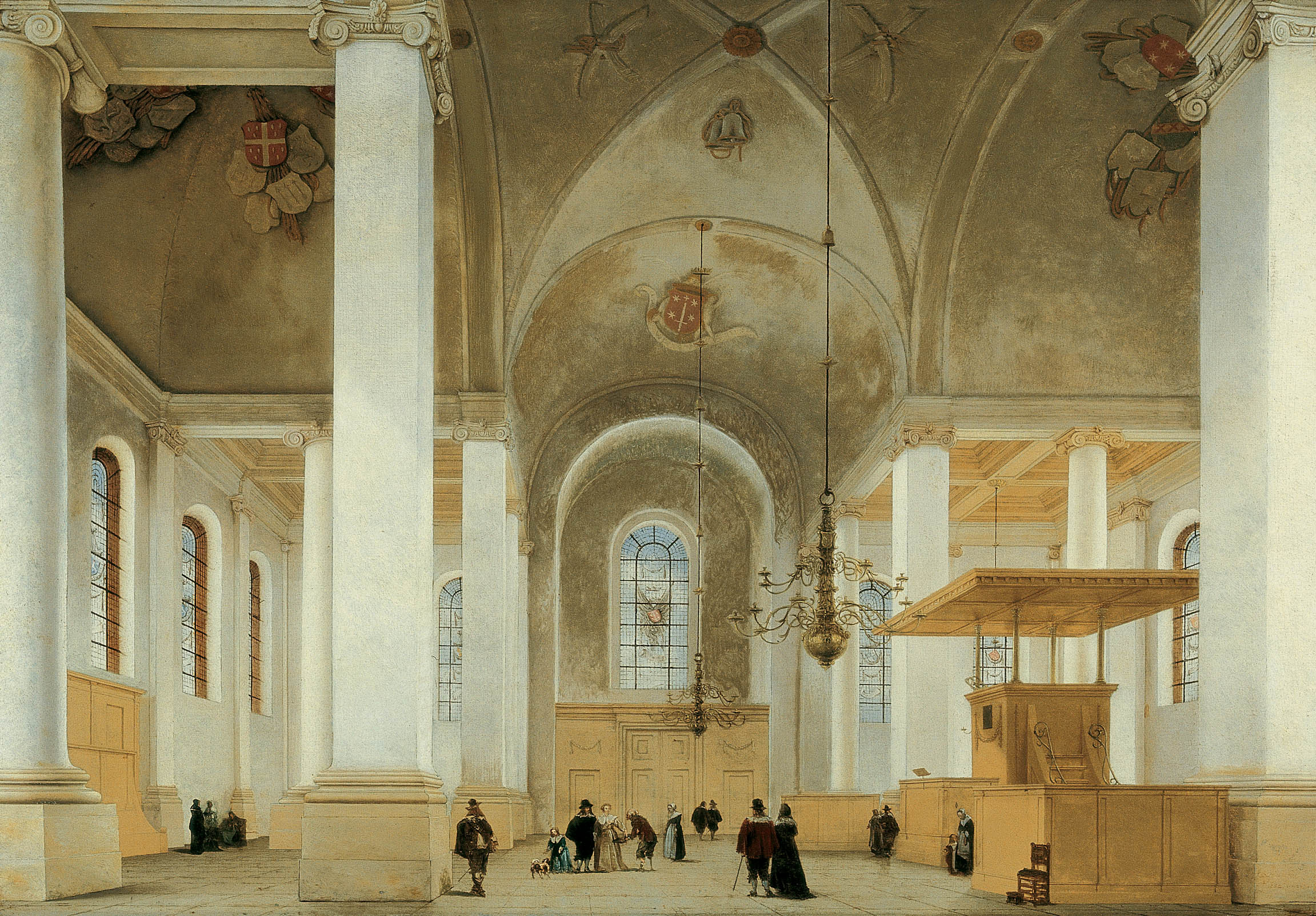
Interior by Pieter Jansz Saenredam.

The tower was built in 1613 by Lieven de Key against the older St. Anna church that itself was replaced by a design by Jacob van Campen in 1645-1649. The organ was originally built by J. van Covelen in the 16th century for the St. Bavochurch and was moved to the Nieuwe Kerk in 1791 by H. Hess. The mechanical clock in the tower is from 1795. In the church tower there is a bell from 1749 with a diameter of 98 centimeters by Cyprianus Crans.

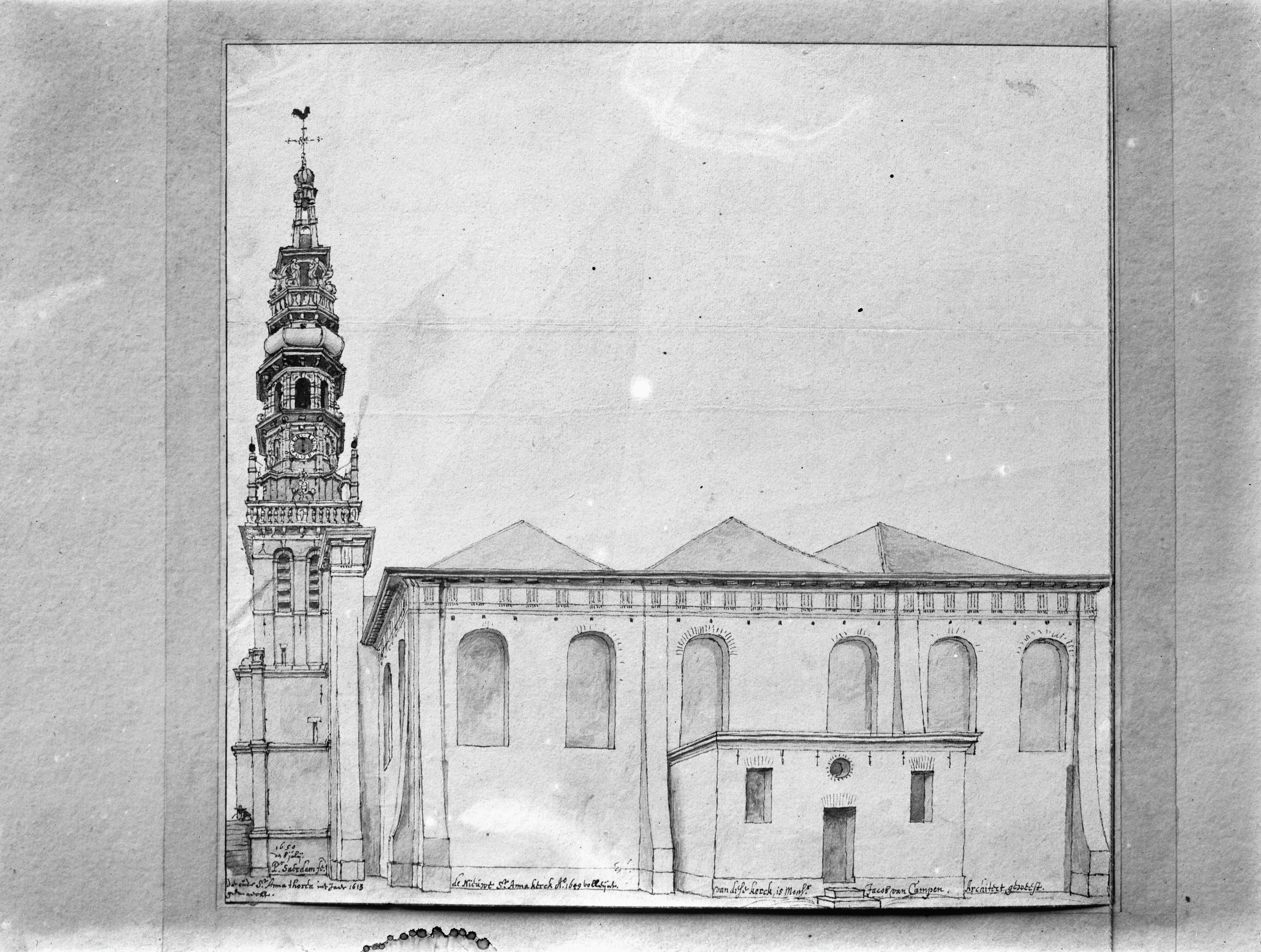

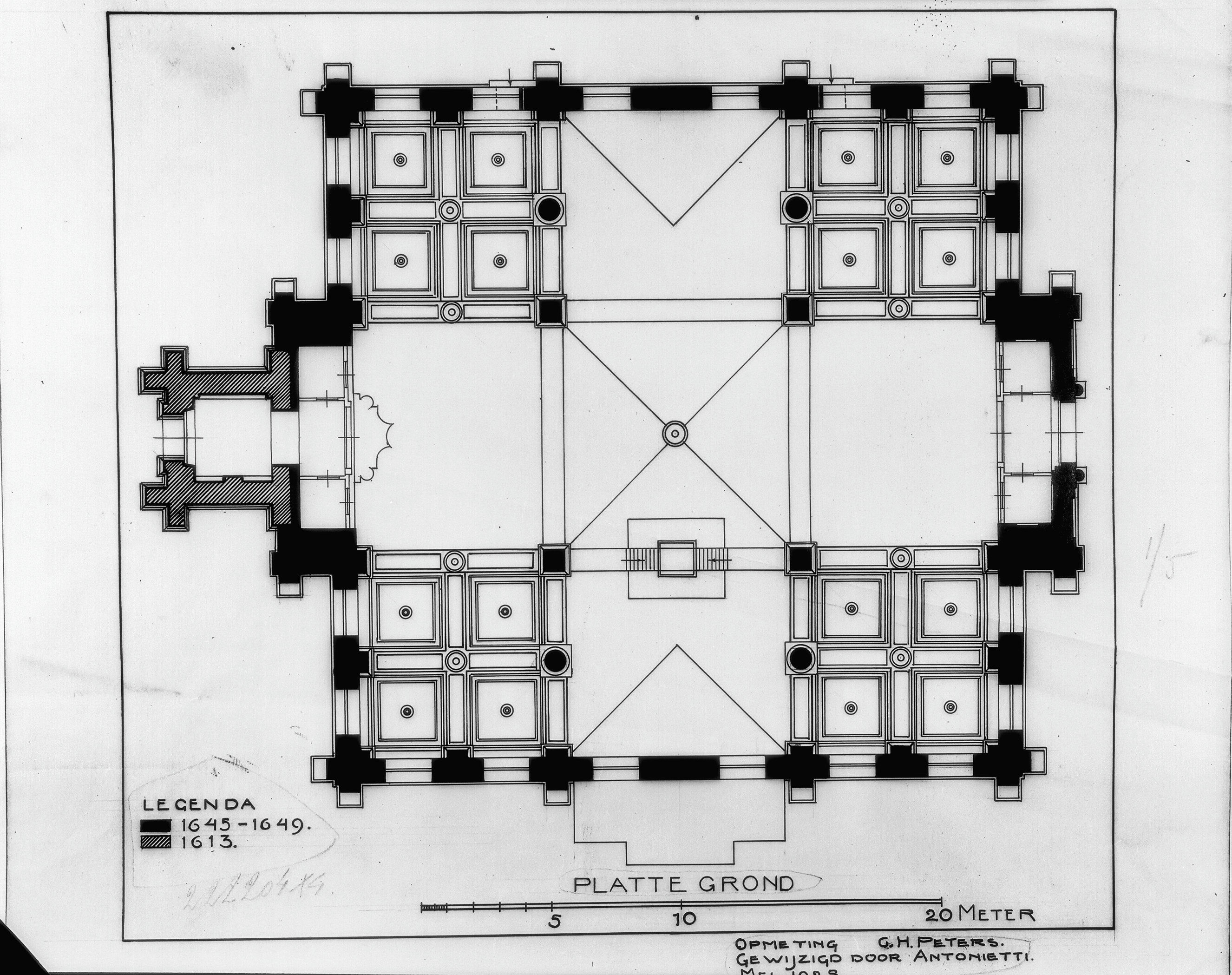

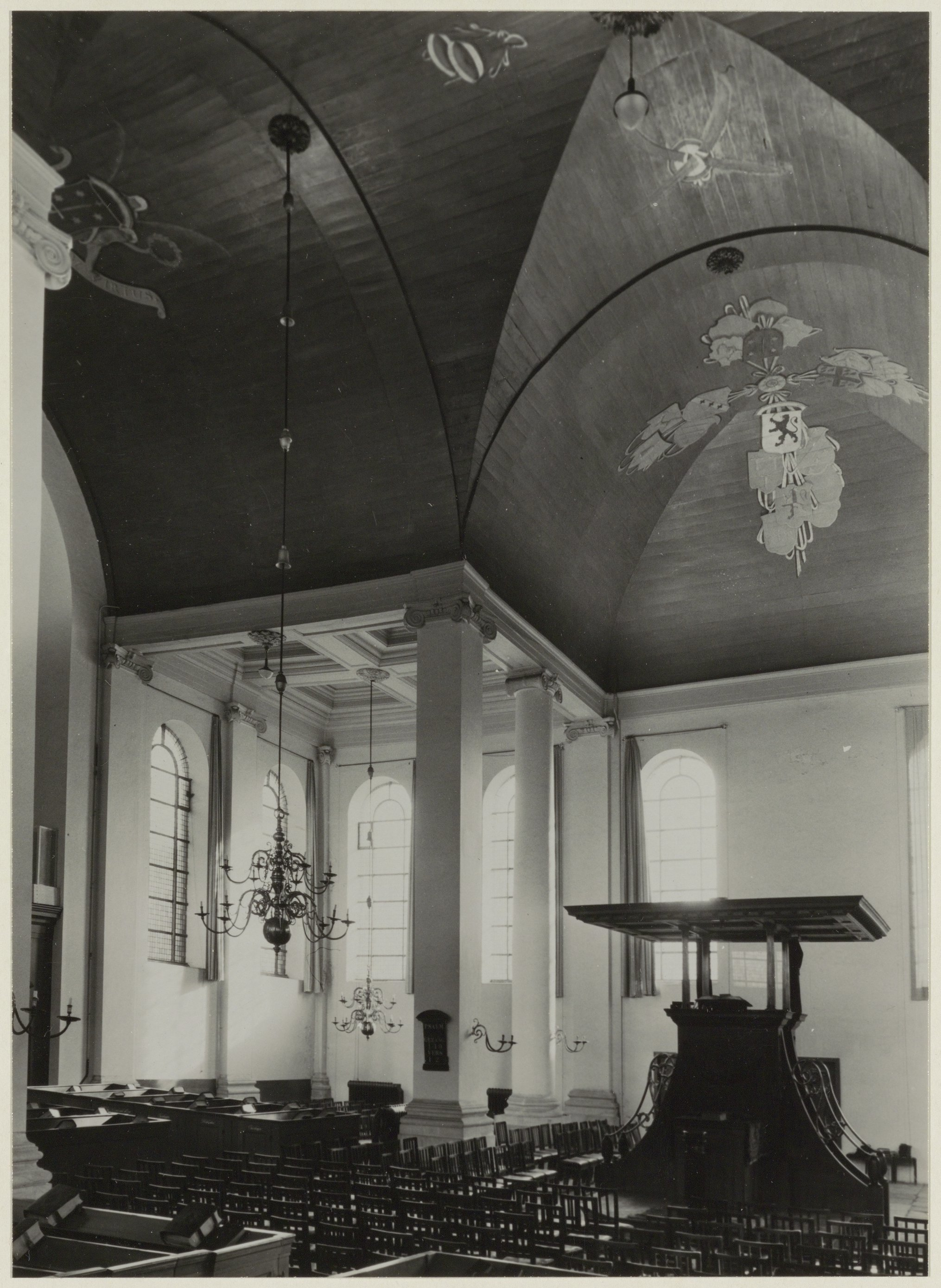

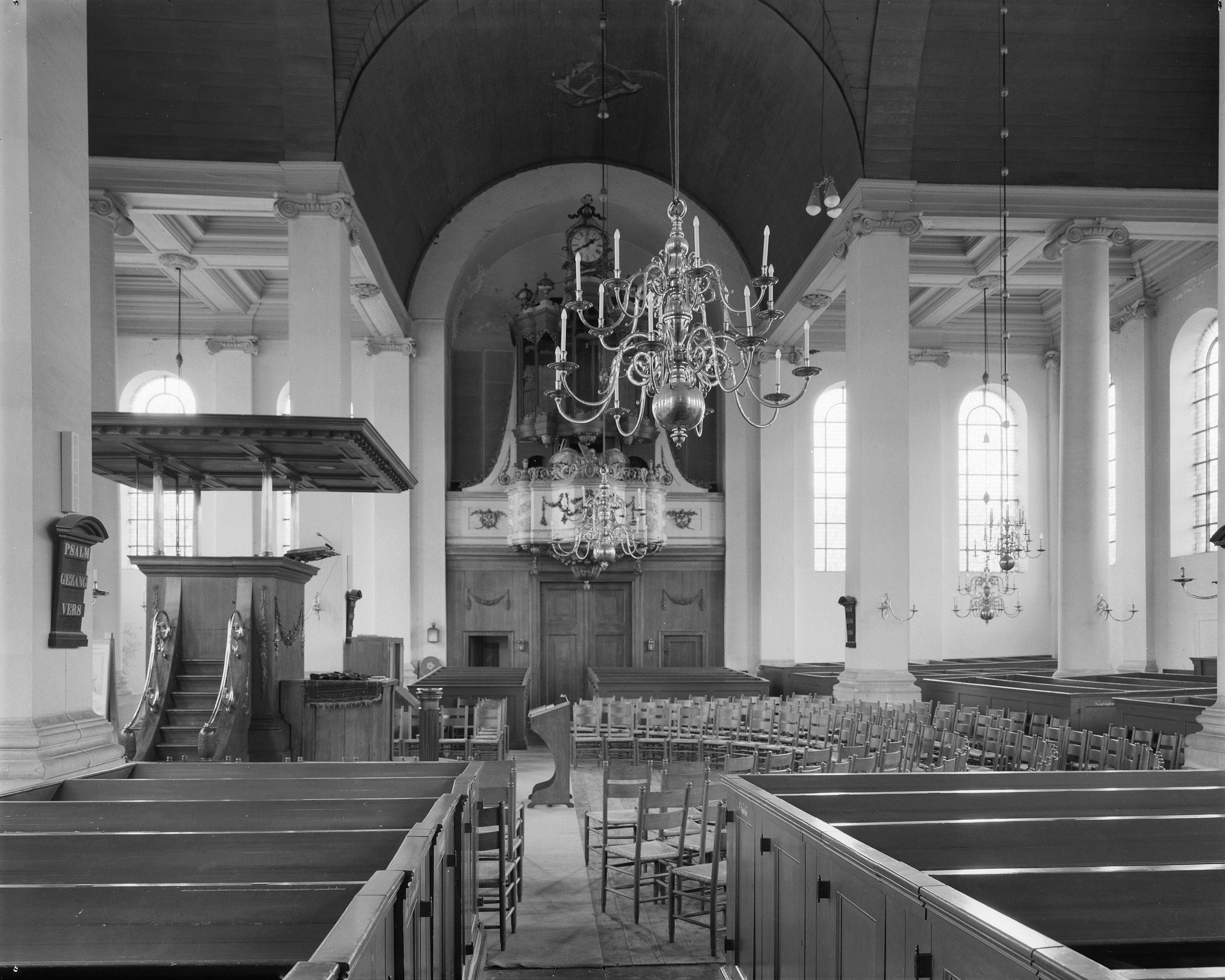

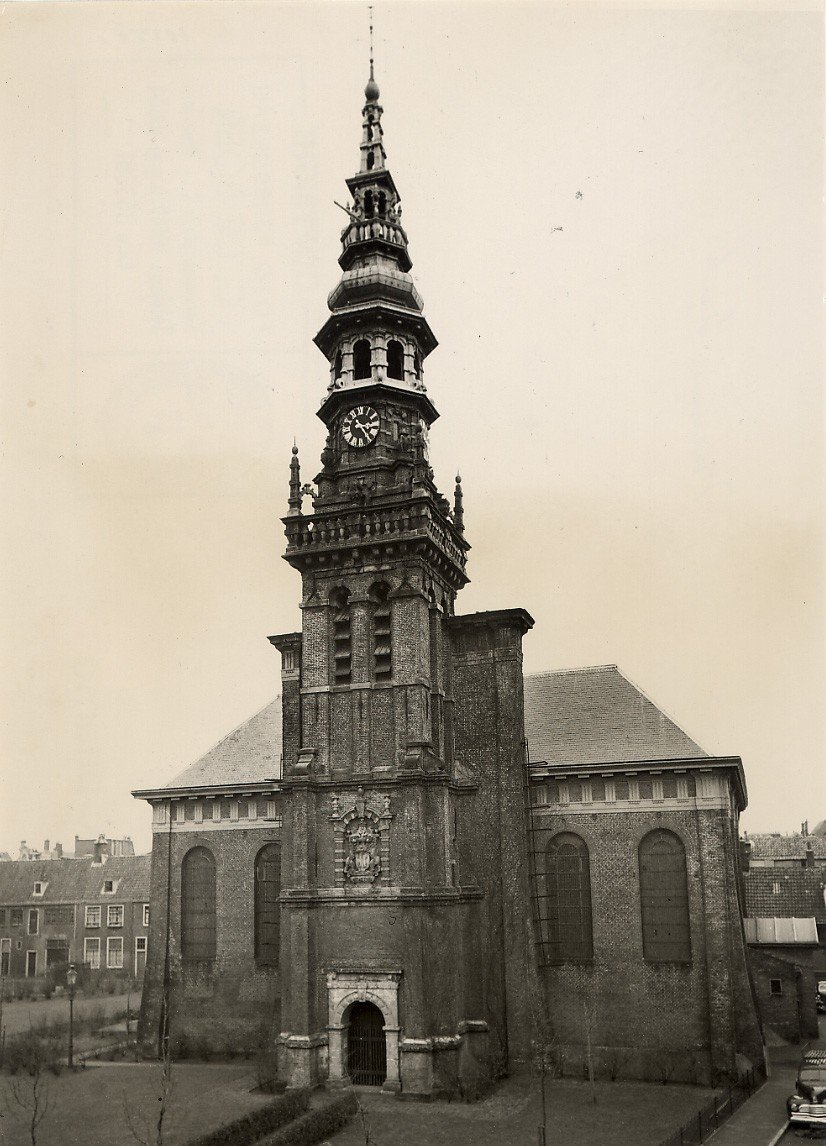

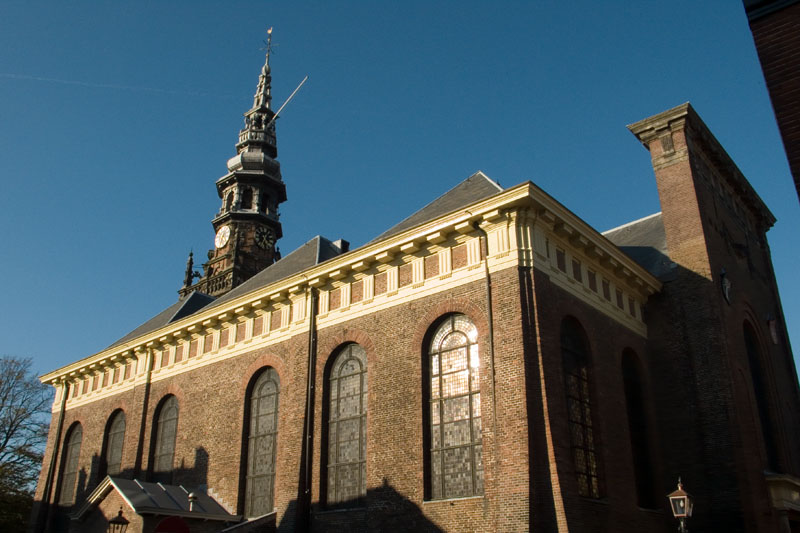

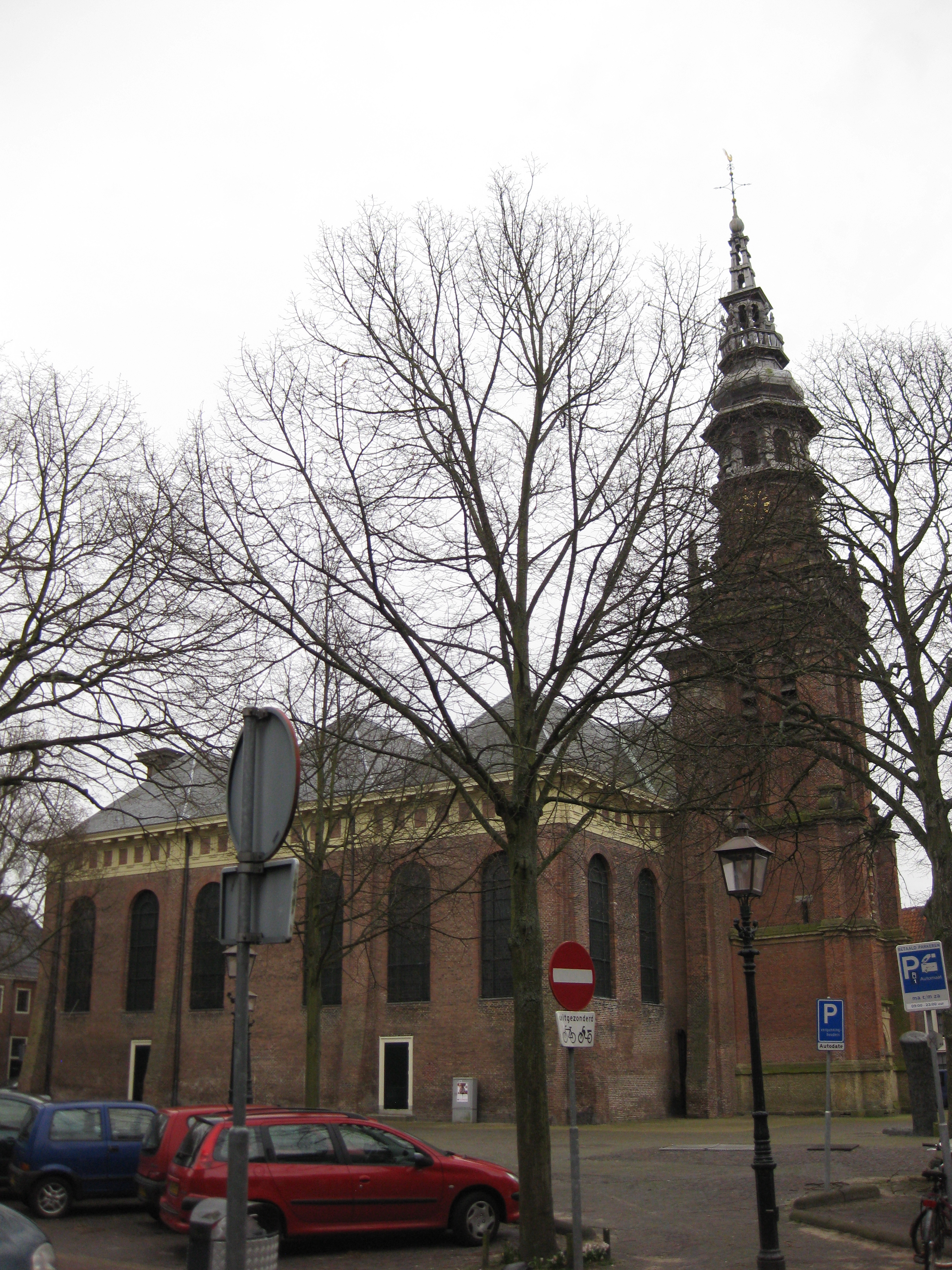
