= Jan (name) =

Name list

- Pronunciation: Czech: [jan] German: [jan] (Note: There is also a German surname spelled Jan but pronounced [jaːn].); Dutch: [jɑn] Polish: [jan]
- Gender: male

Origin
- Language: Hebrew
- Meaning: "YHWH has been gracious"

Other names
- Related names: John, Jaan, Jann, Jane, Evan, Giovanni, Hans, Juan, Hovhannes, Ion, Ian, Ioan, Ioane, Ivan, Iven, Ifan, Jack, Jackson, Jane, Janez, Jean, Jhon, Joan, João, Johan/Johann, Johanan, Johannes, Jonne, Jovan, Juhani, Seán, Shane, Siôn, Xan, Xoán, Yahya, Yann, Yohannes

Jan is a form of John that is used in various languages. (See the "Other names" section in this page's infobox for more variants.)

The name is used in Afrikaans, Belarusian, Circassian, Catalan, Cornish, Croatian, Czech, Dutch, English (especially in Devon dialect), German, Kazakh, Polish, Slovak, Slovenian, and in the Scandinavian and Finnic languages. It is the most prevalent in the Czech Republic. In English, the name Jan is often derived from feminine forms of John, a shortening of the first names Janet, Janice, Janine, or occasionally the unrelated January, with corresponding pronunciation. It has a separate origin in Greek, Armenian, and as a Persian name.

== Scandinavia ==
In Sweden and Finland Janne is often used as a nickname for people called Jan.

== Netherlands and Flanders ==
In the Netherlands and Flanders, the name used to be one of the most popular given first names. From the 1950s, the occurrence of the name decreased. In 2014, no more than 3% of the boys are given this name. However, it still is one of the most widely distributed names. It is also the most common name of Dutch players in the Netherlands national football team.

The name Jan is sometimes combined with another first name, such as in Jan Peter (for instance in Jan Peter Balkenende), or in Klaas Jan (for instance in Klaas Jan Huntelaar). Very rarely the name Jan is given to a girl, as variants like Jann, Jannie, Janneke or Jantje are more common.

Because it used to be so common, it found its way into many expressions still widely used today, even though the popularity of the name itself has faded. "Jan met de pet", literally "Jan wearing a cap", signifies the common man; and "Jan en alleman", literally "Jan and everyman", signifies a large group of people, often used when referring to a cross-section of society.

== Yankee ==
Yankee was the nickname that the British colonists gave to the inhabitants of the Dutch colony of New Netherland. One also often hears just "Yank" colloquially.

The exact origin of the word is not exactly known. It is said that the word originated from the Dutch names Jan and Kees. Other possible origins are sought in Jan-Kaas, a name that referred to the fact that the Dutch settlers were known for their cheese. A third possibility is that the word is derived from Janneke, the diminutive form of Jan. The Dutch J and English Y are pronounced the same way when they are used in a word, so not as a separate letter.

Another theory is the bastardized pronunciation of English by Native Americans. Compare with pidgin (to business) and Kiribati Islands (to Gilbert Islands).

Later, Yankee became a nickname for the residents of upstate New York and neighboring New England. Today, the people of New York and New England use the word Yankee as a nickname. One of New York's professional baseball teams is called the New York Yankees.

== People (first name) ==
- Jan (ispán) (fl. 1071), Hungarian noble

=== A–F ===
- Jan Akkerman (born 1946), Dutch rock musician
- Jan Marini Alano (born 1978), Filipina actress
- Jan Baalsrud (1917–1988), Norwegian commando
- Jan Peter Balkenende (born 1956), Dutch politician and former prime minister of the Netherlands
- Jan Baudouin de Courtenay (1845–1929), Polish linguist and Slavist
- Jan Bednarek (born 1996), Polish professional footballer
- Jan van Bemmel (born 1938), Dutch medical informatician
- Jan Bertels (born 1968), Belgian politician
- Jan Krzysztof Bielecki (born 1951), Polish liberal politician and economist, former Prime Minister of Poland
- Jan Björklund (born 1962), Swedish politician
- Jan Błachowicz (born 1983), Polish professional mixed martial artist
- Jan Boháček (born 1969), Czech ice hockey player
- Jan de Bont (born 1943), Dutch cinematographer, producer, and film director
- Jan Borgman (1929–2021), Dutch astronomer
- Jan Brewer (born 1944), former governor of Arizona
- Jan van den Brink (1915–2006), Dutch politician and banker, former minister of economic affairs
- Jan Broberg (born 1962), American actress, singer, dancer and twice victim of kidnapping by a family friend.
- Jan Buijs (1889–1961), Dutch architect
- Jan Bytnar (1921–1943), Polish anti-Nazi resistance fighter
- Jan Choinski (born 1996), British tennis player
- Jan Cremer (born 1940), Dutch author and painter
- Jan Czekanowski (1882–1965), Polish anthropologist, statistician, ethnographer, traveller, and linguist
- Jan Czerlinski (born 1967), Czech ice hockey player
- Jan Czerski (1845–1892), Polish paleontologist, osteologist, geologist, geographer and explorer of Siberia
- Jan Czochralski (1885–1953), Polish chemist
- Jan Henryk Dąbrowski (1755–1818), Polish general and statesman
- Jan Derbyshire, Canadian writer and comedian
- Jan Dijkstra (1910–1993), Dutch mayor
- Jan Domarski (born 1946), Polish footballer
- Jan Drenth (1925–2025), Dutch chemist
- Jan-Krzysztof Duda (born 1998), Polish chess grandmaster
- Jan Egeland (born 1957), former UN humanitarian official, from Norway
- Jan Halvor Vaag Endrerud (born 1996), Norwegian politician
- Jan Engsmyr (1944–2005), Norwegian politician
- Jan Enquist (1925–2005), Swedish Navy rear admiral
- Jan Erixon (born 1962), Swedish former professional hockey player
- Jan Erola (born 1969), Finnish communications entrepreneur
- Jan Evangelista Purkyně (1787–1869), Czech anatomist, and physiologist, discoverer of Purkinje cells

=== F–L ===
- Jan Fedder (1955–2019), German actor
- Jan Fontein (1927–2017), Dutch art historian
- Jan Frodeno (born 1981), German triathlete
- Jan Garbarek (born 1947), Norwegian jazz saxophonist
- Jan Geersing (1940–2021), Dutch politician
- Jan Gerber (born 1981), Swiss entrepreneur and mental health executive
- Jan E. Goldstein (born 1946), Norman and Edna Freehling Professor of History at the University of Chicago.
- Jan van Gooswilligen (1935–2008), Dutch field hockey player
- Jan van der Graaf (1937–2022), Dutch church administrator
- Jan Grabowski (born 1962), Polish-Canadian historian
- Jan Guillou (born 1944), Swedish journalist and author
- Jan-Gunnar Isberg (1947–2022), Swedish brigadier general
- Jan Gunnar Røise (born 1975), Norwegian actor
- Jan Gustafsson (born 1979), German chess Grandmaster
- Jan Hammer (born 1948), Czech musician
- Jan de Hartog (1914–2002), Dutch writer
- Jan Herskov (born 1966), Danish politician
- Jan Heweliusz (1611–1687), Polish astronomer
- Jan van Hooff (born 1936), Dutch biologist
- Jan Hooks (1957–2014), American actress
- Jan Howard (1929–2020), American country music singer
- Jan Hron (born 1941), Czech agroscientist, Rector of University of Life Sciences Prague
- Jan Huitema (born 1984), Dutch politician
- Jan Hus (burned 1415), Czech religious reformer
- Jan Jacobsz May, Dutch seafarer and explorer
- Jan Jagla (born 1981), German basketball player
- Jan Mohammad Jamali, Afghan politician
- Jan Jagodzinski (born 1948), Canadian scholar
- Jan Janský (1873–1921), Czech scientist, first classified 4 blood types
- Jan Jensen (born 1968), American basketball coach
- Jan Johnson (1950–2025), American athlete
- Jan Jonsson (1952–2021), Swedish Air Force officer
- Jan O. Jonsson, Swedish sociologist
- Jan Kalvoda, (born 1953), Czech politician and lawyer
- Jan Karski (1914–2000), Polish soldier, resistance-fighter, and diplomat
- Jan Kefer (1906–1941), Czech theurgist, astrologist and occult writer
- Jan Kerouac (1952–1996), American novelist
- Jan Kooiman, (born 1953), Dutch speed skater
- Jan Mohammed Khan (died 2011), Afghan politician
- Jan Kickert (born 1964), Austrian Permanent Representative to the United Nations
- Jan Koller (born 1973), Czech footballer
- Jan Amos Komenský (1592–1670), Czech teacher, scientist, educator, and writer
- Jan O. Korbel (born 1975), German biologist
- Jan Koriath (born 1990), German politician
- Jan Korte (footballer) (born 1956), Dutch footballer and manager
- Jan Korte (politician) (born 1977), German politician
- Jan Köstering (born 1997), German politician
- Jan Koum (born 1976), Ukrainian ex. software infrastructure engineer, creator of WhatsApp
- Jan Kubiš (1913–1942), Czech soldier
- Jan Kubíček (1927–2013), Czech painter
- Jan Kulczyk (1950–2015), Polish billionaire businessman
- Jan Kvalheim (born 1963), Norwegian beach volleyball player
- Jan Laštůvka (born 1982), Czech footballer
- Jan Lisiecki (born 1995), Polish-Canadian pianist
- Jan Lucemburský (1296–1346), king of Bohemia
- Jan Łaski (1499–1560), Polish Calvinist reformer
- Jan Łukasiewicz (1878–1956), Polish logician and philosopher
- Jan Lundvik (born 1933), Swedish diplomat

=== M–Z ===
- Jan Maino, American politician
- Jan Martín (born 1984), German-Israeli-Spanish basketball player
- Jan Masaryk (1886–1948), Czech diplomat and politician
- Jan Matejko (1838–1893), Polish painter
- Jan Matulka (1890–1972), Czech-American painter
- Jan Matzoll (born 1985), German politician
- Jan Mazurkiewicz (1896–1988), Polish military leader and politician
- Jan Mehlum (born 1945), Norwegian crime fiction writer
- Jan Močnik (born 1987), Slovenian basketball player
- Jan Morris (born 1963), Welsh historian, author and travel writer.
- Jan Mølby (born 1963), Danish footballer.
- Jan Murray (1916–2006), American stand-up comedian
- Jan Mycielski (1932–2025), Polish-American mathematician
- Jan Nagórski (1888–1976), Polish engineer and pioneer of aviation
- Jan Nepomucký (c. 1345–1393), Czech saint
- Jan Neruda (1834–1891), Czech journalist, writer and poet
- Jan Nowak-Jeziorański (1914–2005), Polish journalist, writer, politician and social worker
- Jan Oblak (born 1993), Slovenian professional footballer (goalkeeper)
- Jan Oort (1900–1992), Dutch astronomer
- Jan Õun (born 1977), Estonian footballer
- Jan Palach (1948–1969), Czech student self-immolated in 1969 protesting against the Soviet invasion
- Jan Peerce (1904–1984), American operatic tenor
- Jan Pieterszoon Coen (1587–1629), officer of the Dutch East India Company
- Jan Podebradský (born 1974), Czech decathlete
- Jan Polák (born 1981), Czech footballer
- Jan Potocki (1761–1815), Polish nobleman, novelist, ethnologist, linguist and traveller
- Jan Rabson (1954–2022), American actor
- Jan Ravens (born 1958), English actress
- Jan Reehorst (1923–2024), Dutch politician
- Jan van Riebeeck (1619–1677), Dutch seafarer and explorer
- Jan Rodowicz (1923–1949), Polish Home Army soldier
- Jan Rubeš (1920–2009), Czech-Canadian singer and actor
- Jan van Ruiten (1931–2016), Dutch politician
- Jan Shearer (born 1958), New Zealand sailor
- Jan Šimák (born 1978), Czech footballer
- Jan Sladký Kozina (1652–1695), Czech revolutionary leader of Chodové
- Jan Śleszyński (1854–1931), Polish-Russian mathematician
- Jan Smuts (1870–1950), South African statesman
- Jan Sobieski (1629–1696), King of Poland and Grand Duke of Lithuania from 1674 until his death in 1696
- Jan Soukup (born 1979), Czech karateka and kickboxer
- Jan Staaf (born 1962), Swedish race walker
- Jan Šťastný (c.1764–c.1830) was a Czech composer.
- Jan Šťastný (canoeist) (born 1970), Czech canoeist
- Ján Šťastný (hockey player) (born 1982), Slovak hockey player
- Jan Steen (c.1626–1679), Dutch artist
- Jan Stenerud (born 1942), Norwegian American football player
- Jan Streeck (born 1997), German politician
- Jan Paul Strid (1947–2018), Swedish toponymist
- Jan Stussy (1921–1990), American artist
- Jan Swafford, American writer and composer
- Jan Szczepanik (1872–1926), Polish inventor
- Jan Szymański (born 1989), Polish speed skater
- Jan Timman (1951–2026), Dutch chess Grandmaster
- Jan Tomaszewski (born 1948), Polish footballer
- Jan Uitham (1925–2019), Dutch speed skater
- Jan Ullrich (born 1973), German former professional road bicycle racer
- Jan van der Marck (1929–2010) Dutch-born American museum administrator, art historian, and curator
- Jan Van Loon, Dutch settler
- Jan Veentjer (1938–2020), Dutch field hockey player
- Jan Verroken (1917–2020), Belgian politician
- Jan Versteegh (born 1985), Dutch game show host
- Jan Vertonghen (born 1987), Belgian footballer
- Jan Vesely (born 1990), Czech basketball player
- Jan Erazim Vocel (1803–1871), Czech poet, archaeologist, historian and cultural revivalist
- Jan Vetter (born 1963), lead singer of German punk band Die Ärzte, commonly known as Farin Urlaub
- Jan Uuspõld (born 1973), Estonian actor and musician
- Jan-Michael Vincent (1944–2019), American actor
- Jan Washausen (born 1988), German footballer
- Jan-Michael Williams (born 1984), Trinidadian footballer
- Jan de Wit (born 1945), Dutch politician and lawyer
- Jan Wohlschlag (born 1958), American high jumper
- Jan Wolkers (1925–2007), Dutch author and artist
- Jan Zamoyski (1542–1605), Polish nobleman and magnate
- Jan Dismas Zelenka (1679–1745), Czech baroque composer
- Jan Žižka z Trocnova (c.1360–1424), Czech hussite leader
- Jan Zoon (1923–2016), Dutch politician
- Jan Zumbach (1915–1986), Polish fighter pilot and a flying ace during World War II
- Jan Żabiński (1897–1974), Polish soldier, educator and scientist
- Jan Zázvorka (1914–1991), Czech art director and architect
- Jan Žídek (born 1999), Czech basketballer
- Jan Żuberek (born 2004), Polish footballer

== People (middle name) ==
- Kim Dickens (born Kimberly Jan Dickens) (born 1965), American actress

== People (last name) ==
- Dominique Jan, Columbia University surgeon
- Giorgio Jan (1791–1866), Italian taxonomist

== Film, music, and literature ==
- Jan, in Grease (1978)
- Jan, in Bring It On (2000)
- Jan, in Wrath of Man (2021)
- Jan Arrah, Element Lad from the Legion of Superheroes
- Jan Brady - née Jan Martin, in The Brady Bunch (1969–1974)
- Jan Levinson, in The Office (2005–2013)
- Jan Solo or Ian Solo, Italian name of Han Solo, Star Wars character
- Jan Valek, in Vampires (1998)

== See also ==
- Jahn
- Jaan (given name)
- Ján
- Jann (disambiguation)
- John (given name)
- Yann
- Djan
