= Jan Šťastný (disambiguation) =

Jan Šťastný (c.1764 – c.1830) was a Czech composer.

Jan Šťastný may also refer to:

- Jan Šťastný (actor) (born 1965), Czech actor
- Jan Šťastný (canoeist) (born 1970), Czech canoeist
- Ján Šťastný (hockey player) (born 1982), Slovak hockey player

== See also ==
- Ján
- Jan (name)
- Jan (disambiguation)
- Šťastný
