= Jann =

Jann may refer to:

== People ==
=== Feminine given name ===
- Jann Arden (born 1962), Canadian singer-songwriter
  - Jann Arden (album), her eponymous eighth album
- Jann Browne (born 1954), American country singer
- Jann Carl (born 1960), American journalist
- Jann Sonya McFarlane (born 1944), Australian politician
- Jann Haworth (born 1942), American pop artist
- Jann Knijnenburg (1938–2010), Australian stage actor, model and matriarch of a theatrical family
- Jann Stuckey (born 1955), Australian politician

=== Masculine given name ===
- Jann Hoffmann (1957–2023), Danish darts player
- Jann Jensen (born 1969), Danish football coach and former player
- Jann Klose, German-born pop singer-songwriter
- Jann Mardenborough (born 1991), British racing driver
- Jann Ingi Petersen (born 1984), Faroese footballer
- Jann Sjursen (born 1963), Danish politician
- Jann Wenner (born 1946), co-founder and publisher of Rolling Stone
- Jann Wilde (born 1982), Finnish singer-songwriter

=== Surname ===
- Mario Jann (born 1980), German ice hockey player
- Michael Patrick Jann (born 1970), American actor, writer and director
- Peter Jann (born 1935), Austrian jurist

=== Pseudonym ===
- Jann (singer), Jan Rozmanowski (born 1999), Polish singer-songwriter

== Other uses ==
- Jann (cards), in some card games, to lose without taking a trick or scoring a minimum number of points
- Jann (legendary creature), a kind of genie
- Jann (TV series), a sitcom produced in Canada
- Jann of the Jungle, comic book girl protagonist in the anthology title Jungle Tales (1954)
- Beit Jann, a village in northern Israel

== See also ==
- Jaan (given name)
- Jahn
- Jan (disambiguation)
- Ján
- John (given name)
- Yann
- Jinn (disambiguation)
