= Streeck =

Streeck or van Streeck is a surname. Notable people with the surname include:

- Hendrick van Streeck (1659-1720), Dutch Golden Age painter
- Hendrik Streeck (born 1977), German epidemiologist
- Jan Streeck (born 1997), German politician
- Juriaen van Streeck (1632–1687), Dutch Golden Age painter
- Wolfgang Streeck (born 1946), German economic sociologist
