= Timeline of Haarlem =

The following is a timeline of the history of the municipality of Haarlem, Netherlands.

== Prior to 18th century ==
- 9th century CE - Haarlem founded.
- 1245 - City rights bestowed upon Haarlem by William II of Holland.
- 1318 - Janskerk (church) built.
- 1347 - Fire.
- 1370 - Grote Kerk (church) construction begins.
- 1395 - Hofje van Bakenes (almshouse) founded.
- 1398 - Waalse Kerk (church) built.
- 1478 - Haarlem Confraternity of the Rosary founded.
- 1483 - Printing press in operation.
- 1496 - Haarlem Guild of St. Luke active (approximate date).
- 1559 - Roman Catholic Diocese of Haarlem established.
- 1571 - Kleine Houtpoort (Haarlem) (gate) built.
- 1572 - Siege of Haarlem by Spanish forces begins.
- 1573 - 12 July: Spaniards in power.
- 1576 - Fire.
- 1577 - Population: 18,000 (approximate).
- 1587 - Haarlem Academy of art established.
- 1592 - Lieven de Key appointed city architect.
- 1596 - City Library established.
- 1599 - Weigh House built.
- 1600 - Population: 30,000 (approximate).
- 1603 - Vleeshal built.
- 1604 - City Hall rebuilt.
- 1615 - Lutherse Kerk, Haarlem built.
- 1616 - Artist Frans Hals paints The Banquet of the Officers of the St George Militia Company in 1616.
- 1624 - "Tax riot."
- 1631 - Haarlemmertrekvaart Amsterdam-Haarlem canal created.
- 1634 - Tulip mania begins.
- 1637 - Tulip market collapses.
- 1661 - Artist Jan Steen moves to Haarlem.
- 1662 - Oprechte Haerlemsche Courant newspaper in publication.
- 1677 - Nieuwpoort (Haarlem) (gate) built.
- 1683 - Doopsgezinde kerk, Haarlem (church) built.

== 18th-19th centuries ==
- 1707 - Proveniershuis (almshouse) founded.
- 1719 - Onderlinge van 1719 u.a. established
- 1752 - Holland Society of Sciences founded.
- 1766 - Mozart performs on the Grote Kerk, Haarlem organ.
- 1778 - Teylers Stichting (society) founded.
- 1784
  - Teylers Museum opens.
  - Society for Public Welfare founded.
- 1788 - Villa Welgelegen (residence) built.
- 1794 - Hodshon Huis (residence) built.
- 1821 - Kunst zij ons doel (art group) formed.
- 1832 - Costermonument erected the Haarlemmerhout park.
- 1839 - Amsterdam-Haarlem railway begins operating; Haarlem railway station opens.
- 1840 - City becomes capital of North Holland province.
- 1841 - Haarlem Synagogue built.
- 1852 - Haarlemmermeer (lake) drained.
- 1862 - Gemeentelijk Museum opens.
- 1863 - Droste confectionery in business.
- 1865 - Kenaupark established.
- 1869 - Bisschoppelijk Museum founded.
- 1871 - Colonial Museum opens.
- 1877 - Museum van Kunstnijverheid established.
- 1880 - Verweyhal built for the Trou moet Blycken society.
- 1881 - Haarlem-Leiden tram line begins operating.
- 1883 - Haarlems Dagblad newspaper in publication.
- 1884 - Panopticon prison begins operating.
- 1887 - Melkbrug (bridge) built.
- 1900 - Population: 65,189.

== 20th century ==
- 1903 - Catharijnebrug (Haarlem) (bridge) built.
- 1911 - 31 August: Fokker flies his aircraft "de Spin" around the tower of the Sint-Bavokerk.
- 1915 - Cinema Palace opens.
- 1918 - Haarlem City Theatre opens.
- 1919 - Population: 77,302.
- 1922 - Tuinwijk-Zuid housing built.
- 1936 - Gemeentearchief Haarlem (city archives) moves into the Janskerk.
- 1980
  - Bevrijdingspop festival begins.
  - Brinkmann-bioscoop (cinema) opens.
  - Population: 158,291 municipality.
- 1995 - Jaap Pop becomes mayor.
- 2000 - Population: 148,484 municipality.

== 21st century ==
- 2003 - Toneelschuur theatre opens.
- 2005
  - Noord-Hollands Archief (archive) headquartered in city.
  - Philharmonie Haarlem concert hall active.
- 2006 - Bernt Schneiders becomes mayor.
- 2009 - Schoterbrug (bridge) opens.
- 2011 - Pathé Haarlem cinema opens.
- 2013 - Population: 153,093 municipality.

== See also ==
- Haarlem history
- History of Haarlem
- List of mayors of Haarlem
- List of rijksmonuments in Haarlem
- Timelines of other municipalities in the Netherlands: Amsterdam, Breda, Delft, Eindhoven, Groningen, The Hague, 's-Hertogenbosch, Leiden, Maastricht, Nijmegen, Rotterdam, Utrecht

== Bibliography ==
in English

- Thomas Nugent (1749), "Haerlem", The Grand Tour, vol. 1: Netherlands, London: S. Birt, hdl:2027/mdp.39015030762598
- "Haerlem". Gazetteer of the Netherlands. Attributed to Clement Cruttwell. London: G.G.J. and J. Robinson. 1794.
- Abraham Rees (1819), "Haerlem", The Cyclopaedia, London: Longman, Hurst, Rees, Orme & Brown, hdl:2027/mdp.39015057241179
- "Haarlem". Galignani's Traveller's Guide through Holland and Belgium (4th ed.). Paris: A. and W. Galignani. 1822. hdl:2027/njp.32101073846667.
- "Haarlem", A Handbook for Travellers on the Continent (8th ed.), London: John Murray, 1851
- "Haarlem", Guide to the North of France, ... Belgium and Holland, Edinburgh: Adam and Charles Black, 1876
- George Henry Townsend (1877), "Haarlem", A Manual of Dates (5th ed.), London: Frederick Warne & Co., hdl:2027/wu.89097349427
- W. Pembroke Fetridge (1885), "Haarlem", Harper's Hand-Book for Travellers in Europe and the East, New York: Harper & Brothers
- "Haarlem". Chambers's Encyclopaedia. Vol. 5. London. 1901. hdl:2027/uc2.ark:/13960/t1fj2r624.
- "Haarlem" . Encyclopædia Britannica. Vol. 12 (11th ed.). 1910. p. 781.
- "Haarlem", Belgium and Holland (15th ed.), Leipzig: Karl Baedeker, 1910, OCLC 397759 (+ 1881 ed.)
- Benjamin Vincent (1910), "Haarlem", Haydn's Dictionary of Dates (25th ed.), London: Ward, Lock & Co., hdl:2027/uc2.ark:/13960/t41r6xh8t

in Dutch

- Abraham Jacob van der Aa (1844). "Haarlem". Aardrijkskundig woordenboek der Nederlanden [Geographical dictionary of the Netherlands] (in Dutch). Vol. 5. Gorinchem: Jacobus Noorduyn. hdl:2027/mdp.39015039363992 – via HathiTrust.
- Henri Zondervan [in Dutch], ed. (1917), "Haarlem", Winkler Prins' Geillustreerde Encyclopaedie (in Dutch), vol. 8 (4th ed.), Amsterdam: Uitgevers-Maatschappy „Elsevier“, hdl:2027/mdp.39015068347981
- G. van Herwijnen, ed. (1978). "Holland: Haarlem". Bibliografie van de stedengeschiedenis van Nederland [Bibliography of Urban History in the Netherlands] (in Dutch). Brill. pp. 207+. ISBN 90-04-05700-5.
- Deugd boven geweld: een geschiedenis van Haarlem, 1245–1995 [Virtue above Violence: A History of Haarlem] (in Dutch). 1995.
- Wim de Wagt; et al. (2005). Architectuurgids Haarlem (in Dutch). 010 Publishers. ISBN 978-90-6450-550-8 – via Google Books. (fulltext)
