= Šťastný =

- Pronunciation: [ˈʃcastniː]

Origin
- Meaning: happy
- Region of origin: Czech Republic and Slovakia; Burgenland, Austria

Other names
- Variant form: Stastny

Šťastný (pronounced [ˈʃcastniː]) is a Czech and Slovak surname which literally means "happy". The feminine form of the surname is Šťastná.

Spelling variants include Stiastny/Stiastna, Stiasny/Stiasna, Stiassny/Stiassna, etc..

The surname may refer to:

== Šťastný ==
=== Sports ===
==== Slovak ice hockey family ====
- First generation (all brothers):
  - Marián Šťastný (born 1953), Slovak–Canadian winger
  - Peter Šťastný (born 1956), Slovak–Canadian Hall of Fame centre; also notable as a politician in Slovakia
  - Anton Šťastný (born 1959), Slovak–Canadian winger
- Second generation (both sons of Peter):
  - Yan Stastny (Ján Šťastný) (born 1982), Canadian–American centre
  - Paul Stastny (Pavol Šťastný) (born 1985), Canadian–American centre

==== Others ====
- Andrej Šťastný (born 1991), Slovak professional ice hockey player (not related to the above family)
- Bohuslav Šťastný (born 1949), retired Czech professional ice hockey player (also unrelated to the Slovak Šťastný family)
- František Šťastný (1927 − 2000), Czech Grand Prix motorcycle racer
- Jarmila Šťastná (1932–2015), Czech speed skater
- Jiří Šťastný (born 1938), Czech basketball player
- Leopold Šťastný (1911 − 1996), Slovak football (soccer) player and trainer
- Jan Šťastný (canoeist) (born 1970), Czech canoeist

=== Arts ===
- Bohumil Šťastný (1905 − 1991), Czech photographer
- Jan Šťastný (violoncellist) (c. 1764 − ?), Czech composer and cellist
- Jan Šťastný (actor) (born 1965), Czech actor
- Marie Šťastná (born 1981), Czech poet
- Vladimír Šťastný (1841 − 1910), Czech priest and poet

== Stastney ==
- Spencer Stastney (born 2000), American ice hockey player

== Stiasny ==
- Franz Stiasny (1881 - 1941), Austrian medal maker
- Edmund Stiasny, the namesake of the Stiasny's method for analysis of tannins

== Stiassny ==
- Wilhelm Stiassny (1842, Preßburg - 1910 Bad Ischl), a Jewish Hungarian-Austrian architect
- Ignaz Stiaßny (1849 - 1909), Austrian theatre director and -agent
- Robert Stiassny (1862, Vienna - 1917), Austrian art historian
- Felix Stiassny (1867 - 1938), Austrian industrialist
- Rudolf Viktor Stiaßny (pseudonym: Viktor Staal; 1909, Frankstadt (Czech: Frenštát pod Radhoštěm), Moravia - 1982), Moravian-Austrian actor
- Alfred Stiassny, Austrian Professor of the Wirtschaftsuniversität Wien
- Melanie Stiassny (b.1953), German ichthyologist

== See also ==
- Ščasný (other form)
- Szczęsny (Polish form)
