= Curt Faudon =

Austrian film director (1949–2019)

- Born: Kurt Faudon; 10 May 1949; Graz, Austria
- Died: 25 July 2019 (aged 70)
- Occupation: Film director
- Years active: 1972 - present

Curt Faudon (10 May 1949 - 25 July 2019) was an Austrian film director who wrote, produced and directed over 30 films. He received First Prizes and Jury Awards at Film Festivals in Cannes, Berlin, Monte Carlo, Chicago, New York, and Sydney.

Faudon was born in Graz in 1949, and moved to New York City in 1979. His films, in a style all of their own, show a keen eye for detail, colour and light. Faudon's son, Patrick Faudon, is a film producer.

== Films ==
- Magic Graz (1972); writer/director
- Hugo Wolf (1976) director; documentary starring Oskar Werner as Hugo Wolf; ORF, ZDF
- George Orwell (1984) director; documentary on George Orwell; written by Hilde Spiel; ORF, ZDF, RAI, SRG
- Good News from Austria (1984) director; documentary on the Austrian economy
- Fanny von Arnstein (1985) director; feature based on the book by Hilde Spiel; ORF, ARD
- Christmas with Willi (1985) writer/director; feature, ORF, ZDF
- Auf dem Schnee ein Feuer (1986/87) writer/director; documentary; ORF, ZDF
- Land der Täler, parts 1-10 (1989–1991) director; documentary; ORF
- Top Spot, parts 1-3 (1989–1991) TV show; writer/director/producer; with Désirée Nosbusch, Philip Michael Thomas, Shirley Bassey
- Melting Pot of Illusions, parts 1&2 (1992) writer/director; TV documentary on the USA 500 years after Christopher Columbus, PBS channel 13
- Mount of Olives (1990) director; TV documentary; ORF, PBS
- Loaves and Fishes (1991) director; TV documentary; ORF, PBS
- Nothing but reality (1989) director; documentary based on the book by Hilde Spiel; ORF, ZDF, PBS
- Die verweigerte Zärtlichkeit (1986) director; feature film based on the book by H. Fink; ORF
- Cross Town Sabbath/Zwang zur Unrast (1994/95) writer/director/producer; docudrama based on the book by Frederic Morton, ORF, PBS, Channel 13
- Total Relaunch of TV News Station n-tv/CNN writer/director/producer; 1997 in Berlin
- Death Run (1997/1998) Writer/Director; feature film starring Rupert Frazer, Francois-Eric Gendron, Alexander Peskov, Thomas Heinze, Jerry Cala; Sat.1, BAVARIA, ORF
- Flames of Death (1999) co-author/Director; feature film starring Heino Ferch, Natalia Wörner, Axel Milberg: Kirch Group, SAT 1, ORF
- Trivial Pursuit (2000) co-author/Director; feature film starring Tobias Moretti, Jule Ronstedt, Thomas Heinze, SAT 1
- Tattoo (2000) co-author/Director; feature film starring Tobias Moretti, Katja Weitzenböck, Benjamin Sadler, Gudrun Landgrebe, Erwin Steinhauer: Sat.1, Kirch Group, ORF, Vienna Film Commission
- Universum Steirische Toskana (2000) Writer/Director/Producer; documentary; ORF
- Universum Tirol - Leben im Bergland (2001) Writer/Director/Producer; documentary; ORF, Faudon Movies
- Universum Carinthia - Leben am Wasser (2002/2003) Writer/Director/Producer; documentary; ORF-Cine, Culture Carinthia, Faudon Movies, WDR
- Szczesny - The Film (2003/2004) Writer/Director/Producer; documentary on Stefan Szczesny
- Commercials Österreich Werbung
- Discover the Joy - Austria (2002/2003); commercial. Won first prize at the film festivals in New York, Los Angeles, Karlsbad, at the 2003 ITB Berlin, and the Grand Prix CITF for best commercial
- Deadly Diversion (2004) co-author/Director; feature film starring Ken Duken, Sebastian Koch, Eva Hassmann, August Schmölzer, Rosie Alvarez; EPO Film, ORF, Towers Production London, Cine Carinthia
- Universum New York Central Park (2004/2005) Writer/Director/Producer; documentary; ORF, WDR, Faudon Movies
- "Silk Road - Songs Along the Road and Time" (2007/2008) film about the Vienna Boys' Choir - Director
- The End of Something. Ernest Hemingway co-author/Director; in production

== Awards ==
- 1972, Cannes Film Festival: nomination, Palme d'Or, best short film (Magic Graz)
- 2002, New York Festivals, International Film and Video Competition: Finalist (Snowdance in Austria: Discover the Joy)
- 2002, ITB Berlin: First Prize (Discover the Joy)
- 2002, CIFFT - Comité International des Festivals du Film Touristique Grand Prix, Best Commercial World Wide (Discover the Joy)
- 2005, US International Film and Video Festival, Los Angeles: Golden Camera Award (Mozart)
- 2007, US International Film and Video Festival, Los Angeles: Certificate for Creative Excellence (Sailing Island)
- 2007, ITB Berlin: First Prize (Vienna Collection)
- 2007, CIFFT - Comité International des Festivals du Film Touristique Grand Prix, Best Commercial World Wide (Vienna Collection)
- 2007, US International Film and Video Festival, Los Angeles: Silver Screen Award (Vienna Collection)
- 2007, New York Festivals, International Film and Video Competition: Bronze World Medal (Sailing Island)
