= Djan =

Djan is both a masculine given name and a surname that is mainly found in Ghana. Notable people with the name include:

== Surname ==
- Abraham Ohene-Djan (born 1974), Ghanaian-British producer, director and media professional
- Ahmad Djan (born 1948), Afghan wrestler
- Djan-Aka Djan (born 1942), Afghan wrestler
- Kojo Boakye-Djan (died 2023), Ghanaian military officer and coup plotter
- Makarios Djan (1955–2026), Ghanaian sprinter
- Ohene Djan (1924–1987), Ghanaian sports administrator and politician
- Samuel Nsowah-Djan (born 1961), Ghanaian politician

== Given name ==
- Djan Faridz (born 1950), Indonesian businessman and former politician
- Giok Djan Khoe (born 1946), Indonesian photonic scientist and academic
- Djan Madruga (born 1958), Brazilian freestyle swimmer
- Djan Silveberg (born 1969), French visual artist

== See also ==
- Degna Djan, an emperor of the Kingdom of Aksum (9th or 10th century)
- Kiki Gyan (1957–2004), also known as Kiki Djan, Ghanaian musician
- Tengku Djan Ley (born 1976), Malaysian racing driver
- Djan Djan, a studio album (2010)
- Can (name)
