= Ahmad Jan =

Ahmad Jan is the name of:

- Ehmetjan Qasim (1914–1949), Uyghur Soviet communist puppet leader of Second East Turkestan Republic
- Nur Ahmad Jan Bughra (died 1934), Uyghur Emir of the First East Turkestan Republic
- Ahmad Jan (Bagram detainee) (born 1948), named on the first official list of Bagram detainees
- Maulvi Ahmad Jan (Taliban governor) (died 2013), former governor of Zabol Province
- Ahmed Jan Thirakwa, Indian tabla player

== See also ==
- Ahmed Jan (disambiguation)
