= Elizabeth Schmitz =

Dutch politician (1938–2024)

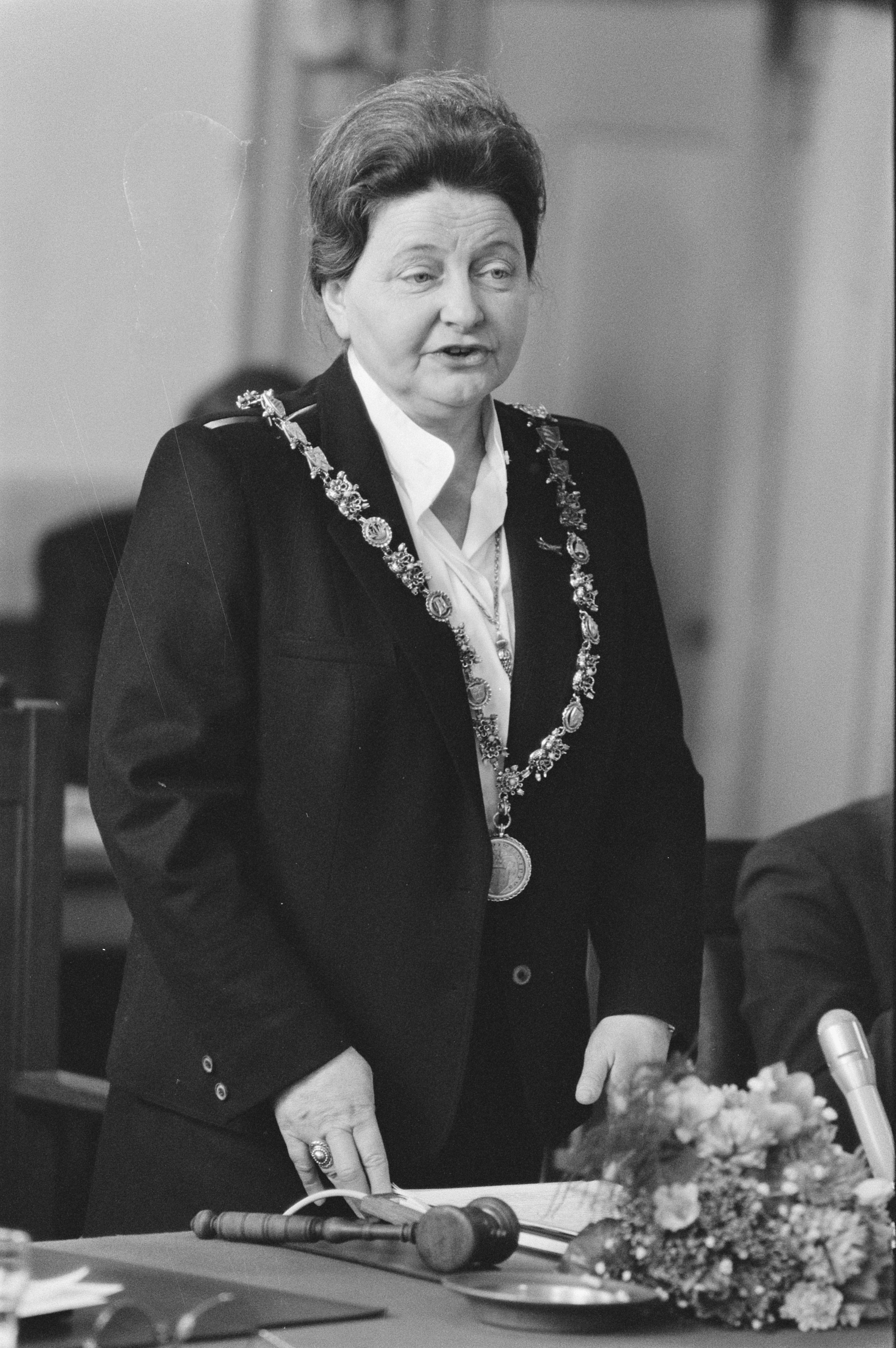
- Schmitz in 1985

Secretary of State for Justice
- In office 22 August 1994 – 3 August 1998
- Prime Minister: Wim Kok
- Preceded by: Aad Kosto
- Succeeded by: Job Cohen

Mayor of Haarlem
- In office 1985–1994
- Preceded by: Jan Reehorst
- Succeeded by: Jaap Pop

Personal details
- Born: 20 May 1938 Rotterdam, Netherlands
- Died: 31 December 2024 (aged 86)
- Party: Democrats 66 (to 1974); Labour Party (from 1974)
- Domestic partner: Ien Dales (1981–1994)
- Education: Erasmus University

Elizabeth Maria Alida Schmitz (20 May 1938 – 31 December 2024) was a Dutch politician of the Labour Party (PvdA).

== Early life ==
Schmitz was born on 20 May 1938 in Rotterdam. She came from a middle-class Catholic family and her father, who sold tobacco, died early. She was the only girl of five children. She completed her secondary education at a girls school before spending a year working as an au pair in England, while studying for a lower certificate from the University of Cambridge. She then moved back to Rotterdam, where she worked for a shipping firm and then for the Stichting Samenwerkende Kerken. From 1958 to 1974, Schmitz worked for educational organisations in Rotterdam. At the same time, she studied administrative law and political science at Erasmus University, studying at the evenings and on weekends.

== Political career ==
Schmitz first became involved in politics in 1968, when she joined the Democrats 66 (D66). From 1972 to 1974, Schmitz was a member of the Rotterdam City Council. She served first as a member of the D66 and then, in 1974, joined the Labour Party (PvdA). She became an alderman for social affairs on behalf of that party, serving between 1974 and 1982. She opposed cuts to social services and following fraud in the department, she appointed Ien Dales to take over as the social services director. While serving in these positions, the two women became close.

Schmitz was elected as the mayor of Haarlem between 16 February 1985 and 3 August 1994. During this period, she had a relationship with Dales, then mayor of Nijmegen. She succeeded Jos van Kemenade as vice president of Pax Christi in 1986. She remained in this position until she joined the cabinet in 1994.

Schmitz was appointed the Secretary of State for Justice by Wim Kok on 22 August 1994, serving in the Kok I cabinet. She was responsible for immigration and asylum policy, family law, youth advocacy, gambling, legal aid and nationality. She held this position until 3 August 1998. During her tenure as state secretary, asylum policy was a hot topic across Europe. Schmitz made an effort to deport illegal immigrants from the Netherlands. The most famous of them was Amsterdam tailor Gümüş, who had to return to Turkey with his family after living and working in the Netherlands for many years. While in this position, she proposed legislation to pardon illegal immigrants who had been living in the country for six years, but this was blocked by the D66 and the People's Party for Freedom and Democracy (VVD).

Schmitz was a deputy judge in the district court in Zwolle between 1999 and 2008 and a deputy judge in the district court in Zutphen between 2004 and 2008. She was a member of the Advisory Council on International Affairs between 2001 and January 2006 and a chair of the Advisory Board Members Selection Committee Judiciary from 2005.

After four years as secretary of state, she left politics in August 1998. From 1999 to 2009, Schmitz chaired the curatorium of the African Studies Centre in Leiden. On 1 February 2000, she succeeded Til Gardeniers-Berendsen as the health insurance ombudsman, a position she held until 2010.

== Personal life and death ==
Schmitz was Roman Catholic and in 1970, she was offered a position as assistant secretary of the diocese of Rotterdam, but she rejected the offer due to her conflict with the bishop of the diocese, Adrianus Johannes Simonis. In 2016, an exhibit at the Museum Haarlem honoured the former mayors of the city, including Schmitz, Bernt Schneiders, Jaap Pop and Jan Reehorst.

Schmitz died on 31 December 2024, at the age of 86.
