= Veentjer =

Veentjer is a surname. Notable people with the surname include:

- Els Veentjer-Spruyt (born 1943), Dutch tennis player
- Jan Veentjer (1938–2020), Dutch field hockey player
