= Candemir =

Candemir is a Turkish given name for males and a surname. The name is composed of the elements can (spirit, life, or heart) and demir (iron).

== Surname ==
- Adil Candemir (1917–1989), Turkish sport wrestler
- Koray Candemir (born 1975), Turkish musician, songwriter, and record producer
