= Cansever =

Cansever is a Turkish name. It is a combination of the words can, meaning "life" (loaned from Persian jan) and sever, which means "love". It may refer to:

- Edip Cansever (1928–1986), Turkish poet
- Fahrettin Cansever (1930–1987), Turkish footballer
- Turgut Cansever (1921–2009), Turkish architect
- Cansever (1967–2026), Turkish-Macedonian singer
