= Jahn =

Jahn is a German surname. Notable people with this surname include:

- Constanze Jahn (born 1963), German chess player
- David Jahn (filmmaker) (born 1975), Swiss-Czech burlesque impresario
- David Jahn (racing driver) (born 1990), German racing driver
- Dennis Jahn (born 1992), German politician
- Eduard Jahn (1871–1942), German mycologist and microbiologist
- Erich Jahn (born 1907, date of death unknown), Hitler Youth leader
- Friedrich Ludwig Jahn (1778–1852), German educator, founding figure of German Turner athletic movement
- Gerhard Jahn (1927–1998), German politician, Federal Minister of Justice (1969–1974)
- Gunnar Jahn (1883–1971), Norwegian politician and resistance member
- Gunter Jahn (1910–1992), German U-boat commander
- Hans Max Jahn (1853–1906), German physical chemist
- Helmut Jahn (1940–2021), German-American architect
- Hermann Arthur Jahn (1907–1979), British scientist
- Jan Jahn (1739–1802), Czech painter and art historian
- Jaroslav Jahn (1865–1934), Czech paleontologist, mineralogist and geologist
- Jeff Jahn (born 1970), American artist and critic
- Johann Jahn (1750–1816), German Orientalist
- Kurt Jahn (1892–1966), German general
- Marie-Luise Jahn (1918–2010), German physician
- Martin Jahn (c. 1620 – c. 1682), German church musician, minister, hymnwriter
- Martin Jahn (born 1970), Czech economist and politician
- Michael Jahn (born 1943), American author and critic
- Molly Jahn, American plant scientist and food security policy advisor
- Otto Jahn (1813–1869), German archaeologist, philologist, and writer on art and music
- Robert G. Jahn (1930–2017), American scientist, electrical engineer, and psychic investigator
- Ryan David Jahn (born 1979), American novelist and screenwriter
- Thomas Jahn (born 1965), German film and television director
- Wilhelm Jahn (1835–1900), Austro-Hungarian orchestral conductor
- Willie Jahn (1889–1973), German athlete, leader of the Wandervogel youth movement, folksong composer, publisher, World War II army officer

== See also ==
- Hans Henny Jahnn (1894–1959), German writer and playwright
- Sigmund Jähn (1937–2019), German astronaut
- Felix Jaehn (born 1994), German DJ and record producer
- Jahns, a surname
- Jan (name)
- SSV Jahn Regensburg, German football club also known as Der Jahn
