= Jaan =

Jaan may refer to:

- Jaan (given name)
- Jaan (album), an Indian pop album by Sonu Nigam
- Jaan (film), a 1996 Bollywood action film directed by Raj Kanwar
- Gauhar Jaan (1873–1930), Indian singer and dancer

== See also ==
- Jan (disambiguation)
- Jaaneman (disambiguation)
