= Jaaneman =

Jaaneman (lit. 'Sweetheart' or 'Darling') may refer to these Indian films:

- Jaaneman (1976 film), a Bollywood film
- Jaaneman (2012 film), a Bengali-language film
- Jaan-E-Mann, a 2006 Bollywood film
- Jan.E.Man, a 2021 Malayalam-language film

== See also ==
- Jaan (disambiguation)
- "Jaaneman Jaaneman Tere Do Nayan", a song by Salil Chowdhury, Asha Bhosle and K. J. Yesudas from the 1976 film Chhoti Si Baat
