= Jahns =

Jahns or Jähns is a surname. Notable people with the surname include:

- Annette Jahns (1958-2020), German operatic mezzo-soprano and contralto, and opera director
- Friedrich Wilhelm Jähns (1809-1888), German music scholar, voice-teacher, and composer
- Sigrid Jahns (born 1945), German historian

== See also ==
- Jahn, another surname
- Jahn's
