= Szczęsny =

Szczęsny (Polish pronunciation: [ˈʂt͡ʂɛ̃snɨ]; feminine: Szczęsna), Szczesny, or Sczesny is a Polish given name and surname, meaning "lucky". It is the Polish equivalent of the Czech and Slovak surname Šťastný.

== Notable people ==
=== Surname ===
- Bernard Szczęsny (1919–1999), Polish activist
- Joanna Szczęsna (born 1949), Polish journalist
- Maciej Szczęsny (born 1965), Polish football goalkeeper
- Piotr Szczęsny (1963–2017), Polish activist
- Roman Szczęsny (1929–2000), Polish geographer
- Stefan Szczesny (born 1951), German artist
- Wojciech Szczęsny (born 1990), Polish football goalkeeper
- Matt Sczesny (1932–2009), American baseball, manager, and scout
- Dennis Szczęsny (born 1993), German-Polish handball player

=== Given name ===
- Saint Zygmunt Szczęsny Feliński (1822–1895), Archbishop of Warsaw
- Antoni Szczęsny Godlewski, (1923–1944) Polish legendary soldier
- Jan Szczęsny Herburt (1567–1616), Polish-Ukrainian political writer and diplomat
- Szczęsny Potocki (1753–1805), Polish military commander

== Places ==
- Szczęsna, a village in Poland
