= Jos Wienen =

Dutch politician

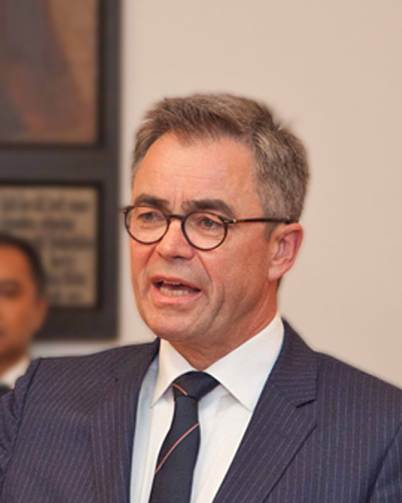

Mayor of Haarlem
- Incumbent
- Assumed office 21 September 2016

Mayor of Katwijk
- In office January 2001 – 21 September 2016

Personal details
- Born: 3 October 1960 (age 64); Ridderkerk, Netherlands

Jos Wienen (born 3 October 1960 in Ridderkerk) is a Dutch politician. He is mayor of the city of Haarlem.

Wienen studied history and theology at Utrecht University. After that he became a staff member of the Dutch Reformed Church. In 1986 he became a councilor for the Christian Democratic Appeal (CDA) in the municipality of Ridderkerk. In 1993 he became also an alderman. Within his responsibilities were spatial planning, housing, traffic and transport, and economic affairs. Wienen was also part-time vice-president of the city region Rotterdam.

In 2001, Wienen became mayor of the municipality of Katwijk. In 2006, Katwijk merged with Rijnsburg and Valkenburg and became known as the municipality of Katwijk. Wienen was also member of the executive committee of the region Holland Rijnland, of which Katwijk is a part.

On 21 September 2016, Wienen exchanged Katwijk for the city Haarlem where he succeeded Bernt Schneiders as mayor.

Presumably as a result of his strict stance towards motor cycling gangs Jos Wienen was threatened from October 2018 onwards. The news became public and got a lot of media attention in the Netherlands. Some citizens from Haarlem even organised a gathering on the Grote Markt to support the mayor and pray for the threats to cease. He lived in a safe house for roughly six months where he was being guarded 24 hours a day. He has since left the safe house.
