= Ahmed Jan =

Ahmed Jan may refer to:

- Sultan Ahmad Khan, or Jan, ruler of the Emirate of Herat
- Ahmed Jan (referee), Pakistani footballer and referee

== See also ==
- Ahmad Jan (disambiguation)
