= Can Emre Yücel =

Turkish footballer

Emre Yücel
Personal information
- Full name: Emre Yücel
- Date of birth: June 25, 1983 (age 43)
- Place of birth: Kocaeli, Turkey
- Height: 1.85 m (6 ft 1 in)
- Position: Goalkeeper

Team information
- Current team: Kocaelispor
- Number: 1

Youth career
- 1999: Gölcükspor
- 1999: Gaziantepspor

Senior career*
Years	Team	Apps	(Gls)
2000–2001	Gaskispor		
2001–2002	Gaziantep B.B.	1	(0)
2002–2003	Erzurumspor	0	(0)
2003–2004	Diyarbakirspor	0	(0)
2004–2005	Kocaelispor	0	(0)
2005–2006	Yimpaş Yozgatspor	39	(0)
2007–2008	Ankaragücü	0	(0)
2008–2009	Akçaabat Sebatspor	26	(0)
2009–2010	Körfez Belediyespor	1	(0)
2011–XXXX	Ankara Jandarmagücü		
2014–2015	Çınarlı Spor	23	(0)
2015–	Kocaelispor		

International career
1999	Turkey U15	3	(0)
- * Club domestic league appearances and goals

Emre Yücel (born June 25, 1983 in Kocaeli, Turkey) is a Turkish football player who currently plays as a goalkeeper for Kocaelispor.
