= Mario Jann =

German ice hockey player

- Born: January 6, 1980 (age 45); Rosenheim, West Germany
- Height: 6 ft 0 in (183 cm)
- Weight: 165 lb (75 kg; 11 st 11 lb)
- Position: Centre
- Shot: Left
- Played for: EHC Klostersee; TSV Erding; Starbulls Rosenheim; EHC München; ESC Dorfen; TEV Miesbach; EHC Bad Aibling
- NHL draft: Undrafted
- Playing career: 1998–2017

Mario Jann (born January 6, 1980) is a German professional ice hockey player. He is currently playing for EHC München in the Deutsche Eishockey Liga (DEL).

== Career statistics ==
			Regular season					Playoffs
Season	Team	League	GP	G	A	Pts	PIM	GP	G	A	Pts	PIM
1997–98	EHC Klostersee	Germany3	43	10	13	23	38	—	—	—	—	—
1998–99	TSV Erding	Germany2	42	0	3	3	8	13	1	0	1	4
1999–00	TSV Erding	Germany3	61	7	7	14	32	—	—	—	—	—
2000–01	Erding Jets	Germany2	44	3	6	9	36	—	—	—	—	—
2002–03	Starbulls Rosenheim	Germany4	32	20	14	34	28	—	—	—	—	—
2003–04	HC München 98	Germany3	53	26	20	46	75	5	2	8	10	4
2004–05	EHC München	Germany3	50	17	18	35	56	9	1	5	6	8
2005–06	EHC München	Germany2	52	8	12	20	70	—	—	—	—	—
2006–07	EHC München	Germany2	51	7	8	15	57	9	1	2	3	6
2007–08	EHC München	Germany2	52	5	6	11	28	—	—	—	—	—
2008–09	EHC München	Germany2	48	6	13	19	22	13	2	0	2	4
2009–10	EHC München	Germany2	45	7	9	16	26	9	1	3	4	4
2010–11	ESC Dorfen	Germany4	20	8	18	26	26	—	—	—	—	—
2010–11	EHC München	DEL	14	1	0	1	2	2	0	0	0	0
2011–12	EHC München	DEL	1	0	0	0	0	—	—	—	—	—
2011–12	EHC Klostersee	Germany3	10	3	8	11	14	3	1	2	3	6
2012–13	TEV Miesbach	Germany4	27	14	19	33	28	8	2	3	5	10
2013–14	TEV Miesbach	Germany4	29	13	21	34	18	9	4	5	9	4
2014–15	EHC Bad Aibling	Germany5	14	13	7	20	24	—	—	—	—	—
2015–16	EHC Bad Aibling	Germany5	29	25	30	55	54	—	—	—	—	—
2016–17	EHC Bad Aibling	Germany5	26	17	25	42	14	—	—	—	—	—
DEL totals			15	1	0	1	2	2	0	0	0	0
Germany2 totals			334	36	57	93	247	44	5	5	10	18
Germany3 totals			217	63	66	129	215	17	4	15	19	18
