= Jan Jahn =

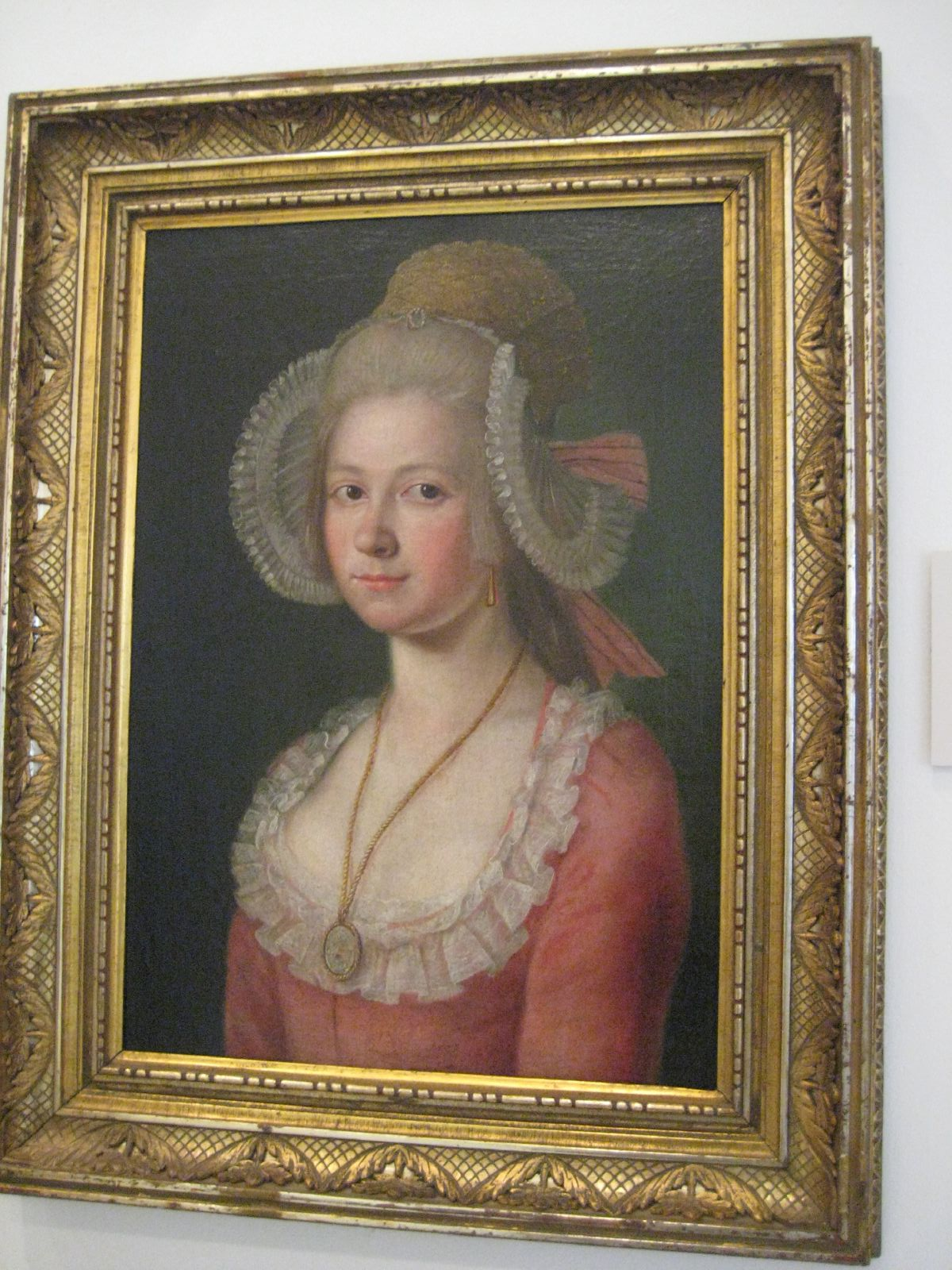
Portrait of a Lady with a Bonnet (1785)

Jan Jakub Quirin Jahn (4 June 1739 – 18 August 1802, both in Prague) was a painter and art historian from Bohemia.

Jahn studied painting from an early age, under his father until 1758 and later under established painters Jan Ferdinand Schor and František Xaver Palko. From 1761 he studied art at the Academy in Vienna. Jahn was the last leader of the Prague guild of painters, before the guild was dissolved as part of reforms of Joseph II. Jahn was also very well-travelled.

While Jahn was merely a competent artist, if not outstanding, he had a highly developed education in history and theory of arts. The majority of his customers were churches and religious orders, and their decline towards the end of 18th century caused Jahn to fall into financial difficulty. He unwillingly turned his attention to business, selling textiles, while continuing painting as a leisure activity. His most famous work was a history of painting in Bohemia.
