= Jan =

Jan, JaN or JAN may refer to:

== Acronyms ==
- Jackson, Mississippi (Amtrak station), US, Amtrak station code JAN
- Jackson-Evers International Airport, Mississippi, US, IATA code
- Jabhat al-Nusra (JaN), a Syrian militant group
- Japanese Article Number, a barcode standard compatible with EAN
- Japanese Accepted Name, a Japanese nonproprietary drug name
- Job Accommodation Network, US, for people with disabilities
- Joint Army-Navy, US standards for electronic color codes, etc.
- Journal of Advanced Nursing

== Personal name ==
- Jan (name), male variant of John, female shortened form of Janet and Janice
- Jan (Persian name), Persian word meaning 'life', 'soul', 'dear'; also used as a name
- Ran (surname), romanized from Mandarin as Jan in Wade–Giles
- Ján, Slovak name

== Other uses ==
- January, as an abbreviation for the first month of the year in the Gregorian calendar
- Jan (cards), a term in some card games when a player loses without taking any tricks or scoring a minimum number of points
- Jan (comic book writer), pseudonym of Spanish comic book artist Juan López Fernández
- Jan Mayen, Norwegian island in the Arctic Ocean
- "Jan", a WIGS-produced YouTube drama
- "Jan", a short film produced by Amos Yee

== See also ==
- Jaan (disambiguation)
