= Jan O. Jonsson =

Swedish sociologist

- Occupation: Sociologist

Academic background
- Education: Phd
- Alma mater: Stockholm University

Academic work
- Discipline: Sociology
- Sub-discipline: social stratification
- Institutions: Nuffield College in Oxford University

Jan O. Jonsson is a Swedish sociologist who researches social stratification as a fellow of Nuffield College in Oxford University.

== Early life and education ==
Jan O. Jonsson pursued an academic career focused on social stratification, with particular attention to social inequality, social mobility, ethnic stratification, and ethnic integration. He earned his Doctor in Sociology (Ph.D) from Stockholm University in 1988. In November 1991, he was appointed as a docent (associate professor) in Sociology at the same university.

== Academic career ==
=== Early academic roles (1991–1998) ===
In 1993, Jan O. Jonsson was given the Swedish Government Award to prominent researchers for his work on social mobility and historical class perspectives. Jonsson acted as an administrative manager on the 1991 Swedish Level of Living survey (LNU), which focused on gathering data on problems affecting low income groups to engineer solutions. His work focused on broadening the scale of the survey along three areas: including a work-life history section, interviews with people on an upper age limit, and interviews with employers of with small employee quantities.

=== Swedish Institute for Social Research (SOFI) (1998–present) ===
Jonsson has worked in the Swedish Institute for Social Research (SOFI) as professor of sociology in Stockholm University since 1998. In the same year, he became the director of the Swedish Level of Living survey (LNU).

=== CILS4EU and ethnic integration (2009–present) ===
In 2009, he became the Swedish PI for the Children of Immigrants Longitudinal Survey in Four European Countries (CILS4EU), a project studying the ethnic integration of young people across the European Union (EU) led by Franz Kalter with the University of Mannheim. Jonsson has used his education on ethnic integration and social mobility to support the wellbeing of children, particularly of immigrants.

== Publications ==
=== Books and articles ===
- Growing up in Diverse Societies: The Integration of the Children of Immigrants in England, Germany, the Netherlands, and Sweden (October 4, 2018): This book is one of the most comprehensive data collections of ethnic minority youths across the European Union (EU); focusing on language proficiency, host country identification, and economic resources.
- Religious development from adolescence to early adulthood among Muslim and Christian youth in Germany: A person-oriented approach (August 27, 2024): A comparative study on integration of religious minorities in Germany, noting the development of low risk behavior and growing conservative attitudes across society.
- Estimating Social and Ethnic Inequality in School Surveys: Biases from Child Misreporting and Parent Nonresponse (February 20, 2015): An evaluation of children's misrepresentation of their families socioeconomic status and low income parents' nonresponse bias, correctly quantifying prior measurement errors. The data was used to analyze disparities between immigrant and non-immigrant families.
- Determined to Succeed? Performance versus Choice in Educational Attainment (January, 2013): This book focuses on the differences between educational attainment, immigrant children's choices, and performance results. Noting that disparities in opportunities affecting minority groups leaves them disadvantaged to obtain the same achievement as their majority peers.

=== Journals ===
Jonsson has been published across multiple journals, including:

- American Sociological Review
- Social Forces
- European Sociological Review
