= Jan Czerlinski =

Czech ice hockey forward

- Born: May 11, 1967 (age 58)
- Height: 5 ft 11 in (180 cm)
- Weight: 176 lb (80 kg; 12 st 8 lb)
- Position: Forward
- Shot: Left
- Played for: HC Pardubice; KLH Jindřichův Hradec; Courmaosta HC; HC Kometa Brno
- Playing career: 1986–2006

Jan Czerlinski (born May 11, 1967) is a Czech former professional ice hockey forward.

Czerlinski played 150 games in the Czechoslovak First Ice Hockey League for HC Pardubice and 68 games in the Czech Extraliga for KLH Jindřichův Hradec and HC Kometa Brno. He also played three games in the Italian Serie A for Courmaosta HC during the 1994–95 season.
