= Can (name) =

Given name

Can (Turkish: [dʒan]) is a common Turkish, Azerbaijani and Circassian given name and surname, meaning spirit, life, soul or heart. Turkish and Azerbaijani use is derived from the Persian word Jan (Persian: جان) and Circassian use is derived from Circassian word Janberk. Džan is a variant in use in Bosnia and Herzegovina.

== Given name ==
=== First name ===
- Can Akın (born 1983), Turkish basketball player
- Can Arat (born 1984), Turkish footballer
- Can Artam (born 1981), Turkish race car driver
- Can Atilla (born 1969), Turkish composer and musician
- Can Ayvazoğlu (born 1979), Turkish volleyball player
- Can Bartu (1936–2019), Turkish basketball player, footballer and columnist
- Pashanim (born 2000), German rapper of Kurdish descent whose real name is Can David Bayram
- Can Bonomo (born 1987), Turkish pop singer
- Can Dündar (born 1961), Turkish journalist, columnist and documentarian
- Can Emre Yücel (born 1983), Turkish footballer
- Can Erdem (born 1987), Turkish footballer
- Can Ergenekan (born 1972), Turkish-American swimmer
- Can Kim Hua, Vietnamese-American professional poker player
- Can Korkmaz (born 1992), Turkish basketball player
- Can Maxim Mutaf (born 1991), Turkish basketball player
- Can Öncü (born 2003), Turkish motorcycle racer
- Can Özüpek (born 1996), Turkish triple jumper
- Can Themba (1924–68), South African short-story writer
- Can Togay (born 1955), Hungarian film director
- Can Yücel (1926–1999), Turkish poet
- Can Yaman, Turkish actor

=== Middle name ===
- Coşkun Can Aktan (born 1963), Turkish professor of economics
- Asım Can Gündüz (1955–2016), Turkish rock and blues guitarist
- Emre Can Coşkun (born 1994), Turkish footballer
- Ömer Can Sokullu (born 1988), Turkish footballer
- Bahtiyar Can Vanlı (born 1962), German-Turkish football coach

== Chinese and Vietnamese ==
- Huy Cận (1919–2005), Vietnamese poet
- Kun Can (1612 – after 1674), Chinese painter
- Liu Can (died 318), emperor of the Chinese/Xiongnu state Han Zhao
- Liu Can (Tang dynasty) (died 906), official of the Chinese Tang dynasty
- Ngô Đình Cẩn (1911–64), member of South Vietnam's Diệm government
- Nguyễn Bá Cẩn (1930–2009), former Prime Minister of South Vietnam
- Trịnh Căn (1633–1709), Vietnamese ruler
- Wang Can (177–217), politician, scholar and poet during Chinese Han dynasty
- Wu Can (died 245), official of Eastern Wu during the Chinese Three Kingdoms period
- Yuan Can (420–477), high-level official of the Chinese dynasty Liu Song
- Zhou Can (born 1979), Chinese long jumper
- Zhu Can (died 621), rebel leader during the Chinese Sui dynasty

== Surname ==
- Cem Can (born 1981), Turkish footballer
- Cihan Can (born 1986), Turkish footballer
- Çiğdem Can Rasna (born 1976), Turkish volleyball player
- Derya Can Göçen, Turkish world record holder female free-diver
- Emre Can (born 1994), German footballer
- Emre Can (chess player) (born 1990), Turkish Grand Master chess player
- Erdem Can (born 1980), Turkish basketball coach
- Erkan Can (born 1958), Turkish film and theatre actor
- Eyüp Can (boxer) (born 1964), Turkish boxer
- Melisa Can (born 1984), U.S.-born Turkish female basketball player
- Mustafa Can (born 1969), Swedish author and journalist of Kurdish origin
- Müslüm Can (born 1975), German footballer
- Nachan Can (fl.16th cent.), Maya ruler
- Osman Can, Turkish jurist
- Sena Can (born 2001), Turkish sport shooter
- Sibel Can (born 1970), Turkish folk pop singer
- Şenol Can (born 1983), Turkish footballer
- Yasemin Can (born 1996), Turkish female long-distance runner of Kenyan origin
- Zülal Can (born 2009), Turkish female fencer

=== Cans ===
- Joacim Cans (born 1970), member of the Swedish band HammerFall
