= Djan Silveberg =

French artist

Djan Silveberg (born 1969 in Chambery, France) is a French visual artist.

He lives and works in France and Luxembourg.

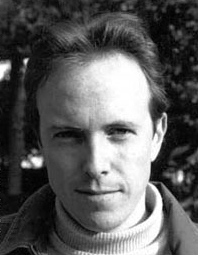
Djan Silveberg

== Biography ==
Djan Silveberg is a visual artist born in 1969. Djan Silveberg started his artistic career with ‘Quelques Vers de Rome’ presented in Lyon during the 1996 G7 Summit.

In 2009, he gave a new impulse to his creations by using different technics and media while pursuing his work on urban-like and contemporary society.

Since 2011 he took part in different contemporary art events in Europe, made several in situ interventions in Paris and Brussels, and had solo and group shows in various European art centers and galleries.

He lives and works in France and Luxembourg.

== Approach ==
Through his artwork he tries to cast an certain eye on the state of the world and on man's position in today's society (with all its attributes that some philosophers call hypermodern: hyper-individualism, hyperfinancial, hypermediatization, etc.); but also on behaviours coming from one's culture (education, arts, media, etc.) and environment (city, economy, etc.).

He likes to introduce some shifts of focus in the approach and processing in order to trigger reflection.

He uses various media and technics (i.e. installation, painting, sculpture, photography, performance, etc.).

== Some flagship works ==
- ‘Red District, an Artists Exhibition’: Created as part of Lyon's 2013 Festival of Lights, Djan Silveberg's performance showcased visual artists in individual boxes in the ‘Galerie des Pentes’ shop windows, bathed in red light as a reference to Amsterdam's red light district and opening discussion on the artists’ monetary dependency and freedom.
- ‘Arbeit Macht Frei / 03’: Organized during the 2015 Paris’ FIAC International Art Fair with 15 international artists (France, Spain, China, Germany, Argentina, Luxembourg), the Happening/Performance called ‘Arbeit Macht Frei / 03’ ("Work Sets You Free") is part of a series of art interventions on the concept of work and its value in a time of crisis and in a performance-based society. It led to a group show called ‘AMF/03’ that took place in Paris’ Galerie Hors-Champs at the beginning of 2016.
- ‘Le Vol’: By re-publishing under his own name Henri Barbusse’s novel ‘L’Enfer’ (the book became ‘Le Vol’ – ‘The Theft’), Djan Silveberg proposes a double reflection on our time: On one side the ‘voyeur-exhibitionist’ dialectic positioned as a basic rationale for today's TV programs; and on the other side a questioning on the obsolescence and property of the art work. The project was presented in the context of the 2015 Lyon Contemporary Art Biennial.

== Publications ==
Quelques Vers de Rome – MXMXCIV, Odes & Chimeres editions, 1997, ISBN 2-911795-00-8

Le Vol (roman du vingtième siècle), Odes & Chimeres editions, 2015, ISBN 2-911795-01-6

Corpus Delicti ("Le vol", projet artistique du vingtième-et-unième siècle), Odes & Chimeres editions, 2015, ISBN 2-911795-02-4
