= Franz Stiasny =

Franz Stiasny (1881–1941, in Poland) was an Austrian engraver who produced a large series of bronze portrait medals of important writers, musicians and historical personages in rectangular formats. Stiasny was best known for his portraits of famous composers. Various bronze medals were cast in Austria, c.1930.

The plaques measure mainly 54mm x 65mm and weigh 107gm.

== Sources ==
- Biographical Dictionary of Medallists: Coin, Gem, and Seal-engravers, Mint-masters, &c., Ancient and Modern, with References to Their Works, B.C. 500-A.D. 1900, compiled by Leonard Forrer, B. Franklin (1970) 8 vols., vol. 5, pgs. 684-5.
