= Jan (Persian name) =

Jan or Jaan (Persian: جان, romanized: jān, pronounced [dʒɑːn]) (Note: Colloquial Iranian Persian: جون, romanized: jūn, pronounced [dʒuːn].) or jaan is name of Persian origin meaning for 'soul' or 'life', also used as a diminutive suffix attached to names and expressing intimacy, with a meaning roughly equivalent to "darling, dear". It is commonly used in all Iranic languages and borrowed as a loanword in Azerbaijani, Armenian, Turkish, Urdu, Hindi and Bengali languages.

== Given name ==
- Jan Nisar Akhtar, Indian poet
- Jan Fishan Khan, Afghan warlord
- Jan Mohammad Jamali, Baluch Sardar
- Jan Muhammad Junejo, Khilafat Movement leader
- Jan Mohammed Khan, Afghan politician
- Jan Uddin, British-Bangladeshi actor and model

== Middle name ==
- Ahmed Jan Thirakwa, Indian musician
- Mohabbat Jan Chowdhury, Bangladeshi major general and minister
- Sarwar Jan Chowdhury, Bangladeshi former member of parliament
- Sarwar Jan Miah, Bangladeshi politician and lawyer

== Surname ==
- Ahmad Jan (Bagram detainee), Afghan detainee
- Ahmad Jan (Taliban governor), Afghan governor
- Hasan Jan (1938–2007), Pakistani assassinated Islamic scholar and politician
- Khwaja Yusuf Jan, Bengali aristocrat and politician
- Lalak Jan, Pakistani military personnel
- Masood Jan, Pakistani blind cricketer
- Mian Shakirullah Jan, Pashtun judge and member of the PCO Judges case protest
- Razia Jan (1944–2025), Afghan-American business owner and activist

== Variants ==
In Turkic languages, Jan is usually spelled Can (/dʒan ~ ʑan/) and is also used as a component in two-part names (Turkish: Berkecan, Tatar: Ğəlimcan / Галимҗан, etc.). When transliterated from Russian script, it is Dzhan (Джан), or alternatively, Zyan (Зян).

In Uzbek, Jan is Jon (Olimjon).

== See also ==
- Can (name)
- Jan (disambiguation)
