= Jan Dijkstra =

Dutch politician (1910–1993)

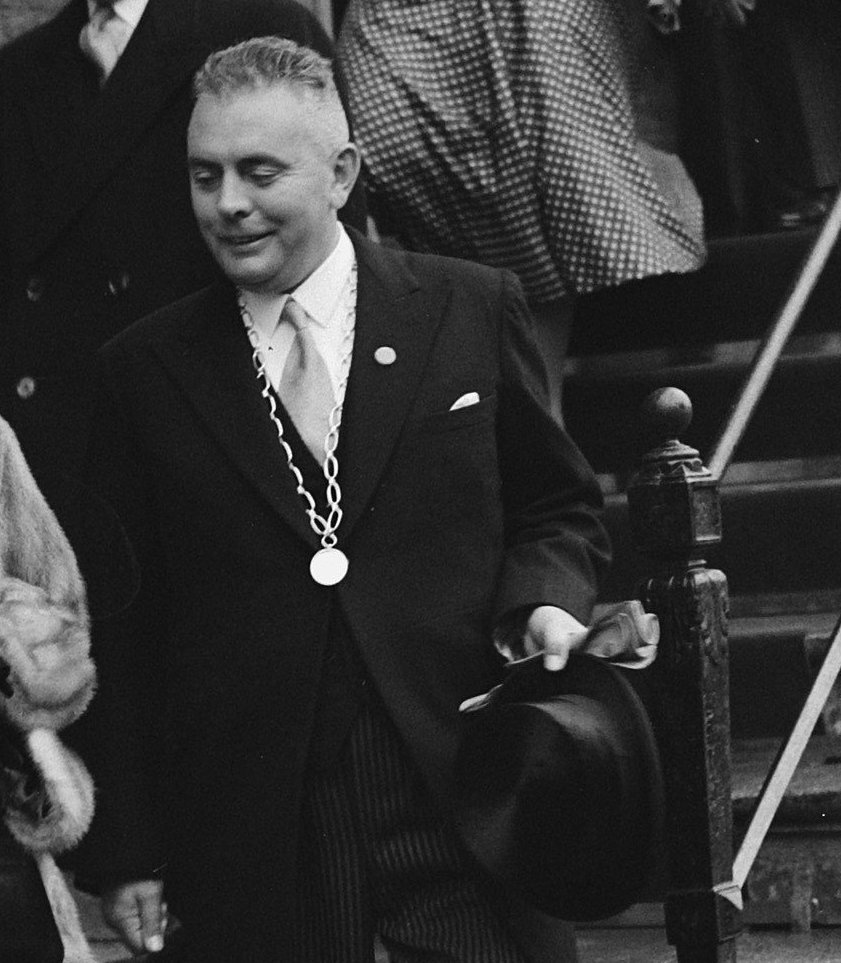
- Jan Dijkstra (1950)

Mayor of Franeker
- In office 1945–1975
- Preceded by: Kornelis van der Vlis
- Succeeded by: Jaap Pop

Personal details
- Born: 14 April 1910 Lemmer, Netherlands
- Died: 22 November 1993 (aged 83)
- Political party: Christelijk-Historische Unie
- Spouse: Trijntje Hornstra
- Children: 3

Jan Dijkstra (14 April 1910, Lemmer – 22 November 1993) was a Dutch politician.

He was a member of the Christelijk-Historische Unie.

For a few months in 1945, he was mayor of Wonseradeel. In December 1945, he succeeded Kornelis van der Vlis and as mayor of Franeker, and he served in that position until his retirement in May 1975. Dijkstra was succeeded by Jaap Pop as mayor of Franeker. Dijkstra married Trijntje Hornstra in 1934, and they had three children. Within the local community, Dijkstra's nickname was Jan Skoen.
