= Jaap Pop =

Dutch politician (1941–2026)

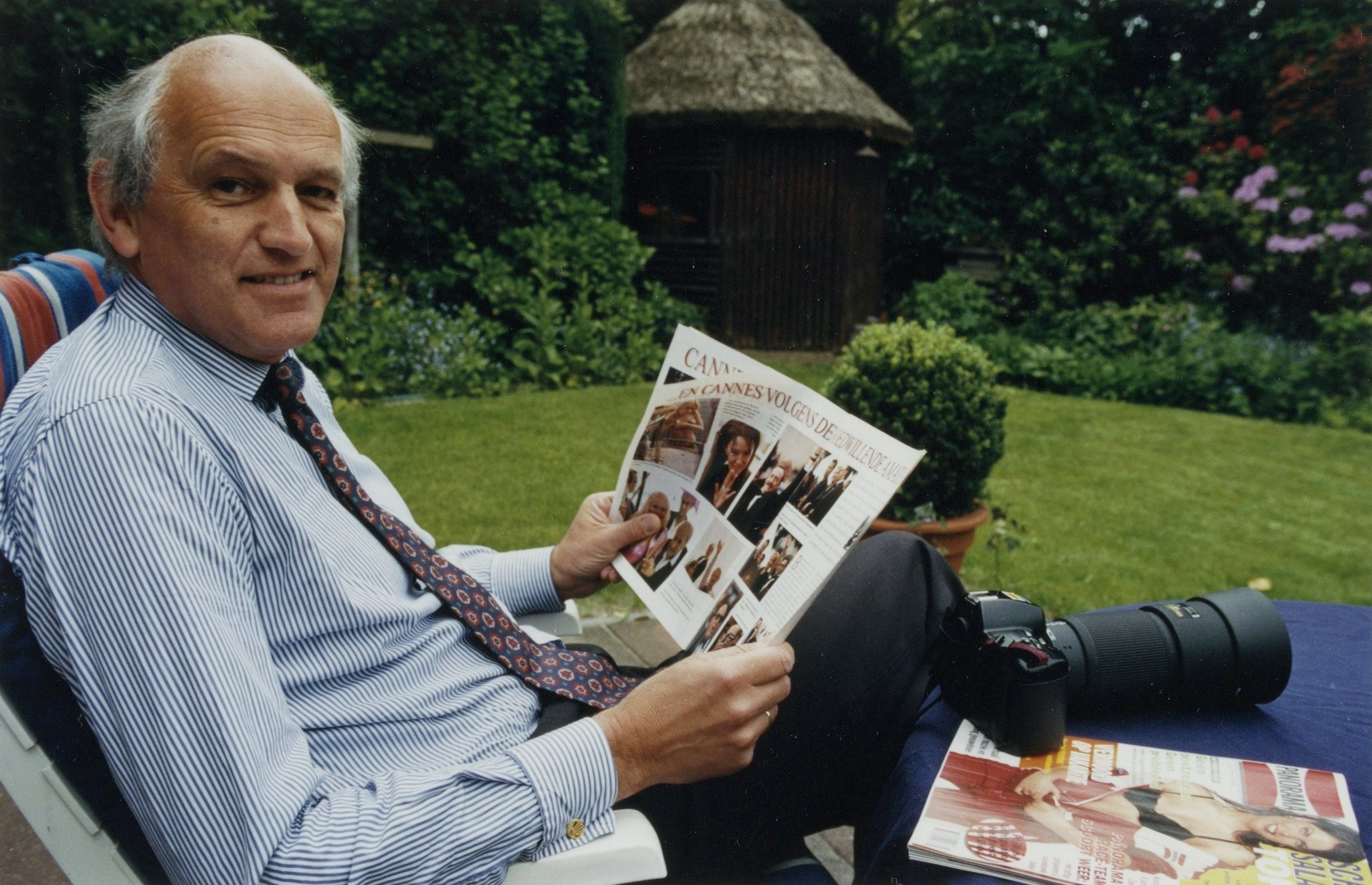
- Pop in 1997

Mayor of Franeker
- In office 1975–1981

Mayor of Tiel
- In office 1981–1988

Mayor of Alkmaar
- In office 1988–1995

Mayor of Haarlem
- In office 1995–2006

Personal details
- Born: Jacobus Johannes Hermanus Pop; 23 June 1941 Alphen aan den Rijn, German-occupied Netherlands
- Died: 6 January 2026 (aged 84) Haarlem, Netherlands
- Party: Labour Party
- Parent: Herman Pop (father)

Jacobus Johannes Hermanus "Jaap" Pop (23 June 1941 – 6 January 2026) was a Dutch politician. Pop was a member of the Labour Party.

== Early life ==
Pop was born in Alphen aan den Rijn on 23 June 1941. He was one of three sons of Herman Pop, who was a member of the Christian Historical Union party and served as mayor of Dinteloord between 1946 and 1973. Pop later studied jurisprudence in Utrecht.

== Career ==
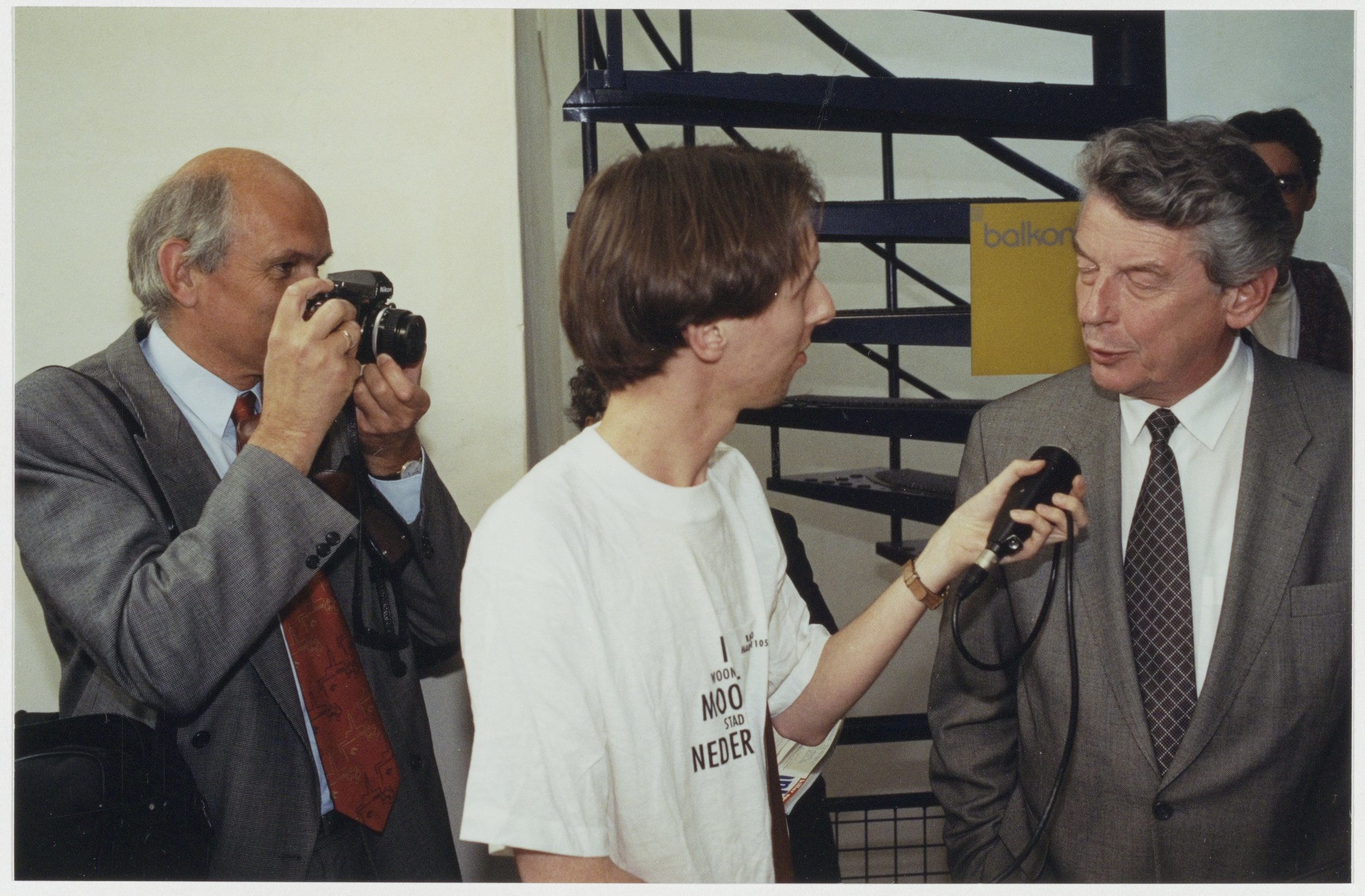
Pop (left), then the mayor of Haarlem, and Prime Minister Wim Kok (right) at a Labour party conference in Haarlem in 1995.

Pop served as mayor of several cities between 1975 and 2006. He succeeded Jan Dijkstra as mayor of Franeker in 1975. In 1981, he became the mayor of Tiel, serving in that position until 1988. He then was the mayor of Alkmaar between 1988 and 1995. In 1995, he succeeded Elizabeth Schmitz as mayor of Haarlem.

In 2004, he became Officer in the Order of Orange-Nassau. Pop retired in 2006 and was succeeded by Bernt Schneiders as mayor of Haarlem.

In 2008, he played the role of mayor in the film Ver van familie.

In 2016, Pop's work as mayor of Haarlem was part of an exhibition on Haarlem's mayors at Museum Haarlem, which also included former mayors Elizabeth Schmitz, Jan Reehorst, and Bernt Schneiders.

== Death ==
Pop died on 6 January 2026, at the age of 84.
