= Jan Matzoll =

German politician (born 1985)

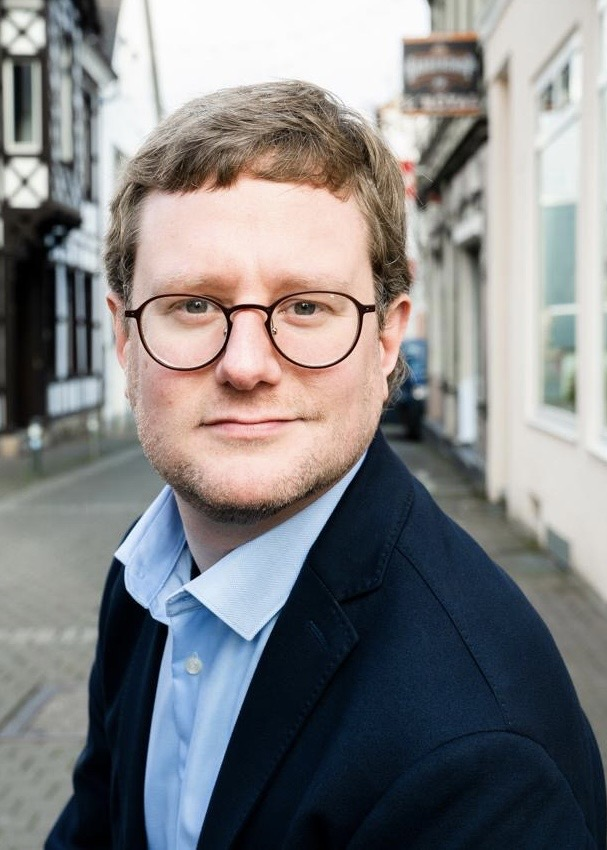
- Matzoll in 2021

Member of the Landtag of North Rhine-Westphalia
- Incumbent
- Assumed office 1 June 2022

Personal details
- Born: 29 August 1985 (age 41)
- Party: Alliance 90/The Greens (since 2009)

Jan Matzoll (née Keitsch; born 29 August 1985) is a German politician serving as a member of the Landtag of North Rhine-Westphalia since 2022. From 2021 to 2023, he served as spokesperson for animal welfare policy of Alliance 90/The Greens in North Rhine-Westphalia.
