= Jan Reehorst =

Dutch politician (1923–2024)

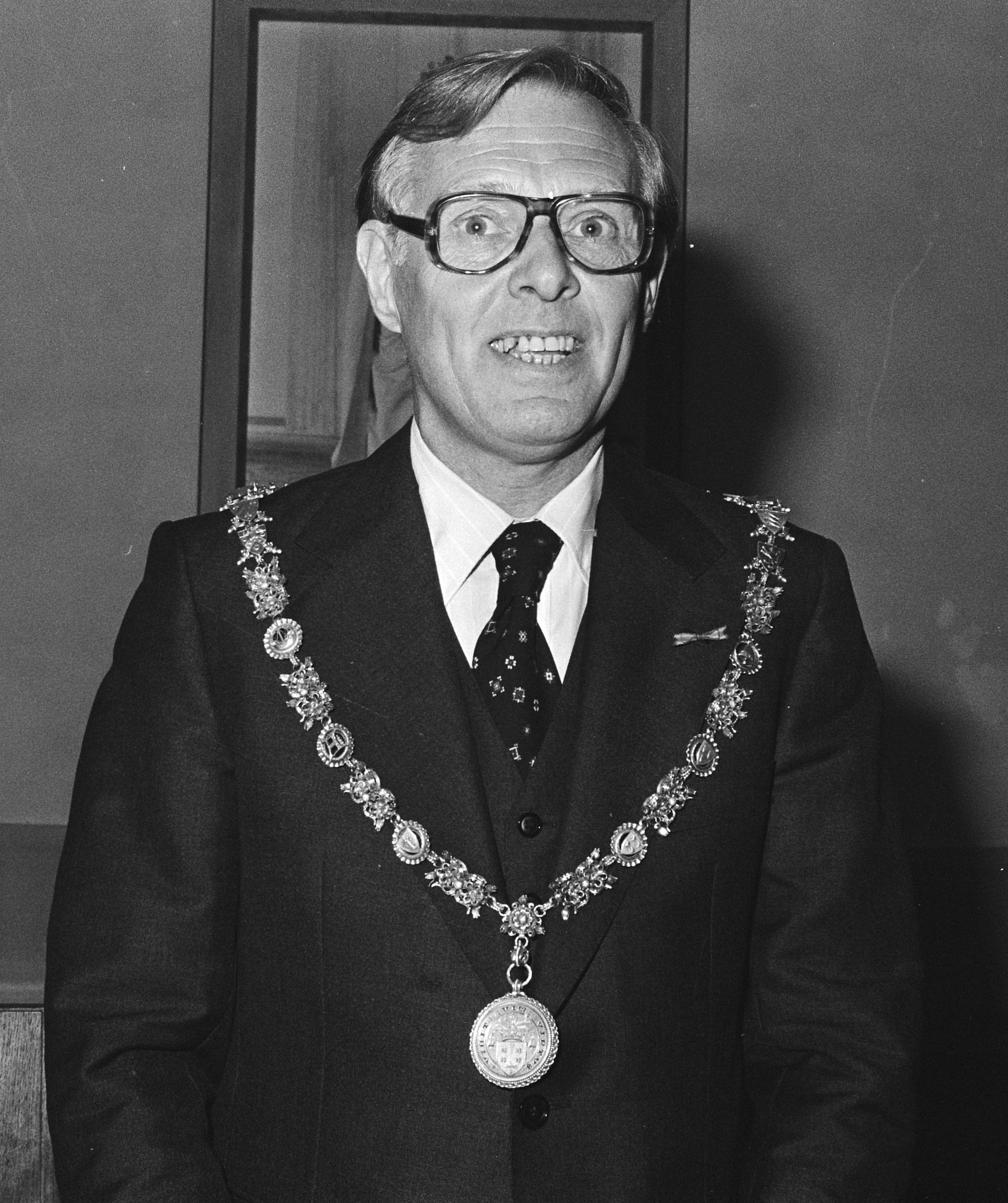
- Reehorst after becoming mayor of Haarlem in 1977

Municipal council of Rotterdam
- In office 1953–1973

House of Representatives
- In office 1956–1967

Mayor of Velsen
- In office 1973–1977

Mayor of Haarlem
- In office 1977–1984

Personal details
- Born: 21 March 1923 Rotterdam, Netherlands
- Died: 4 June 2024 (aged 101) Haarlem, Netherlands
- Party: Labour Party

Jan Reehorst (21 March 1923 – 4 June 2024) was a Dutch politician.

== Life and career ==
Reehorst became a member of the Labour Party in 1946. From 1953 until 1973, he was member of the municipal council of Rotterdam. Between 1956 and 1967, he was a member of the House of Representatives. In 1973, he became mayor of Velsen and from 1977 till 1984 he was mayor of Haarlem.

In 2013, he received the Willem Drees-penning award for 65 years of continuous membership of the Labour Party. In 2016, Reehorst's work as mayor of Haarlem was part of an exhibition on Haarlem's mayors at Museum Haarlem, which also included former mayors Elisabeth Schmitz, Jaap Pop, and Bernt Schneiders.

Reehorst turned 100 in March 2023, and died in Haarlem on 4 June 2024, at the age of 101.
