= Jan Koriath =

German politician (born 1990)

Member of the Hamburg Parliament
- Incumbent
- Assumed office 26 March 2025
- Constituency: Rotherbaum – Harvestehude – Eimsbüttel-Ost

Personal details
- Born: 1990 (age 35–36)
- Party: Alliance 90/The Greens

Jan Koriath (born 1990) is a German politician serving as a member of the Hamburg Parliament since 2025. He is the spokesperson for education and sports of the Alliance 90/The Greens Hamburg group in the Parliament.
