= Hendrik van Streek =

Dutch painter

Coordinates: 52°22′25.9″N 4°53′30.6″E

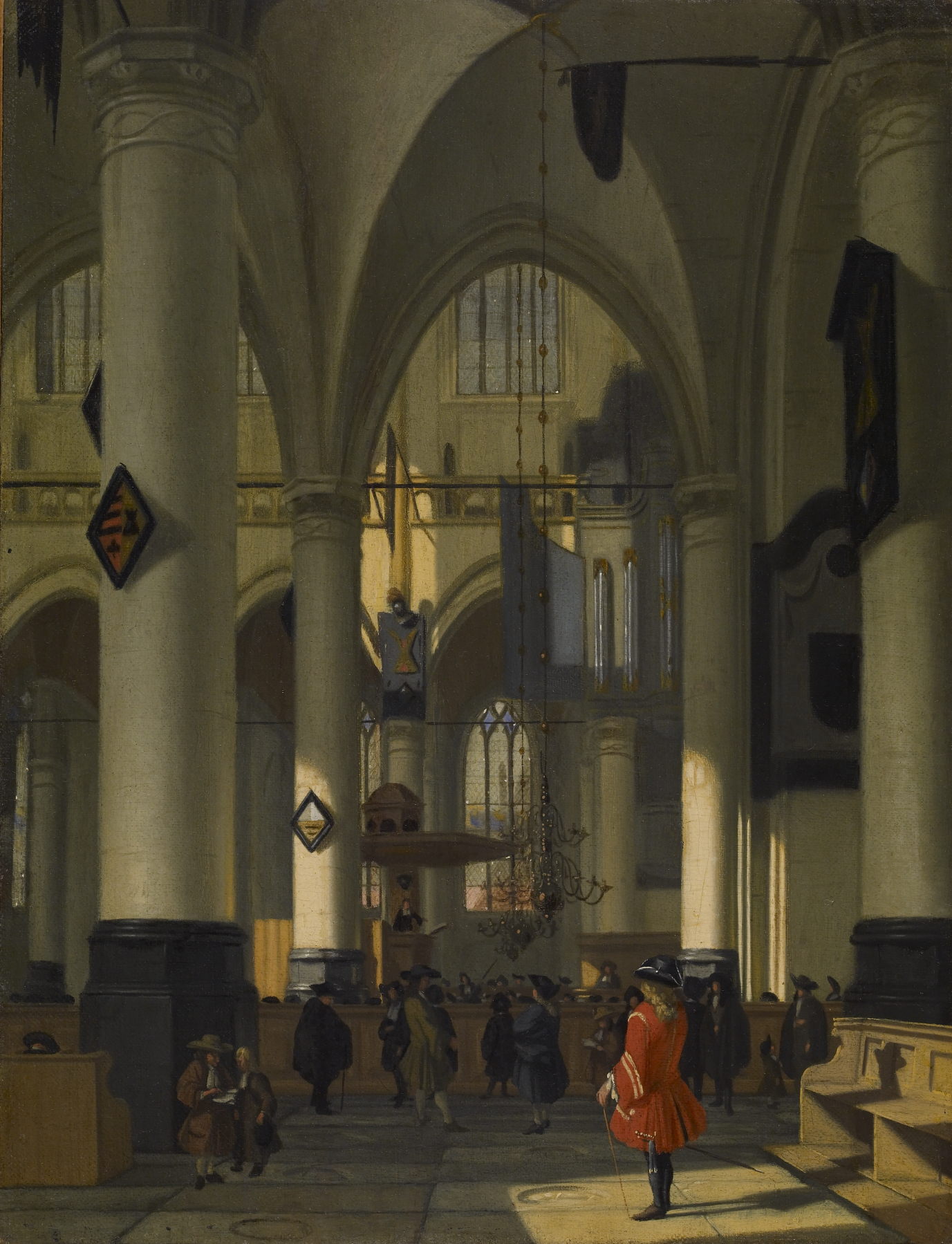
- View of the Old Church in Amsterdam, Walters Art Museum
- Born: 11 April 1659; Amsterdam
- Died: 19 November 1720 (aged 61)
- Known for: Painting
- Movement: Baroque

Hendrik van Streek or Hendrick van Streeck (baptized 11 April 1659 – buried 19 November 1720) was a Dutch painter and sculptor. He is known for his paintings of church interiors and still lifes.

== Biography ==
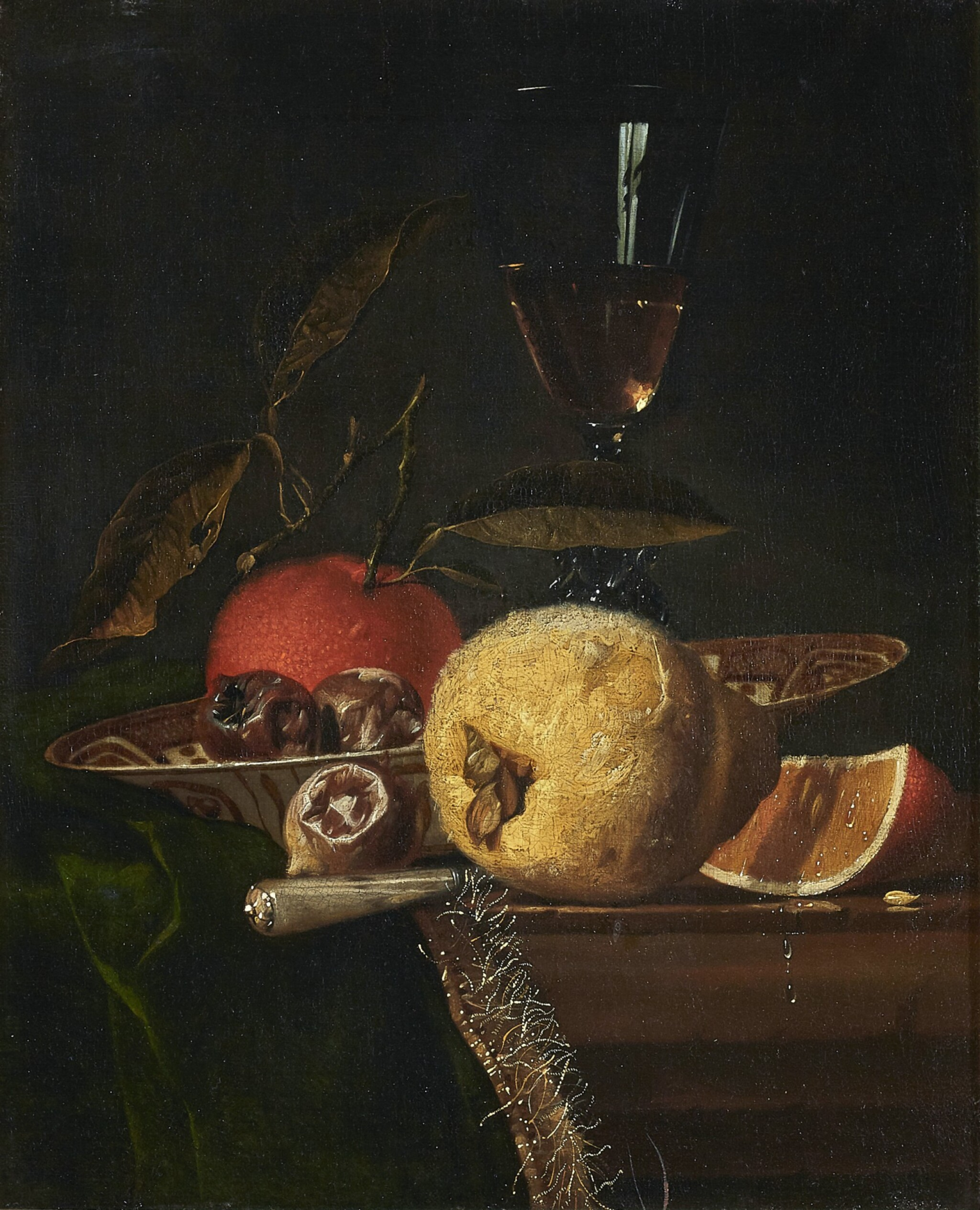
Still life with a quince, orange and other fruit

Hendrik was born in the Jordaan neighborhood of Amsterdam as the son of Grietje Cjaesdr. Klock and the painter Juriaen van Streeck, who later operated an inn in the Kerkstraat. After learning to draw from his father he studied sculpture with Willem van der Hoeven between 1672 and 1677. He married Maria van Hockom (c. 1683 – 1753) in Amsterdam on 19 March 1683. The couple had three children, of whom Coenraat van Streek became a sculptor.

According to the 18th century Dutch artist biographer Arnold Houbraken, after the death of his father in 1678 van Streek took up painting at the instigation of the animal painter Melchior d'Hondecoeter. He became a student of the painter of church interiors Emmanuel de Witte who came to live with him in his house in the Kerkstraat for a few months.

In 1696 he was involved in the decoration of the townhall in Alkmaar.

Hendrik was buried in the Nieuwe Kerk. His widow died in 1753.

== Work ==
Van Streek is mainly known for his church interiors and still life paintings of fruit and breakfast pieces. His church interiors are executed in a style very close to that of his master Emmanuel de Witte. His fruit still lifes are in the style of his father.
