= Erich Jahn =

Erich Jahn (born 23 July 1907, date of death unknown) was a leader of the Hitler Youth in Berlin. He was born in Berlin and as a teenager became a member of the Berlin youth organisation 'Bismarck Bund'. He later became involved in the Hitler Youth, playing a significant role in the organisation at both a local and a national level. He became a member of the Nazi Party in 1929. He was a close associate of Reichsjugendführer Baldur von Schirach.
