= Juriaen van Streeck =

Dutch Golden Age painter

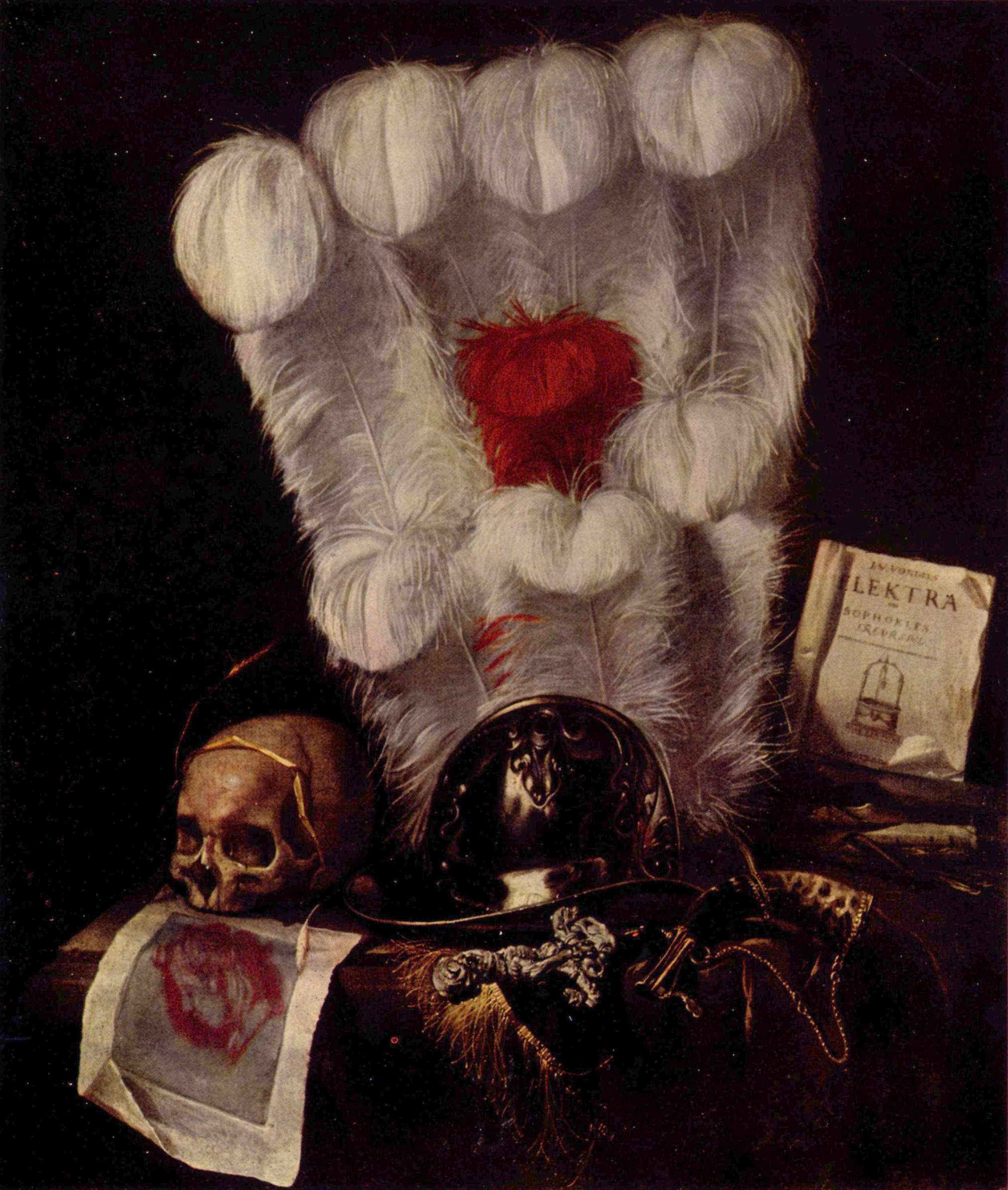
- Vanitas: still life with feather fan..
- Born: Juriaen van Streeck; 1632; Amsterdam
- Died: 1687 (aged 54–55); Amsterdam
- Known for: Painting
- Movement: Baroque

Juriaen van Streeck or Juriaan van Streek (29 February 1632, in Amsterdam – buried 12 June 1687, in Amsterdam) was a Dutch Golden Age painter of still lifes.

Juriaen van Streek was born in the year 1632 in Amsterdam, Netherlands. In 1653 he married Grietje Claes. The couple lived in several locations in the Jordaan then moved to Prinsengracht. They had nine children, three were buried young. When Van Streeck died he was an innkeeper in Kerkstraat.

According to Houbraken, Van Streeck excelled at all still life subjects, including helmets, books, letters, musical instruments, and skulls or dead animals to indicate the transience of life.

He was a follower of Willem Kalf and influenced Barend van der Meer.

Houbraken also wrote an entry for his son Hendrick van Streeck, who became a student of Emanuel de Witte and painted church interiors.
