= Jan Kefer =

Czech astrologer and hermeticist

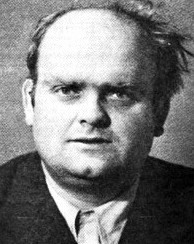
- Born: 31 January 1906; Nový Bydžov, Bohemia, Austria-Hungary
- Died: 3 December 1941 (aged 35); Flossenbürg concentration camp

Jan Kefer (31 January 1906 – 3 December 1941) was a Czech astrologer, hermeticist and publicist. He was the chairman of Universalia, a society of Czech hermeticists.

== Biography ==
Jan Kefer was born in Nový Bydžov on 31 January 1906. Kefer's father was from Bavaria. There is a legend that he was born blind, but in fact he only has had low vision in one eye in his childhood. In Prague he studied at the Archbishop Gymnasium in the classroom of famous mystic Jaroslav Ovečka. He became a novice at Strahov Monastery, but later left the order. He graduated from Charles University in Prague with a degree in arts.

Kefer practised astrology, kabbalah, ceremonial magic, alchemy and theurgy. He wrote many works about astrology and hermetism, and regularly discoursed on these themes in the Universalia Society. He also translated many meaningful books into Czech language, including Bardo Thödol or the books of Eliphas Lévi.

Kefer worked as a librarian of the National Museum in Prague and later as a librarian of Strahov Monastery and in the library of the Vatican. He was longtime secretary and later president of the society of Czechoslovak hermeticists, Universalia, and editor of Logos journal.

Perhaps Kefer's most famous act was performing three magick rituals against Adolf Hitler, with the aim of killing him. He was arrested on 18 June 1941 by the Gestapo, who offered him a place as Hitler's personal astrologist or participation in his astrological team, but he refused. Jan Kefer died in Flossenbürg concentration camp on 3 December 1941.
