= Stefan Szczesny =

German painter

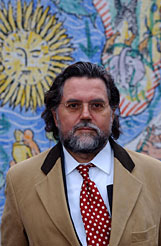
- Stefan Szczesny 2008
- Born: Stefan Szczesny; 9 April 1951 (age 75); Munich, West Germany
- Known for: Painting, drawing, sculpture, printmaking, ceramics
- Notable work: The Living Planet (2000)
- Movement: Expressionism, Neue Wilde
- Website: www.stefan-szczesny.com

Stefan Szczesny (born 9 April 1951) is a German painter, draughtsman, and sculptor. He is best known for co-founding the Neue Wilde movement in the early 1980s.

== Biography ==
=== 1951–1994 ===
Stefan Szczesny was born in Munich as the son of the philosopher and publisher Gerhard Szczesny and his wife Martha Meuffel, a theatre producer. Upon attending primary and secondary schools in Munich, he acquired his first training as a painter at a private art school in Munich (1967–1969). From 1969 to 1975, he studied at the Academy of Fine Arts in Munich. His mentor there was the abstract painter Günter Fruhtrunk. During this time, he also attended lectures in art history and philosophy at LMU Munich and worked as a freelance art critic.

Under the influence of his mentor Fruhtrunk Szczesny experimented in these years with abstract and minimalist art. A major turn-about occurred in 1975–76, when Szczesny was in Paris on a scholarship of the German Academic Exchange Service. The encounter there with the paintings of Delacroix caused Szczesny to rethink abstract and minimalist tenets and to return, eventually, to figuration.

The break was not immediate: in 1979, for instance, he exhibited relatively abstract paintings at the Kunstforum of the Städtische Galerie im Lenbachhaus; many of the works created during a stay at the Villa Romana in Florence in 1980, too, display abstract features. Nonetheless, it was as a figurative painter that Szczesny eventually gained wide public attention, in particular as the organiser of, and participant in, the 1981 exhibition Rundschau Deutschland. Rundschau Deutschland brought together works of a number of young German-speaking figurative painters who later came to be known as the Neue Wilde.

Szczesny was one of the protagonists of the Neue Wilde. In 1982, he participated in a number of "Neue Wilde"-related exhibitions, such as "5 aus Köln" ("5 from Cologne", with Walter Dahn, Jiri Dokoupil, Gerhard Kever and Andreas Schulze) and "Die neue Künstlergruppe Die wilde Malerei" ("The new group of painters: Wild painting"), both in Cologne. From 1984 to 1988, he edited the journal "Malerei. Peinture. Painting", which offered an important forum for the new figurative painters.

More than other Neue Wilde painters, however, Szczesny was (and still is) interested in art historical tradition. In a 1985 interview, for instance, Szczesny remarked: "If Cézanne paints Bathers, whom Titian, Delacroix and Courbet had painted before, and Renoir paints them and Picasso paints them again, and Matisse paints them again, then Szczesny, too, paints them again!" It is in line with this declaration that in 1982/83, the year after the Neue Wilden explosion, Szczesny – in Rome at the time, as the recipient of the Rome Prize of the Prussian Academy of Arts – turned his attention to the roots of European art. He created a series of "Roman paintings" exploring the world of Greco-Roman myth. Similarly, in 1984 he created a number of paintings focusing on the (Ovidian) theme of metamorphosis; these were exhibited in one of Szczesny's largest early exhibitions, alongside ancient sculpture at the Glyptothek and Staatliche Antikensammlung in Munich.

The first comprehensive retrospective of Szczesny's work followed in 1988, curated by Klaus Honneff at the Rheinisches Landesmuseum in Bonn.

In late 80s and early 90s, Szczesny's work was shown in many exhibitions. The artist, during these years, discovered his love of the Caribbean, evinced for instance in his Jamaica paintings of 1990. But Szczesny was engaged in other projects, too. For instance, he painted a series of portraits of personal "culture heroes", from Bach to James Joyce, Marcel Proust, Glenn Gould and Jimi Hendrix. He also created comprehensive stage designs (e.g. for Gert Pfafferodt's production of Schiller's "Kabale und Liebe").

=== 1994–2001 ===
In 1994, Szczesny relocated to New York, setting up his studio at 12 Warren Street. The exposure to the New York art scene (post Andy Warhol) had an important effect on the artist. He began better to understand art as a professional business. One of the results was the founding, in 1996, of the "Szczesny Factory". The Factory is modelled on the large-scale workshops of the Italian Renaissance and Warhol's Factory. It has since allowed him wide-ranging activities, including book publications, architectural projects and collaborations with fashion labels (such as Escada).

Two major art projects implemented during these years (and in the Szczesny Factory framework) were the "Kempinski Art Project" in 1998, which involved the comprehensive artistic design of the Kempinski Hotel Bahia in Estepona/Marbella; and the "Living Planet" art project at the Expo 2000 in Hanover, which involved the creation of twelve painted murals, with dimensions of H 300 x W 830 cm each, depicting a map of life and suggesting the importance of protecting endangered species.

In the mid-90s, Szczesny also began visiting the island of Mustique. He has travelled there regularly since and has created a number of Mustique-inspired paintings. His relation to Mustique is documented in his book on Mustique (2002).

=== 2001–2010 ===
In 2001, Szczesy moved to Saint-Tropez in South France. In view of Szczesny's love of nature and the Mediterranean. In taking it, he also continued the tradition of painters such as Paul Signac or Henri Matisse who had lived and worked in Saint-Tropez.

In 2001/02, Szczesy spent some time in a studio in Seville, Spain, where he created a number of Flamenco-inspired artworks. In 2002, a film documenting his achievements ("Szczesny – The film", directed by the Austro-American director Curt Faudon) was presented at the 55th Cannes Film Festival. In 2005, Szczesny began producing his so-called "shadow sculptures", cut from black steel plates and depicting lush vegetation and sensual female figures as symbols of life. In 2007, the exhibition "Mainau – The dream of an earthly paradise" offered a comprehensive overview of Szczesny's wide-ranging artistic output. On the occasion, Szczesny transformed Mainau island into a total work of art, creating a large number of ceramics in various shapes and sizes, large glass stelae and many other objects, including a bridge and a painted zeppelin NT. In 2008, Szczesny began work on a series of "golden paintings"; in these, Szczesny uses the powerful symbol that is gold and its associations with bounty and glory to celebrate life's beauty. In 2010, Szczesny opened his large new studio in Saint-Tropez.

=== 2011–2017 ===
In 2011, Szczesny began to collaborate with the car company Jaguar, as the company's brand ambassador. The collaboration has allowed the artist to realise major art projects. In 2011, Jaguar presented an exhibition of Szczesny's shadow sculptures in St. Moritz, on Sylt and in Saint-Tropez. In 2012, around a large number of sculptures, ceramics and paintings were shown in Frankfurt (and in particular in Frankfurt's Palmengarten).

In 2014, a retrospective of the work of Stefan Szczesny is hosted at the Palais des Papes in Avignon.

In 2017 the Citadelle de Saint-Tropez hosted a comprehensive sculpture retrospective 2005–2017 by Stefan Szczesny.

=== 2020 ===
The Szczesny Art Foundation Saint-Tropez was established in 2020. It is a non-profit foundation recognised under French law, based in Saint-Tropez and is devoted to the promotion, preservation and research of the work of Stefan Szczesny.

== Exhibitions ==
=== Single exhibitions (selection) ===
- 1976 Goethe-Institut, Paris, France
- 1979 "Seven Paintings", Städtische Galerie im Lenbachhaus, Kunstforum München, Munich, Germany
- 1980 "Perspektiven '80", Art II, Basel, Switzerland
- 1981 "Works on paper 1977–81", Galerie Friedrich and Knust, Munich, Germany
- 1983 "Immagini Romane", Villa Massimo, Rome, Italy
- 1984 "Metamorphoses", Glyptothek und Staatliche Antikensammlung, Munich, Germany
- 1985 "Paintings and works on paper", Kunstverein Pforzheim, Reuchlinhaus, Germany
- 1988 "Szczesny 1978–1987", Rheinisches Landesmuseum, Bonn, Germany
- 1989 "Works on paper", Goethe Institut, Madrid, Spain
- 1990 "Paintings and works on paper 1969–1989", Kunstverein Mannheim, Germany
- 1991 "Portraits (Idols – Myths – Models)", Kunstverein Heidelberg, Germany
- 1992 "L’annunziazione della Pittura", Arte Contemporanea Hirmer & Museo Comunale, Greve/Chianti, Italy
- 1992 "Portraits", Kunsthalle Bremen, Germany
- 1993 "Caribbean Style", Neue Galerie der Stadt Linz, Austria (later at Lok Gallery, New York)
- 1994 "Portraits", Nikki Diana Marquardt Gallery, Paris, France
- 1994 "Portraits of Musicians", Kölner Philharmonie, Cologne, Germany
- 1996 "Eva dancing with the mirror", Fassbender Fine Art, Chicago, USA
- 1997 "Szczesny, 1975–1996", Haus am Lützowplatz, Berlin, Germany
- 1997 Ceramics, Badisches Landesmuseum, Karlsruhe, Germany
- 1997 Paintings and ceramics, Gerhard-Marcks-Haus, Bremen, Germany
- 1998 „Szczesny – Côte d’Azur", Kunsthalle Emden, Germany
- 1998 "La joie de vivre", Museo del Grabado Español Contemporáneo, Marbella, Spain
- 1999 "Côte d‘Azur", Museum Moderner Kunst, Wörlen – Passau, Germany
- 1999 "Painting meets photography", Fondazione Levi, Venice, Italy
- 1999 "Szczesny. Côte d'Azur", Espace Bonnard, Le Cannet/Cannes, France
- 2000 "The Living Planet", Expo 2000, Hanover, Germany
- 2001 "Luxe, calme et volupté ... ou la joie de vivre", Centre d’art La Malmaison, Cannes, France
- 2003 "A feast for the eyes", Gustav-Lübcke-Museum, Hamm, Germany
- 2004 "Mediterráneo – La Estética del Sur", Ses Voltes–Centre d’Exposicions, Palma de Mallorca, Spain
- 2005 "Images érotiques", Kunsthalle Mannheim, Germany
- 2007 „The dream of an earthly paradise", Insel Mainau, Germany
- 2007 Painting on photography & sculptures, Villa Aurélienne, Fréjus, France
- 2008 Ceramic sculptures, Villa Domergue, Cannes, France
- 2010 "Szczesny diary: St. Tropez, New York, Mustique", 532 Gallery Thomas Jaeckel, New York, USA
- 2011 Shadow sculptures in Saint-Tropez, Ville de Saint-Tropez, France
- 2011 Sculptures and paintings, Kunsthalle Worpswede, Germany
- 2011 Sculptures and paintings, Künstlerhaus am Lenbachplatz, Munich, Germany
- 2012 "Szczesny in Frankfurt" & "Kunstgarten Palmengarten", Stadt Frankfurt und Palmengarten Frankfurt, Germany
- 2013 "Blühende Welten", Schloss Sigmaringen, Sigmaringen, Germany
- 2014 "Métamorphoses méditerranéennes", Retrospective, Palais des papes, Avignon, France
- 2017 „Sculptures 2005–2017“, Retrospective, Citadelle, Saint-Tropez
- 2019 "Szczesny aux Baux-de-Provence", Les Baux-de-Provence
- 2020 Media co-operation with ntv Inside Art: Stefan Szczesny – Painter, Magician and the sea with Wolfram Kons
- 2021 "Stefan Szczesny paintings and sculptures under the sun of Saint-Tropez", Salle Jean Despas
- 2022 "Szczesny Art Project", Grimaud
- 2022 "Kitz Alps Art Project", 27 December 2022 – 23 April 2023, Kitzbühel, Austria
- 2023 Lavoir Vasserot, 4–10 May, Saint-Tropez
- 2023 "Szczesny: Sailing #Art4GlobalGoals", 9–11 June 2023, Geneva
- 2023 "Szczesny Painting Paradise", 1 July – 3 September 2023, Kunsthaus Artes, Berlin

=== Group exhibitions (selection) ===
- 1976 "Les Grands et les Jeunes", Petit Palais, Paris, France
- 1980 Jürgen Ponto Foundation, Frankfurt am Main, Germany
- 1980 XIIth Festival International de la Peinture, Cagnes-sur-Mer, France
- 1980 "Art and critics", Kunstverein München, Munich, Germany
- 1981 "Rundschau Deutschland", Cologne and Munich, Germany
- 1982 "5 aus Köln" (mit Walter Dahn, Jiri Georg Dokoupil, Gerard Kever und Andreas Schulze), Six Friedrich Galerie, Munich, Germany
- 1982 "Die neue Künstergruppe: Wilde Malerei" (mit Anzinger, Dahn, Dokoupil), Im Klapperhof, Cologne, Germany
- 1982 "Variationen und Sequenzen", Kunstmuseum Düsseldorf, Germany
- 1984 "Zwischenergebnis: Neue Deutsche Malerei", Neue Galerie am Landesmuseum Johanneum Graz, Austria
- 1987 "Skulpturen von Malern", Kunstverein Mannheim, Mannheim, Germany
- 1987 "Beelden van Schilders", Museum van Bommel van Dam, Venlo, Netherlands
- 1987 "Made in Cologne", DuMont Kunsthalle, Cologne, Germany
- 1987 "A Propos de dessin" (with Allington, Fletcher, Kounellis et al. ), Maeght Gallery, Paris, France
- 1991 "A Dialogue of Images", Contemporary American and German Painting, Galerie Pfefferle, Munich, Germany
- 1991 "Artists support Roma", Anzinger, Dahn, Dokoupil, Kasseböhmer, Szczesny, Trockel, Kunststation St. Peter, Cologne, Germany
- 1998 Venezia Aperto Vetro – International New Glass, 16. Oktober, Venice, Italy
- 1998 "Elvira Bach & Stefan Szczesny", Vetri e Dipinti – Paintings und Glas Sculptures, Galeria Luchetta, Murano (Venedig)
- 1998 "CologneKunst", Kunsthalle Köln, Cologne, Germany
- 2000 "Il Paradiso", Neue Galerie der Stadt Linz, Linz, Austria
- 2000 "De la couleur et du feu", Céramiques d‘artistes de 1885 à nos jours, Musée de la Faïence, Château Pastré, Marseille, France
- 2002 "paper art 8: Turbulences in Paper", Leopold Hoesch Museum, Düren, Germany
- 2007 Art Seasons Cape Town, 4.2 -4.3, Cape Town, South Africa
- 2010 „Stilleben", Stefan Szczesny and Elvira Bach, Galerie Voigt, Nuremberg, Germany
- 2014 "De l’expressivité primitive au regard inspiré", Centre d’art La Malmaison, Cannes, France

== Bibliography ==
=== Publications by Stefan Szczesny (selection) ===
- (ed.) Malerei. Painting. Peinture (Art journal), Edition Pfefferle, 1984–88
- (ed.) Maler über Malerei, DuMont, Cologne 1989

=== Publications about Stefan Szczesny (selection) ===
- 1981: Doris Schmidt, "Die zornigen Dreißigjährigen" (about Rundschau Deutschland), Süddeutsche Zeitung, 14/15 March 1981
- 1981: Helmut Schneider, "Pubertierende Malerei" (about Rundschau Deutschland), Die Zeit, 20 March 1981
- 1981: Wolfgang Max Faust, "'Du hast keine Chance. Nutze Sie!' With it and against it. Tendencies in recent German art", in Artforum International, September 1981
- 1984: Stephan Schmidt-Wulffen, "Erotisches Spiel mit dem Schattenmann", art 8/1984
- 1985: Hanns Theodor Flemming, "Szczesny: Badende", Weltkunst 12 (Juni 1985)
- 1992: Donald Kuspit, "Stefan Szczesny – DuMont Hall", Artforum 11/1992
- 1995: Marie-Luise Syring, "La peinture au tournant", artpress spécial No. 16
- 1997: Peter Schmitt, "Stefan Szczesny – Gefäße und Skulpturen", Neue Keramik 11/1997
- 2005: Ruth Händler, "Den Blumenstrauß malen", Handelsblatt 25–27 February 2005
- 2014: Patrick Le Fur, "Stefan Szczesny – La joie de vivre et de créer", Art Passion No. 38

=== Books and exhibition catalogues (selection) ===
- 1988: Klaus Honnef et al. (ed.), Stefan Szczesny. Bilder 1978–1987, Rheinland Verlag, Cologne, ISBN 3-7927-1006-4
- 1991: Wilfried Dickhoff (ed.), Szczesny. Portraits 1989–1991. Idole – Mythen – Leitbilder, Harenberg Verlag, ISBN 3-611-00254-2
- 1995: Donald Kuspit, Szczesny. DuMont Kunstbuchverlag, Cologne 1995, ISBN 3-7701-3399-4
- 1997: Szczesny. Skulpturen und Keramik, exhibition catalogue, Gerhard Marcks-Haus, Bremen, ISBN 3-924412-27-8
- 1998: Achim Sommer (ed.) Szczesny. Côte d'Azur, exhibition catalogue, Kunsthalle Emden, Cantz Verlag, Ostfildern
- 2000: Szczesny, The Living Planet, WWF/Expo 2000, Szczesny Factory, Cologne, ISBN 3-00-006163-0
- 2001: Frédéric Ballester (ed.), Szczesny. Luxe, calme et volupté ... ou la joie de vivre, exhibition catalogue, Centre d'art La Malmaison, Cannes
- 2002: Szczesny. Mustique, teNeues Verlag, Kempen, ISBN 3-8238-5591-3
- 2004: Szczesny. Catalogue raisonné of prints, 1981–2003, Szczesny Factory & Publishing GmbH Berlin, Berlin, ISBN 3-9808881-3-4
- 2005: Rolf Lauter (ed.), Szczesny. Images érotiques, Edition Braus im Wachter Verlag, Cologne, ISBN 3-89904-161-5
- 2007: Andreas Lück (ed.), Szczesny Insel Mainau. Ein Traum vom irdischen Paradies, Prestel Verlag, Munich, ISBN 978-3-7913-3916-0
- 2009: Andreas Lück (ed.), Szczesny. Saint-Tropez, Szczesny Factory & Publishing GmbH Berlin, Berlin, ISBN 978-3-9808881-8-9
- 2011: Frédéric Ballester, Szczesny. Méditerranée. L'esprit du sud, Szczesny Factory & Publishing & Gallery GmbH Berlin, Berlin, 2011, ISBN 978-3-9813406-4-8
- 2012: Donald Kuspit, Szczesny: Neue Wilden works from the 80s. Szczesny Factory & Publishing GmbH Berlin, Berlin, ISBN 978-3-9813406-8-6
- 2014: Szczesny. Métamorphoses méditerranénnes, exhibition catalogue, Palais des Papes, Avignon, Szczesny Factory & Publishing GmbH Berlin, Berlin, ISBN 978-3-9813406-6-2
- 2015: Szczesny. Best of Saint-Tropez, Szczesny Factory & Publishing GmbH Berlin, Berlin, ISBN 978-3-9813406-7-9
