= Jan Halvor Vaag Endrerud =

Norwegian politician (born 1996)

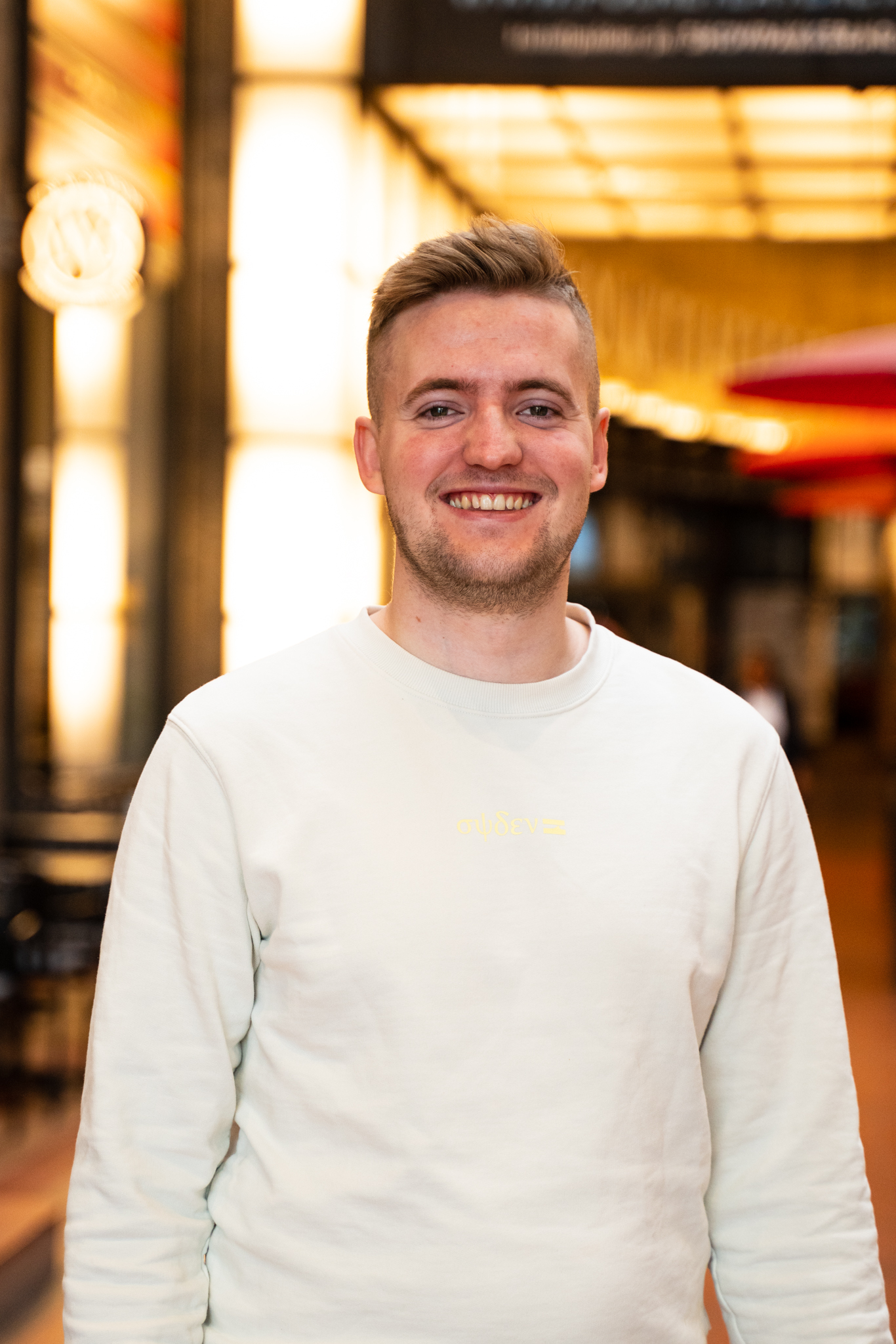
- Endrerud in 2022

Deputy Member of the Storting
- In office 2 October 2017 – 30 September 2021
- Constituency: Oppland

Personal details
- Born: 7 January 1996 (age 30)
- Party: Labour (since 2010)

Jan Halvor Vaag Endrerud (born 7 January 1996) is a Norwegian politician who served as secretary general of the Workers' Youth League from 2022 to 2026. From 2017 to 2021, he was a deputy member of the Storting.
