= Alexander Peskov =

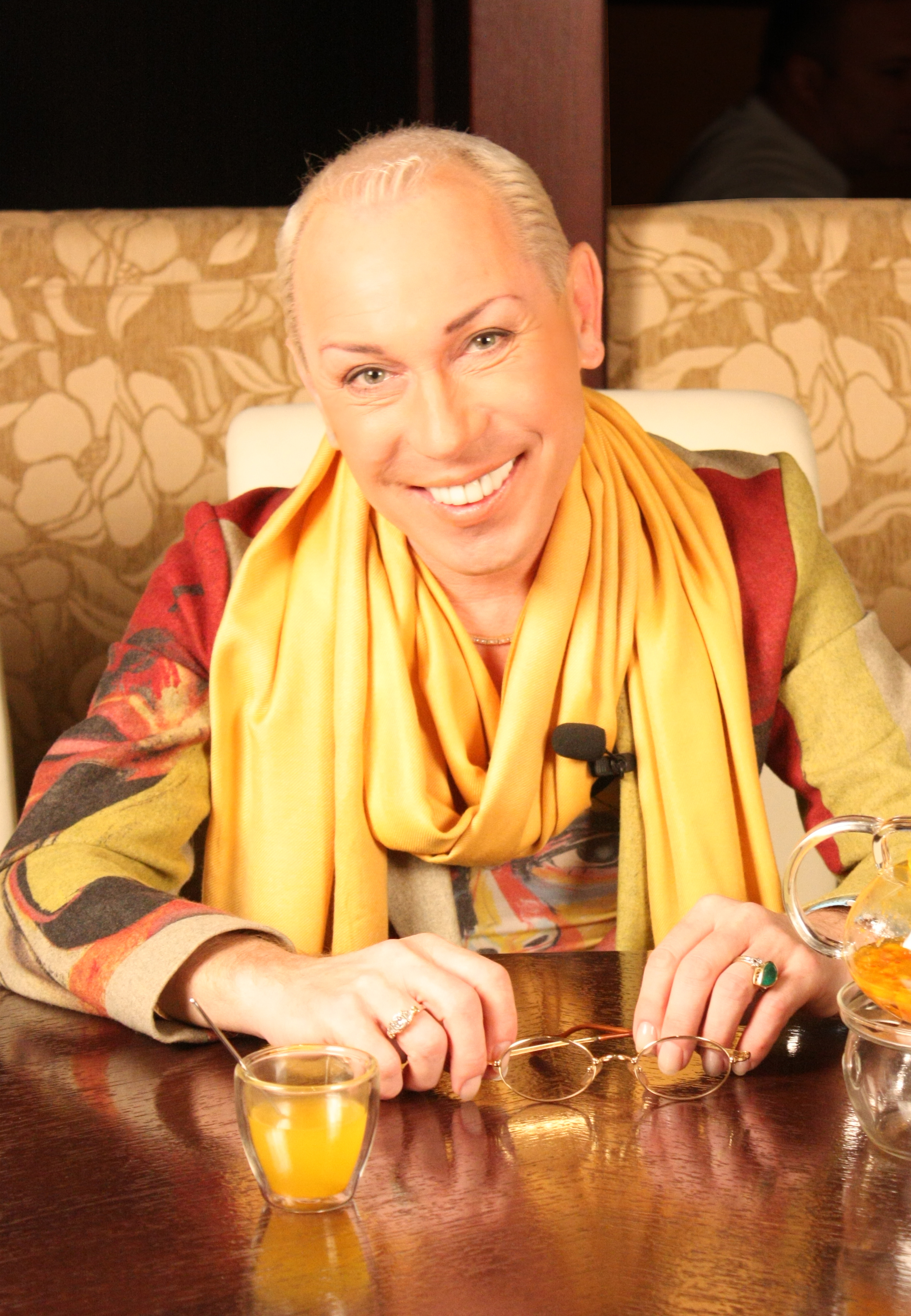
Alexander Peskov, 2010

Alexander Valeryanovich Peskov (Russian: Алекса́ндр Валерья́нович Песко́в); born 13 February 1962, Koryazhma, Arkhangelsk Oblast, RSFSR, USSR) is a Russian popular entertainer. The artist calls his work synchro-buffoonery.

In the Russian media, Alexander Peskov, often referred to as King of Parody.
