= Cinema Palace =

Movie theatre in Bangladesh

- Interactive map of Cinema Palace
- Former names: Theater Hall
- Address: Chittagong; Bangladesh
- Location: KC Dey Road
- Coordinates: 22.3379°N 91.8358°E
- Owner: Abul Hossain
- Event: Theater

Construction
- Built: 1928
- Closed: 2023
- Years active: 1940-2023

Cinema Palace was an old movie theatre in Chittagong, Bangladesh. It was formally known as Theater Hall.

== History ==
In 1928, before the independence during the British rule in India, Cinema Palace started as a Theater Hall in Chittagong. Later in 1943, the hall was converted into the Cinema Palace Theatre. In September 2023, Cinema Palace was announced to be closed due to unsafe buildings.
