= Yann =

Yann is a French unisex given name, specifically, the Breton form of "Jean" (French for "John").

Notable persons with the name Yann include:

== In arts and entertainment ==
- Yann Martel (born 1963), Canadian author
- Yann Moix (born 1968), French author, film director and television presenter
- Yann Peifer (born 1974), German disc-jockey
- Yann Queffélec (born 1949), French author
- Yann Tiersen (born 1970), French musician
- Yann Tomita (born 1952), Japanese musician
- La Grande Dame (Yann Martin), French musician

== In politics and activism ==
- Yann Fouéré (1910–2011), French activist, Breton nationalist
- Yann Goulet (1914–1999), French activist, Breton nationalist
- Yann Le Pen (born 1963), French politician, daughter of French politician Jean-Marie Le Pen
- Yann Piat (1949 –1994), French politician
- Yann Wehrling (born 1971), French politician

== In sports ==
- Yann Aurel Bisseck (born 2000), German footballer
- Yann Bodiger (born 1995), French footballer
- Yann Boé-Kane (born 1991), French footballer
- Yann Clairay (born 1983), French racing driver
- Yann Cucherat (born 1979), French gymnast
- Yann Danis (born 1981), Canadian ice hockey player
- Yann David (born 1988), French rugby union player
- Yann Delaigue (born 1973), French rugby union player
- Yann Ekra (born 1990), French-Ivorian footballer
- Yann Jouffre (born 1984), French footballer
- Yann Kermorgant (born 1981), French footballer
- Yann Lachuer (born 1972), French footballer
- Yann Lesgourgues (born 1991), French rugby union player
- Yann Lienard (born 2003), French footballer
- Yann M'Vila (born 1990), French footballer
- Yann Marti (born 1998), Swiss tennis player
- Yann Rolim (born 1995), Brazilian footballer
- Yann Sauvé (born 1990), Canadian ice hockey player
- Yann Sommer (born 1988), Swiss footballer
- Yann Songo'o (born 1991), Cameroonian footballer

== In other fields ==
- Yann Arthus-Bertrand (born 1946), French photographer
- Yann LeCun (born 1960), French-American computer scientist
- Yann Weymouth (born 1941), American architect and designer

== See also ==
- Idle Days on the Yann, a short story by Lord Dunsany
- Tri Yann, a French band
- Jan (name)
