= Jan Boháček =

Czech ice hockey defenceman

- Born: February 25, 1969 (age 57) Tábor, Czechoslovakia
- Height: 6 ft 1 in (185 cm)
- Weight: 209 lb (95 kg; 14 st 13 lb)
- Position: Defence
- Shot: Left
- Played for: HC Sparta Praha; HC Pardubice; HC Dukla Jihlava; HC Olomouc; HC České Budějovice; Drakkars de Caen; HC Kladno; HC Havířov; HC Pustertal Wölfe; TH Unia Oświęcim; Dauphins d'Épinal
- National team: Czech Republic
- Playing career: 1989–2016

Jan Boháček (born February 25, 1969) is a Czech former professional ice hockey defenceman. He is currently head coach of HC Řisuty of the 2nd Czech Republic Hockey League.

Boháček played in the Czechoslovak First Ice Hockey League and the Czech Extraliga for HC Sparta Praha, HC Pardubice, HC Dukla Jihlava, HC Olomouc, HC České Budějovice, HC Kladno and HC Havířov. He also played in France for Drakkars de Caen and Dauphins d'Épinal, in Italy for HC Pustertal Wölfe and in Poland for TH Unia Oświęcim.

Boháček became head coach of HC Řisuty on June 15, 2020.
