= Bernt Schneiders =

Dutch politician (born 1959)

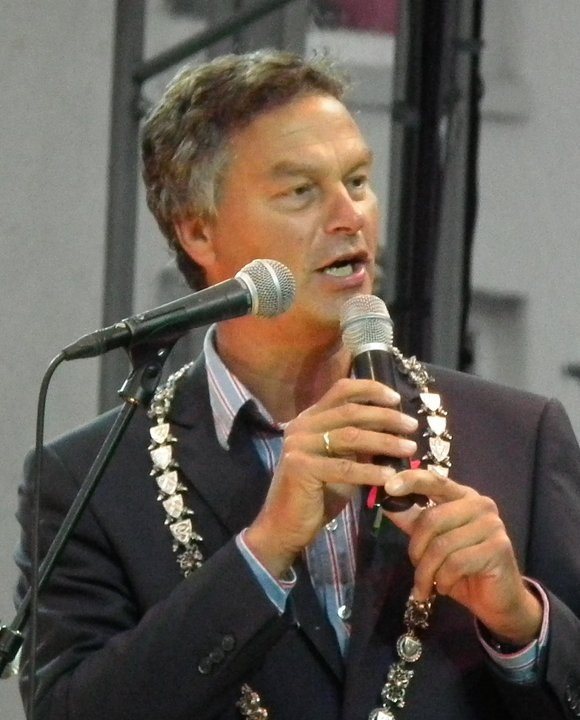
- Bernard Bram (Bernt) Schneiders during the opening of 2010 Haarlam Jazz Stad

Mayor of Haarlem
- In office 4 July 2006 – 2 September 2016

Mayor of Heemskerk
- In office 2001–2006

Mayor of Landsmeer
- In office 1995–2001

Personal details
- Born: Bernard Bram Schneiders; 2 April 1959 (age 66) Breukelen, Netherlands
- Party: Labour Party

Bernt Schneiders (born as Bernard Bram Schneiders 2 April 1959 in Breukelen) is a Dutch politician who is a member of the Partij van de Arbeid (PvdA). From July 2006 until September 2016, he was mayor of Haarlem.

== Career ==
Schneiders studied law and worked after he finished his studies for the Queen's Commissioner in the province of North Holland. He became the mayor of Landsmeer in 1995 and served for six years until 2001.

After he finished his term as mayor of Landsmeer, he became the mayor of the town Heemskerk, which he served for five years.

On 4 July 2006, Schneiders was appointed the mayor of Haarlem, the capital city of North Holland. He took over the mayoral duties from Jaap Pop. He was succeeded by Jos Wienen in September 2016.

== See also ==
- Burgemeester
- Haarlem
