= Jan Streeck =

German politician (born 1997)

Member of the Berlin House of Representatives
- Incumbent
- Assumed office 29 October 2026

Personal details
- Born: 1997 (age 28–29)
- Party: Alternative for Germany

Jan-Philip Streeck (born 1997) is a German politician who was elected member of the Berlin House of Representatives in 2026. He has served as co-chairman of the Alternative for Germany in Pankow since 2024.
