= Ahmad Jan (Bagram detainee) =

Ahmad Jan -- احمد جان آخوند زاده
- Born: 1948 (age 77–78); Oruzgan Province
- Arrested: 2007-09-09; Ghazni Province; CJTF-82
- Detained at: Bagram
- ISN: 3314

On January 15, 2010, the Department of Defense complied with a court order and published a list of Detainees held in the Bagram Theater Internment Facility that included the name Maulawi Ahmad Jan.

According to historian Andy Worthington, author of The Guantanamo Files, he was alleged to be the Taliban district commander, of multiple districts of Ghazni Province, and to have directed improvised explosive device attacks and ambushes.
