= Jan Veentjer =

Dutch field hockey player (1938–2020)

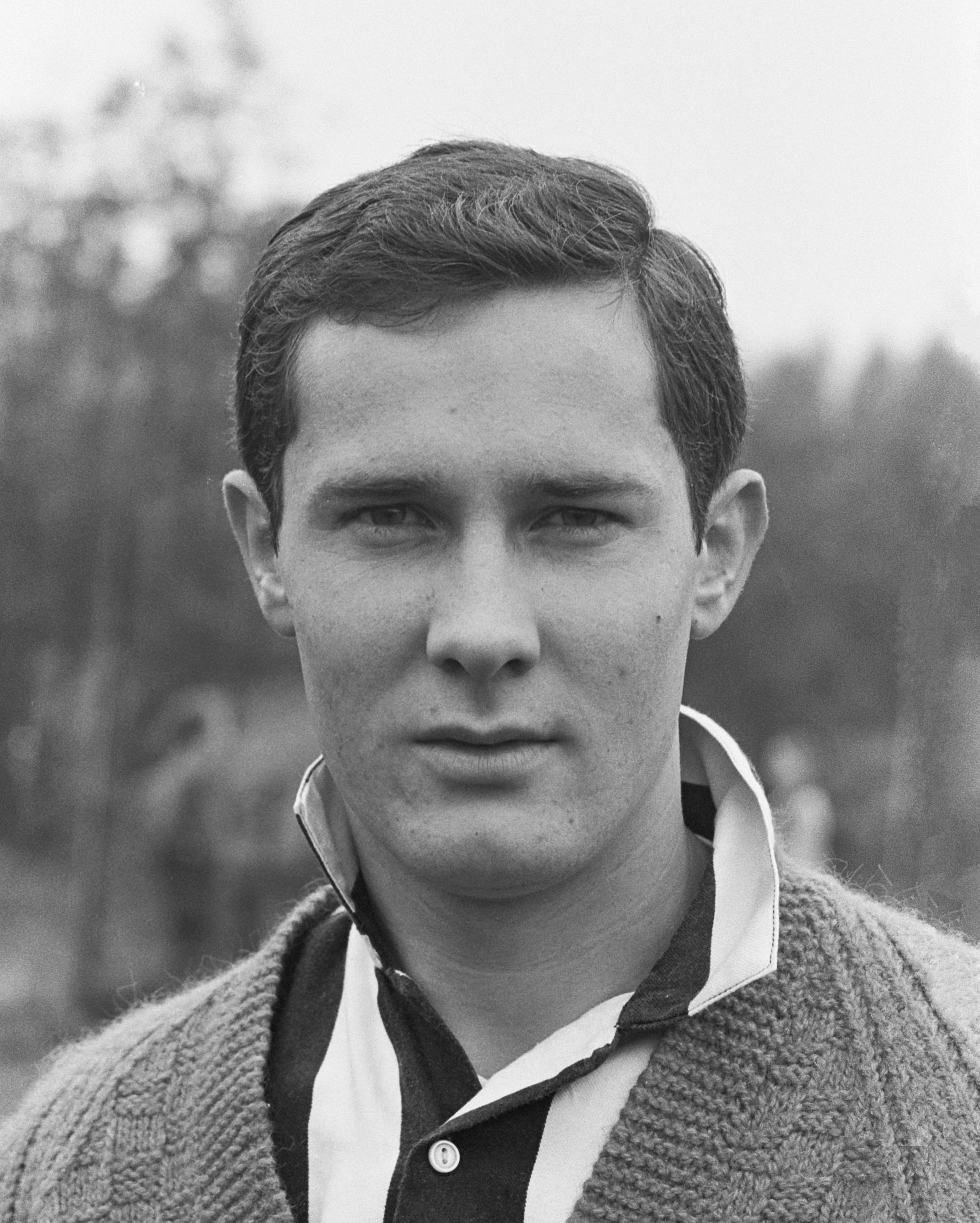
- Jan Veentjer (1963)

Personal information
- Born: 13 February 1938 Rotterdam, the Netherlands
- Died: 2 April 2020 (aged 82)
- Height: 1.80 m (5 ft 11 in)
- Weight: 75 kg (165 lb)

Sport
- Sport: Field hockey
- Club: HDM, Den Haag

Jan Veentjer (13 February 1938 – 2 April 2020) was a field hockey goalkeeper from the Netherlands. He competed at the 1964 Summer Olympics, where his team finished in seventh place.

He died in 2020 at the age of 82 from the consequences of an infection with COVID-19.
