= Ján =

Ján is a Slovak form of the name John.

== Notable people named Ján ==
- Ján Bahýľ (1856–1916), inventor
- Ján Cuper (1946–2025), Slovak politician
- Ján Čapkovič (born 1948), football player
- Ján Čarnogurský (born 1944), Slovak politician
- Ján Cikker (1911–1989), composer
- Ján Ďurica (born 1981), football player
- Ján Fabo (born 1963), sport shooter
- Ján Figeľ (born 1960), politician
- Ján Golian (1906–1945), soldier, military leader of Slovak National Uprising
- Ján Havlík(1928–1965), Roman Catholic martyr
- Ján Hollý (1785–1849), poet and translator
- Ján Kadár (1918–1979), film director
- Ján Kerekréti (1943–2026), Slovak politician
- Ján Kocian (born 1958), football player
- Ján Kollár (1795–1852), writer
- Ján Kožiak (born 1978), football player
- Ján Kubiš (born 1952), Slovak politician
- Ján Kuboš (born 1966), Slovak Roman Catholic bishop
- Ján Lajčiak (1875–1918), Lutheran priest and author
- Ján Lašák (born 1979), ice-hockey goalkeeper
- Ján Lunter (born 1951), Slovak politician
- Ján Ľupták (1946–2025), Slovak politician
- Ján Michalko (1947–2024), Slovak cross-country skier.
- Ján Mucha (born 1982), Slovak footballer
- Ján Packa (born 1952), Slovak handball player
- Ján Polgár (1929-2023), Slovak football player
- Ján Slota (born 1953), Slovak politician
- Ján Šťastný (born 1982), Slovak hockey player
- Ján Svorada (born 1968), Slovak cyclist
- Ján Zvara (born 1963), Slovak high jumper

== Other ==
- Liptovský Ján, village and municipality in Slovakia

== See also ==
- Jan (disambiguation)
