= Jan Šťastný (canoeist) =

Czech canoeist

Personal information
- Nationality: Czech
- Born: 2 June 1970 (age 56) Czech Republic

Sport
- Sport: Canoeing
- Event: Wildwater canoeing
Medal record
Event	1st	2nd	3rd
World Championships	0	3	5

Jan Šťastný (born 2 June 1970) is a Czech male canoeist who won eight medals at individual senior level at the Wildwater Canoeing World Championships.
