= Jan Šťastný =

Czech composer and cellist

Jan Šťastný (c. 1764 – c. 1830) (also Stiasny, Stiastny) was a Czech composer and cellist. He is considered one of the founders of Czech national violoncello school.

Information on Šťastný's life is rather sketchy. He was born around 1764 in Prague, was taught music by his father, and played in a Prague theatre orchestra by 16 years. In 1810, Šťastný was court cellist in Frankfurt (c. 1810–1814). He then worked in Mannheim, and was music director in Nuremberg around 1820. Apparently at some point he lived and worked in England, where in London he met Czech singer and composer Josef Theodor Krov, who called Šťastný, the "Beethoven of the violoncello". Traces of Šťastný disappear after 1826.

Šťastný's cello and basso continuo composition is regarded, in the opinion of violinist, conductor, and cello music historian Wilhelm Joseph von Wasielewski, as one of the best examples of antique cello compositions. He composed cello pieces (11 opus numbers), duets, variations, sonatas, divertimento, instructive pieces, concertino, Grand Trio.
