= Johan (given name) =

- Pronunciation: Dutch: [ˈjoːɦɑn] Norwegian: [jʊˈhɑnː] Swedish: [ˈjûːan] Malay: [ˈdʒohan]
- Gender: Male

Origin
- Meaning: Yahweh is gracious
- Region of origin: Scandinavia, Netherlands, and Flanders

Other names
- Related names: Hans, John, Johannes, Jon, Juhan, Yohan, Yohanan

Johan is a Scandinavian and Dutch form of Iōhannēs / Jōhannēs, the Latin form of the Greek name Iōánnēs (Ἰωάννης), from the Hebrew name Yochanan (יוֹחָנָן), itself derived from the extended form Yehochanan (יְהוֹחָנָן), meaning "Yahweh is gracious". It is uncommon as a surname. Its English equivalent is John.

Johan is also a male given name of Malay language origin, meaning "champion".

Yo-han is a Korean given name, derived from Johan.

== People ==
- Johan III (1537–1592), King of Sweden
- Johan (Archbishop of Uppsala), late 13th-century Polish-born cleric
- Johan Alho (1907–1982), Finnish footballer and a football referee
- Johan Andersson (born 1974), Swedish video game designer
- Johan Beck-Friis (1890–1969), Swedish diplomat
- Johan Berisha (born 1979), Swiss footballer
- Johan Bleeker (born 1942), Dutch space scientist
- Johan Bouma (born 1940), Dutch soil scientist
- Johan Brattberg (born 1996), Swedish footballer
- Johan Brunell (born 1991), Finnish footballer
- Johan Bruyneel (born 1964), Belgian cyclist and team manager
- Johan Büser (born 1983), Swedish politician
- Johan Christian Fabricius (1745–1808), Danish zoologist
- Johan Camargo (born 1993), Panamanian major league baseball infielder
- Johan Cruyff (1947–2016) Dutch football manager and retired player
- Ole-Johan Dahl (1931–2002), Norwegian computer scientist
- Johan Dahlin (born 1986), Swedish footballer
- Johan Derksen (born 1949), Dutch sports journalist and former football player
- Johan Edlund (born 1971), Swedish musician, leader and vocalist of the band Tiamat
- Johan Falkmar (born 1991), Swedish footballer
- Johan Frandsen (born 1982), frontman for Swedish band, The Knockouts
- Johan Frostegård (born 1959), Swedish writer and scientist
- Johan Galtung (1930–2024), Norwegian sociologist
- Johan Geibert (born 1977), Swedish bandy player
- Johan Harmenberg (born 1954), Swedish Olympic champion épée fencer
- Johan Hansing (1888–1941), Estonian lawyer, stage actor, playwright, and politician
- Johan Håstad (born 1960), Swedish mathematician
- Johan Hegg, Vocalist for the melodic death metal band, Amon Amarth
- Johan Gustaf Hellsten (1870–1956), Finnish president
- Johan Hjort (1869–1948), Norwegian fisheries biologist, marine zoologist, and oceanographer
- Johan Hultin (1924–2022) American pathologist
- Johan Kenkhuis (born 1980), Dutch swimmer
- Johan Kim (born 1973), Korean-American singer and record producer
- Johan Kõpp (1874–1970), Estonian Lutheran bishop
- Johan Kristoffersson (born 1988), Swedish race-car driver
- Johan Kury (born 2001), Rwandan footballer
- Johan Lilliehöök (1598-1642), Swedish general and nobleman
- Johan Lundgren (businessman) (born 1966), Swedish businessman
- Johan Augustin Mannerheim (1706–1778), Swedish artillery colonel and commandant
- Johan Micoud (born 1973), French footballer
- Johan van Minnen (1932–2016), Dutch journalist and politician
- Johan Munters (born 1978), Swedish ski jumper
- Johan Museeuw (born 1965), Belgian cyclist
- Johan Neeskens (1951–2024), Dutch soccer player
- Johan Norberg (born 1973), Swedish writer
- Johan Norlén (born 1971), Swedish Navy officer
- Johan Pekkari (born 1971), Swedish Army officer
- Johan Carl Christian Petersen (1813–1880), Danish seaman and interpreter
- Johan Pitka (1872–1944), Estonian military commander
- Johan of Plön (1297–1359), lord of Denmark east of the Great Belt
- Johan Raid (1885–1964), Estonian politician and civil servant
- Johan Reinholdz (born 1980), Swedish guitar player in Andromeda, NonExist and Skyfire
- Johan Renck (born 1966), Swedish director
- Johan Rockström (born 1965), Swedish scientist
- Johan Rojas (born 2000), Dominican baseball player for the Philadelphia Phillies
- Johan Ludvig Runeberg (1804–1877), Fenno-Swede poet
- Johan Santana (born 1979), American baseball player
- Johan Oscar Smith (1871–1943), Norwegian Christian leader, founder of Brunstad Christian Church
- Johan Staël von Holstein (born 1963), Swedish entrepreneur
- Johan Gabriel Ståhlberg (1832–1873), Finnish priest, the father of President K. J. Ståhlberg
- Johan Svensson (born 1962), Swedish Air Force officer
- Johan Teterissa (1961–2019), Indonesian activist
- Johan Theron (born c. 1943), South African information officer
- Johan Theron (tennis) (born 1975), Namibian tennis player
- Johan Thyrén (1861–1933), Swedish academic and politician
- Johan Tarčulovski (born 1974), Macedonian convicted war criminal and politician
- Johan van der Velde (born 1956), Dutch cyclist
- Johan Vonlanthen (born 1986), Swiss football player
- Johan Wallberg (born 1977), Swedish freestyle swimmer
- Johan Josef "John" Willis (born 1952), American-Israeli basketball player
- Johan Zinin (born 1974), Bruneian footballer
- Johan Zulch de Villiers (1845–1910), South African politician

== Fictional characters ==
- Johan, fictional character in a comics series by Peyo
- Johan Liebert, a character from Monster (manga)
- Johan Seong, a character from Lookism (manhwa)
- Johann Brose, a character from Tears of Themis

== See also ==
- Alternate forms for the name John
- Johann – German masculine given name
- Johannes
- John (given name) – Given name
