= Johannes =

- Pronunciation: Afrikaans: [joˈɦanəs] German: [joˈhanəs] Dutch: [joːˈɦɑnəs] Amharic: [johänɨs] Finnish: [ˈjohɑnːes]
- Gender: Male

Origin
- Origin: Hebrew, via Greek and Latin
- Meaning: "YHWH has been gracious"

Other names
- Related names: John, Jan, Yann, Ian, Evan, Juan, Johan, Juha, Juho, Juhani, Hannu, Jean, Ioannis, Giovanni, Hovhannes, Yohan, Hanno, Zhaqiya, Yakiya, Yakh'ya

Johannes is a Medieval Latin form of the personal name that usually appears as "John" in English language contexts. It is a variant of the Greek and Classical Latin variants (Ιωάννης, Ioannes), itself derived from the Hebrew name Yehochanan, meaning "YHWH is gracious". The name became popular in Northern Europe, especially in Germany because of Christianity. Common German variants for Johannes are Johann, Hannes, Hanns, Hans (diminutized to Hänschen or Hänsel, as known from "Hansel and Gretel", a fairy tale by the Grimm brothers), Jens (from Danish) and Jan (from Dutch, and found in many countries). In the Netherlands, Johannes was without interruption the most common masculine birth name until 1989. Johannes is also a popular name in South Africa, particularly among Afrikaners, due to Dutch colonial influences in the region. The English equivalent for Johannes is John.

== In other languages ==
- Chuan − Aragonese
- Eóin − Irish, Scottish Gaelic
- Giovanni − Italian
- Gjon, Gjin − Albanian
- Hannes, Hans, Ioan, Iohannis, Jan, Janne, Jens, Jon, Jonas, Yohannes − various
- Hovhannes − Armenian
- Ieuan, Ifan, Ianto, anglicized as "Evan" − Welsh
- Ivan − Slavic
- Jaan, Jaanus, Juhan, Juku, Juss − Estonian
- Jani − Finnish, Hungarian
- Jānis − Latvian
- János − Hungarian
- Jean − French
- Joan − Catalan, Valencian, Occitan
- Jóannes − Faroese
- João − Portuguese
- John − English
- Juan − Spanish, Manx Gaelic
- Juhani, Juha, Jukka, Hannu, Jussi, Jonne, Joni − Finnish
- Juho − Estonian, Finnish
- Xoán − Galician
- Yahya − Arabic, Turkish
- Zhaqiya (Жақия) − Kazakh

== People with the given name ==
=== Johannes or Jóhannes ===
- Johannes Aavik (1880–1973), Estonian philologist and Fennophile
- Johannes Aigner (alpine skier) (born 2005), Austrian para alpine skier
- Jóhannes Ásbjörnsson (born 1979), Icelandic radio and TV show host
- Jóhannes Atlason (born 1944), Icelandic footballer and football manager
- Johannes Barsch (born 1994), German politician
- Johannes Behner (born 1989), German politician
- Johannes Belsheim (1829–1909), Norwegian priest, translator, and biographer
- Johannes Bitter (born 1982), German handball goalkeeper
- Johannes Bjelke-Petersen, former Premier of Queensland
- Johannes Brahms (1833–1897), German romantic composer
- Johannes van den Brink (1915–2006), Dutch politician and banker
- Johannes Brost (1946–2018), Swedish actor
- Johannes Brun (disambiguation), several people
- Johannes Brüns (1903–1965), German politician (CDU)
- Joannes Corvus (fl. 1512–1544), Flemish painter
- Johannes Edfelt (1904–1997), Swedish writer
- Jóhannes Eðvaldsson (1950–2021), Icelandic footballer
- Johannes Ewald (1743–1781), Danish national dramatist, psalm writer and poet
- Jóhannes Geir Jónsson (1927–2003), Icelandic painter
- Johannes Geis (born 1993), German footballer
- Johannes Groth (born 1988), Greenlandic handball player and coach
- Jóhannes Gunnarsson (1897–1972), Icelandic prelate of the Roman Catholic Church
- Johannes Gutenberg (1400–1468), German printer
- Jóhannes Harðarson (born 1976), Icelandic footballer and coach
- Johannes Hassebroek (1910–1977), German Nazi SS concentration camp commandant
- Johannes Heesters (1903–2011), Dutch actor, singer and entertainer
- Jóhannes Helgason (born 1958), Icelandic guitarist
- Johannes Helms (1828–1895), Danish writer and schoolmaster
- Johannes V. Jensen, Danish writer and Nobel Prize winner
- Johannes of Jerusalem (1042–1119), abbot of the monastery at Vézelay, France
- Jóhannes Haukur Jóhannesson (born 1980), Icelandic actor
- Jóhannes Jónsson (1940–2013), Icelandic businessman
- Johannes Käbin (1905–1999), Soviet Estonian politician
- Johannes Karhapää (1884–1918), Finnish missionary and a saint of the Eastern Orthodox Church
- Johannes Kass (born 1949), Estonian politician
- Johannes Kepler (1571–1630), German astronomer
- Johannes Kerkorrel, South African singer and musician
- Johannes Kjærbøl (1885–1973), Danish politician
- Jóhannes Sveinsson Kjarval (1885–1972), Icelandic painter
- Johannes Kolleck (born 1993), German politician
- Johannes Kölling (born 1984), German politician
- Johannes Kotschy, Swedish singer and songwriter
- Johannes Kotkas (1915–1998), Estonian wrestler
- Jóhannes úr Kötlum (1899–1972), Icelandic writer and poet
- Johannes Latuharhary (1900–1959), Indonesian politician
- Johannes Leak (born 1980), Australian cartoonist and painter
- Johannes Lecküchner (c. 1430s – 1482), German fencer
- Johannes Leimena (1905–1977), founder of the Indonesian Christian Party
- Johannes Liebmann (born 2007), German swimmer
- Johannes Linnankoski (1869–1913), Finnish author
- Johannes Linstead, Canadian guitarist and composer
- Jóhannes Loftsson (born 1973), Icelandic politician
- Johannes Lötter, a Boer commandant in the Boer War
- Johannes Lucius, Dalmatian historian
- Johannes Ludovicus Paquay (1828–1905), Friar Minor known as Valentinus
- Johannes Moesgaard (born 1984), Norwegian football manager
- Johannes Chrysostomus Wolfgangus Theophilus Mozart, Classical era composer
- Johannes Niks (1912–1997), Estonian footballer
- Johannes Orasmaa (1890–1943), Estonian Army General
- Johannes Pääsuke (1892–1918), Estonian photographer and filmmaker
- Johannes Pietsch (born 2001), Austrian singer
- Johannes Radebe, South African dancer
- Johannes Rau (1931–2006), German politician
- Johannes Richter (born 1993), German basketball player
- Johannes Rojola (born 1982),Finnish game developer
- Johannes Rudbeckius (1581–1646), Swedish bishop
- Johannes Semper (1892–1970), Estonian writer and translator
- Johannes Siir (1889–1941), Estonian military colonel and sport shooter
- Johannes Sikkar (1897–1960), Estonian politician
- Johannes Soodla (1897–1965), Estonian military officer
- Johannes Toom (1896–1972), Estonian weightlifter
- Johannes Warneck (1867–1944), an Indonesian-born German pastor, missionary, and the 2nd Ephorus of Batak Christian Protestant Church
- Johannes Undusk (1918–1979), Estonian Communist politician
- Johannes van Damme, Dutch engineer, businessman and murderer
- Johannes Vares (1890–1946), Estonian poet, doctor, and politician
- Johannes Vermeer, Dutch painter
- Johannes Vetter, German athlete
- Johannes Vilberg (1903–1981), Estonian sport shooter
- Johannes Virolainen, former Prime Minister of Finland
- Johannes Voigtmann (born 1992), German basketball player
- Johannes "Honus" Wagner (1874–1955), American baseball player
- Johannes Wildner (born 1956), Austrian violinist and conductor
- Johannes Winkler (1897–1947), German rocket pioneer
- Johannes Winkler (composer), film score composer based in Vienna
- Johannes Wohlwend, Liechtenstein judoka and sports official
- Yohannes IV, Ethiopian 19th-century emperor

=== Joanes ===
- Joanes Leizarraga (1506–1601), Basque priest
- Joanes Rail (born 1958), Canadian Olympic handball player
- Joanes Urkixo (born 1955), Basque language writer

=== Johanes ===
- Johanes Anabo (born 1939), American football player
- Johanes Maliza (born 1981), American soccer player

== Pseudonyms ==
- Johannes Climacus, pseudonym of Søren Kierkegaard in Philosophical Fragments and Concluding Unscientific Postscript
- Johannes de Silentio, pseudonym of Søren Kierkegaard in Fear and Trembling

== Fictional characters ==
- Johannes Cabal, the main character of a series of supernatural fiction novels and short stories by Jonathan L. Howard. Novels include: Johannes Cabal the Necromancer (2009), Johannes Cabal the Detective (2010), Johannes Cabal: The Fear Institute (2011). Short stories: "Johannes Cabal and the Blustery Day" (2004), "Exeunt Demon King" (2006), "The Ereshklig Working" (2010), and "The House of Gears" (2011).
- Johannes (The Traitor), the main antagonist in the video game Rogue Legacy
- Johannes "Jojo" Betzler, the title character of 2019 film Jojo Rabbit
- Johannes Krauser II, the alter ego of the main character in the anime/manga Detroit Metal City

== People with the surname ==
- Alain Johannes, American multi-instrumentalist
- Klaus Iohannis, Romanian president of German origin
- Michelle D. Johannes, American volleyball player and physicist
- Marine Johannès, French basketball player

== Variants ==
- Iohannes (consul 467), Roman consul in 467
- Joannes, Roman emperor in 423–425
- Schinderhannes, German outlaw
- Yuhana
