= Janno =

- Gender: Male
- Language: Estonian
- Name day: 24 June (Estonia)

Origin
- Region of origin: Estonia

Other names
- Related names: Johannes; Juhan; Jaan; Jaanus; Jan; Ants; Johan; Juho; Hannes; Jukk; Juss

Janno is both a masculine given name and a surname predominantly found in Estonia. As a given name it can be a diminutive of Johannes, Juhan, Jan, Jaan, and Jaanus. People bearing the name Janno include:

- Janno Gibbs (born 1969), Filipino singer-songwriter, actor, and comedian
- Janno Jürgens (born 1985), Estonian film director
- Janno Jürisson (born 1980), Estonian footballer
- Janno Kivisild (born 1977), Estonian football coach
- Janno Põldma (born 1950), Estonian film director and children's writer
- Janno Prants (born 1973), Estonian biathlete
- Janno Reiljan (1951–2018), Estonian politician, economist and professor of foreign economics
