= Juss (given name) =

Male given name

- Gender: Male
- Name day: 24 June

Origin
- Region of origin: Estonia

Other names
- Related names: Juhan, Johannes, Ants, Hannes, Hans, Jaan, Jan, Janno, Johan, Juho, Jukk

Juss is an Estonian male given name, often a diminutive of Juhan and Johannes and a cognate of the Finnish language name Jussi.

As of 1 January 2022, 124 men in Estonia bear the name Juss, making it the 593rd most popular male name in the country. The average age of individuals bearing the name is 23-years-old, with the median age being 20. The oldest individuals bearing the name Juss are in the 80-84 age range.

The name Juss is most popular among the age group of 5 to 9 years, with a prevalence of 2.23 per 10,000 inhabitants.

Individuals bearing the name Juss include:

- Juss Haasma (born 1985), actor
- Juss Laansoo (born 1983), motorcycle racer
- Juss Piho (born 1963), painter
- Juss Tamm (born 1977), singer and musician (:et)
