= Charlottenburg-Wilmersdorf 4 =

State electoral district of Germany

- Electoral district for the Berlin House of Representatives
- Charlottenburg-Wilmersdorf 4 in 2026
- District: Charlottenburg-Wilmersdorf
- Electorate: 32,381 (2026)

Current electoral district
- Party: CDU
- Member: Aldona Niemczyk

Charlottenburg-Wilmersdorf 4 is an electoral constituency (German: Wahlkreis) represented in the House of Representatives of Berlin. It elects one member via first-past-the-post voting.

== Geography ==
The constituency comprises the areas on both sides of Bismarckstraße, Kantstraße, and Kurfürstendamm within the borough of Charlottenburg-Wilmersdorf.

There were 32,381 eligible voters in 2026.

== Members ==
Election	Member	Party	%
1995	Axel Rabbach	CDU	40.3
1999	Axel Rabbach	CDU	43.1
2001	Frank Jahnke	SPD	40.3
2006	Frank Jahnke	SPD	37.0
2011	Frank Jahnke	SPD	34.6
2016	Frank Jahnke	SPD	28.6
2021	Christoph Wapler	Green	27.0
2023	Aldona Niemczyk	CDU	28.7
2026	Aldona Niemczyk	CDU	24.5

== Election results ==
=== 2026 election ===
State election (2026): Charlottenburg-Wilmersdorf 4
Notes:	Blue background denotes the winner of the electorate vote. Pink background denotes a candidate elected from their party list. Yellow background denotes an electorate win by a list member, or other incumbent. A ✓ or ✗ denotes status of any incumbent, win or lose respectively.						
Party	Candidate	Votes	%	±%	Party votes	%	±%
CDU	✓ Aldona Niemczyk	5,894	24.5	▼4.1	5,962	24.6	▼3.3
Greens	Christoph Wapler	5,803	24.1	▼1.9	4,748	19.6	▼4.6
Left	Felix Städler	4,272	17.8	▲11.0	5,006	20.7	▲12.5
SPD	Timur Sarić	3,504	14.6	▼7.8	3,410	14.1	▼6.0
AfD	Thomas Marten	1,958	8.1	▲3.5	2,023	8.4	▲3.6
FDP	Felix Recke-Friedrich	1,033	4.3	▼3.0	1,062	4.4	▼3.6
BSW	Thuy Dung Nguyen	646	2.7		783	3.2	
Volt	Christian Weißsteiner	612	2.5		693	2.9	▲1.4
Tierschutzpartei	Martin Tank	340	1.4	▼0.5	286	1.2	▼0.3
PARTEI					114	0.5	▼0.5
PdF					44	0.2	
ÖDP					33	0.1	Steady
DKP					14	0.1	Steady
du.					12	0.0	▼0.1
SGP					4	0.0	Steady
Informal votes		303			171		
Total valid votes		24,062			24,194		
Turnout		24,365	75.2	▲10.1			
CDU hold	Majority	91	0.4	▼2.2			

=== 2023 repeat election ===
Changes denoted below for the 2023 election are compared to the 2016 election, as the 2021 election was declared invalid.

State election (2023): Charlottenburg-Wilmersdorf 4
Notes:	Blue background denotes the winner of the electorate vote. Pink background denotes a candidate elected from their party list. Yellow background denotes an electorate win by a list member, or other incumbent. A ✓ or ✗ denotes status of any incumbent, win or lose respectively.						
Party	Candidate	Votes	%	±%	Party votes	%	±%
CDU	Aldona Maria Niemczyk	5,848	28.6	▲8.3	5,709	27.9	▲9.9
Greens	Christoph Wapler	5,321	26.0	▲6.1	4,955	24.2	▲3.6
SPD	Reinhard Naumann	4,570	22.4	▼6.2	4,119	20.1	▼3.1
FDP	Felix-Maximilian Recke-Friedrich	1,489	7.3	▼4.1	1,643	8.0	▼5.6
Left	Johannes Kolleck	1,388	6.8	▼2.3	1,684	8.2	▼1.4
AfD	Thomas Marten	939	4.6	▼4.1	965	4.7	▼4.1
Volt					306	1.5	
Tierschutzpartei	Henriette Spiering	388	1.9		303	1.5	▲0.1
PARTEI	Nicole Langreder	262	1.3		192	0.9	▼0.6
dieBasis	Michael Winderlich	114	0.6		94	0.5	
Team Todenhöfer					84	0.4	
Pirates	Marlene Cieschinger	85	0.4	▼1.5	55	0.3	▼1.0
Klimaliste					46	0.2	
Gray Panthers					40	0.2	▼0.3
Mieterpartei					39	0.2	
The Grays					29	0.1	
Verjüngungsforschung					27	0.1	▼0.1
FW					27	0.1	▼0.1
Humanists					26	0.1	
du.					22	0.1	
ÖDP	Lars Clemens Arnold	38	0.2		19	0.1	
DKP					17	0.1	
Bildet Berlin!					15	0.1	
New Democrats					11	0.1	
Bergpartei, die ÜberPartei					10	0.0	
The Pinks/Alliance 21					9	0.0	
SGP					6	0.0	Steady
BüSo					4	0.0	Steady
NPD					3	0.0	▼0.1
LKR					2	0.0	▼0.3
German Conservative					1	0.0	
Informal votes		139			131		
Total valid votes		20,442			20,462		
Turnout		20,615	65.1	▼3.0			
CDU gain from SPD	Majority	527	2.6				

=== 2021 election (annulled) ===
The election in 2021 was annulled and rerun in 2023.

State election (2021): Charlottenburg-Wilmersdorf 4
Notes:	Blue background denotes the winner of the electorate vote. Pink background denotes a candidate elected from their party list. Yellow background denotes an electorate win by a list member, or other incumbent. A ✓ or ✗ denotes status of any incumbent, win or lose respectively.						
Party	Candidate	Votes	%	±%	Party votes	%	±%
Greens	Christoph Wapler	6,564	27.0	▲7.1	6,153	25.1	▲4.5
SPD	Reinhard Naumann	5,981	24.6	▼4.0	5,385	22.0	▼1.2
CDU	Aldona Maria Niemczyk	4,971	20.4	▲0.1	4,595	18.7	▲0.7
FDP	Felix-Maximilian Recke-Friedrich	2,607	10.7	▼0.7	2,809	11.5	▼2.2
Left	Johannes Kolleck	1,803	7.4	▼1.7	2,192	8.9	▼0.7
AfD	Thomas Marten	978	4.0	▼4.7	991	4.0	▼4.8
Volt					465	1.9	
Tierschutzpartei	Henriette Spiering	458	1.9		322	1.3	▼0.1
PARTEI	Nicole Langreder	425	1.7		368	1.5	▼0.1
dieBasis	Michael Winderlich	354	1.5		290	1.2	
Team Todenhöfer					219	0.9	
FW					156	0.6	
Klimaliste					92	0.4	
Humanists					72	0.3	
Pirates	Marlene Cieschinger	119	0.5	▼1.4	70	0.3	▼1.0
Gray Panthers					54	0.2	▼0.3
APT					47	0.2	
The Grays					42	0.2	
ÖDP	Lars Clemens Arnold	52	0.2		29	0.1	
Verjüngungsforschung					29	0.1	▼0.1
Mieterpartei					22	0.1	
du.					21	0.1	
Bergpartei, die ÜberPartei					20	0.1	
Bildet Berlin!					19	0.1	
DKP					15	0.1	Steady
New Democrats					10	0.0	
LKR					9	0.0	▼0.3
NPD					6	0.0	▼0.1
BüSo					4	0.0	Steady
SGP					3	0.0	Steady
The Pinks/Alliance 21					3	0.0	
German Conservative					0	0.0	
Informal votes		476			193		
Total valid votes		24,312			24,512		
Turnout		24,826	78.4	▲10.3			
Greens gain from SPD	Majority	583	2.4				

== See also ==
- Politics of Berlin
- House of Representatives of Berlin
