= Charlottenburg-Wilmersdorf 7 =

State electoral district of Germany

- Electoral district for the Berlin House of Representatives
- Charlottenburg-Wilmersdorf 7 in 2026
- District: Charlottenburg-Wilmersdorf
- Electorate: 32,533 (2026)

Current electoral district
- Party: CDU
- Member: Felor Badenberg

Charlottenburg-Wilmersdorf 7 is an electoral constituency (German: Wahlkreis) represented in the House of Representatives of Berlin. It elects one member via first-past-the-post voting.

== Geography ==
The constituency comprises the western part of the district of Wilmersdorf, including the areas surrounding Rüdesheimer Platz, Wilmersdorf Cemetery, and Wilmersdorf Ice Stadium, within the borough of Charlottenburg-Wilmersdorf.

There were 32,533 eligible voters in 2026.

== Members ==
Election	Member	Party	%
1999	Jürgen Adler	CDU	52.5
2001	Christian Gaebler	SPD	39.4
2006	Christian Gaebler	SPD	36.8
2011	Michael Garmer	CDU	33.4
2016	Florian Dörstelmann	SPD	27.4
2021	Florian Dörstelmann	SPD	26.2
2023	Stefanie Bung	CDU	34.2
2026	Felor Badenberg	CDU	26.1

== Election results ==
=== 2026 election ===
State election (2026): Charlottenburg-Wilmersdorf 7
Notes:	Blue background denotes the winner of the electorate vote. Pink background denotes a candidate elected from their party list. Yellow background denotes an electorate win by a list member, or other incumbent. A ✓ or ✗ denotes status of any incumbent, win or lose respectively.						
Party	Candidate	Votes	%	±%	Party votes	%	±%
CDU	Felor Badenberg	6,581	26.1	▼8.1	6,631	26.1	▼5.8
Greens	Isabel Blecher	5,617	22.3	▲1.2	4,567	18.0	▼2.1
SPD	Florian Dörstelmann	4,485	17.8	▼6.1	4,017	15.8	▼6.3
Left	Johannes Kolleck	3,777	15.0	▲9.1	4,645	18.3	▲11.0
AfD	Andreas Quint	2,509	9.9	▲4.7	2,577	10.1	▲4.6
FDP	Martin Lutzenberger	935	3.7	▼1.3	901	3.5	▼2.8
BSW	Shayan Ahmadi	683	2.7		765	3.0	
Volt	Markus Flaam	641	2.5		677	2.7	▲1.6
Tierschutzpartei					415	1.6	▼0.1
PARTEI					117	0.5	▼0.5
PdF					44	0.2	
ÖDP					37	0.1	Steady
du.					19	0.1	Steady
DKP					13	0.1	Steady
SGP					3	0.0	Steady
Informal votes		440			240		
Total valid votes		25,228			25,428		
Turnout		25,668	78.9	▲8.7			
CDU hold	Majority	964	3.8	▼6.5			

=== 2023 repeat election ===
Changes denoted below for the 2023 election are compared to the 2016 election, as the 2021 election was declared invalid.

State election (2023): Charlottenburg-Wilmersdorf 7
Notes:	Blue background denotes the winner of the electorate vote. Pink background denotes a candidate elected from their party list. Yellow background denotes an electorate win by a list member, or other incumbent. A ✓ or ✗ denotes status of any incumbent, win or lose respectively.						
Party	Candidate	Votes	%	±%	Party votes	%	±%
CDU	Stefanie Bung	7,638	34.2	▲9.2	7,121	31.9	▲10.7
SPD	✗ Florian Dörstelmann	5,325	23.9	▼3.5	4,935	22.1	▼1.1
Greens	Ansgar Gusy	4,701	21.1	▲2.9	4,487	20.1	▲2.0
Left	Christian Sekula	1,310	5.9	▼2.3	1,633	7.3	▼1.9
AfD	Harald Laatsch	1,165	5.2	▼5.0	1,231	5.5	▼4.9
FDP	Björn Matthias Jotzo	1,109	5.0	▼3.6	1,409	6.3	▼4.6
Tierschutzpartei	Dorian Christopher Paul Raßloff	488	2.2		382	1.7	▼0.2
Volt					230	1.0	
PARTEI	Daniel Bohn	308	1.4	▼1.0	255	1.0	▼0.3
dieBasis	Sabrina Kollmorgen	173	0.8		121	0.5	
Gray Panthers					70	0.3	▼0.5
Team Todenhöfer					70	0.3	
FW	Ramona Treder	94	0.4		52	0.2	
Pirates					48	0.2	▼1.1
Verjüngungsforschung					43	0.2	▼0.1
The Grays					39	0.2	
Mieterpartei					36	0.2	
Klimaliste					32	0.1	
ÖDP					28	0.1	
du.					26	0.1	
Humanists					25	0.1	
Bildet Berlin!					18	0.1	
DKP					14	0.1	Steady
NPD					10	0.0	▼0.1
The Pinks/Alliance 21					10	0.0	
New Democrats					9	0.0	
SGP					8	0.0	Steady
Bergpartei, die ÜberPartei					7	0.0	
BüSo					5	0.0	▼0.1
LKR					4	0.0	▼0.4
German Conservative					3	0.0	
Informal votes		163			135		
Total valid votes		22,311			22,331		
Turnout		22,502	70.2	▼3.8			
CDU gain from SPD	Majority	2,313	10.3				

=== 2021 election (annulled) ===
The election in 2021 was annulled and rerun in 2023.

State election (2021): Charlottenburg-Wilmersdorf 7
Notes:	Blue background denotes the winner of the electorate vote. Pink background denotes a candidate elected from their party list. Yellow background denotes an electorate win by a list member, or other incumbent. A ✓ or ✗ denotes status of any incumbent, win or lose respectively.						
Party	Candidate	Votes	%	±%	Party votes	%	±%
SPD	✓ Florian Dörstelmann	6,681	26.2	▼1.2	6,083	23.8	▲0.5
CDU	Stefanie Bung	6,155	24.1	▼1.0	5,630	22.0	▲0.8
Greens	Ansgar Gusy	5,784	22.7	▲4.5	5,586	21.8	▲3.7
FDP	Björn Matthias Jotzo	2,114	8.3	▼0.3	2,370	9.3	▼1.7
Left	Christian Sekula	1,747	6.8	▼1.4	2,112	8.3	▼1.0
AfD	Harald Laatsch	1,225	4.8	▼5.4	1,287	5.0	▼5.4
Tierschutzpartei	Dorian Christopher Paul Raßloff	633	2.5		444	1.7	▼0.1
Volt					374	1.5	
dieBasis	Sabrina Kollmorgen	458	1.8		369	1.4	
PARTEI	Daniel Bohn	420	1.6	▼0.7	327	1.3	Steady
FW	Ramona Treder	290	1.1		226	0.9	
Team Todenhöfer					134	0.5	
Gray Panthers					88	0.3	▼0.5
The Grays					84	0.3	
Pirates					69	0.3	▼1.0
Klimaliste					68	0.3	
APT					61	0.2	
Verjüngungsforschung					45	0.2	▼0.1
Humanists					40	0.2	
du.					33	0.1	
Bildet Berlin!					28	0.1	
ÖDP					27	0.1	
Mieterpartei					27	0.1	
LKR					19	0.1	▼0.3
New Democrats					18	0.1	
DKP					13	0.1	Steady
NPD					9	0.0	▼0.1
Bergpartei, die ÜberPartei					7	0.0	
The Pinks/Alliance 21					7	0.0	
BüSo					6	0.0	▼0.1
SGP					3	0.0	▼0.1
German Conservative					1	0.0	
Informal votes		265			200		
Total valid votes		25,507			25,595		
Turnout		25,825	80.1	▲6.1			
SPD hold	Majority	526	2.1				

== See also ==
- Politics of Berlin
- House of Representatives of Berlin
