= Jussi =

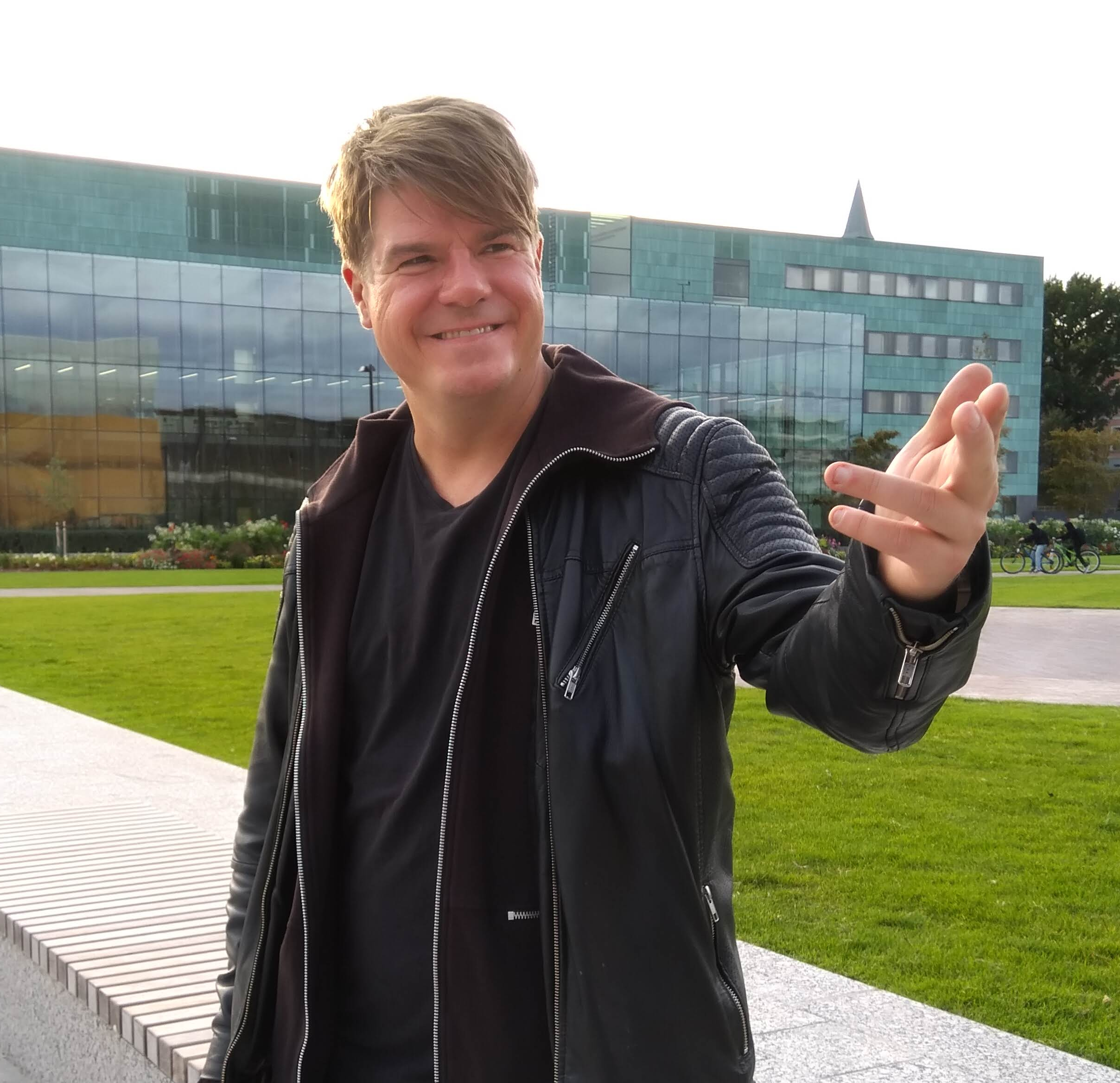
Jussi Heikelä in Helsinki, 17 September, 2019.

Jussi (Finnish pronunciation: [ˈjusːi]) is a male given name. In Finnish originally it is short for Juhani or Juho, Finnish for Johannes/John, but is also recognized as a name in its own right for official purposes. It can also be short for Justus, or a Finnish form of Justin.

== Notable people with the name ==
- Jussi 69 (1972), drummer of The 69 Eyes
- Jussi Adler-Olsen (1950), Danish writer
- Jussi Björling (1911–1960), Swedish tenor
- Jussi Chydenius (1972), Finnish musician
- Jussi Halla-aho (1971) Finnish Slavic linguist, blogger and a politician.
- Jussi Hautamäki (1979), Finnish ski jumper
- Jussi Jokinen (1983), Finnish ice hockey player
- Jussi Jääskeläinen (1975), Finnish football player
- Jussi Järventaus (born 1951), Finnish politician
- Jussi Kurikkala (1912–1951), Finnish cross-country skier
- Jussi Kujala (footballer) (1983), Finnish football player
- Jussi Lampi (1961), Finnish musician
- Jussi Lehtisalo (1972), bassist and founder of the band Circle
- Jussi Markkanen (1975), Finnish ice hockey player
- Jussi Mäkilä (1974), Finnish cyclist
- Jussi Merinen (1873–1918), Finnish politician
- Jussi Pajunen (1954), mayor of Helsinki
- Jussi Raittinen (1943-2024), Finnish musician and songwriter
- Jussi Sydänmaa (1973), guitarist of the band Lordi
- Jussi Timonen (1983), Finnish ice hockey player
- Jussi "Juba" Tuomola (1965), Finnish cartoonist
- Jussi Tupamäki (born 1977), Finnish ice hockey coach
- Jussi Vasara (1987), Finnish football player
- Jussi Veikkanen (1981), Finnish cyclist
- Jussi Wickström (1983), guitarist of Turisas

== See also ==
- Jussi Award, a Finnish annual film award
- Juss (given name), an Estonian variant
- Jüssi, an Estonian surname
