= Yohanna (name) =

Yohanna is both a given name and a surname. Notable people with the name include:

- Yohanna Barnaba Abdallah (died 1924), Mozambican writer
- Yohanna Dickson (1920–2015), Nigerian military official
- Yohanna Idha (born 1978), Swedish actress
- Yohanna Logan (born 1975), American fashion designer
- Yohanna Madaki (1941–2006), Nigerian lawyer
- Buba Yohanna (born 1982), Cameroonian footballer

== See also ==
- Jóhanna Guðrún Jónsdóttir (born 1990), Icelandic singer, known as Yohanna
- Yohannan
