= Yuhanna =

- Gender: Male

Origin
- Origin: Arabic
- Region of origin: Middle East

Other names
- Related names: Yohannan (Syriac), Yuhana (Mandaic), John

Yuhanna or Youhanna (Arabic: يوحنا) is an Arabic masculine name used by Christians. It is derived from the Syriac masculine given name Yohannan (Classical Syriac: ܝܘܚܢܢ; "John").

People named Yuhanna include:

== People ==
- Yuhanna al-Injili or John the Evangelist (fl. 1st century), author attributed to the Gospel of John
- Yuhanna Maroun (628–707), first patriarch of the Maronite Church
- Yuḥannā Al Demashqi or John of Damascus (675–749), Arab Christian monk and saint
- Yuhanna Ibn Masawaiyh (777–857), Christian physician
- Yuhanna ibn Bukhtishu (fl. 9th century), Persian or Syriac physician
- Yuhanna Ibn Sarabiyun or Yahya ibn Sarafyun (fl. 9th century), Christian physician
- Ibrahim ibn Yuhanna (fl. late 10th and early 11th centuries), Byzantine bureaucrat, translator, and author from Antioch
- Yuhanna Ibn Masawaih al-Mardini (died 1015), Christian physician
- Yuhanna al-Asad or Leo Africanus (1494–1554), Andalusi diplomat and author
- Yuhanna Makhluf, Maronite Patriarch from 1608 to 1633
- Yousef Yuhanna Meletios Macarios III Zaim or Macarius III Ibn al-Za'im, Patriarch of Antioch from 1647 to 1672
- Yuhanna al-Armani (1726–1786), Armenian artist
- Yuhanna Habib, 19th-century founder of the Congregation of the Maronite Lebanese Missionaries or Kreimists
- Saliba ibn Yuhanna (fl. 14th century), Syriac Christian author
- Michael Yuhanna or Tariq Aziz (1936–2015), Iraqi politician under Saddam Hussein

== See also ==
- Yuhana
- Yohannan
- Johannes
