= Yuhana =

- Gender: Male

Origin
- Origin: Syriac
- Region of origin: Iraq, Iran

Other names
- Related names: Yohannan (Syriac), Yuhanna (Arabic and Persian), Yohanan (Hebrew), John

Yuhana (Classical Mandaic: ࡉࡅࡄࡀࡍࡀ) is a Mandaic masculine given name for John. It may refer to:

- Yahya Yuhana, the Mandaic name for John the Baptist
- Yahya Yuhana Mandi, a Mandaean temple in New South Wales, Australia

== People ==
- Yuhana Nashmi, Iraqi-Australian artist

== See also ==
- Joehana (1895–1930), Sundanese writer
- Johannes
