= Hassan bin Omari =

Yao chief and caravan raider

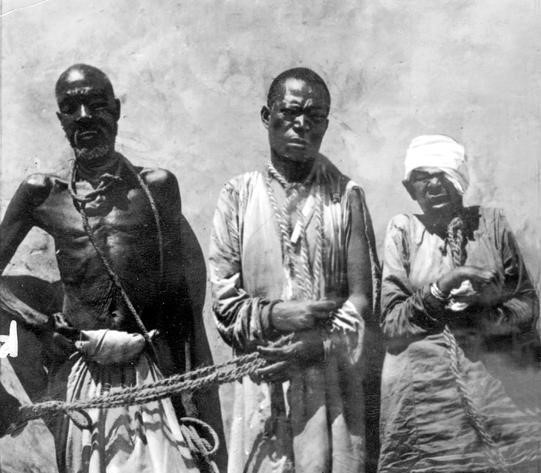
Hassan bin Omari (aka Makunganya), right, Omari Muenda, centre and Jumbe, left

Hassan bin Omari, also known as Makunganya (died on 26 November 1895), one of the Makanjila Yao people, was one of the most influential and successful ivory and slave traders and caravan raiders in present-day south-east Tanzania, and was a chief of the Mavuji. Having attacked the German occupying forces, he was eventually caught and hanged by German troops, along with his associates.

== Background ==
It is necessary to understand his background in order to place him in context of the uprisings against the then German occupation of East Africa, and the British presence in the eastern and more southern areas of the continent of Africa. Most of the historical documents available are only from the occupying powers. Hassan bin Omari's origins stem from the Makanjila Yao people who, by the 19th century, controlled the main trade route from the southern shores of Lake Nyasa (now Lake Malawi) and the Zambezi valley to the southern coast of Tanganyika (now Tanzania), and in particular to Kilwa Kivinje, which had become the principal port for exportation of slaves, and where a large Yao community had been established by the 19th century. Kilwa Kivinje, 25 km north of Kilwa Kisiwani, was the main port in the Kilwa area in 19th century during Omani and German rule of this coast.

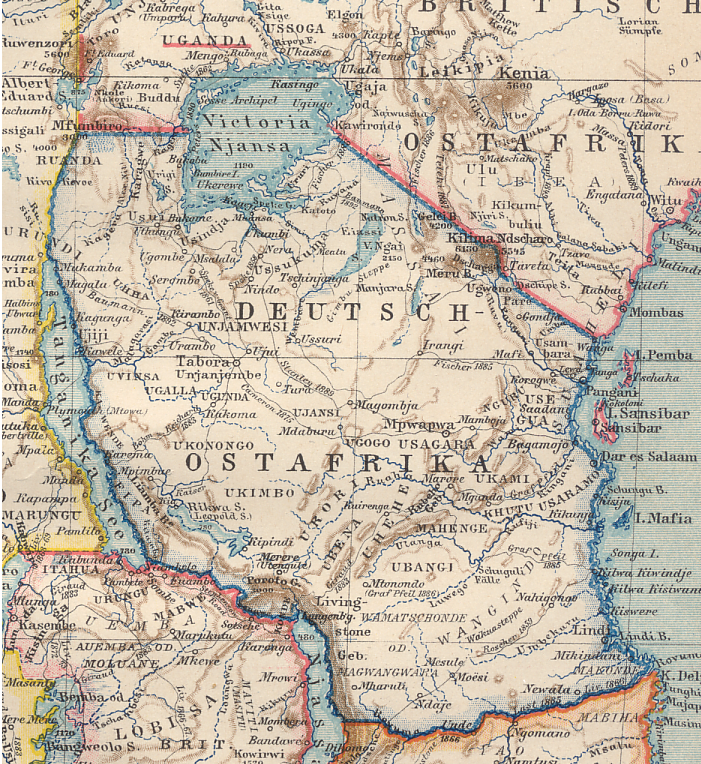
Deutsch Ostafrika

== The Makanjila Yao ==
Many sources confirm Hassan bin Omari's involvement in the uprising of 1888, along with the general involvement of the Yao people. He certainly exerted a significant measure of control over the lucrative caravan route from Makanjila to Kilwa and, in both, Makanjila and Kilwa, large numbers of the Yao in that century had already converted to Islam.

The Yao trade, with the coast of Kilwa in particular, was well-established by the early 17th century. The Yao came annually to Kilwa and the land opposite the Island of Mozambique, bringing ivory, slaves, and other commodities.

The Yao, people from Lake Nyasa, are also mentioned as among the earliest of inland people settling in Kilwa Kivinje, in "The Chronicle of Kilwa Kivinje".

Makanjila III, one of the Mangochi Yao chiefs of the Nyasa area, adopted Islam in 1870 as his personal and court religion. Along with other Yao chiefs, they were deeply involved in the capture of slaves from neighbouring tribes, including the Nyanja. Makanjila's village was observed by James Frederic Elton in September 1877 as the "...town of Makanjila" and he himself as "...the greatest chief and slaver on the east shore of the Nyasa". He went on to describe it as "a well-cultivated country ...at the foot of the hills, the country ... cool and healthy... The town ...an extensive settlement, and houses built with more care than I should have expected to see. The chief boasts a deep verandah and a 'baraza' better than many of the Zanzibar tumble down mansions." Makanjila had become a very rich man and was a committed Muslim, with respect for the Sultan of Zanzibar. As he told Johnson in 1890, "If the Wazungu (white men) came to take the Sultan of Zanzibar's country, I, Makanjira will come to his rescue!"

The Yao involvement in the uprising was inevitable with regard to the threat posed by the German and British occupying forces at both ends of the lucrative trade which had expanded in the second half of the 19th century, and had been responsible for the booming success of Kilwa and the Makanjila Yao. Pari passu with the German landings on the East African coast in 1888, along with the patrolling navies of other European powers, and the real threat of obstruction at the major coastal outlet for their caravans, the Makanjila Yao also faced an increasingly successful campaign against their territory in the Nyasa region by the British forces of Harry Johnston and Captain Cecil Maguire, along with their contingent of Sikh and Zanzibari soldiers, in the late 1880s and early 1890s. In 1891, Captain Maguire died while engaged in battle with Makanjila, but by 1893, Harry Johnston had practically conquered all the Makanjila territory. In his words, "the considerable increase to the forces at my disposal enabled me, in the autumn of 1893, to undertake and carry out the complete conquest of Makanjira. We first drove him from the west shore of the lake, which he had recently seized, and then attacked him in his own country and captured every one of his towns in succession, finally reducing him to sue for terms."

In connection, it is of interest to note that the Makanjila, at this time, was Mwenchande Salimu, the first of the Makanjilas of patrilineal, instead of the previously matrilineal, descent. After his defeat at the hands of Johnston, he fled "to Mwembe to his friend Che Mataka, his fellow-countryman; later he joined Che Makunganya at the coast (where he stayed) till in 1914 he returned." He presumably reached the coast in about 1894, or 1895, and would have been with Makunganya, or Hassan bin Omari, at the time of the succeeding events.

== The Kilwa Kivinje uprising of 1888 ==
Kilwa had been the target of previous unrest in the 19th century. In 1875, for example, the Makwangara had laid siege to the town and demanded tribute.

Following the cession of the coastal rights for customs and trade on the coastline opposite Zanzibar in April 1888 to the German East Africa Company (German:Deutsche OstAfrika Gesellschaft) by the Sultan of Zanzibar, and the assumption of the administration of the leased territory by them in August 1888, the company attempted to take possession of all the important ports, including Kilwa Kivinje, employing the German forces of the company to raise the company's own flag beside or instead of that of the Sultan of Zanzibar. Within days, however, the previously existing tensions turned into violence in several coastal towns, notably in Pangani, Saadani and Bagamoyo. Although labelled as an 'Arab revolt'(German:Araberaufstandes), it is clear that the rebellion included large numbers of native people, predominantly the Yao in the area of Kilwa. By September of that year, in Kilwa Kivinje, after the Sultan's wali was dismissed, people armed themselves and invited the German East Africa Company officials to remove their flag and leave Kilwa. When the officials, Heinrich Hessell and Gustav Krieger refused, they were laid under a siege which continued for a couple of days. One of the Germans, Krieger, was shot dead as he tried to come out of the fort to attract the attention of the German warship anchored off the coast, the Möwe, leading the other, Hessell, to lock himself indoors and shoot himself.

The death of the officials and the scale of the uprising was for the German forces "das Signal ... fur eine Reihenoch nicht beendeter Kampfe" ('a signal for a series of ceaseless battles')

A monument was later erected in Kilwa Kivinje to commemorate the death of the above two German officials. In the light of the above considerations, the account of Gustav Michahelles, the German Consul-General in Zanzibar, to Bismarck, that "the Yao were instigated to attack the Germans by Arab slave-traders around Lake Nyasa", and that it was no local uprising of illwill against the German administration, but had its "Ausgangpunkt sudlich von Rovuma hinter den portugiesichen Provinzien und aus den Gegenden Nyassa-Sees genommen'('took its origin from south of Rovuma behind the Portuguese provinces and from the areas of Lake Nyassa)" does not seem to be without foundation. Euan-Smith also communicated to the Marquess of Salisbury that "the Yao themselves claimed that they were the original owners of the coast which they had returned to repossess".

== After the coastal uprisings of 1888 ==
Not long after, on 2 February 1889, the German Reichstag approved the chancellor's proposals for rescuing the DOAG from the helplessness in which it found itself, and Hermann von Wissmann was named imperial commissioner, appointed to lead an expeditionary force to East Africa to deal with the coastal uprisings. Hermann von Wissmann arrived with his large motley army of mercenaries, 600 Sudanese, 350 Zulu and fifty Somali, in March 1889. Aided by the ships under Admiral Deinhard, he successfully quelled the northern part of the coast, and later turned his attention to Kilwa and the south, landing with 1200 men south of Kilwa, and then marching north, occupied it through the combined use of forces at sea and on land. The bombardment of Kilwa Kivinje began on 3 May, continued through the night and the following day, reducing almost a quarter of the city to ashes. By June 1890, the rebellions had petered out. The rebels meanwhile had fled and sought refuge in the neighbouring Mavuji mountains, where Hassan bin Omari had his stronghold. Von Zelewski was left by Wissmann in charge of a permanent station in Kilwa with two companies of Africans, 15 Europeans and 5 guns. A relative period of peace ensued, undisturbed even when von Zelewski captured and executed the alleged murderers of the German East Africa Company officials, Hessell and Krieger.

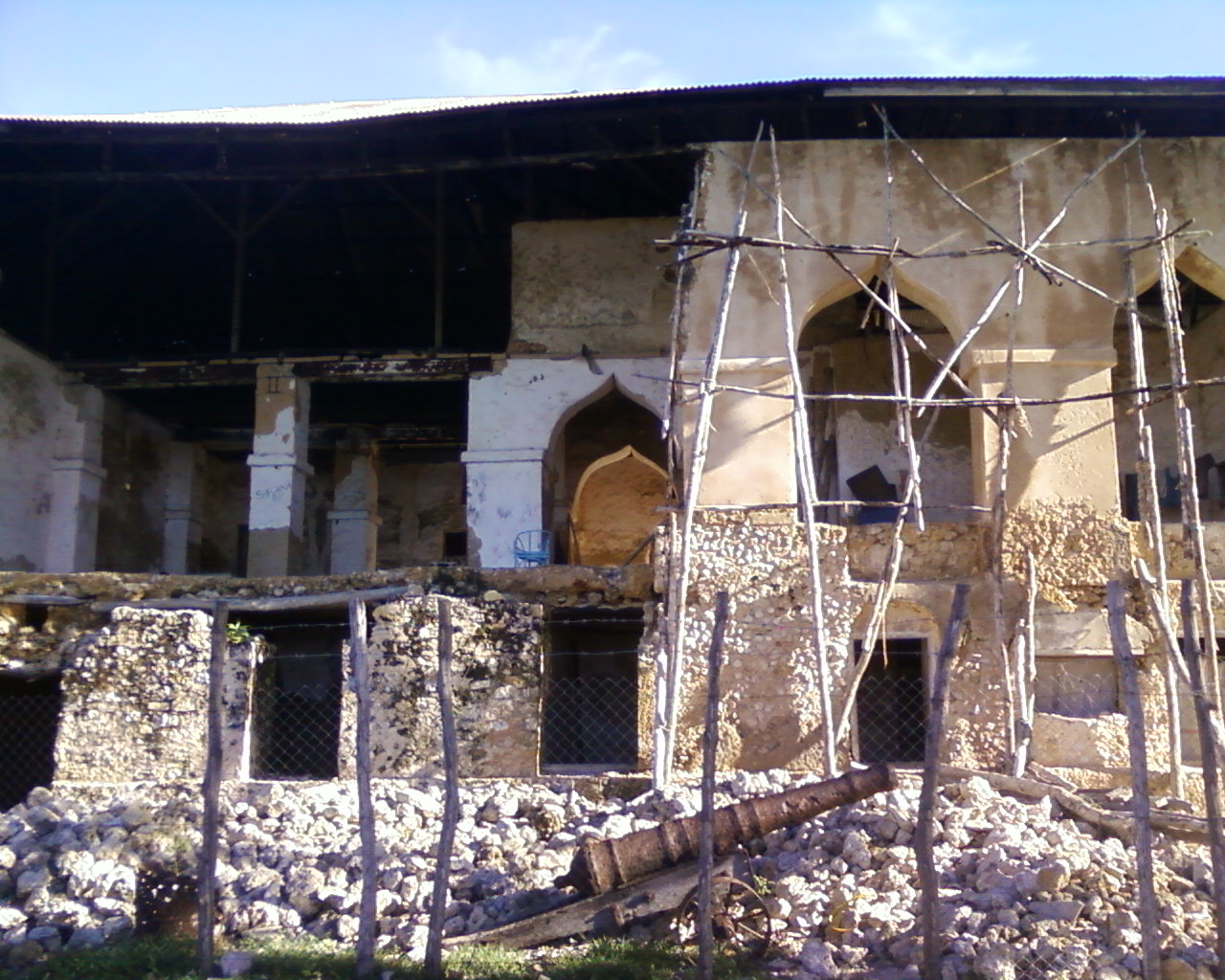
German Boma in Kilwa Kivinje

In June 1894, Lieutenant Fromm, on orders from the Governor, had advanced into the Mavuji mountains, and stormed the boma of Hassan bin Omari, but to no avail as he had managed to escape beforehand. The June 1894 diary entries of the Bavarian sergeant, Josef Weinberger, who took part in the expedition against the 'mafitis'(general word used for any warlike tribe of the 'Zulu' people in German East Africa), detail this attempt. He dwells on this frustrated campaign, and also records, on the evening of 5 June, that the failure had been due to a betrayal by an akida of Kilwa, Abdalla bin Omari, as disclosed by a prisoner spy, who confessed after numerous beatings. (German: "Gefangener Spion gesteht es, nachdem er unzählige aufgezählt bekommen")

== The attack on the German Boma at Kilwa Kivinje in 1894 ==
In early September, the telegraph line between Mohoro and Kilwa was reportedly destroyed by Mavuji people. A few days later, at dawn on 7 September 1894, following numerous rumours, Hassan bin Omari's Mavuji and Yao men in their thousands fired on the Kilwa station, bearing two red flags of the Sultan of Zanzibar. A nearby mosque was implicated from the sounds which emerged from it at the time of 'fajr' prayers. Heavy fire continued on both sides, with cannons fired by the men in the station. Around noon, the vicinity of the station had been cleared, and the Mavujis retreated. On the German side, a European and four coloured soldiers were wounded, the Mavudjis left 37 dead by the walls of the station. The dead and wounded they dragged away with them is unknown. A couple of prisoners were later hanged when Lieutenant Colonel von Trotha visited Kilwa. Reports also circulated that 600 tins of powder, 6 boxes of primers and 10 cases of money from a Zanzibar dhow had landed in Mtapatapa and had been delivered to Hassan bin Omari.

In the "Makunganya Shairi", a fawning paeon in praise of Wissmann composed shortly after the events, but from received accounts, it is alleged that Hassan bin Omari had the plan to capture Wissmann himself, unaware that he had left the town some time beforehand, a story repeated in press reports at the time. The attack was audacious and was to result in a determined hunt for Hassan bin Omari and his men.

== After the attack of the Fort at Kilwa Kivinje ==
The change of governorship to Julius von Soden, and then Friedrich von Schele, with the increasing military demands elsewhere, and the reduction in manpower in Kilwa, was accompanied by the emergence of Hassan bin Omari, as the chief of the Mavuji, apparently engaged once again in caravan raids and trade, and widespread looting, murder and burning. In the months following, he was charged with forcing others to hoist his own flag, instead of the German banner, and of appropriating weapons and gold. The attacks involved several places, from Kilwa to Kiswere, an ancient fishing village and harbour some distance south of Kilwa where, in November 1894, he had stolen goods from the customs office worth 17,000 rupees, and caused all Indian traders to abandon the place. Infractions of this kind continued sporadically into the following year. In October 1895, Wissmann's attention was drawn to the situation around Kilwa. He declared that Hassan bin Omari, in compelling villagers to raise his flag instead of the German flag, was unsupportable. Moreover, apart from daring to attack the German fort, he still dominated the vicinity to such an extent that no one could stray from this town for even half an hour, and messengers were intercepted and slain several times. In addition, Hassan bin Omari had bonded with Machemba, "the Yao adventurer, part Spartacus and part slave raider, who dominated the Makonde plateau".

Wissmann now considered it imperative that Hassan bin Omari should be destroyed and this state of affairs brought to an end. The emphatic punishment of him would not only be exemplary but might also influence possible resolutions of problems with other chieftains. He proclaimed a reward of 1000 rupees on his head, fines for chiefs who raised his flag, and assigned four companies through the commander of the Schutztruppe, the protective force, to engage with Hassan bin Omari. A boma was to be built at the site of his village for a permanent manning and for constant patrol of the area. The remaining two companies would strip the whole area of his influence and resubjugate the villages back into obedience to German rule. The war against him would proceed before the rainy season, a month and a half from then.

== The capture of Hassan bin Omari ==
In accordance with the aims of Wissmann, and after gaining the necessary approval, in November 1895, four companies of men were deployed. The 8th was in Kiswere, the 9th stripped the plains in the area outwards and the 3rd marched into the mountains up the river Mavuji. The 6th was encamped in Mavuji, building a 'boma' on a mountain ridge there. On the 13th, after a march from Kiswere from intelligence received, that Hassan bin Omari was with a Myao called Saidi Mitole in Mpingiro, he was again found to have escaped. Lieutenant Fromm then began a concealed march in pursuit, eventually learning that he had fled back to Mavuji. He then learnt by the Luawa river that Hassan bin Omari had a boma thereabouts, where he kept his many wives. On the 15th, they went in to the area at full speed, meeting only light resistance, and in the second push, Lieutenant Hans Glauning managed to get hold of two people, including a small hunchbacked man, [German:"eines kleinen buckligen Mannes"] who tried to defend himself with a knife. That was Hassan bin Omari. Soon after, his minister Omari Muenda and Jumbe were also captured. A certain infamous Scham bin Schaude escaped. Much munition and food was found and destroyed, in the explosion of which an underofficer, Lachemeier, was badly burnt. The following day they broke camp and returned to base on the 16th.

== The execution of Hassan bin Omari ==
During the eventual capture of Hassan bin Omari, a large cache of correspondence also fell into the hands of the troops. Hans Sache, accompanying the Governor, Wissmann, was appointed as examining magistrate, and a court-martial convened. Omari had kept his entire correspondence of many years of 'highly treasonous' letters. Carl Velten, the renowned Oriental scholar and German translator, was given the task of translating, in large part, the entries which were written in Arabic script. The investigation finally extended to more than a hundred people and could only be completed after seven weeks. Sixteen death sentences were carried out in all, along with Hassan bin Omari and Jumbe. Both, Makran bin Schaude, the wali, and the akida, Abdalla bin Omari, who since the 1888 uprising had enjoyed a trusted role in the service of the Government, were implicated and imprisoned, the former dying the first night in custody. Apart from those directly involved with the uprising, the entire city was found culpable, and fined, and most notably, Indian traders, who were discovered to have, in their confiscated books and ledgers, recorded repeated deliveries to a 'mshenzi'(pl: washenzi' a general Swahili ascription of inland people by coastal dwellers, indicating lack of civilisation), which was taken to refer to Hassan bin Omari. Four of the Indians, important respected members, were condemned to death, including one named in the Makunganya Shairi as Kassam Peera, but later this was commuted to chains and imprisonment, and eventually to fines after they had been deported, while still in chains, by ship to Dar es Salaam, and thence to Mombasa and Aden.

== The theft of his remains ==
The military doctor Friedrich Simon, who was appointed to the Schutztruppe of German East-Africa from 18 October 1893 until 22 August 1903, was tasked with the autopsy of Makunganya's body. He contacted the anthropologist Felix von Luschan, at the time assistant director of the Ethnological Museum of Berlin, who was at the time eager to acquire as many human remains from Africa as possible to substantiate theories of scientific racism. The military doctor shipped Hassan bin Omari's skull to Germany and Luschan added this head to his private teaching collection. Upon his death in 1924, his wife sold this collections of more than 4,000 skulls and other body parts from people from all over the world to the American Museum of Natural History, where they are still kept today.

== Epilogue ==
The mango tree, where the gallows had been set for the hangings, was known as the 'mwembe kinyonga' ('the hangman's mango tree'). This tree died, but the place was marked by an apparently inaccurate and crude monument, to "the fathers of Kilwa Kivinje hanged for their resistance to the Germans", which was once visited by Julius Nyerere at about the time of independence of Tanzania. Makunganya heads the list of names inscribed on the monument.

The whole episode of Hassan bin Omari was seen by most of the colonial settlers as an indication for the use of unsparing force against rebellion, with the actions in Kilwa Kivinje serving as an example to all. The ruthlessness was employed with the same vigor in the Maji Maji Rebellion a few years later.

It also fed fuel to many settlers' low estimation of the Indian population, who were considered to be similar to Jews in their usurious practices, their lack of commitment to the country, their lack of European methods of book-keeping, and their complicity with the rebels, all the while enjoying relative immunity by preserving their British status. An autopsy was performed on Hassan bin Omari, who had seemingly shown hermaphroditic physical characteristics, but the medical examination did not confirm this.

Sha'iri la Makunganya or "The Makunganya Poem", composed by Mzee bin 'Ali bin Kidogo bin al-Qadiri of Zanzibar, at the behest of Hans Sache, was based on second hand sources and, apart from its uncritical veneration of the German authorities, and of Wissmann and Sache in particular, contains several inaccuracies. However, given poetic licence, addressed to the residents of Kilwa, its refrain is salutary:
Leo mnajuta nini,
Baa la kujitakia?
["Today, what is it that you regret,
Disaster, which you wished for upon yourselves?"]

Machemba, the slave raider in the south with whom Hassan bin Omari had allegedly shaken hands, concluded a truce with the Germans. He later fell into disfavor and fled to Mozambique in 1899, after which he continually fought the Portuguese there until his death.
