= Karvonen =

Karvonen is a Finnish surname. Notable people with the surname include:

- Aki Karvonen (born 1957), Finnish cross-country skier
- Janet Karvonen, American basketball player
- Jorma Karvonen (born 1949), Finnish ski-orienteering competitor
- Juho Karvonen (1888–1966), Finnish logger and politician
- Jusu Karvonen (born 1993), Finnish footballer
- Martti J. Karvonen (1918–2009), Finnish medical doctor and exercise physiologist, known for the Karvonen method for determining a target heart rate for aerobic activity.
- Veikko Karvonen (1926–2007), Finnish marathon runner
