= Juku (disambiguation) =

Gakushū juku (Japanese: 学習塾) are Japanese private cram schools.

Juku may also refer to:

- Juku E5101 a personal computer based on a Soviet clone of the Intel i8080A produced in Estonia in 1980s-1990s
- Juku, an Estonian diminutive of the names Juhan or Johannes, commonly takes place of "Little Johnny" in Estonian jokes
- Rajat Dholakia a.k.a. Juku, an Indian film score composer in Hindi cinema
