= Juho =

- Gender: Male

Other names
- Related names: John

Juho is a male given name. It is an Estonian and Finnish variation of John. The name day for Juho in Finland is on June 24. Close variations of Juho are Johannes, Juhan, Juhana, Juhani, Juha, Jussi, Jukka, Jani and Janne (all sharing the same name day).

Between 2000 and 2006, 4,939 boys were given the name Juho in Finland.

== People with the given name Juho ==
- Juho Alasuutari (born 1990), Finnish footballer
- Juho Annala (born 1984), Finnish race car driver
- Juho Erkki Antila (1856–1920), Finnish politician
- Juho Astala (1860–1936), Finnish politician
- Juho Eerola (born 1975), Finnish politician
- Juho Hakkinen (1872–1918), Finnish politician
- Juho Halme (1888–1918), Finnish track and field athlete and Olympic competitor
- Juho Hänninen (born 1981), Finnish rally driver
- Juho Haveri (1876–1961), Finnish politician
- Juho Heikkinen (1863–1938), Finnish politician
- Juho Heiskanen (1889–1950), Finnish military Major General during World War II
- Juho August Hollo (1885–1967), Finnish translator and academic
- Juho Hyvönen (1891–1975), Finnish politician
- Juho Jaakonaho (1882– 1964), Finnish road racing cyclist and Olympic competitor
- Juho Jokinen (born 1986), Finnish ice hockey player
- Juho Kanniainen (1875–1929), Finnish politician
- Juho Karvonen (1888–1966), Finnish politician
- Juho Kauppinen (born 1986), Finnish musician (Korpiklaani)
- Juho Kekkonen (politician) (1890–1951), Finnish politician
- Juho Kekkonen (forester) (1873–1928), Finnish forester and tenant farmer
- Juho Keränen (born 1985), Finnish ice hockey player
- Juho Koivisto (1885–1975), Finnish politician
- Juho Kokko (1865–1939), Finnish politician
- Juho Kuosmanen (born 1979), Finnish film director
- Juho Laakso (1854–1915), Finnish politician
- Juho Lähde (born 1991), Finnish footballer
- Juho Lallukka (1852–1913), Finnish businessman and a patron of the arts
- Juho Lammikko (born 1996), Finnish ice hockey player
- Juho Lehmus (1858–1918), Finnish politician
- Juho Lepistö (1861–1941), Finnish politician
- Juho Mäkelä (born 1983), Finnish footballer
- Juho Malkamäki (1844–1928), Finnish politician
- Juho Matsalu (1911–1987), Estonian footballer
- Juho Merinen (1873–1918), Finnish politician
- Juho Mielonen (born 1987), Finnish ice hockey player
- Juho Mikkonen (born 1990), Finnish cross-country skier and Olympic competitor
- Juho Niukkanen (1888–1954), Finnish politician
- Juho Nykänen (born 1985), Finnish footballer
- Juho Kusti Paasikivi (1870–1956), Prime Minister of Finland in three cabinets and President of Finland
- Juho Paksujalka (1883–1951), Finnish politician
- Juho Paukku (born 1986), Finnish tennis player
- Juho Aarne Pekkalainen (1895–1958), Finnish sailor and Olympic medalist
- Juho Perälä (1887–1938), Finnish politician
- Juho Peura (1879–1918), Finnish politician
- Juho Rikkonen (1874–1918), Finnish politician
- Juho Julius Saaristo (1891–1969), Finnish track and field athlete and Olympic medalist
- Kaarlo Juho Ståhlberg (1865–1952), first President of Finland
- Juho Sunila (1875–1936), Prime Minister of Finland in two cabinets
- Juho Vennola (1872–1938), Prime Minister of Finland in two cabinets
