= Yao people (East Africa) =

Bantu ethnic group of Southeast Africa

Yao
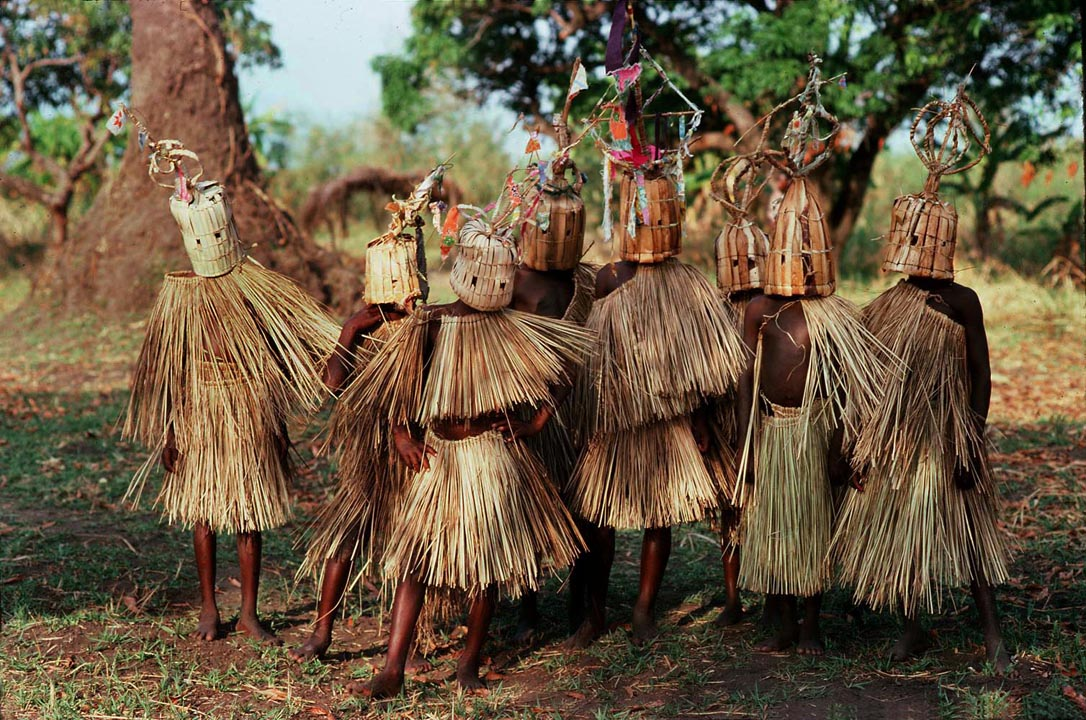
- Nine- to ten-year-old boys of the waYao tribe participating in circumcision and initiation rites (March 2005)

Total population
- 2,800,000 (2020)

Regions with significant populations
- Malawi: 2,321,763 (2018)
- Tanzania: 630,000 (2017)
- Mozambique: 450,000 (2020)

Languages
- Chiyao, Kiswahili

Religion
- Islam

Related ethnic groups
- Bantu peoples

- Person: 'Myao
- People: WaYao
- Language: chiYao
- Country: Uyao

The Yao people are a Bantu ethnic group living at the southern end of Lake Malawi. The Yao are a predominantly Muslim-faith group of about two million, whose homelands encompass the countries of Malawi, Tanzania, and the north of Mozambique.

== History ==
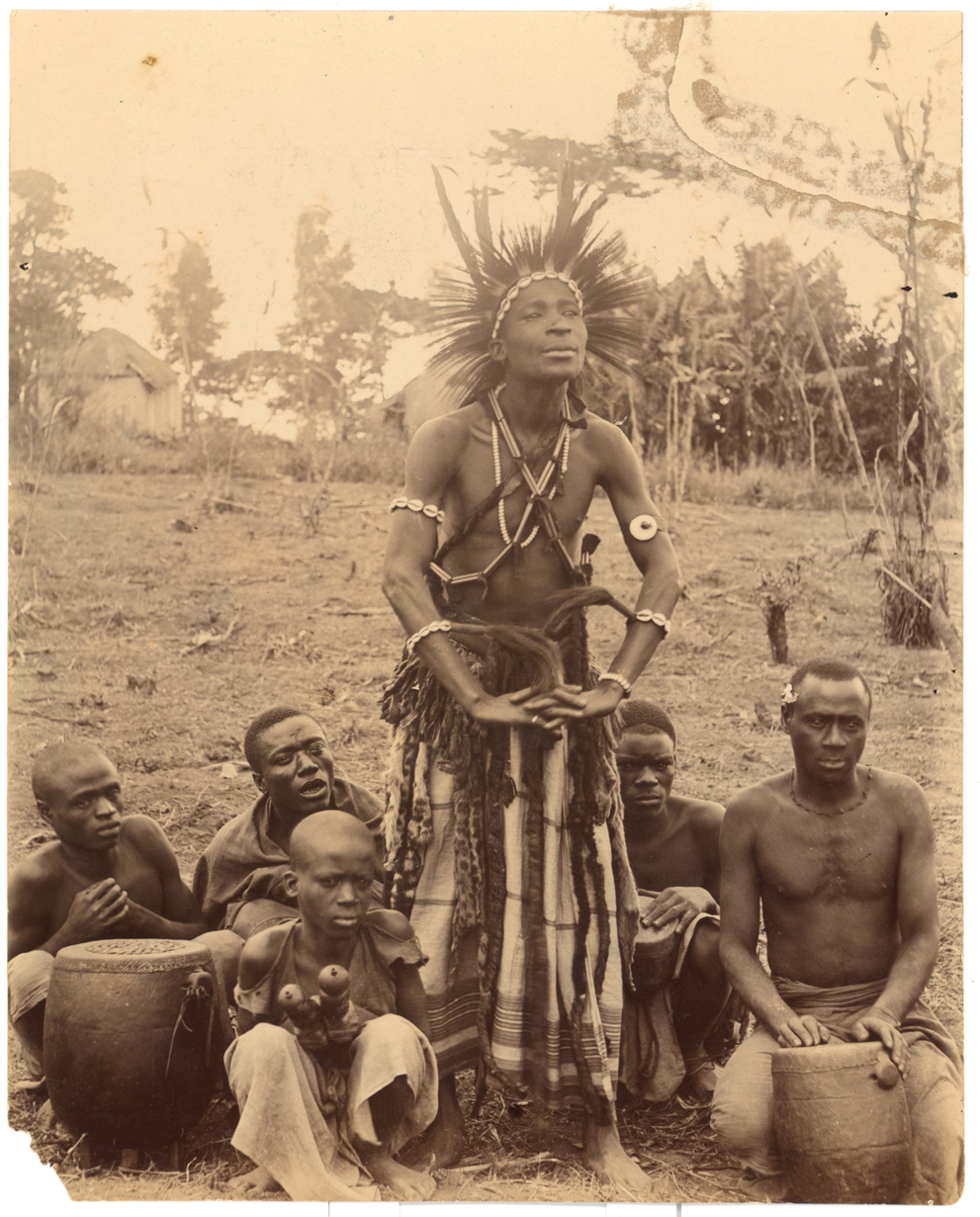
Yao dancing man, 1896

The majority of the Yao people are subsistence farmers and fishermen. When Arabs arrived on the southeastern coast of Africa, they began trading with the Yao people for ivory and grains, exchanged for clothes and weapons. They also traded in slaves. Yao kingdoms came into being, as Yao chiefs took control of the Niassa province of Mozambique in the 19th century. During that time, the Yao began to move from their traditional home to today's Malawi, which resulted in the Yao populations present today. Islam reached the Yao gradually during the 19th century. Chiefs and village headmen tended to convert first. In 1870, Makanjila III (one of the Mangochi Yao chiefs of the Nyasa area) adopted Islam as his personal and court religion.

Subsequently, through business relations with Arab and Swahili traders, the Yao chiefs (who called themselves “sultans”) needed scribes who were literate; thus, Islamic teachers were employed. Within the Yao villages, these scribes had a significant impact on the people, offering not only literacy but the social, religious and economic benefits of the Muslim coastal areas. Furthermore, the Yao sultans resisted Portuguese, British, and German colonial rule, which was viewed as a major cultural, political and economic (as well as personal) threat. The British tried to stop the ivory and slave trade, attacking some of the Yao trade caravans near the coast. Mataka II Nyenje allowed William Johnson of the Anglican Universities' Mission to Central Africa to work in Muembe in 1880. When the British seized one of his slave caravans the next year, Mataka suspected Johnson of spying and expelled him. He confirmed his allegiance to Islam at about the same time. With the prominence of the chiefs turning to Islam, their conversion influenced their subjects to do likewise. The folk Islam which the Yao people have embraced is syncretized with their traditional, animistic belief systems.

=== In Mozambique ===
The Yao originally lived in northern Mozambique (formerly Portuguese East Africa). The history of the Yao people, in Mozambique as a whole, shows that their ethno-geographic center was located in a small village called Chiconono, in the northwestern province of Niassa. The majority of Yao were mainly subsistence farmers, but some were also active as ivory and slave traders. They faced social and political strife with Portugal’s arrival (in today's Niassa Province) and subsequent establishment of the Niassa Company. Such Portuguese settlers took up residence in the region, founding cities and towns. In the process, they systematically destroyed the indigenous, independent farm-and-trade system and changed it to a plantation-based economy, under Portuguese authority. Portuguese-run agricultural plantations started to expand, offering paid labour to the tribal population, yet the Yao increasingly became poor plantation workers under Portuguese rule. However, they preserved their traditional culture and subsistency agriculture. As Muslims, the Yao would not withstand domination by the Portuguese, who forcibly offered them a Christian faith-based education, spoken in the Portuguese language.

At least 450,000 Yao people live in Mozambique. They largely occupy the eastern and northern part of Niassa province, and form about 40% of the population of Lichinga, the province capital. They keep a number of traditions alive, including following the wild greater honeyguide birds to find honey. They will, ultimately, smoke the bees out from the beehive, collect the honey and leave behind the wax for the honeyguide birds, whom relish the treat along with any honeybee larvae they find. A 2016 study of the Yao honey-hunters in northern Mozambique showed that the honeyguides responded to the traditional brrrr-hmm call of the honey-hunters. Hunters learn the call from their fathers and pass it on to their sons. The chances of finding a beehive were greatly increased when hunters used the traditional call. The study also mentions that the Yao consider adult and juvenile honeyguides to be separate species, and hunters report that the former but not the latter responds to the specific honey-hunting call.

=== Outside Mozambique ===
The Yao moved into what is now the eastern region of Malawi around the 1830s, when they were active as farmers and traders. Culturally, the Yao are primarily Muslim. The Yao had close ties with the Swahili on the coast during the late 19th century, and adopted some parts of their culture, such as architecture and religion, but still kept their own national identity. Their close cooperation with the Arabs gave them access to firearms, which gave them an advantage in their many wars against neighbouring peoples, such as the Ngoni and the Chewa. The Yao actively resisted the German forces that were colonizing Southeast Africa (roughly today's Tanzania, Rwanda, and Burundi). A particular example of Yao involvement in the resistance extended to the coastal areas of Kilwa Kivinje, Mikindani and Lindi on the southern coast of Tanzania in 1888, when the German East Africa Company officials attempted to take control of the coastal areas previously under the Sultan of Zanzibar. The Yao continued to defend their lucrative trade route from the Makanjila domains in southern Nyasa to Kilwa Kivinje over the following years, leading to the execution of one of the more prominent raiders, Hassan bin Omari (an associate of the Makanjila), in Kilwa Kivinje in 1895. On the other hand, by 1893, Harry Johnston, with his British forces, was able to declare that he had practically conquered all the Makanjila territory on the shores of Lake Nyasa. In 1890, King Machemba issued a declaration to Commander Hermann von Wissmann, stating that he was open to trade but not willing to submit to German authority. After further engagements, however, the Yao ended up surrendering to German forces.

== Language ==
The Yao speak a Bantu language known as Chiyao (chi- being the class prefix for "language"), with an estimated 1,000,000 speakers in Malawi, 495,000 in Mozambique, and 492,000 in Tanzania. The nationality's traditional homeland is located between the Rovuma and the Lugenda Rivers in northern Mozambique. They also speak the official languages of the countries they inhabit, Swahili in Tanzania, Chichewa in Malawi, and Portuguese in Mozambique.

== Health ==
Illnesses in Yao culture are believed to originate through physical reasons, curses or by breaking cultural taboos. In such situations where illness is believed to come from the latter two sources (folk illnesses), government health centers will rarely be consulted. Some folk illnesses known to the Yao include undubidwa (an illness affecting breastfeeding children due to jealousy from a sibling), and various "ndaka" illnesses that stem from contact that is made between those who are not sexually active with those who are (cold and hot).

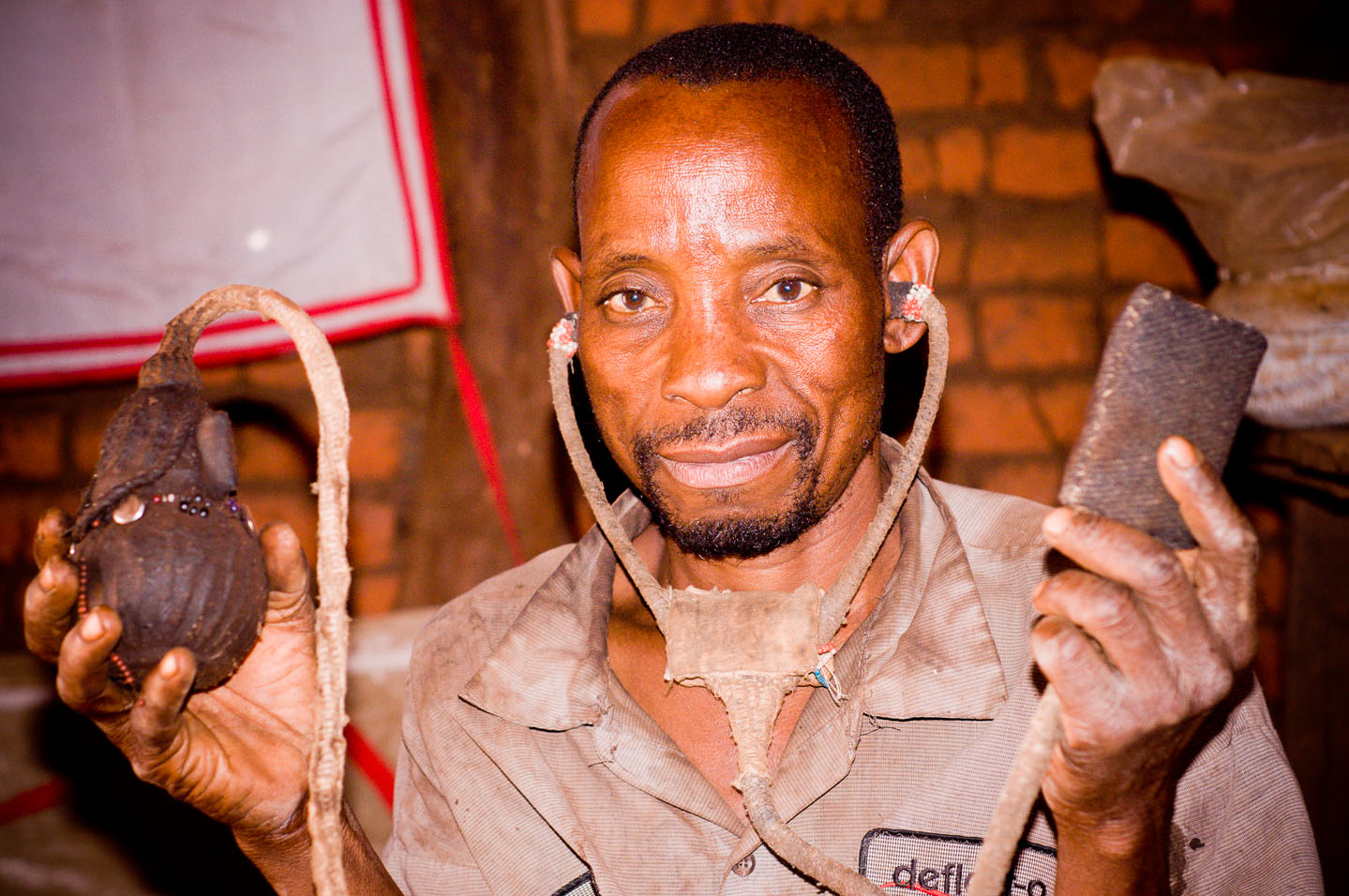
A Yao traditional doctor shows his homemade stethoscope he uses for treatment

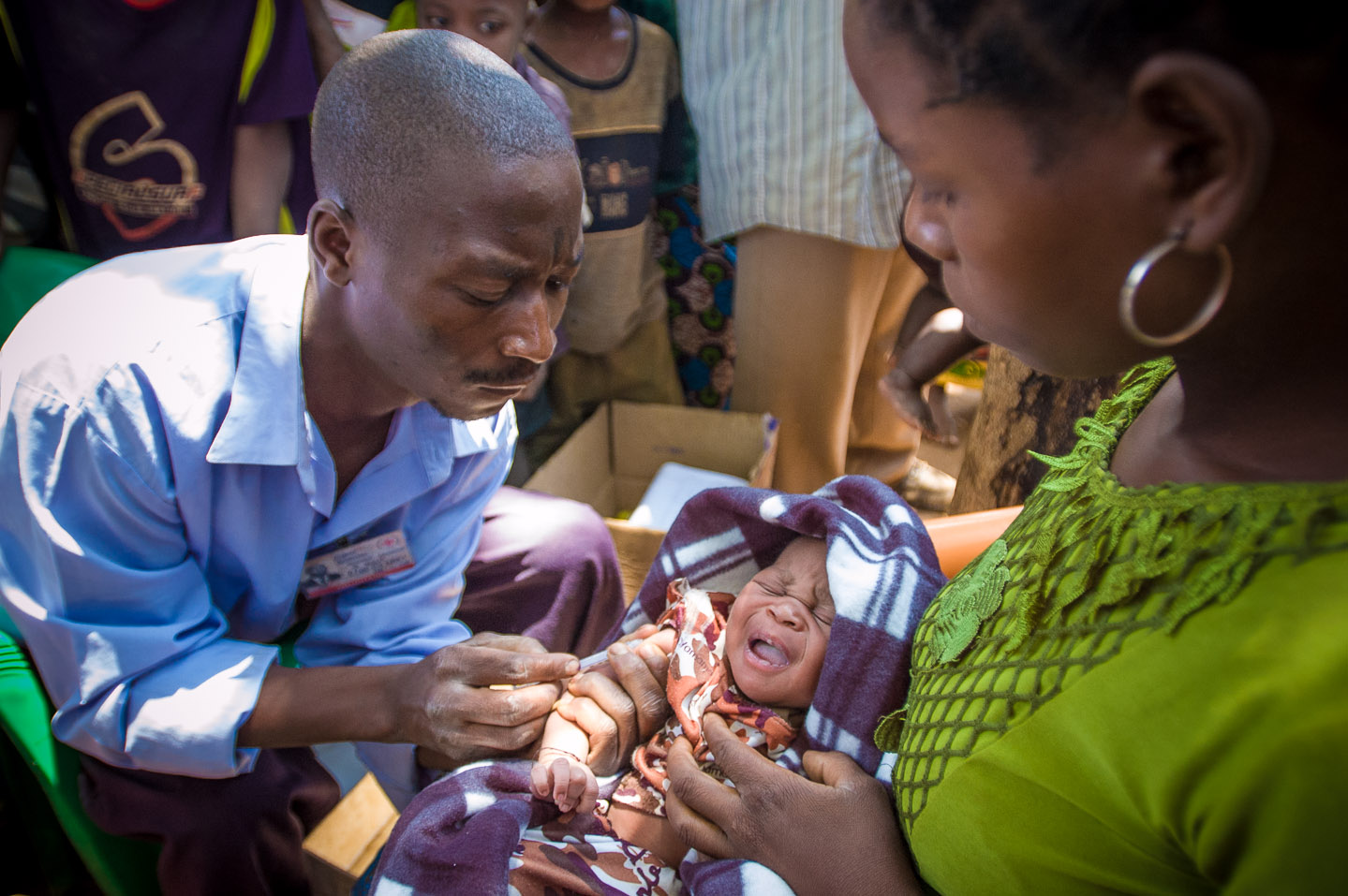
A Yao woman brings her child to a well baby check where it receives an injection in a rural village in northern Mozambique

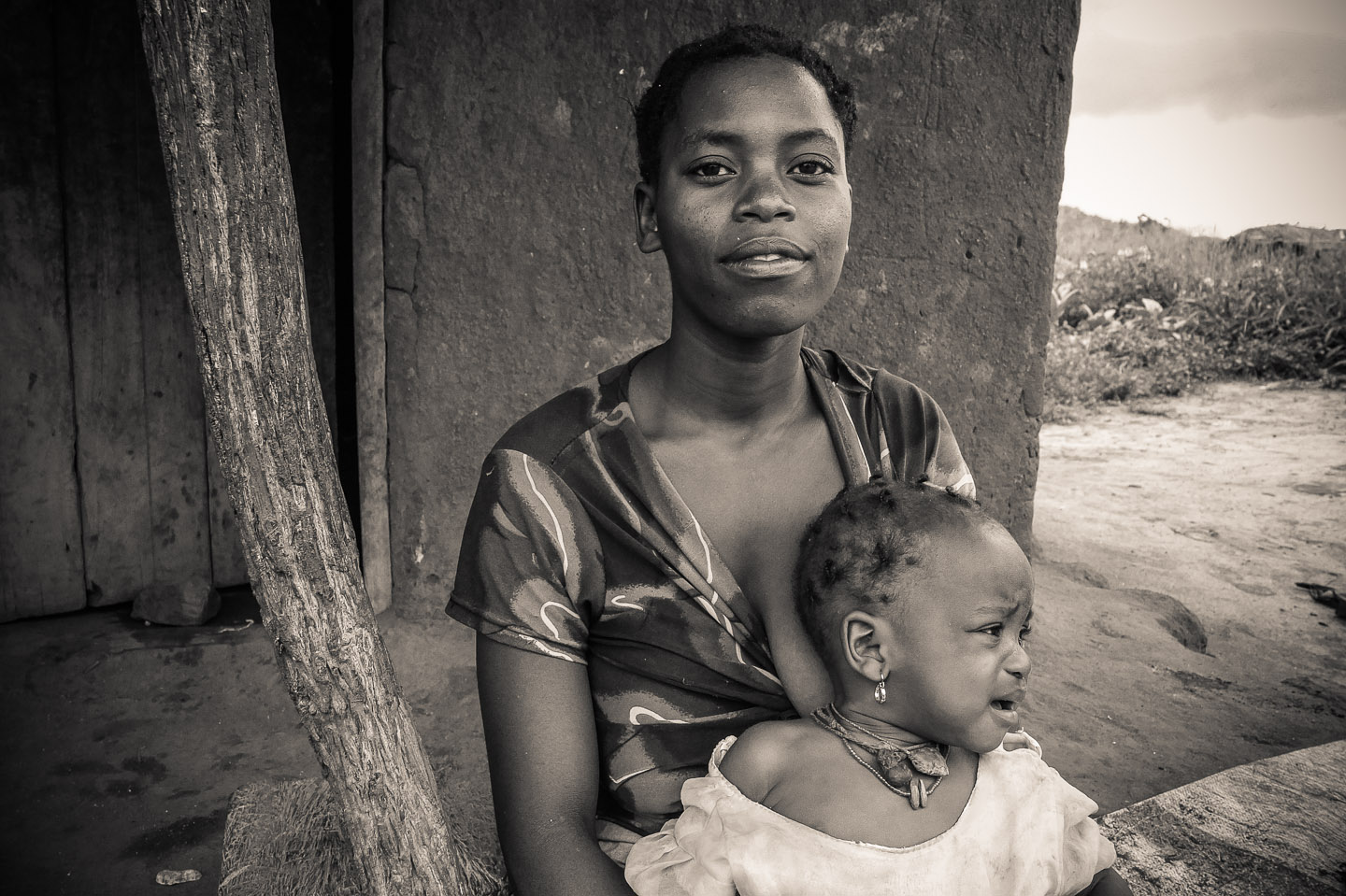
This young Yao mother tries to protect her child through charms worn around the neck

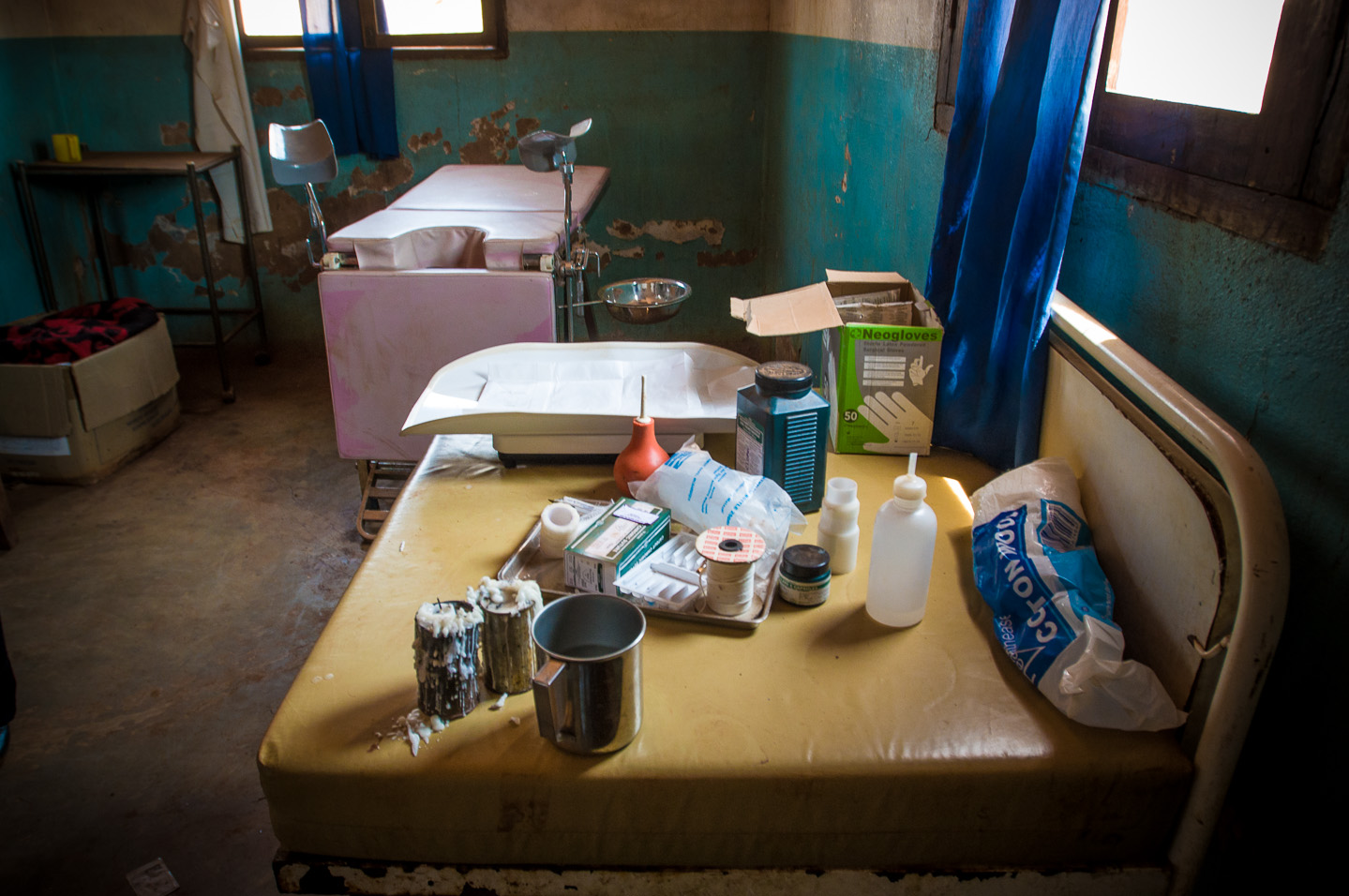
A peek inside the health post of Lissiete near Mandimba in Niassa, Mozambique

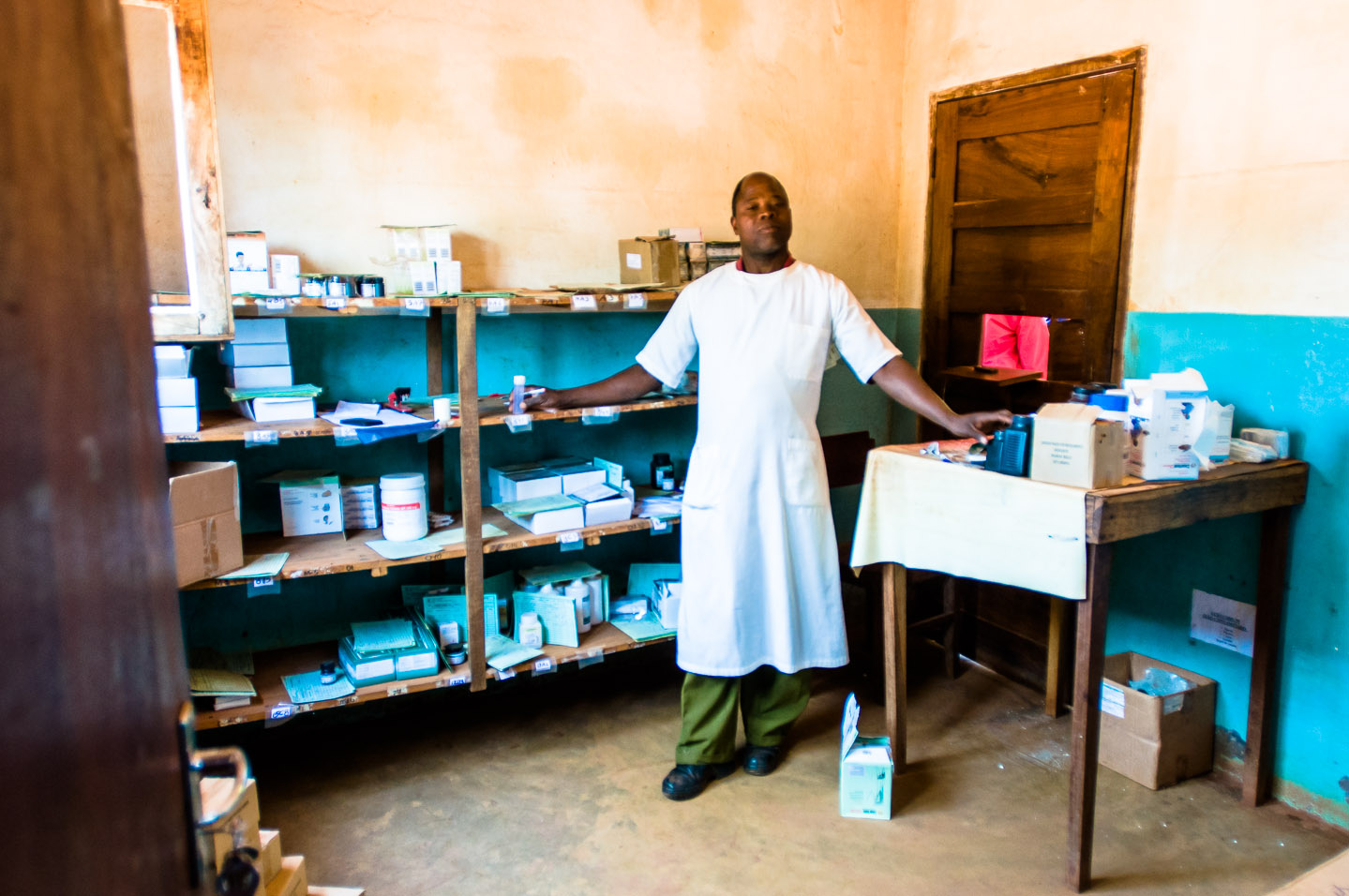
A pharmacist in Lissiete near Mandimba, Niassa Province poses with hospital medication

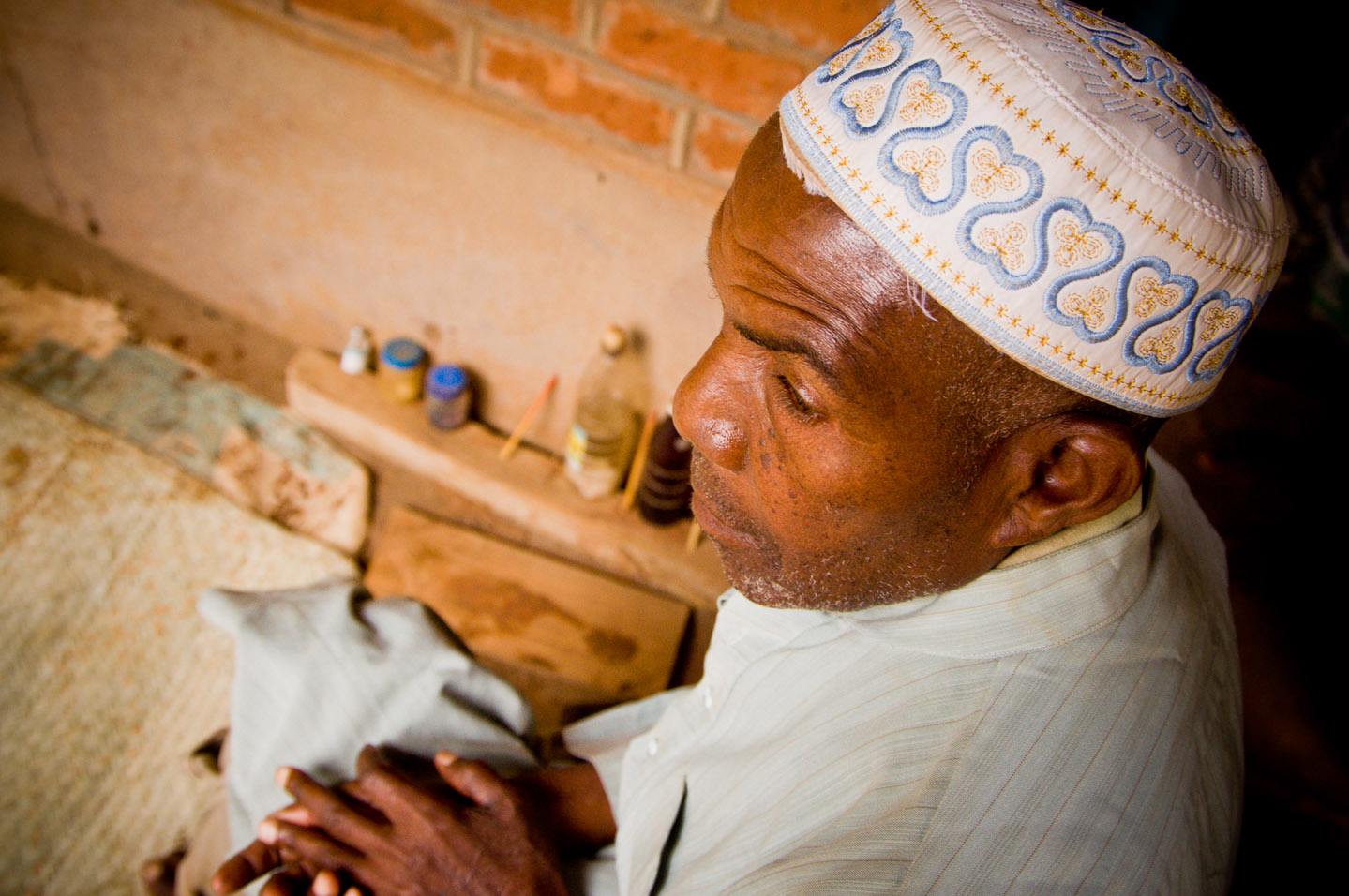
This Muslim Yao sheik in Malawi practices creating Islamic charms

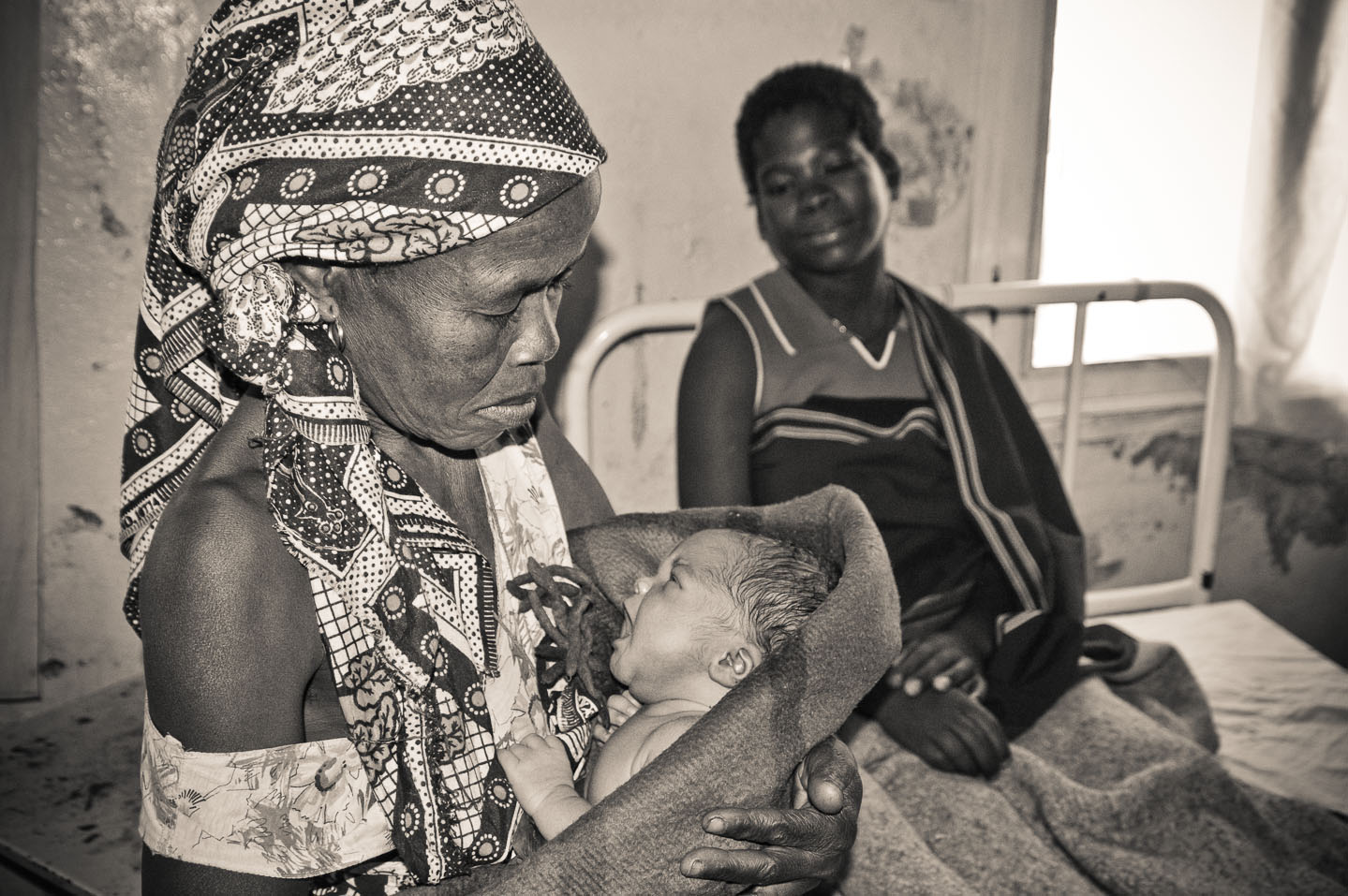
A happy grandmother holds a new baby after a successful delivery at the health post in Mandimba, Niassa Province, Mozambique

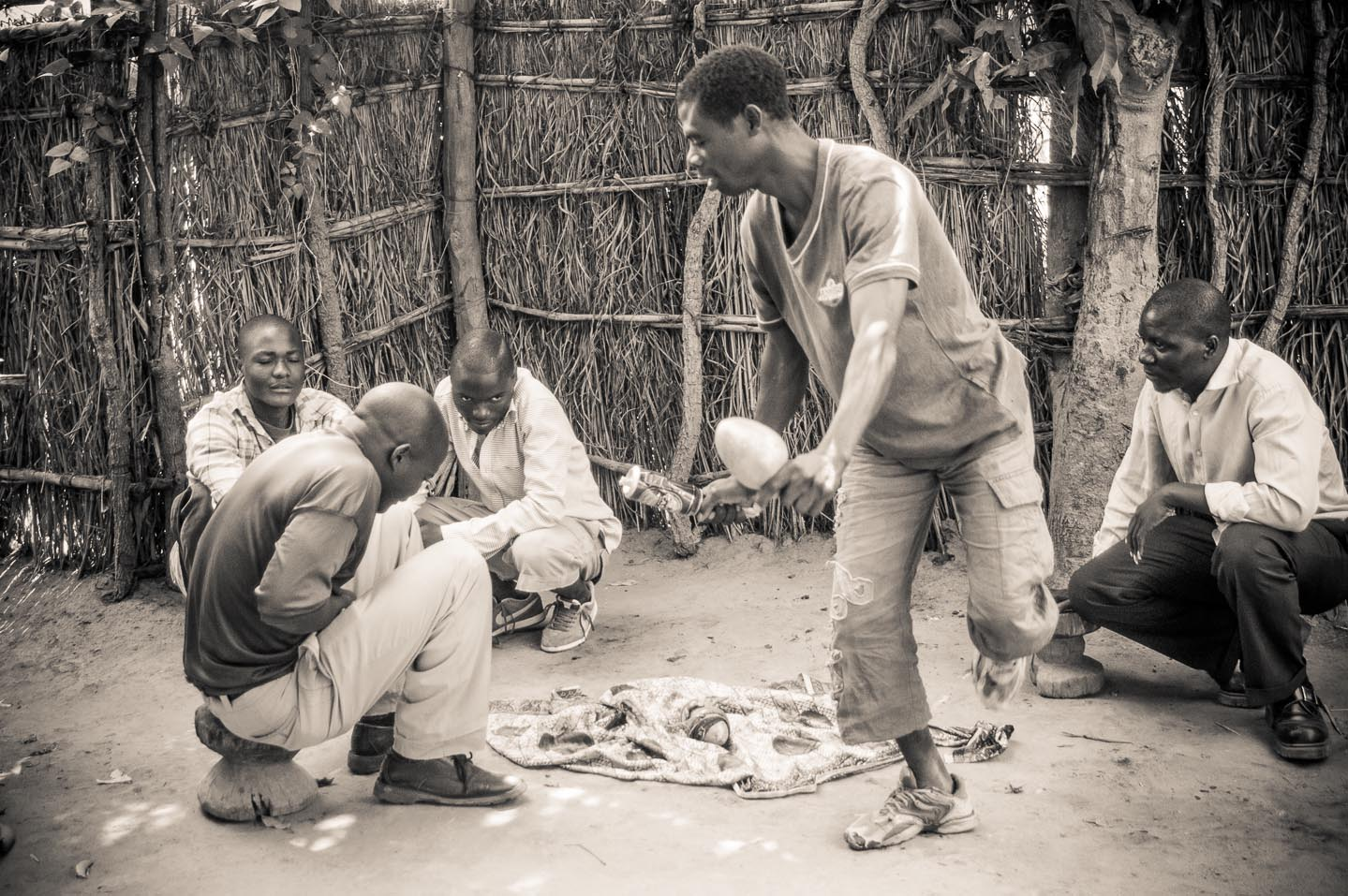
This drama troupe practices for a village-based drama about a sick man who refuses to treat his HIV/AIDS with proper medication

== Notable people ==
- Jacob Wainwright, attendant to David Livingstone
- Bakili Muluzi, 2nd President of Malawi
- Joyce Banda, 4th President of Malawi
- John Chilembwe, Malawian Baptist pastor and nationalist who led the 1915 Uprising against colonial rule.
- Shaaban bin Robert, Tanzanian poet
- Yohanna Barnaba Abdallah, linguist and historian
- Hassan bin Omari or Makunganya, Yao chief and anti-colonial fighter
- Sidi Mubarak Bombay, early Tanzanian explorer
- Leonard Mbotela, Kenyan journalist
- Mungo Murray Chisuse, a Malawian photographer whose portrait of John Chilembwe became iconic.
- Frank Mbeta, 21st Attorney General of Malawi

== See also ==
- Dances of the Yao
