= Jukka =

Jukka (pronounced [ˈjukːɑ]) is a common Finnish given name for males.

== History ==
Jukka is an old variant of the name Johannes, a biblical name spread over to Finland through Sweden with the introduction of Christianity. Jukka remained a nickname for people registered by authorities as Johan, Johannes, Juho etc., and did not appear in official records until the late 19th century. The name was added to the official list of first names in the Finnish almanac managed by the Almanac Office at the University of Helsinki in 1950, and its name day is June 24, also the name day of Johannes and other variants, and the traditional midsummer day, or Juhannus.

== Popularity ==
The name Jukka enjoyed the highest popularity in the years 1960–1979, though it was much used during the previous two decades as well. The 1980s and 1990s saw a marked decline in the name's popularity, and in recent years not many children have been named Jukka.

== As surname ==
Jukka is also a Finnish surname of Karelian origin, derived from the forename, and as of 5 February 2007 it is held by 201 Finnish citizens.

== Notable Jukkas ==
A list of notable holders of the name Jukka:

- Jukka Gustavson (born 1951), organist in the progressive rock band Wigwam
- Jukka Hentunen (born 1974), ice hockey player
- Jukka Hilden (born 1980), one of The Dudesons
- Jukka Jalonen (born 1962), ice hockey coach
- Jukka Jokikokko (born 1970), bassist in Burning Point and studio engineer
- Jukka Kajava (1942–2005), journalist and critic
- Jukka "J." Karjalainen (born 1957), musician
- Jukka Keskisalo (born 1981), steeplechaser
- Jukka "Yucca" Kalervo Korpela (born 1952), non-fiction author
- Jukka Korpela (born 1957), professor, historian
- Jukka Koskinen (born 1981), bassist of Wintersun
- Jukka Kuoppamäki (born 1942), musician
- Jukka Laaksonen (born 1958), impressionist
- Jukka Lehtovaara (born 1988), football goalkeeper
- Jukka Lewis (born 1963), bassist in Yö
- Jukka Mikkola (1943–2018), politician
- Jukka "Sir Christus" Mikkonen (born 1979), guitarist in Negative
- Jukka Nevalainen (born 1978), former drummer of the symphonic metal band Nightwish
- Jukka Orma (born 1956), guitarist in Sielun Veljet
- Jukka Paarma (born 1942), archbishop emeritus of the Evangelical Lutheran Church of Finland
- Jukka Parkkinen (born 1948), author
- Jukka Pietikäinen (born 1956), diplomat
- Jukka Perko (born 1968), jazz saxophonist
- Jukka Puotila (born 1955), actor, comedian, and impressionist
- Jukka Raitala (born 1988), football player
- Jukka Rasila (born 1969), actor
- Jukka Rauhala (born 1959), freestyle wrestling Olympic medalist
- Jukka Reverberi (born 1979), Italian singer of the group Giardini di Mirò
- Jukka "Jukka Poika" Rousu (born 1981), reggae musician
- Jukka Rintala (born 1952), fashion designer
- Jukka Rislakki (born 1945), journalist and author
- Jukka-Pekka Saraste (born 1956), conductor and violinist
- Jukka Sipilä (1936–2004), actor
- Jukka Takalo, musician
- Jukka Tilsa (born 1961), cartoonist
- Jukka Toijala (born 1972), basketball coach and former player
- Jukka Toivola (1949–2011), long-distance runner
- Jukka Tolonen (born 1952), guitar virtuoso
- Jukka Vieno (born 1957), Finnish writer
- Jukka Virtanen (1933–2019), author, actor, director, journalist, media person
- Jukka Virtanen (born 1959), ice hockey player

== Fictional Jukkas ==
- Jörö-Jukka, Finnish name of the German Struwwelpeter character
- Unijukka, a Finnish name of the Sandman
- Jukka Sarasti, a vampire in the novel Blindsight

== Other uses ==
- jukkapalmu, Finnish name of the common houseplant Yucca elephantipes
- tiskijukka, Finnish word for disc jockey with a nonsensical literal meaning, much less frequently used than DJ or deejii, or deejay by the English pronunciation
