= Jóannes =

- Gender: Male
- Language: Faroese

Origin
- Origin: Old Norse
- Region of origin: Faroe Islands

Other names
- Related names: John, Johannes, Jan, Jaan, Jean, Juan, Giovanni

Jóannes is a Faroese masculine given name. It is a variation of the name Johannes and a cognate of the name John. People bearing the name Jóannes include:

- Jóannes Bjartalíð (born 1996), Faroese footballer
- Jóannes Danielsen (born 1997), Faroese footballer
- Jóannes Eidesgaard (born 1951), Faroese politician
- Jóannes Jakobsen (born 1961), Faroese footballer
- Jóannes Patursson (1866–1946), Faroese nationalist leader and poet
