= Aldona Niemczyk =

German politician (born 1969)

Member of the Berlin House of Representatives
- Incumbent
- Assumed office 2023

Personal details
- Born: Aldona Maria Niemczyk; 30 August 1969 (age 57) Katowice, Poland
- Party: Christian Democratic Union
- Website: aldona-niemczyk.de

Aldona Maria Niemczyk (born 30 August 1969) is a German politician from the Christian Democratic Union (CDU). She has been a member of the Berlin House of Representatives since 2023.

== Biography ==
Niemczyk came to Berlin in 1990 as a resettler of German descent. After completing a German language course at the Otto Benecke Foundation, she graduated from the Hermann-Ehlers-Gymnasium in Berlin-Steglitz. She then studied social pedagogy and social work at the Evangelische Hochschule Berlin. Following her studies, she worked for the Berlin State Office for Health and Social Affairs. With the decline in the number of resettlers, she transferred to the Central Reception Center for Refugees in Berlin. From 2016 until her election to the Berlin House of Representatives in 2023, she worked for the State Office for Refugee Affairs. She also serves as a lay judge at the Berlin Social Court.

Niemczyk has a son.

== Political career ==
Niemczyk is a member of the CDU. She ran in the 2021 Berlin state election in the Charlottenburg-Wilmersdorf 4 constituency but failed to win a seat. In the 2023 repeat election, she won the direct mandate in the Charlottenburg-Wilmersdorf 4 constituency and was elected to the House of Representatives.
