= Yohan (name) =

Yohan is a male given name of many origins.

Yohan is a Hebrew given name, which was adopted as John. Similarly Yohanan was adopted as Jonathan.

Notable people with the name include:

- Yohan Benalouane (born 1987), Tunisian football player
- Yohan Betsch (born 1987), French football player
- Yohan Blake (born 1989), Jamaican athlete
- Yohan Cabaye (born 1986), French football player
- Yohan Goonasekera (born 1957), Sri Lankan Sinhala cricketer
- Yohan Goutt Gonçalves (born 1994), Timorese skier
- Yohan Kende (born 1949), Israeli Olympic swimmer
- Yohan Le Bourhis (born 2000), Canadian soccer player
- Yohan Lidon (born 1983), French kickboxer
- Yohan Montès (born 1985), French rugby player
- Yohan Ramírez (born 1995), Dominican baseball player
- Yohan de Silva (born 1985), Sri Lankan Sinhala cricketer
- Yohan Tavares (born 1988), Portuguese football player

== See also ==
- Yo-han
- Yohannes (disambiguation)
- Johannes
