= Janno Jürisson =

Estonian footballer (born 1980)

Personal information
- Date of birth: 6 October 1980 (age 46)
- Place of birth: Viljandi, then part of Estonian SSR, Soviet Union
- Height: 1.74 m (5 ft 9 in)
- Position: Midfielder

Senior career*
| Years | Team | Apps | (Gls) |
| 1995–1999 | Viljandi JK Tulevik | ? | (?) |
| 1995–1998 | → Viljandi JK Tulevik II | 7 | (2) |
| 1998–1999 | → FC Valga | 16 | (4) |
| 2000–2001 | Tallinna FC Flora | 29 | (1) |
| 2001 | → FC Valga | 23 | (4) |
| 2002–2003 | Viljandi JK Tulevik | 33 | (1) |
| 2002 | → FC Elva | 4 | (1) |
| 2005–2010 | Nõmme United | 109 | (27) |
| 2011 | Viljandi JK Tulevik | 8 | (0) |

International career
| 1995 | Estonia U16 | | |
| 1996 | Estonia U17 | | |
| 1997–1998 | Estonia U19 | | |
| 1998–2001 | Estonia U21 | | |
| 2000 | Estonia | 6 | (0) |
- * Club domestic league appearances and goals

Janno Jürisson (born 6 October 1980) is a former Estonian professional footballer who played as a midfielder.
