= Akida =

Akida was a title of indigenous rural officials in Tanganyika. At the time of the Zanzibar Sultanate, they acted as commanders of military divisions, and needed the approval of the sultan. During the German East African rule, the Germans adopted the title from pre-colonial Zanzibar-based administration, investing it with greater power. Under German rule, akidas ruled over so-called Akidate, an intermediate level of government between regional governors and minor countryside chiefs (called jumbe) and functioned as tax collectors, policemen, and lower judges. Their judicial role was recognized under the British colonial administration which took over from Germany following World War I.
