= Juho Lepistö =

Finnish politician (1861–1941)

Johannes (Juho) Lepistö (25 January 1861, Hartola – 25 February 1941) was a Finnish farmer and politician. He was a member of the Parliament of Finland from 1907 to 1908, representing the Finnish Party.
