= Yohanna Barnaba Abdallah =

Mozambican clergyman and historian

Yohanna Barnaba Abdallah (died 1924) was a clergyman and historian of the Yao people of central Africa.

== Life ==
Abdallah was born in northern Mozambique, and was the stepson of Barnaba, a village chief.

He was ordained as an Anglican priest at Likoma Cathedral in 1898. After a brief stint at Zanzibar, he took up residence at the Unangu station on the east side of Lake Malawi, eventually spending most of his career there. He was the first priest to be ordained in the Diocese of Nyasaland. He made a pilgrimage to the Holy Land in 1905. In 1924, Father Abdallah, en route to the coast for a holiday fell seriously ill in Medo, and died, possibly of pneumonia, on 11th Feb 1924.

Abdallah was noted as a scholar of the Greek language and of the Bible, but his chief claim to fame is his Chikala cha Wayao, a seminal study of the Yao people and Yao language. It was translated by Meredith Sanderson and published in 1919, and republished in 1973.
