= Juho Kokko =

Finnish politician

Juho Pekka Kokko (28 May 1865 in Kontiolahti – 27 May 1939) was a Finnish schoolteacher, farmer and politician. He was a member of the Parliament of Finland from 1913 to 1922, representing the Agrarian League.
