= Michelle D. Johannes =

American volleyball player and physicist

Michelle D. Johannes is an American volleyball player and physicist. She was a star player on the volleyball team for Mount Holyoke College in the early 1990s, and then became a research physicist for the United States Naval Research Laboratory, where her research concerns theoretical and computational condensed matter physics including the physics of superconductors and electric batteries.

== College volleyball ==
Johannes was a student athlete at Mount Holyoke College, playing volleyball in the New England Women's 8 Conference, a precursor to the New England Women's and Men's Athletic Conference. She was named by the College Sports Information Directors of America to the Academic All-America teams in 1990, 1991, and 1992, and was the 1992 New England Women's 8 Conference player of the year. After graduating from Mount Holyoke in 1993, Johannes spent a year as a volleyball coach before turning to her later career in physics.

Johannes was named to the Mount Holyoke Athletics Hall of Fame in 2017. In 2020 she was named to the Academic All-America Hall of Fame. She became the first Hall of Fame inductee from Mount Holyoke and from the Seven Sisters.

== Physics ==
As a student at Mount Holyoke, Johannes majored in physics, with a minor in French. She graduated magna cum laude and Phi Beta Kappa in 1993, and returned to physics a year later as a laboratory instructor in physics at Mount Holyoke. In 1997 she turned to graduate study in physics at the University of California, Davis, earning a master's degree in 1999 and completing her Ph.D. in 2003, advised by Warren Pickett. Her doctoral dissertation was Computational Investigation of Magnetic Interactions: Combining First Principles and Model Approaches.

Pickett had previously worked for the United States Naval Research Laboratory (NRL), and at his suggestion she came to NRL as a postdoctoral researcher in 2003, supported by a fellowship from the National Research Council. She obtained a permanent position at the laboratory in 2005, and was named as Section Head for the Theory of Advanced Functional Materials Section in the Material Science & Technology Division in 2015.

At NRL, Johannes's early work concerned the interactions between superconductivity and magnetism, and the mechanisms by which iron-based superconductors work, focusing on the roles played by Fermi surface nesting and charge density waves in this behavior. Later, her interests shifted to the materials science underlying lithium-ion batteries, the diffusion of Lithium ions into the battery during its operation, and more generally the study of electrodes at the nanoscale.

Johannes was named as a 2011 Sigma Xi Young Investigator. She was elected as a 2012 Fellow of the American Physical Society (APS), after a nomination from the APS Division of Computational Physics, "for computational work that has made a strong impact in novel superconductivity, magnetism, charge density waves and battery electrode materials. Her calculations have contributed to understanding and explaining the underlying physics that governs the properties of widely diverse materials."
