= Johan Geibert =

Swedish Bandy player (born 1977)

Johan Geibert (born 27 September 1977) is a Swedish bandy player who played for Västerås SK as a midfielder. He was a youth product of Västerås SK and made his first team debut in the 1997/98 season.
