= Johan Falkmar =

Swedish footballer

Personal information
- Date of birth: 10 November 1991 (age 35)
- Place of birth: Sweden
- Height: 1.87 m (6 ft 2 in)
- Position: Right back

Youth career
- Karlstad BK

Senior career*
Years	Team	Apps	(Gls)
2010–2014	Karlstad BK	74	(1)
2014–2017	Vasalunds IF	47	(0)
2010–2014	Karlstad BK	0	(0)
2017–2019	IF Brommapojkarna	50	(1)
2020	Dalkurd FF	11	(0)
- * Club domestic league appearances and goals as of 21 November 2020

Johan Falkmar (born 10 November 1991) is a Swedish footballer.

== Career ==
=== Dalkurd FF ===
In December 2019, Falkmar signed a two-year contract with Dalkurd FF.
