= Johan Raid =

Estonian politician

Johan Raid (born Johan Reinhold; 22 June 1885 – 4 July 1964) was an Estonian politician and civil servant.

Raid was born in Ranna Parish (now Peipsiääre Parish), Kreis Dorpat, in the Governorate of Livonia. From 1931 until 1932, he was Minister of Justice and Internal Affairs. During the German occupation of Estonia, from 1941 until 1944, Laid served as a department chief in the Directorate for Internal Affairs of the Estonian Self-Administration of Generalbezirk Estland. In 1944, as the Red Army was approaching, Laid fled to Sweden. He died in Uppsala in 1964, aged 79.
