= Johan Teterissa =

Indonesian activist

The flag of the Republic of the South Moluccas, or Republik Maluku Selatan, which is illegal to display or possess in Indonesia.

Johan Teterissa (born c. 1961 – December 4th, 2019) was a Moluccan elementary school teacher, activist and member of the Republic of the South Moluccas, or RMS, an active separatist group which advocates independence for the Maluku islands from Indonesia. Teterissa was sentenced to life in prison for treason in April 2008 after leading a nonviolent protest against Indonesian rule in 2007. Teterissa, and a group of 19 traditional Moluccan dancers, unfurled a secessionist flag of the banned South Moluccan Republic in front of Indonesian President Susilo Bambang Yudhoyono on June 29, 2007, in Ambon, the capital of Maluku. Amnesty International designated him a prisoner of conscience.

== 2007 Ambon protest ==
Teterissa is reported to have first joined the RMS in 2002 in his home village of Aboru, which is located in Central Maluku. Teterissa, who is an elementary school teacher by profession, had been arrested and given a lenient sentence in the past for a similar flag waving demonstration in 2003.

President Susilo Bambang Yudhoyono had arrived in Ambon, the capital of Maluku province, on June 29, 2007, to preside over an official ceremony marking National Family Day. A group of RMS protesters, led by Teterissa, peacefully disrupted the ceremony while President Yudhoyono was attending the event. The group of nineteen men, who were led by Teterissa, performed a traditional Moluccan war dance and then unfurled the secessionist flag of the banned South Moluccan Republic (RMS). Teterissa and the other protesters were immediately arrested.

Presidential aides to Yudhoyono described the President as "livid" over the flag waving protest. The Indonesian military and government blamed the National Intelligence Agency (BIN) for not anticipating a possible protest at the ceremony. The incident was considered to be a major embarrassment to the government of Indonesia. The protests prompted the government to remove and replace the Maluku provincial military and police chiefs.

== Trial ==
Johan Teterissa was convicted of "plotting against the state" and sentenced to life in prison on April 3, 2008 in the provincial capital city of Ambon by the Ambon District Court. Teterissa's life sentence is the maximum punishment for treason allowed under Indonesia's Criminal Code. Teterissa, who was 46 years old at the time of his sentencing, was reported to have broken down and cried as the guilty verdict and life sentence was handed down, according to Antara, Indonesia's state run news service. Teterissa told the Ambon judges that he had acted on the orders of Simon Saiya, the leader of the RMS who is wanted by Indonesian authorities. In their sentencing the judges told Teterissa that he had "embarrassed the people of Indonesia in the eyes of the world." They also told Teterissa that, as leader of the protest, his sentence was particularly harsh because he had shown no remorse for his actions.

Teterissa's life sentence for treason is believed to show the government of Indonesia's extreme sensitivity to separatist movements across the country, which consists of a sprawling archipelago of nearly 18,000 islands.

Indonesian court official Amin Syafrudin said that another 19 RSM activists had been convicted of treason chargers and sentenced to prison terms ranging from 10 to 20 years for their part in the June 2007 protests. They included Abraham Saiya, who was sentenced to 15 years in jail on April 3, 2008 for participating in the flag-waving demonstration. Four other Moluccan separatists were given similar prison sentences in March 2008 for displaying or possessing the RMS flag, which is banned in Indonesia.

=== Reactions ===
Human rights activists condemned Teterissa's life sentence for a nonviolent protest as excessive. Antonius Sujata, a former Indonesian deputy attorney general, called Teterissa's punishment, "emotional, political and nonsense." Sujata also told the media that, "The man only waved a flag and did not try to harm the President."

Asmara Nababan, who is the former secretary-general of the Indonesian National Commission on Human Rights told the media that the judges overreacted to the incident in their sentencing, as Teterissa's protest was nonviolent. "The judges should have deemed his action more as a political aspiration than a life-threatening act. He only waved an RMS flag, and did not carry a weapon."

Critics also pointed out that no separatists who took up arms against the government from two of Indonesia's more well known independence movements, Aceh and Papua, have been sentenced as harshly as Teterissa, who performed a nonviolent act. Many Papuan secessionists have avoided prosecution by handing over their weapons to government authorities. A number of Acehnese fighters were released as part of a peace agreement in 2005.

== Imprisonment ==
Amnesty International reported that in June 2012, Teterissa and other prisoners lacked access to clean drinking water. The following month, he was transferred to Batu Prison on Nusakambangan Island due to overcrowding. Upon his arrival, guards reportedly used electric cables to whip his back, causing Amnesty to issue an alert on Teterissa's behalf.

After 10 years of imprisonment, Johan Teterissa was released in December 2018. He died on 4 December 2019 less than a year after his parole and return to the Moluccas.

== See also ==
- Khoider Ali Ringirfuryaan
