= Johan Theron =

South African intelligence officer (born 1943)

Johan Theron (born c. 1943) was a former information officer in South Africa's apartheid government's Special Forces. Theron testified before South Africa's High Court during the trial of Wouter Basson for human rights crimes. Theron told the court that he had personally caused or supervised the murders of over 200 anti-apartheid political prisoners between 1979 and 1987. He claimed that the murders were merely a part of his job.

At the conclusion of the Wouter Basson trial in 2002, the presiding magistrate, Justice Hatzenburg, refused to grant Johan Theron indemnity from prosecution. Subsequent to the Basson trial, Theron never bothered to apply for amnesty from the South African Truth and Reconciliation Commission (TRC) as he was never formally charged with the crimes he claimed to have committed.
