= Johannes Barsch =

German politician (born 1994)

Member of the Landtag of Mecklenburg-Vorpommern
- Incumbent
- Assumed office 20 October 2026

Personal details
- Born: 1994 (age 31–32)
- Party: Social Democratic Party

Johannes Barsch (born 1994) is a German politician who was elected member of the Landtag of Mecklenburg-Vorpommern in 2026. From 2019 to 2021, he served as chairman of Jusos in Mecklenburg-Vorpommern.
