= Johan Frostegård =

Swedish writer and scientist (born 1959)

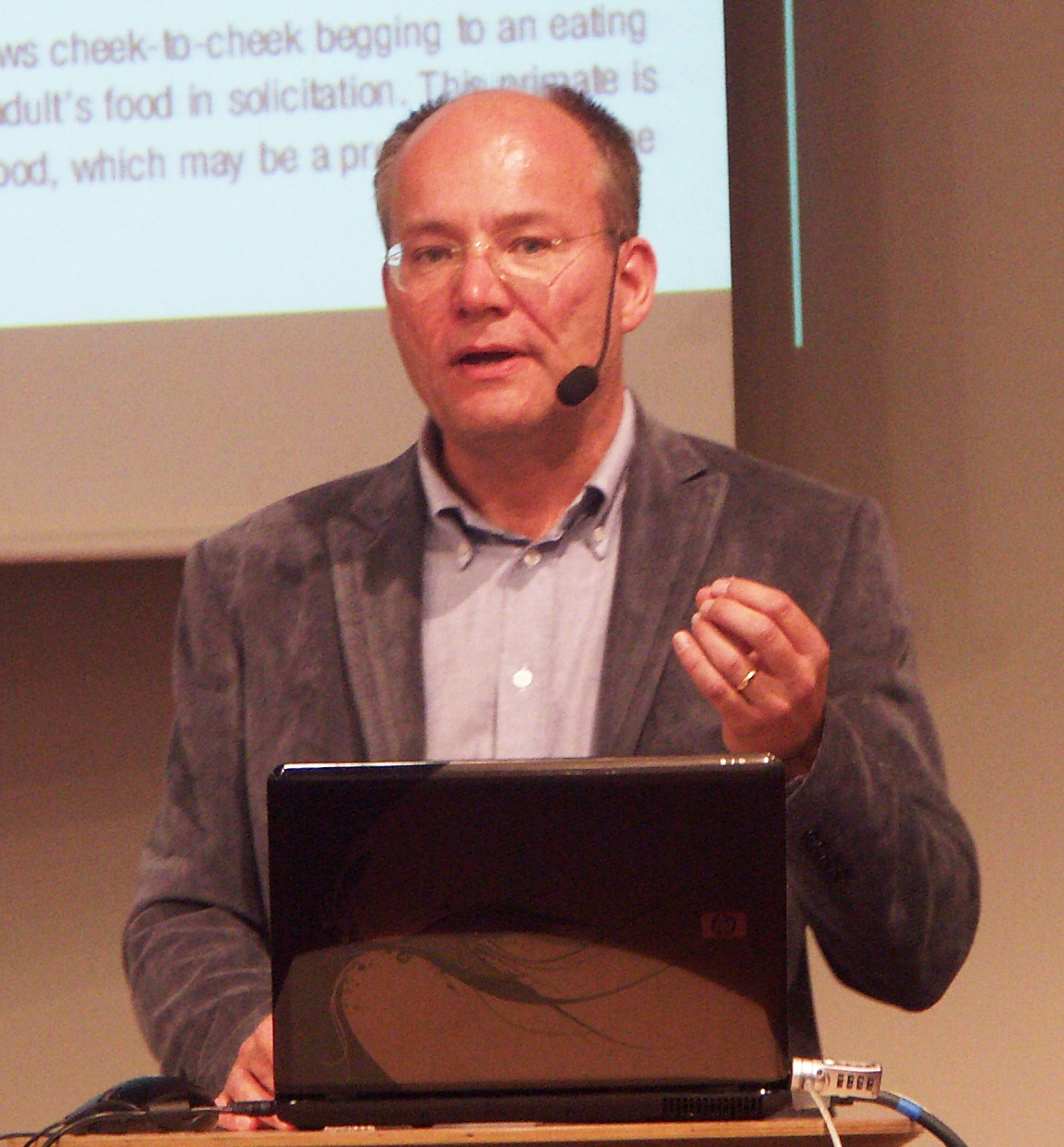
Johan Frostegård

Johan Frostegård, born 1959, is a Swedish professor of medicine, an inventor and a fiction and non-fiction writer.

Frostegård was born in Malmö, Sweden. He studied economics in Stockholm before pursuing a degree in medicine, later specializing in internal medicine and rheumatology. He received his PhD at Karolinska Institutet in 1992 and gained tenure as a professor there in 2003. He also holds a B.A. in the history of economics.

The main focus of Frostegård's research is the role of the immune system in the development and treatment of cardiovascular diseases.

Frostegård is a co-founder of four biotech startups: Athera Biotechnologies AB, Medirista AB, Medirista Biotechnologies AB and Annexin Pharmaceuticals AB, the latter being listed on Nasdaq First North since 2017.

Frostegård has written five novels, four poetry collections and several popular science books, centered around evolutionary perspectives on the humanities, economics and society. He has also written articles for various Swedish newspapers and magazines, notably opposing euthanasia.
