= Johan Kury =

Rwandan footballer (born 2001)

Personal information
- Full name: Johan Marvin Kury
- Date of birth: 7 October 2001 (age 25)
- Place of birth: La Chaux-de-Fonds, Switzerland
- Height: 1.78 m (5 ft 10 in)
- Position: Winger

Team information
- Current team: Bellinzona
- Number: 80

Youth career
- FC Boudry
- Neuchâtel Xamax
- 2018–2019: Biel-Bienne

Senior career*
| Years | Team | Apps | (Gls) |
| 2019–2020 | Neuchâtel Xamax U21 | 3 | (0) |
| 2020–2022 | La Chaux-de-Fonds | 9 | (0) |
| 2022–2025 | Yverdon-Sport II | 15 | (1) |
| 2022–2025 | Yverdon-Sport | 8 | (1) |
| 2025 | SR Delémont | 14 | (0) |
| 2025– | Bellinzona | 15 | (0) |

International career^{‡}
| 2026– | Rwanda | 1 | (0) |
- * Club domestic league appearances and goals as of 26 May 2026 ‡ National team caps and goals as of 15:07, 1 April 2026 (UTC)

Johan Marvin Kury (born 7 October 2001) is a professional football player who plays as a winger for Swiss Challenge League club Bellinzona. Born in Switzerland, he plays for the Rwanda national team.

== Club career ==
Kury is a product of the youth academies of the Swiss clubs FC Boudry, Neuchâtel Xamax and Biel-Bienne. He began his senior career with the Neuchâtel Xamax U21s in 2019, before moving to La Chaux-de-Fonds in 2020. In 2022, he joined Yverdon-Sport where he started making appearances in the Swiss Challenge League. He helped them win the 2022–23 Swiss Challenge League and earn promotion to the Swiss Super League. In September 2023, he suffered a knee injury that kept him off the pitch for a year. On 3 February 2025, he joined SR Delémont in the Swiss Promotion League. On 14 October 2025, he joined Swiss Challenge League club Bellinzona.

== International career ==
Kury was born in Switzerland to a Swiss father and Rwandan mother, and holds dual Swiss and Rwandan citizenship. He was called up to the Rwanda national team for a set of 2025 Africa Cup of Nations qualification matches in October 2024. He debuted in a friendly 2–0 win over Estonia on 30 March 2026.

== Honours ==
Yverdon-Sport

- Swiss Challenge League: 2022–23
