= Jóhannes Geir Jónsson =

Icelandic painter

Jóhannes Geir Jónsson (born 24. June 1927, d. 29. June 2003) was an Icelandic painter.

He was born and raised in Skagafjörður in northern Iceland. His father was a local schoolmaster; his much younger mother died from child labour when he was 9 years old. As a child Jóhannes demonstrated a talent for drawing and painting. When the time came, he eventually persuaded his father to allow him to pursue his artistic interests rather than the academic career pre-planned for him.

He studied art in Reykjavík and subsequently in Copenhagen in the late 1940s and early 1950s. Although he earned high remarks from his respected tutors, he initially had trouble making a living from his art after his homecoming, working mainly as an illustrator for advertisement agencies. He had trouble "finding his own style", and became depressive. Rather than painting the "classic" landscapes derivative of contemporary Icelandic artists, he began painting dark images from his youth in northern Iceland, seemingly haunted by the early loss of his mother and the strict (though caring) upbringing by his widowed father.

Around 1965 the local art community started taking notice of Jóhannes and his "dark, depressive" paintings. His Icelandic art was influenced by the works of Edvard Munch and Goya. Over the next few years he became one of the best known, best selling, and most respected painters in Iceland.

Success also spelled the end of his "depressive era". Instead he turned his attention to painting Icelandic landscapes, but now with his unique unmistakable style - characterized with bright shining colours depicting (or amplifying) the beauty of a sometimes dull landscape.

In the late 1970s, being an established successful artist, Jóhannes could divide some attention to one of his lifelong interests - The Viking Sagas - and incorporate them into his art. For the rest of his life, he made hundreds of illustrations based on the Sagas, ranging all the way from grand oil paintings to small pencil sketches.

Despite his failing health, Jóhannes kept on working until his dying day. He was one of the most prolific Icelandic artists of his generation, and his works decorate the walls of many public buildings as well as private homes in Iceland.
