= Juho Paksujalka =

Finnish politician

Juho Paksujalka (29 April 1883, Hiitola - 13 September 1951, Anjala) was a Finnish farmer and politician. He was a member of the Parliament of Finland from 1933 to 1936 and again from 1939 to 1948, representing the Agrarian League.
