= Yohannan =

- Gender: Male

Origin
- Origin: Syriac
- Region of origin: Middle East

Other names
- Related names: Yuhanna (Arabic), Youhannon (Malayalam), Yohanan (Hebrew), John

Yohannan (Classical Syriac: ܝܘܚܢܢ) is a Syriac name, from the Hebrew name Yohanan, equivalent to English John.

It may refer to:

- Yohannan the Leper, a.k.a. Yohannan Garba ("the Leper"), originally metropolitan of Nisibis, was anti-patriarch of the Church of the East between 691 and 693
- Yohannan I, a.k.a. Yohannan I bar Marta, patriarch of the Church of the East between 680 and 683
- Yohannan II, a.k.a. Yohannan II bar Narsai, Patriarch of the Church of the East from 884 to 891
- Yohannan III, the nephew of the patriarch Theodosius (853–858), was Patriarch of the Church of the East from 893 to 899
- Yohannan IV, Patriarch of the Church of the East from 900 to 905
- Yohannan V, Patriarch of the Church of the East from 1000 to 1011
- Yohannan VI, a.k.a. Yohannan VI bar Nazuk, Patriarch of the Church of the East from 1012 to 1016
- Yohannan VII, a.k.a. Yohannan VII bar Targhal, Patriarch of the Church of the East from 1049 to 1057
- Yohannan VIII Hormizd, a.k.a. John Hormez or Hanna Hormizd, Patriarch of the Chaldean Catholic Church (d. 1830)
- Yohannan, Metropolitan of India (c. 1490–1504)
- K. P. Yohannan (1950–2024), founder and president of Gospel for Asia; the Metropolitan of Believers Church
- T. C. Yohannan (born 1947), Indian long jumper
- Tim Yohannan (1945–1998), founder of Maximum Rocknroll, a radio show and fanzine documenting punk subculture

== See also ==
- John (given name)
- Yohanna (name)
- Yohanan (name)
