= Joanes Urkixo =

Basque writer

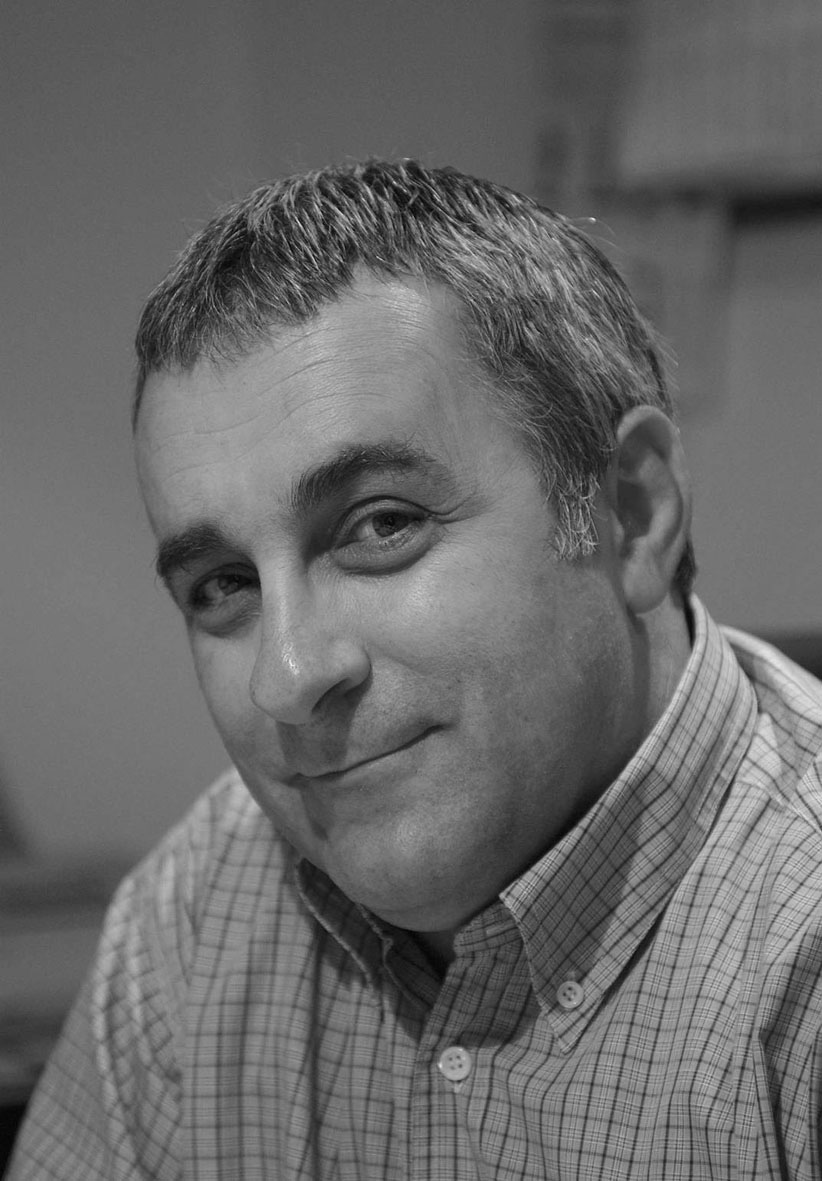
- Born: 11 June 1955 (age 71); Bilbao
- Education: University of Deusto
- Occupation: translator
- Writing career
- Language: Basque

Joanes Urkixo Beitia (born 11 June 1955) is a Basque language writer, and film and television writer.

== Life ==
Urkixo was born in Bilbao. He studied Basque philology at the University of Deusto. He worked as a professor of Basque and Spanish and as a translator and adapter of films and series (in Basque and Spanish). Between 1978 and 1980 he collaborated with the literary group Pott banda, of which were members Bernardo Atxaga, Joxemari Iturralde, and Joseba Sarrionandia. In 1983, he created the literary magazine Tua-ttua along with Laura Mintegi.

He has also contributed to various newspapers and magazines, including Euskadi Sioux, Anaitasuna, Pott, Argia, Susa, Egunkaria and Zehar.

In 2003 he was the winner of the V Abril Prize, given by Associate Editors, with his work Gerlari zuria (White War).

== Works ==
=== Narratives ===
- Elur gainean (1984, Erein)
- Lurra deika (1991, Erein)

=== Poetry ===
Berbak legezko aiztoak (1990, Susa)

=== Children's literature ===
- Patxi Trumoik letrak ikasi nahi ditu (1985, Erein)
- Patxi eta txoriaren bahiketa (1986, Erein)
- Shangai Tom espazioko zaindari (1992, Elkar)
- Bihotz ausarta (1996, Zubia)
- Thule (1998, Elkarlanean)
- Zeruak erori zirenekoa (1998, Ibaizabal)
- Lur izeneko oihana (2000, Zubia)
- Gerlari zuria (2003, Elkar)
- Argitxo Santageda egunean (2003, Ikastolen Federakundea)
- Argitxo iratxoa (2003, Ikastolen Federakundea)
- Argitxo eta Olentzero (2003, Ikastolen Federakundea)
- Argitxo Sanjuanetan (2003, Ikastolen Federakundea)
- Nerabeak eta beste munstro batzuk (2005, Aizkorri)

=== Theater ===
- Eta beharbada ispilu beltz bat (1981, BAK)

=== With other authors ===
- Cuentos Incombustibles II (1982, Bilboko Liburusaltzaileen Elkartea)
- Lore Kontu-Kontu Lore (1985, Ondarroako Kultur Etxea)
- Bilbao ipuin biltegia (2000, Bilboko Udala)
- Bilbao lerrorik lerro (2001, Bilboko udala)
- Bilbo inguruko ipuinak = Cuentos alrededor de Bilbao (2013, Bizkaiko Foru Adundia, Kultura Saila)

=== Translations ===
- Richard II (1985, Antzerti)
- SOS Lusitania (2016, Harriet)
- Autobusa berriro bera gabe abiatu zen egunekoa (2017, Harriet)
- Hegoak Astinduz (2017, Harriet)
- Wounded (2017, Harriet)
- Inozoen errua (2017, Harriet)
