= Juho Karvonen =

Finnish politician

Juho Karvonen (14 December 1888, Eno - 8 February 1966, Eno) was a Finnish logger and politician. He was a member of the Parliament of Finland from 1945 to 1962, representing the Social Democratic Party of Finland (SDP).
