= Jaanus =

Male given name

- Gender: Male
- Language: Estonian

Origin
- Region of origin: Estonia

Other names
- Related names: Jaan

Jaanus is an Estonian masculine given name, a version of John.

People named Jaanus include:

- Jaanus Karilaid (born 1977), Estonian politician
- Jaanus Kuum (1964–1998), Estonian-Norwegian cyclist
- Jaanus Männik (born 1951), Estonian politician
- Jaanus Marrandi (born 1963), Estonian politician
- Jaanus Nõgisto (born 1956), Estonian director, producer, composer and guitarist
- Jaanus Nõmmsalu (born 1981), Estonian volleyball player
- Jaanus Orgulas (1927–2011), Estonian actor
- Jaanus Rahumägi (born 1963), Estonian businessman and politician
- Jaanus Raidal (born 1963), Estonian politician
- Jaanus Sirel (born 1975), Estonian footballer
- Jaanus Tamkivi (born 1959), Estonian politician
- Jaanus Teppan (born 1962) Estonian cross-country skier
- Jaanus Uudmäe (born 1980), Estonian triple jumper
- Jaanus Vaiksoo (born 1967), Estonian children's writer, literary scholar, teacher and translator
- Jaanus Veensalu (born 1964), Estonian footballer
