= Johannes Kolleck =

German politician (born 1993)

Member of the Berlin House of Representatives
- Incumbent
- Assumed office 29 October 2026
- Constituency: Charlottenburg-Wilmersdorf

Personal details
- Born: 1993 (age 32–33)
- Party: Die Linke

Johannes Kolleck (born 1993) is a German politician serving as a member of the Berlin House of Representatives since 2026. He has served as co-chairman of Die Linke in Charlottenburg-Wilmersdorf since 2024.
