= List of painters by name beginning with "J" =

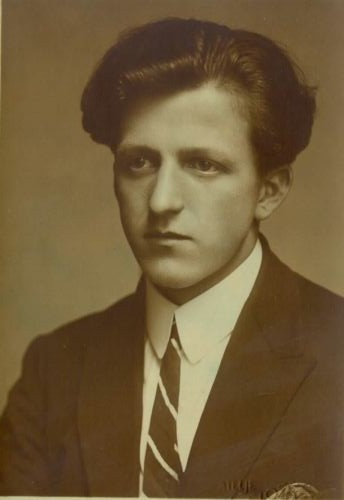
Božidar Jakac

Please add names of notable painters with a Wikipedia page, in precise English alphabetical order, using U.S. spelling conventions. Country and regional names refer to where painters worked for long periods, not to personal allegiances.

- Josef Jackerson (born 1936), Russian and Israeli painter
- A. B. Jackson (died 1981), American painter
- Francis Ernest Jackson (1872–1945), English painter, draftsman and poster designer
- Robert Jacobsen (1912–1993), Danish sculptor and painter
- Lambert Jacobsz (1598–1636), Dutch painter and preacher
- Yvonne Jacquette (1934–2023), American painter and print-maker
- Jan Jahn (1739–1802), Czech painter and art historian
- Božidar Jakac (1899–1989), Austro-Hungarian/Slovene painter, graphic artist and film-maker
- Július Jakoby (1903–1985), Austro-Hungarian (Slovak)/Czechoslovak painter
- Rihard Jakopič (1869–1943), Austro-Hungarian/Slovene painter
- Matija Jama (1872–1947), Austro-Hungarian/Slovene painter
- Shani Rhys James (born 1953), Welsh/English painter
- Terrell James (born 1955), American painter
- George Jamesone (c. 1587 – 1644), Scottish portrait painter
- Alfred Janes (1911–1999), Welsh/English artist
- Louis Janmot (1814–1892), French painter and poet
- Ruud Janssen (born 1959), Dutch painter and mail artist
- Ludmila Janovská (1907–after 1962), painter
- Derek Jarman (1942–1994), English artist, stage designer and film director
- James Jarvaise (1924–2015), American painter
- Eero Järnefelt (1863–1937), Finnish painter
- Karl Jauslin (1842–1904), Swiss painter
- Alexej von Jawlensky (1864–1941), Russian painter
- Ruth Jên (born 1964), Welsh artist and illustrator
- Viktor de Jeney (1902–1996), Hungarian/American painter
- William Jennys (1774–1859), American portrait painter
- Alfred Jensen (1903–1981), Guatemalan abstract painter
- Walther Jervolino (1944–2012), Italian Surrealist painter
- Ji Sheng, Chinese painter of the Ming Dynasty
- Yun-Fei Ji (季云飞, born 1963), Chinese/American painter
- Jiang Tingxi (蔣廷錫, 1669–1732), Chinese painter and editor
- Jiao Bingzhen (焦秉貞, 1689–1726), Chinese painter and astronomer
- Jin Nong (金農, 1687 – c. 1763–1764), Chinese painter and calligrapher
- Ferenc Joachim (1882–1964), Hungarian portrait painter
- Ted Joans (1928-2002), American surrealist, painter, poet and musician
- Chantal Joffe (born 1969), English painter
- Jóhannes Geir Jónsson (1927–2003), Icelandic painter
- Jóhannes Sveinsson Kjarval (1885–1972), Icelandic painter
- Augustus John (1878–1961), Welsh painter, draftsman and etcher
- Gwen John (1876–1939), Welsh painter
- Jasper Johns (born 1930), American painter and print-maker
- Mitchell Johnson (born 1964), American painter
- Sargent Johnson (1888–1967), American painter, potter and sculptor
- Allen Jones (born 1937), English painter, sculptor and lithographer
- Aneurin Jones (1930–2017), Welsh painter and art teacher
- Lois Mailou Jones (1905–1998), American painter
- Ludolf Leendertsz de Jongh (1616–1679), Dutch painter
- Johan Jongkind (1819–1891), Dutch painter and print-maker
- Alexander Johnston (1816–1891), Scottish painter
- Dorothy Johnstone (1892–1980), Scottish painter
- Zoltán Joó (born 1956), Hungarian painter
- Jacob Jordaens (1593–1678), Flemish painter
- Asger Jorn (1914–1973), Danish painter, sculptor and author
- Lily Delissa Joseph (1863–1940), English painter
- Josetsu (如拙, fl. 1405–1423), Japanese suiboku artist
- Jean Jouvenet (1644–1717), French painter
- Ju Chao (居巢, 1811–1865), Chinese painter
- Ju Lian (居廉, 1828–1904), Chinese painter
- Donald Judd (1928–1994), American artist
- Jens Juel (1745–1802), Danish portrait painter
- Júlíana Sveinsdóttir (1889–1966), Icelandic painter and textile artist
- Grethe Jürgens (1899–1981), German painter
- Gabrijel Jurkić (1886–1974), Bosnian artist
