= Virginia MOCA Boardwalk Art Show =

Annual art show in Virginia, USA

Virginia MOCA Boardwalk Art Show is a juried outdoor visual arts show held annually since 1956 on the Virginia Beach oceanfront boardwalk, organized by the Virginia Museum of Contemporary Art.

== History ==
After an informal 1952 art sale to benefit a local artist, participating artists founded the Virginia Beach Art Association (VBAA) — which had by 1956 founded and organized its annual Boardwalk Art Show. By 1962, VBAA membership had grown to 275. and the Boardwalk Art Show had become nationally recognized.

As of 1962, it came to light that VBAA and the Boardwalk Art Show were racially segregated, quietly refusing participation to African-American artists — as evidenced specifically by a refusal to admit A.B. "Alec" Jackson (1925-1981), head of the art department of the Virginia State College in Norfolk, who had applied to the 1962 show. As the issue became public, a vote of its 275 members was called, but less than 25% participated. Tension in the VBAA membership threatened to derail the 7th annual Boardwalk Art Show. Without overtly acknowledging its position, the 1962 show proceeded without Jackson and he was allowed membership in 1963. His oil painting Veronica's Veil received an honorable mention, and that same painting won The 1966 Boardwalk Art Show Best-in-Show, and in 1968 Jackson would go on to exhibit with the Smithsonian Institution.

A 1964 article in the Richmond Times Dispatch reported that the first show, in 1956, featured 30 artists. By 1964, the show, managed by Florence Turner of Virginia Beach, featured 358 artists "of any race, creed, color or talent" who had sales of $30,000 (roughly $305,000 2024), paying an entry fee of $7.50 ($75.00, 2024).

By 1965, the show represented approximately 500 artists, and as of the 2000s show exhibits the work of about 200 juried artists from across the United States, including painting, drawing, printmaking, sculpture, fiber arts, and glass, as well as clothing, jewelry, and furniture. The show is now held during October.

== Jury ==
Artists are juried: pre-selected jurors (differening each year) review applications invite about 200 artists and award about $25,000 in prizes, including a Best in Show prize which ranges from $5,000 - $10,000.
