= Virginia Museum of Contemporary Art =

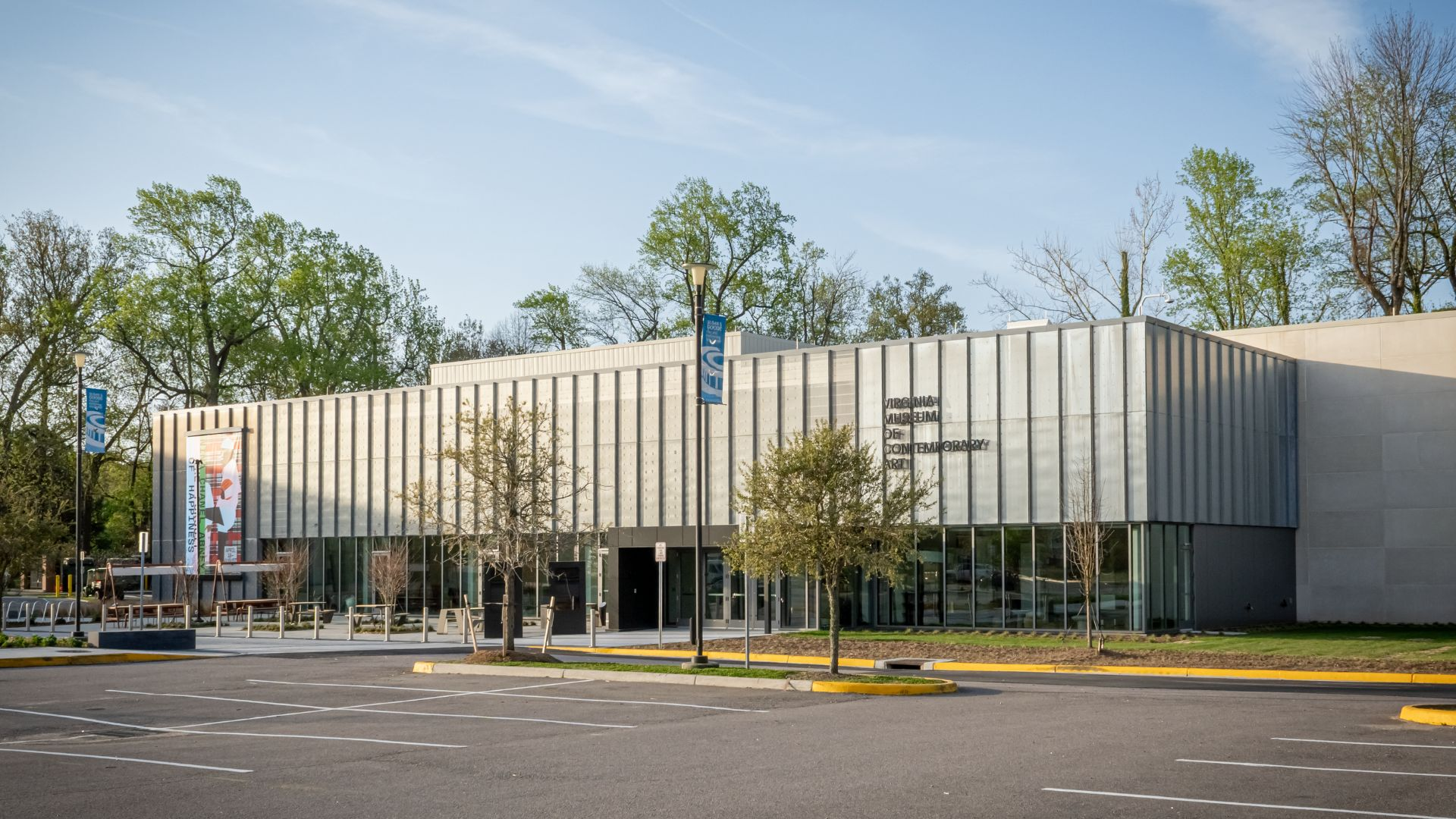
- Exterior of the museum in Virginia Beach
- Established: 1952 (as the Virginia Beach Art Association)
- Location: 5811 Wesleyan Drive, Virginia Beach, Virginia
- Director: Alison Byrne
- Website: www.virginiamoca.org

The Virginia Museum of Contemporary Art (Virginia MOCA) is a contemporary art museum in Virginia Beach, Virginia that presents changing exhibitions rather than maintaining a permanent collection. It organizes the annual Boardwalk Art Show, founded in 1956, an outdoor exhibition whose participating artists are selected by a jury. The museum opened its current building on the Virginia Wesleyan University campus in April 2026; the university was renamed Batten University that July.

The museum developed from the Virginia Beach Art Association, which was formed after a 1952 benefit art sale. During the 1950s, the association broadened its program to include art films, loan exhibitions, members' exhibitions, and craft shows, and began raising money for an arts center. In 1962, it barred black artist A. B. Jackson from the Boardwalk Art Show because of his race; Jackson exhibited the following year and won best in show in 1966. The association merged with the Virginia Beach Museum of Art in 1971, opened a new facility on Parks Avenue in 1989, and became the Virginia Museum of Contemporary Art after receiving museum accreditation in 2010.

Virginia MOCA's exhibition program has included work by artists such as Inka Essenhigh, Maya Lin, Kara Walker, Mark Dion, Alexis Rockman, and Nina Chanel Abney. The museum has produced an exhibition monograph and developed exhibition-related programs with community groups, students, and educators. The museum is governed by an independent board and occupies a building on the Batten University campus.

== History ==
=== Origins and early development ===
The museum originated in a 1952 art sale held to benefit an artist who had become ill. The organizers later formed the Virginia Beach Art Association (VBAA), which held its first outdoor art show on the Virginia Beach boardwalk in 1956. By 1957, the association had more than 100 members and had planned a season of art films, loan exhibitions, a members' exhibition, and a craft exhibition. The association was raising money for an art center by 1958, using proceeds from its annual Artists and Models Ball for a building fund. A proposal announced in 1961 called for a gallery, stage, studios, workshops, and space for films and community organizations.

In 1962, black artist and educator A. B. Jackson was denied entry to the Boardwalk Art Show because of his race. The exclusion drew public criticism in a letter published by The Virginian-Pilot and an editorial in the Ledger-Star. At an unofficial association meeting shortly before the show, members considered whether Jackson and artists of any race could enter future Boardwalk Art Shows, but no vote was held because only 45 of the association's approximately 275 members attended. Jackson exhibited in the show the following year, when his painting Veronica's Veil received an honorable mention. He won the show's best-in-show award in 1966. In 1971, the Virginia Beach Art Association merged with the Virginia Beach Museum of Art. The merged organization opened a new facility at 2200 Parks Avenue in 1989.

=== Development as a contemporary art museum ===
The merged organization adopted the name Contemporary Art Center of Virginia in 1996. In 1999, the center displayed several works by Dale Chihuly, including the chandelier Isola di San Giacomo in Palude, as part of its Art of Glass exhibition. In 2003, a related chandelier was purchased through private donations, retitled Mille Colori, and installed permanently in the Rodriguez Pavilion, which had been built to house it. In December 2010, after an accreditation process lasting nearly four years, the institution received accreditation from the American Alliance of Museums and adopted its current name.

=== Relocation to Virginia Wesleyan University ===
Virginia MOCA announced in July 2023 that it would leave its Parks Avenue site and move to a new building on the campus of Virginia Wesleyan University. Construction of the new museum was funded by a combined $25 million gift from Jane Batten, Joan Brock, and Susan and David Goode.

Museum officials said the Parks Avenue building had been designed as a community art center rather than as a museum and could not accommodate some of the larger works that Virginia MOCA sought to borrow. Groundbreaking for the new facility took place in August 2024. Construction was completed around the beginning of 2026, and a ribbon-cutting ceremony was held on April 8. The museum opened to the public at its new location on April 18, 2026.

== Buildings and facilities ==
=== Parks Avenue building ===
The center opened its Parks Avenue building in 1989 after hiring E. Verner Johnson and Associates to plan and design a new facility near the Virginia Beach Oceanfront. The 38,500-square-foot building contained 6,300 square feet of gallery space, as well as offices, an auditorium, and a central two-story court. Its exterior combined white brick with granite accents and dark-stained wood, and a hip-roofed canopy marked the main entrance.

The column-free galleries used movable wall panels that allowed their size and arrangement to change between exhibitions, while motorized shades controlled the daylight entering through clerestory windows. A copper-roofed walkway led into a 50-foot-high skylit courtyard that provided access to the museum's principal rooms and also served as a gathering and event space. A 12-by-12-foot roll-up door connected the galleries to a receiving area surrounded by storage, workshop, painting, staging, and art-handling rooms.

The center was expanded in 2003 with the Rodriguez Pavilion, which was built to house Dale Chihuly's 14-foot glass chandelier Mille Colori. The addition also included restrooms and other ancillary rooms, renovations to the mechanical systems, and a copper roof and timber-beam canopy.

=== Current museum building ===
The current museum building is a two-story, 35,000-square-foot structure on the Virginia Wesleyan University campus, beside the Susan S. Goode Fine and Performing Arts Center. Tymoff+Moss Architects designed the building, and Hourigan served as the general contractor. It provides approximately 20% more gallery space than the Parks Avenue building. The building has no auditorium or ceramics studio because neighboring university facilities are available to the museum. Virginia MOCA transferred its ceramics equipment to the university's ceramics department.

The entrance opens into a naturally lit atrium with a 20-foot glass curtain wall, a perforated zinc screen, and terrazzo flooring. An expanded ARTlab adjoins the lobby, and a skylit corridor leads from these spaces to a two-gallery core, with Mille Colori and an outdoor sculpture garden at opposite ends.

Movable walls and divisible rooms allow the interior to be reconfigured, while more than 22 miles of cabling support sound, video, and communications systems throughout the building. Behind the public galleries are a secure vault, art-handling rooms, a clean room, mezzanine storage, a loading dock, a catering kitchen, and a security office. The upper floor contains staff offices, two conference rooms, a library, a wellness room, and four 1,000-square-foot studios.

== Governance ==
Virginia MOCA is governed by an independent board of trustees. Plans announced before the move called for Virginia MOCA to remain independent of the Virginia Wesleyan University and lease the new building for $1 a year. The museum had leased its former city-owned site under the same arrangement. The board appointed Alison Byrne as executive director in September 2024 after she had served as interim director since February of that year. The executive director oversees the museum's exhibitions, education programs, operations, finances, external relations, and strategic planning.

== Exhibitions ==
=== Curatorial scope and exhibition practices ===
Virginia MOCA has no permanent collection and presents changing exhibitions. ARTlab, the museum's interactive gallery, offers art-making and interpretive activities related to the exhibitions on view.

=== Selected exhibitions ===
In 2016, Virginia MOCA presented Courtney Mattison: Sea Change, a solo exhibition of ceramic marine works about coral reefs, climate change, ocean acidification, and other threats to marine ecosystems. The exhibition was accompanied by ARTlab activities about oyster beds, developed with Mattison and Lynnhaven River Now. In 2017, Wayne White: MONITORIUM used puppets, props, lighting, and sound to interpret the 1862 Battle of Hampton Roads and the history of the USS Monitor. The Mariners' Museum and the National Oceanic and Atmospheric Administration's Monitor National Marine Sanctuary assisted the project with historical information, data, and sound.

Virginia MOCA organized Inka Essenhigh: A Fine Line in 2018 and produced Essenhigh's first monograph for the exhibition. The exhibition included close to 30 works and was planned for a national tour after its Virginia Beach presentation. Maya Lin: A Study of Water, curated by Melissa Messina, ran at Virginia MOCA from April 21 to September 4, 2022. The exhibition used one large gallery and two smaller galleries to examine water, climate change, and the Chesapeake Bay through Lin's sculpture and environmental projects. One work, Marble Chesapeake & Delaware Bay, used clear glass marbles to trace the bays across the gallery floor and two walls.

In 2023, Virginia MOCA presented Kara Walker: Cut to the Quick, from the Collections of Jordan D. Schnitzer and His Family Foundation. The exhibition included 80 works and carried a content warning. The museum formed a community advisory committee and provided a separate room where visitors could pause after viewing the works. Participating advisory organizations included the Urban League of Hampton Roads, Virginia Center for Inclusive Communities, YWCA of South Hampton Roads, Virginia African American Cultural Center, and Hampton University Museum and Archives.

In 2024, the museum presented Mark Dion and Alexis Rockman: Journey to Nature's Underworld, a traveling exhibition organized by the American Federation of Arts and curated by Suzanne Ramljak. The exhibition included more than 30 sculptures and paintings about people's relationship with nature. In its 2023–24 annual report, Virginia MOCA listed Spencer Tinkham: Witness in the Community Gallery alongside the Dion and Rockman exhibition in the main galleries.

The museum opened its Virginia Wesleyan University building in 2026 with Nina Chanel Abney: The Pursuit of Happiness and Seamless: Art and Design. Abney created the five-panel indoor mural installation Held for the exhibition. Seamless featured 15 artists who also worked as designers, including Shepard Fairey.

== Boardwalk Art Show ==
The Virginia Beach Art Association established the Boardwalk Art Show in 1956 as an outdoor exhibition along the Virginia Beach Oceanfront. By 1962, the show occupied the boardwalk between 8th and 14th streets and had 214 registered exhibitors. The 1963 show presented awards in oils, watercolors, graphics, sculpture, ceramics, and pastels, and had recorded more than $12,000 in sales by Sunday, one day before it closed.

The event is a juried outdoor exhibition of fine art and contemporary craft by artists from across the United States. The 2025 edition included 175 artists, and the museum identified the 2026 event as the show's 70th annual presentation.

== Education and public programs ==
Virginia MOCA's school outreach program is designed for students in grades three through five and is available to schools, institutions, and community groups in the Hampton Roads region. Sessions combine guided examination of contemporary art with art-making activities and are led by museum educators. The museum also provides in-person and virtual group tours for different age levels, with optional art-making workshops for groups visiting the museum.

The museum holds exhibition-based workshops for educators and develops training with individual schools. The museum has also run the Teen Apprenticeship Program and published classroom resources. ARTlab offers activities for visitors of different ages.

After the museum closed during the COVID-19 pandemic in March 2020, it created VirtualVAMOCA.org, moved public programs online, and produced exhibition videos, home art projects, and virtual exhibitions. It also introduced virtual gallery tours and worked with WHRO's VA TV Classroom to produce short programs about artworks and related art activities. During the 2023–24 fiscal year, 7,667 children and adults took part in the museum's classes, tours, events, and public programs.

== Reception and regional role ==
A 2023 review in Panorama praised Maya Lin: A Study of Water for linking global environmental issues with the ecology of the Chesapeake Bay, but criticized the exhibition's QR-code audio program because visitors were not advised to bring headphones and no alternative listening method was provided. In 2024, museum leaders said many local residents knew Virginia MOCA mainly through the Boardwalk Art Show and still associated it with its earlier identity as a community arts center. Museum and university officials said the new location would raise the museum's profile. They estimated that about 1.8 million people lived within a 30-minute drive of the site.
