= A. B. Jackson =

A. B. Jackson may refer to:

- A. B. Jackson (poet) (born 1965), Scottish poet
- A. B. Jackson (painter) (1925–1981), African-American painter
- Brian Jackson (cricketer) (A. B. Jackson, 1933–2024), English cricketer

== See also ==
- Jackson (surname)
