= Josef Jackerson =

Russian painter

- Иосиф Якерсон
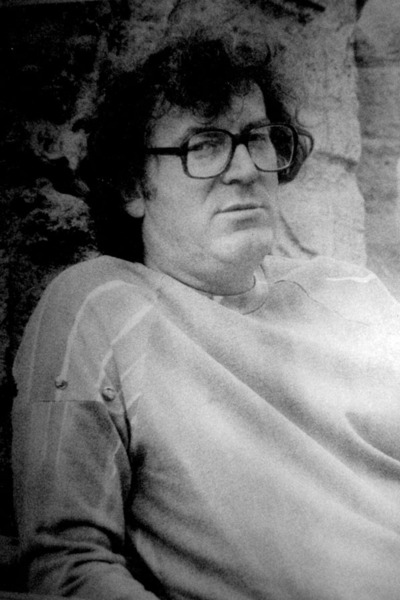
- Born: 2 June 1936 (age 90); Leningrad, USSR
- Known for: Painting
- Website: https://jackersonart.myvisual.org/en/main/

Josef Jackerson (Russian: Иосиф Якерсон; born June 2, 1936, Leningrad) is a Russian and Israeli painter, draughtsman and scene painter currently residing in Israel.

== Biography ==
He began his art studies at the School for Young Talents, and then proceeded to study at the Leningrad Academy of Fine Arts. Prior to his graduation from the Academy in 1960, his work was exhibited at international student exhibitions in France (1947), Germany (1958), and the 6th World Festival of Youth and Students in Moscow (1956). In subsequent years, up until his emigration from the Soviet Union in 1973, his works were included in several city, regional and national exhibitions.

Jackerson immigrated to Israel in 1973, and thereafter his works were displayed at various exhibitions in Israel, the United States, Russia, Switzerland, and Australia.

== Personal exhibitions ==
Noteworthy personal exhibitions include the following:

- The Jerusalem Theatre (1974)
- The Herzliya Museum (1977)
- Ramat Gan Museum (1977)
- The Nora Gallery (Jerusalem, 1977)
- The International Christian Information Center (Jerusalem, 1980, 1894)
- Eduard Nakhamkin Fine Arts Gallery (New York, 1986, 1988)
- The Three Painters Forum (Fine Arts Gallery, New York, 1986),
- The Israeli R. Ettinger Award ceremony in Van Leer Institute (Jerusalem, 1987)
- The Marble Palace (Russia, St. Petersburg, 1992)
- Habima Theater for the production of Babel’s Sunset (Tel Aviv, 1986)
Oil painting

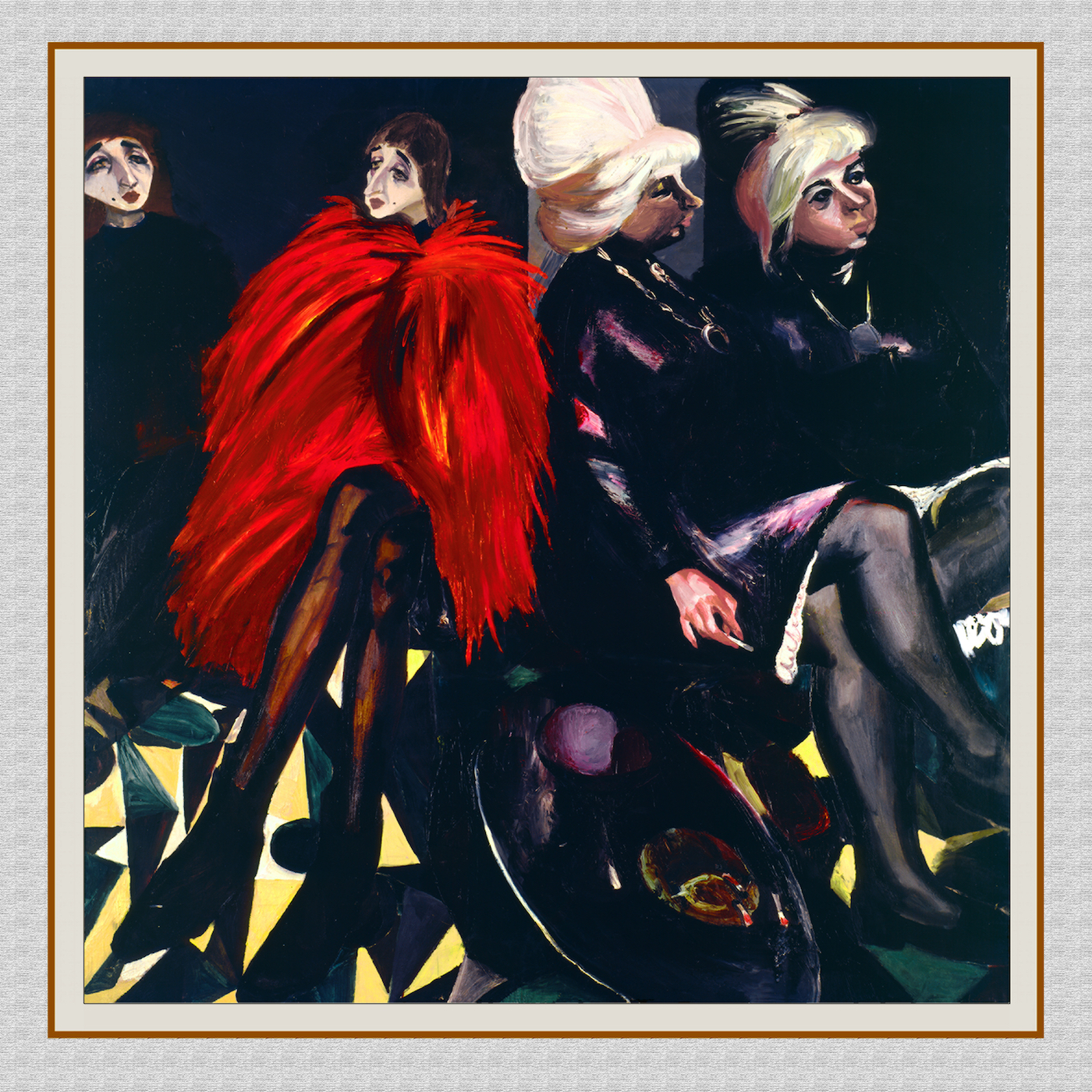
Meeting cafe. 1964.

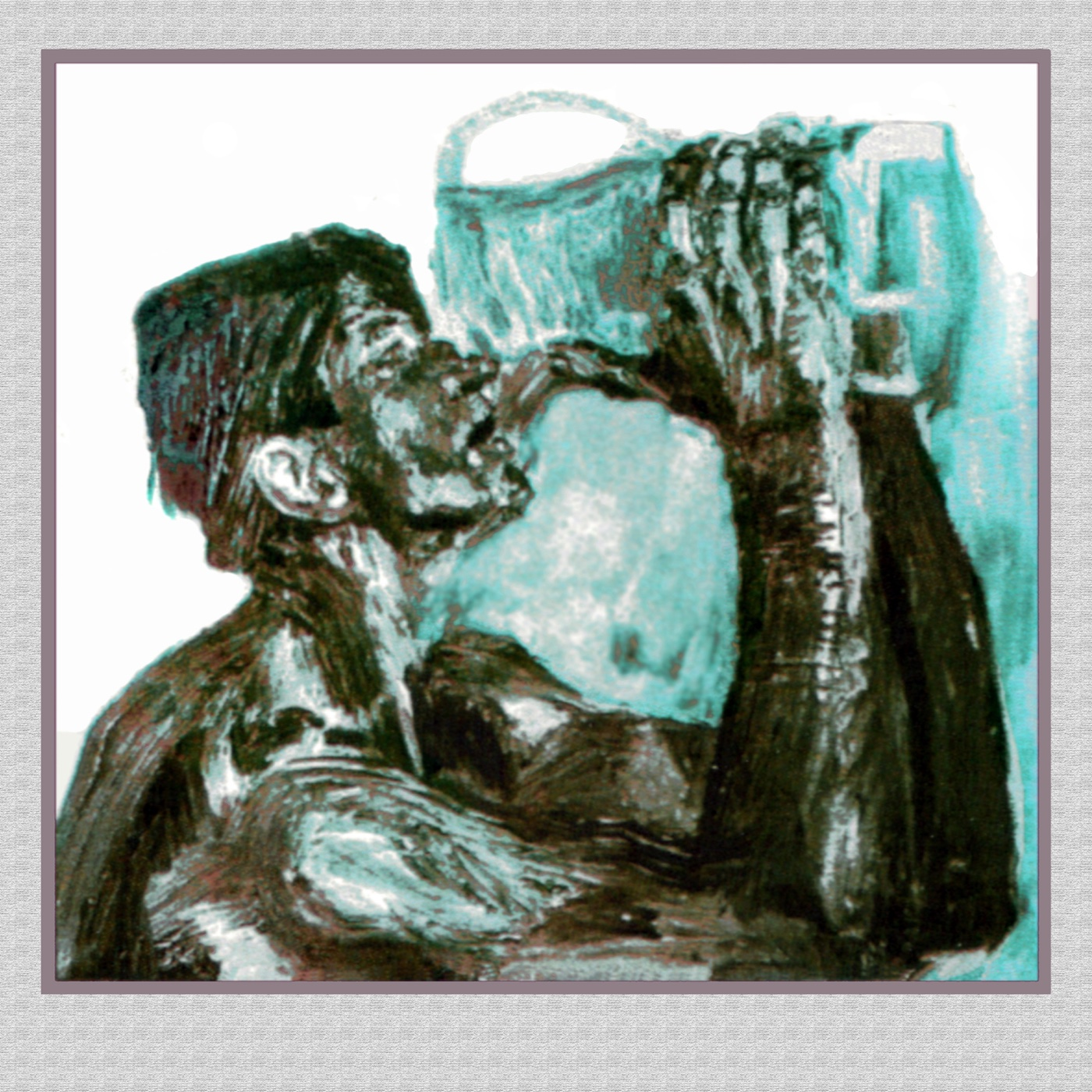
Drinking glassblower. 1964.

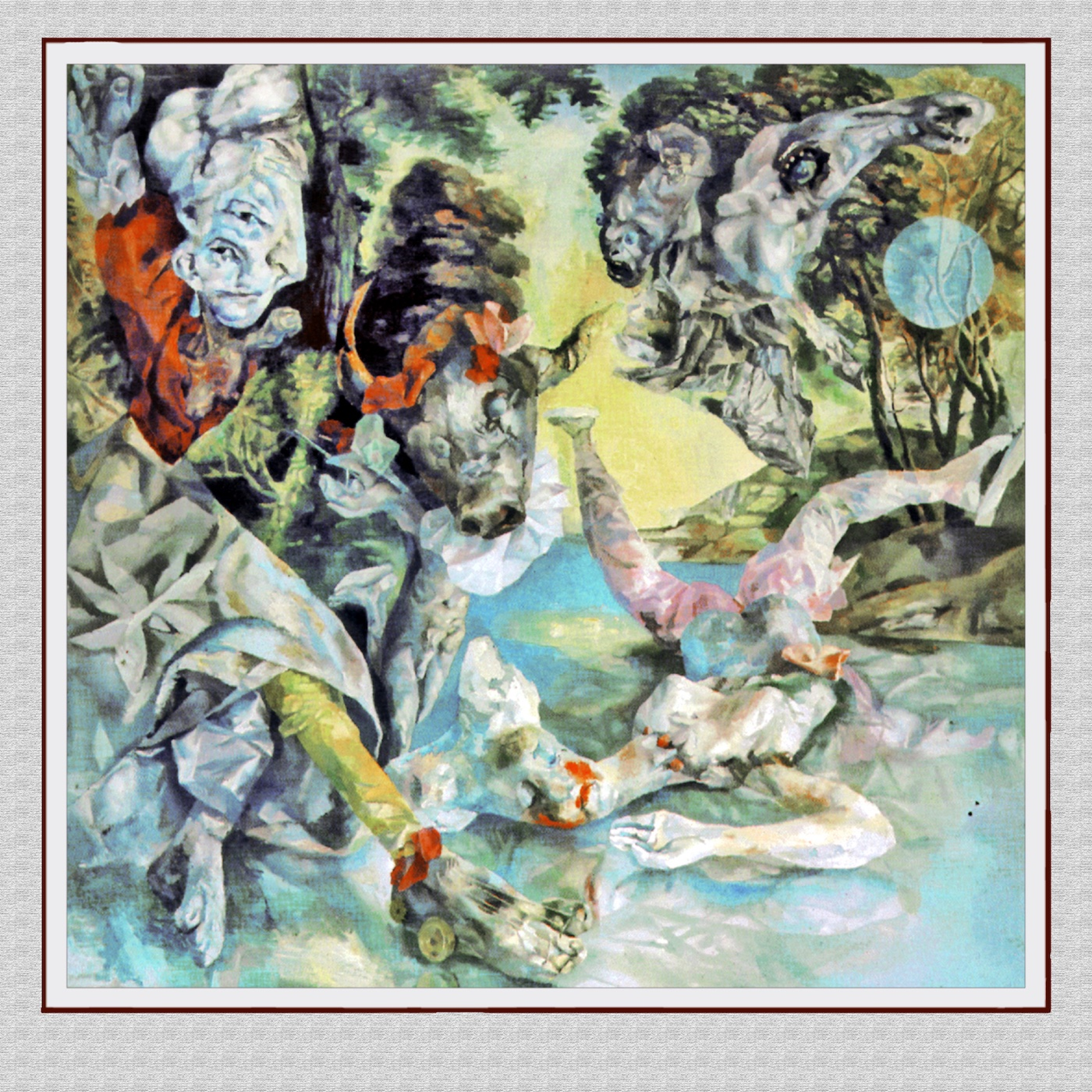
Summer ice rink. 1976.

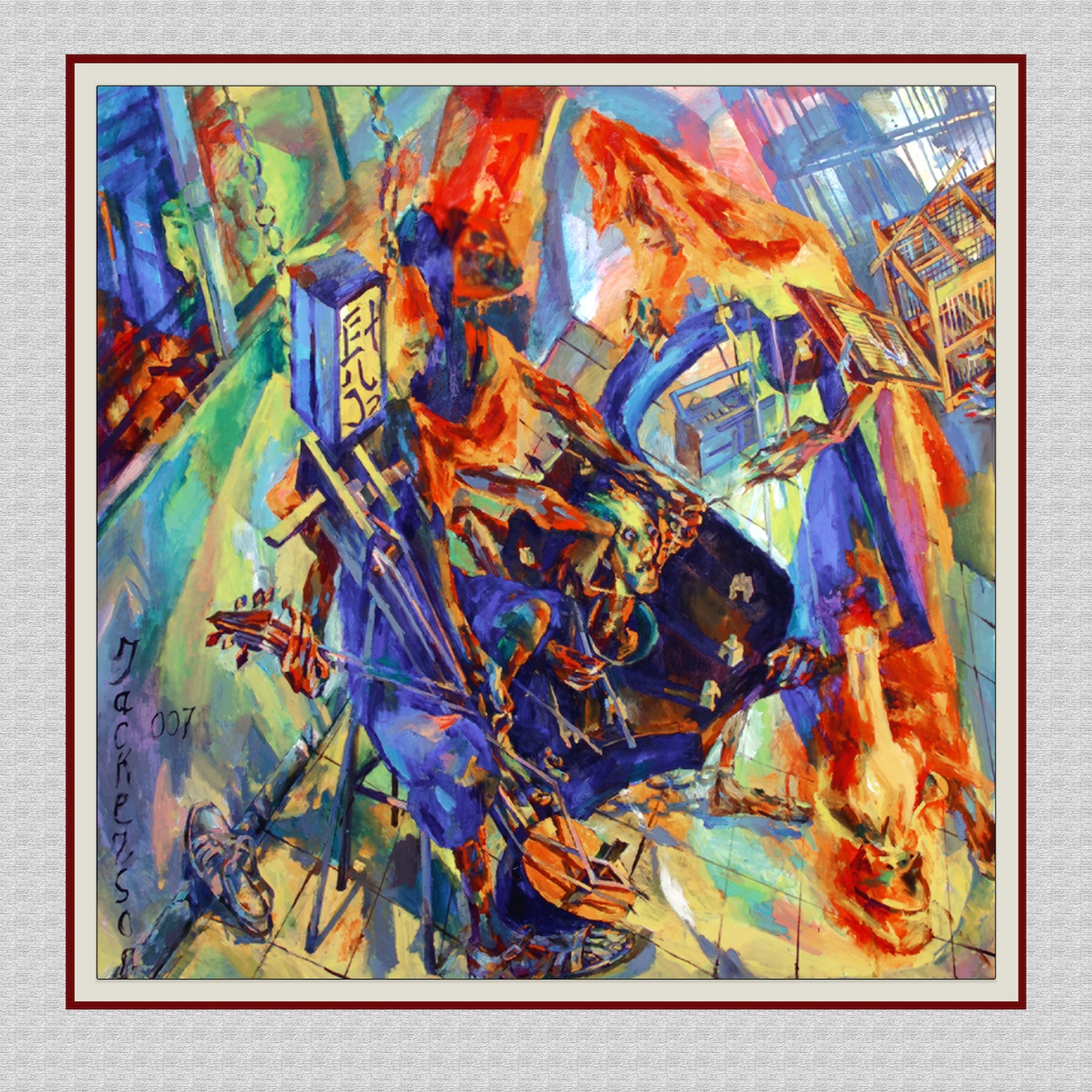
Ancient musical instruments (Japan). 2007.

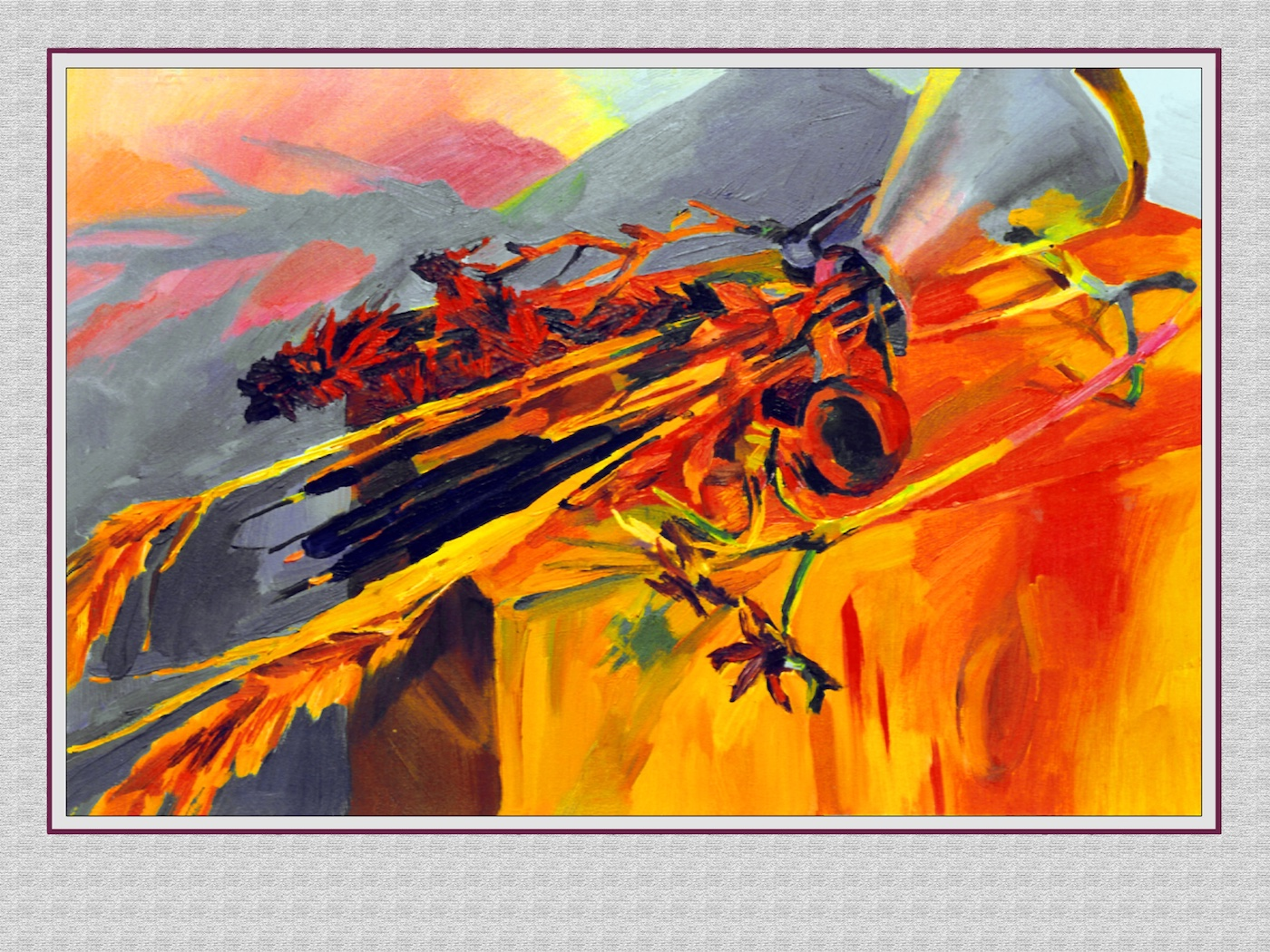
Flowers. 1994.

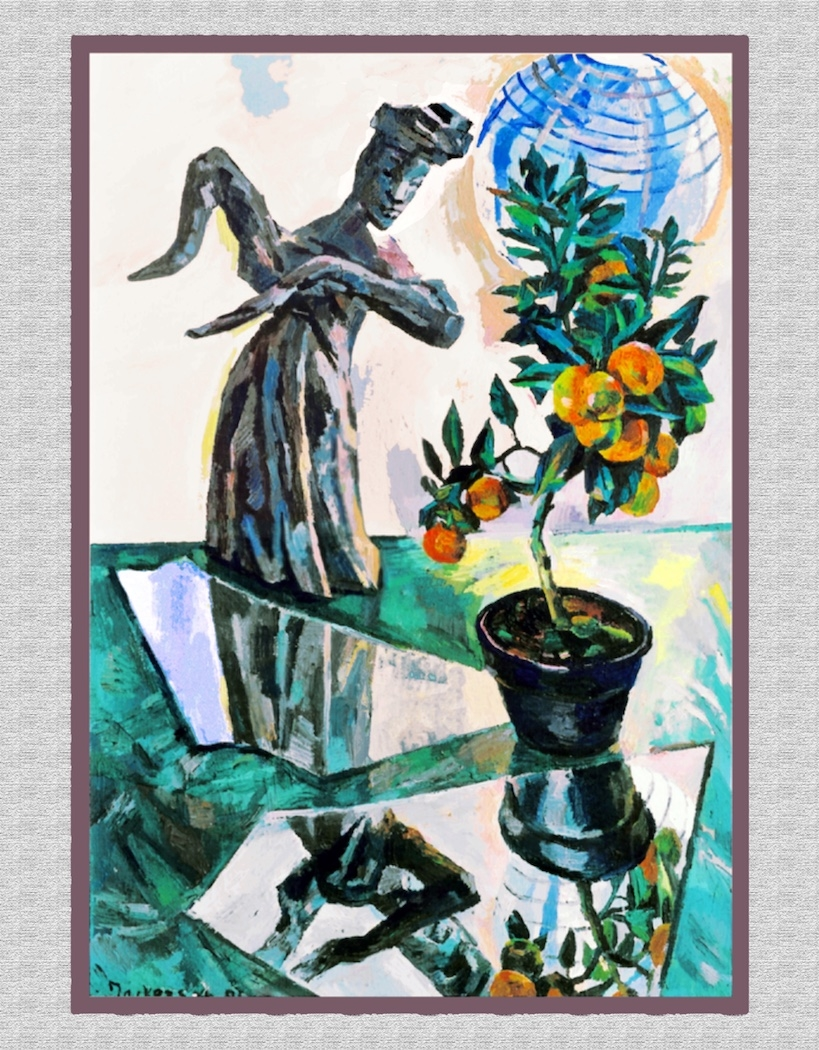
Orange tree. 1991.

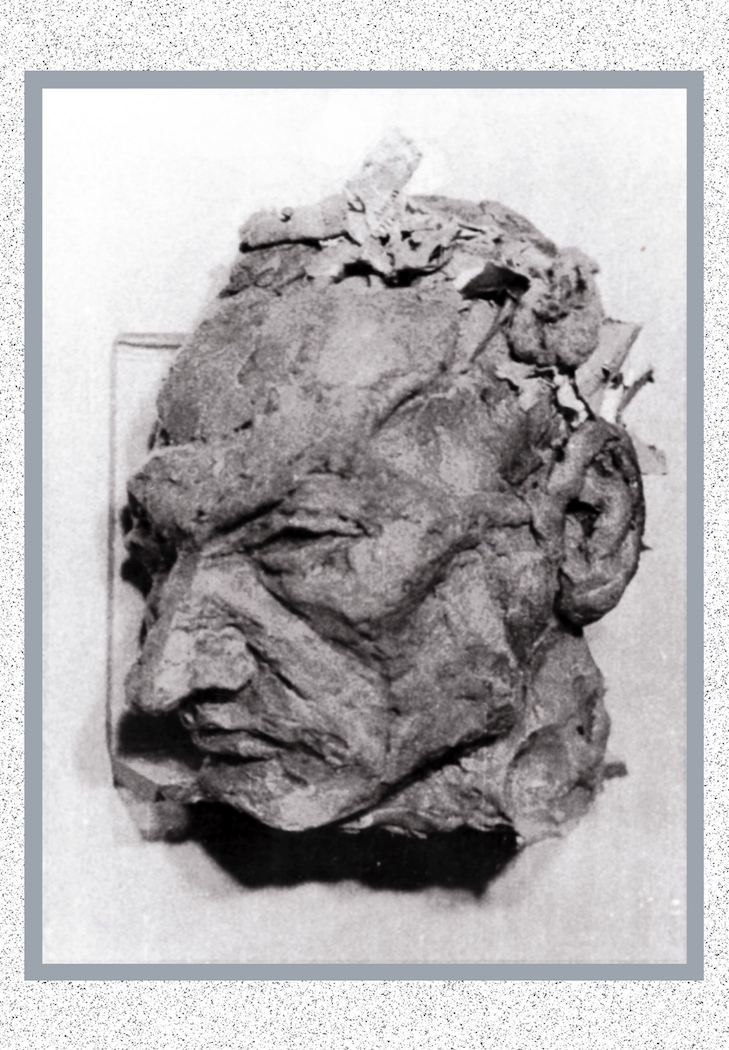
Sculptural portrait of Valery Panov

== Theatrical works ==
Jackerson has also been involved in the performing arts by designing the production and sets for various opera, ballet and stage productions in Europe and Israel, such as:

- Opera "Nabucco" by Giuseppe Verdi at the Bonn Opera in Germany, directed by Yuri Lyubimov.
- Ballet “Don Quixote” by L. Minkus at the Slovenian National Opera and Ballet Theater. Choreographer Valery Panov
- Joint production of the Habima Theater and the Beersheba Theater of Bertolt Brecht’s “Good Person of Szechwan”, directed by Yuri Lyubimov
- “Sunset” by Isaac Babel at the Habima Theater, directed by Yuri Lyubimov
Theatrical works

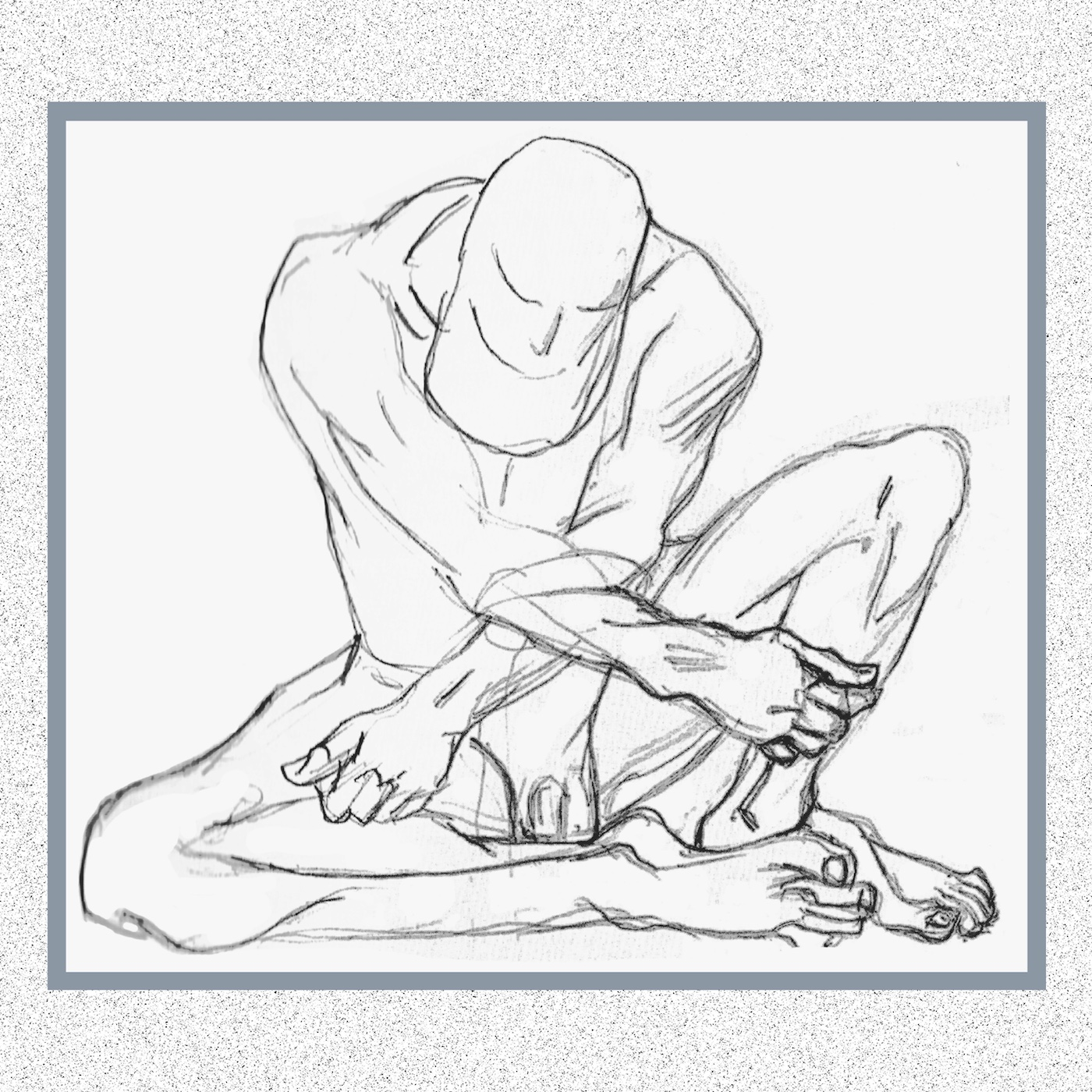
Nabucco

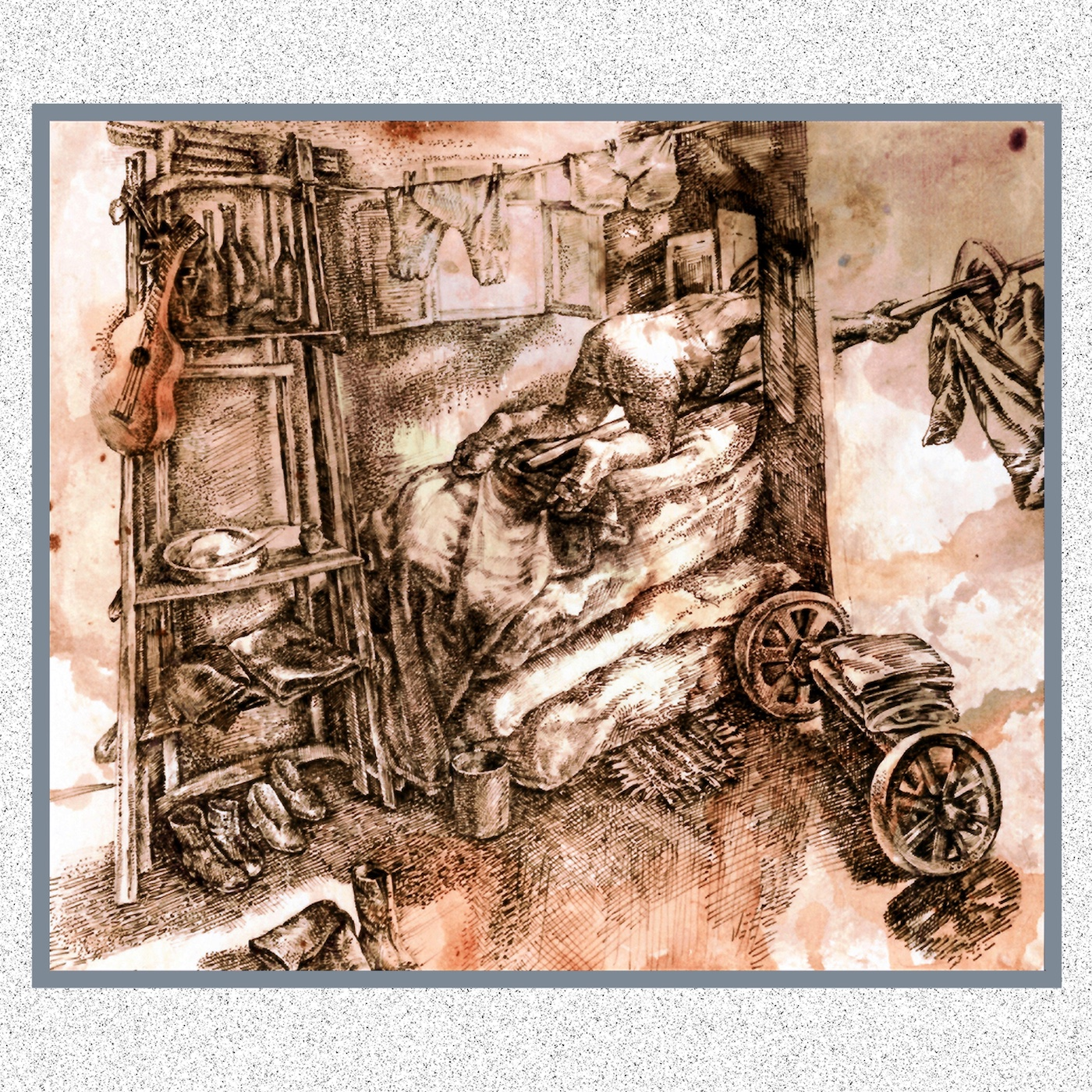
Sunset

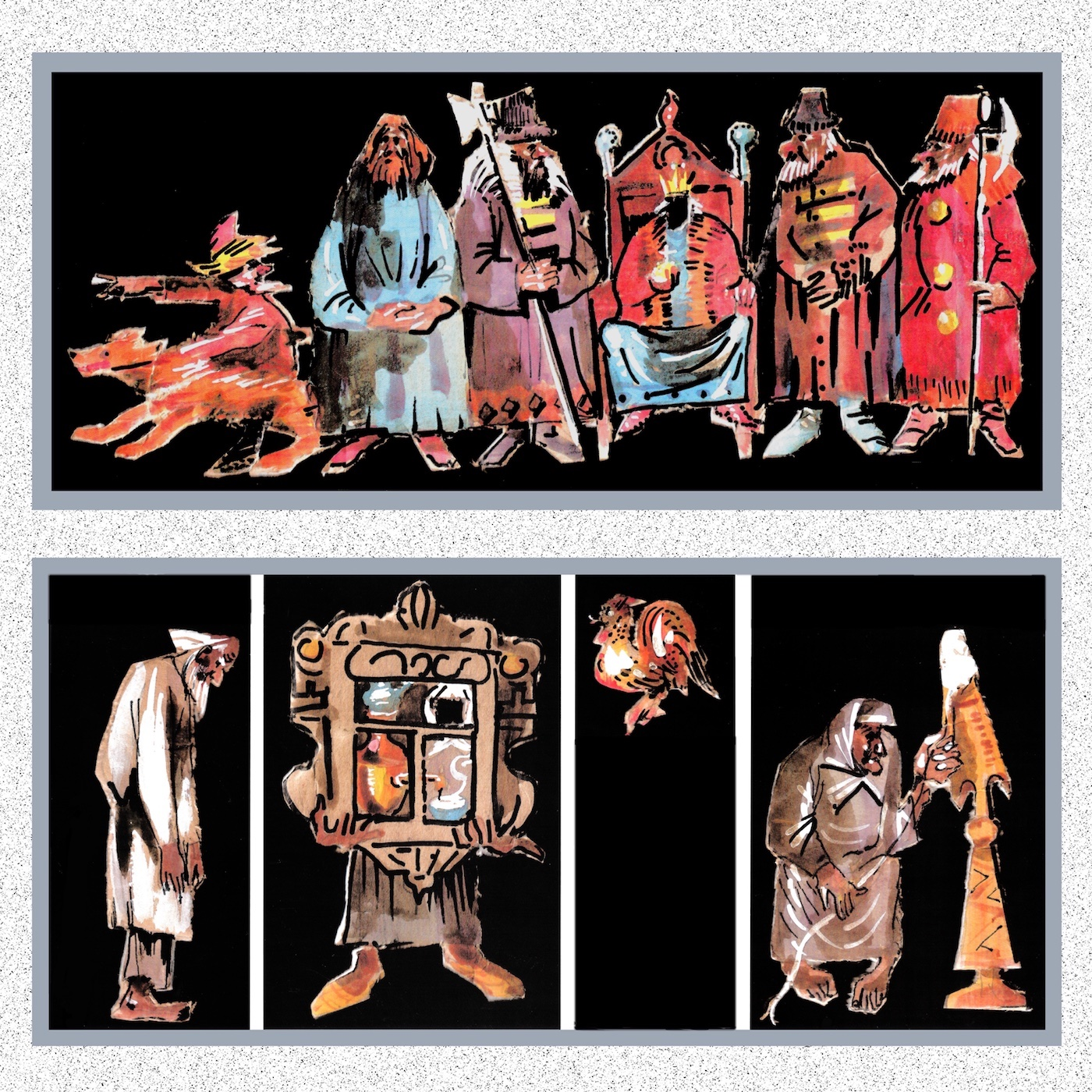
Pushkin's Tales

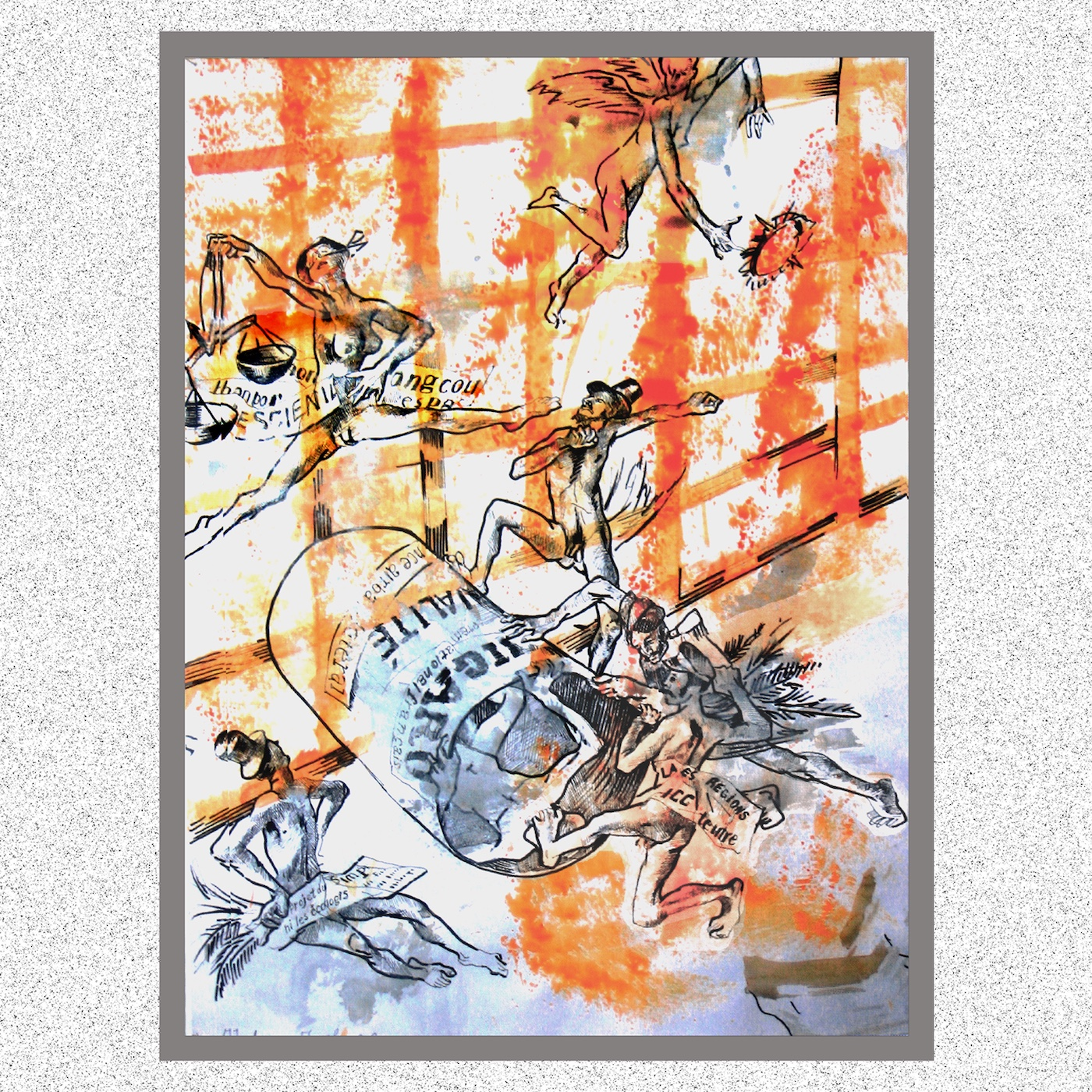
The Dreyfus affair

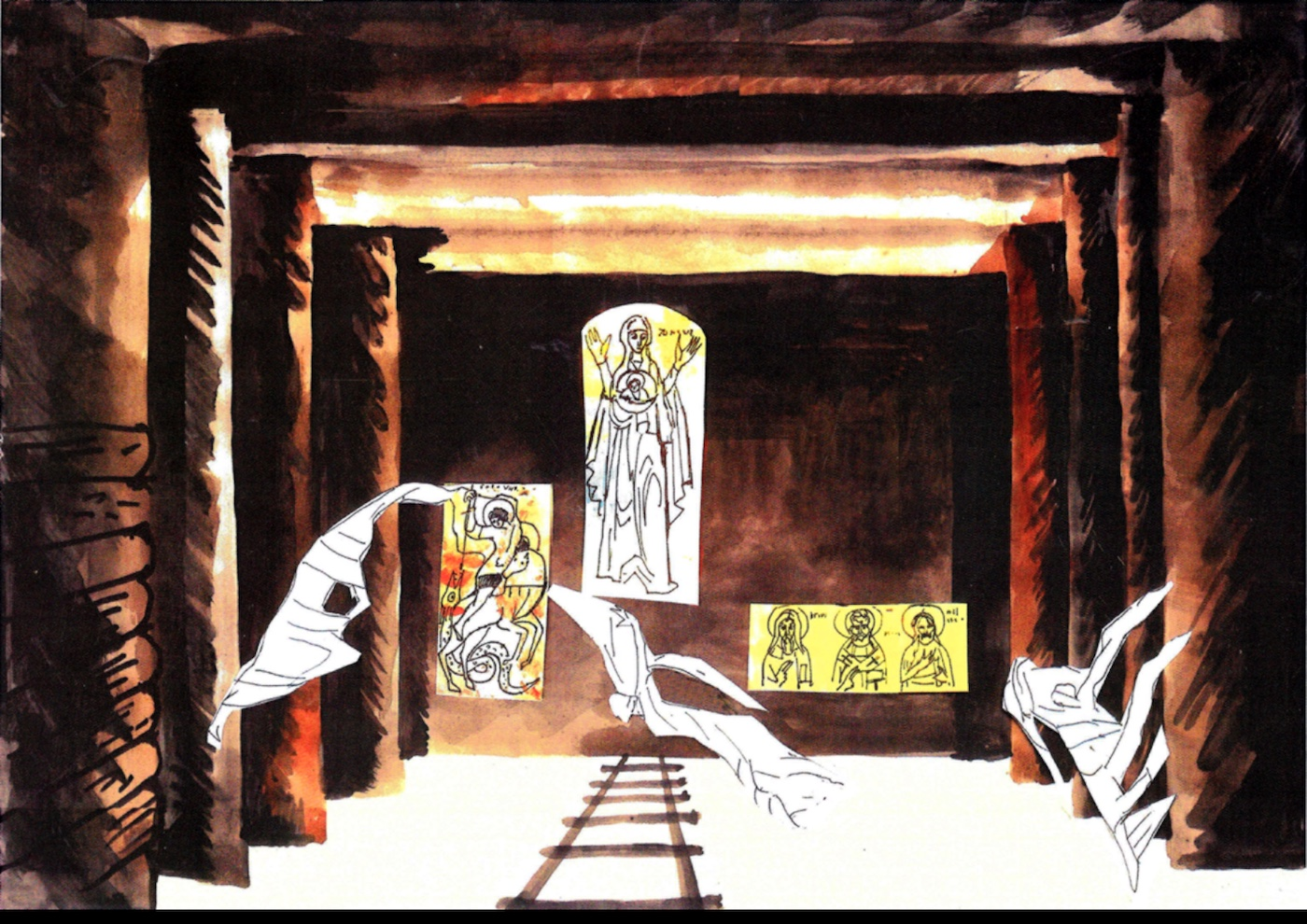
Doctor Zhivago

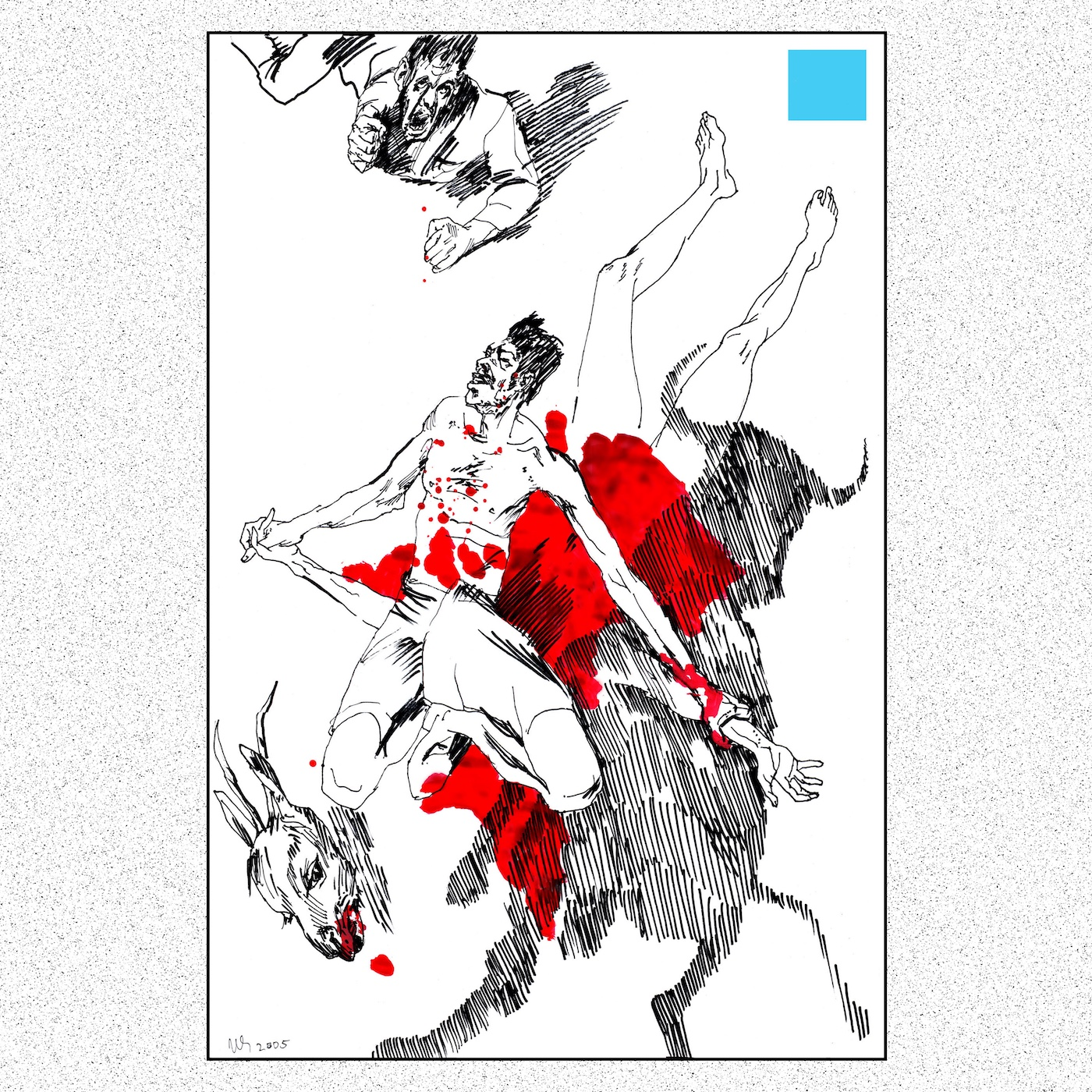
Carmen Suite

== Museums, galleries and private collections ==
Jackerson‘s works have been included in a number of museum and private collections, including:

- Vatican Museum of Modern Art
- Yad Vashem Museum
- Herzliya Museum
- Collection of the Christian Information Center in Israel
- Novgorod Museum
- Military Historical Museum of Artillery, Engineers and Signal Corps
- Kirishi Museum, Leningrad region
- Private collection of Her Majesty the Queen of the Netherlands
- Private collection of D. Bosky in London
- Private collection of Eduard Nakhamkin in Miami, Florida
- Vassar College Museum (New York)
- Collection of the Norton Dodge, currently at the Zimmerli Art Museum at Rutgers University, New Brunswick (NJ)
- Private collection of Nathan Berman (Metro Loft NYC)

== Teaching ==
Josef Jackerson taught painting and drawing at the University of Haifa, the Beersheba College of Art and the School of Art. Throughout his career in Israel he taught privately in his studios. Some of his students have proceeded to professional careers in the arts. For educational purposes, he created many unique sculptures.

Tutorials

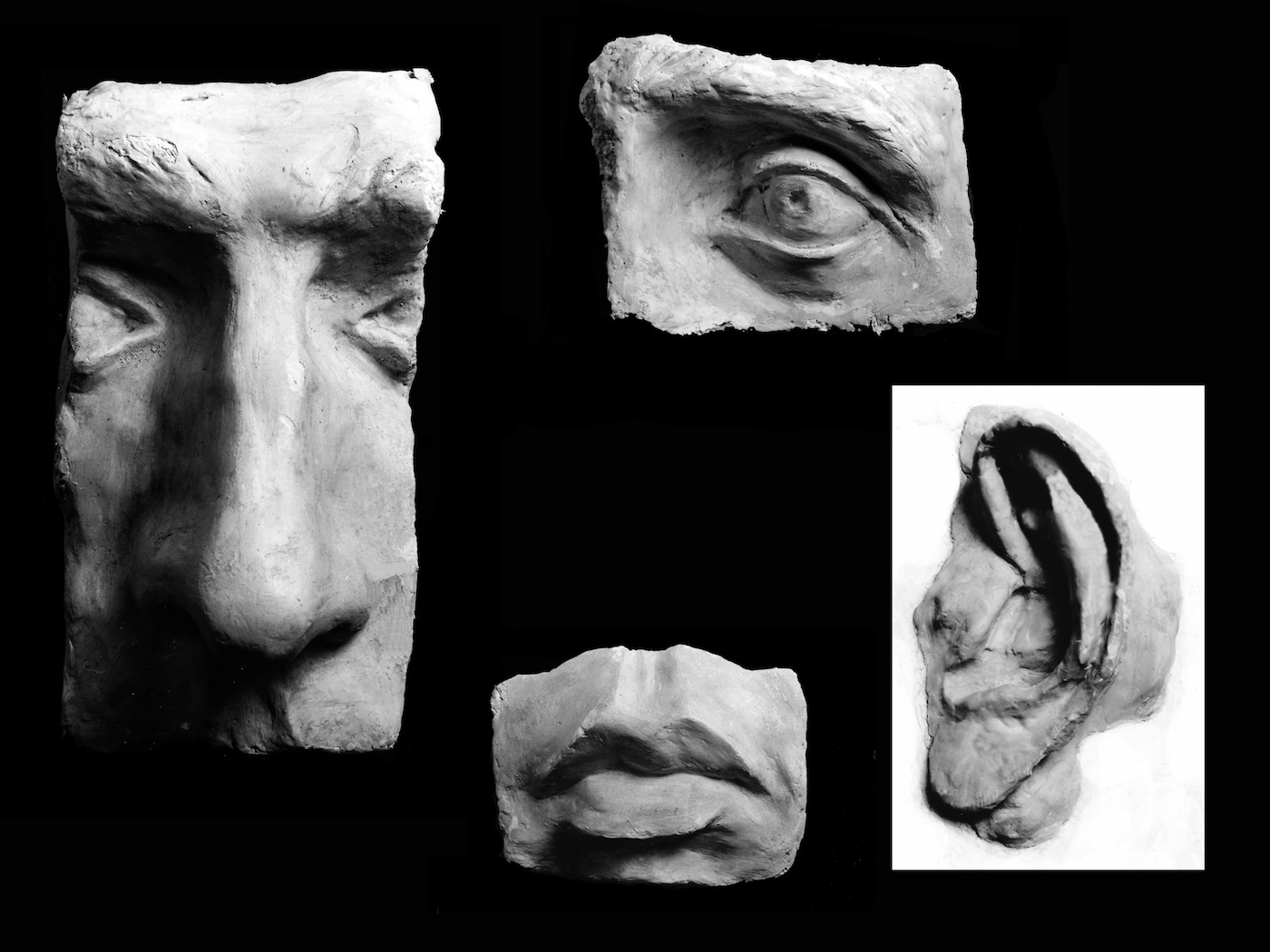
Parts of the face

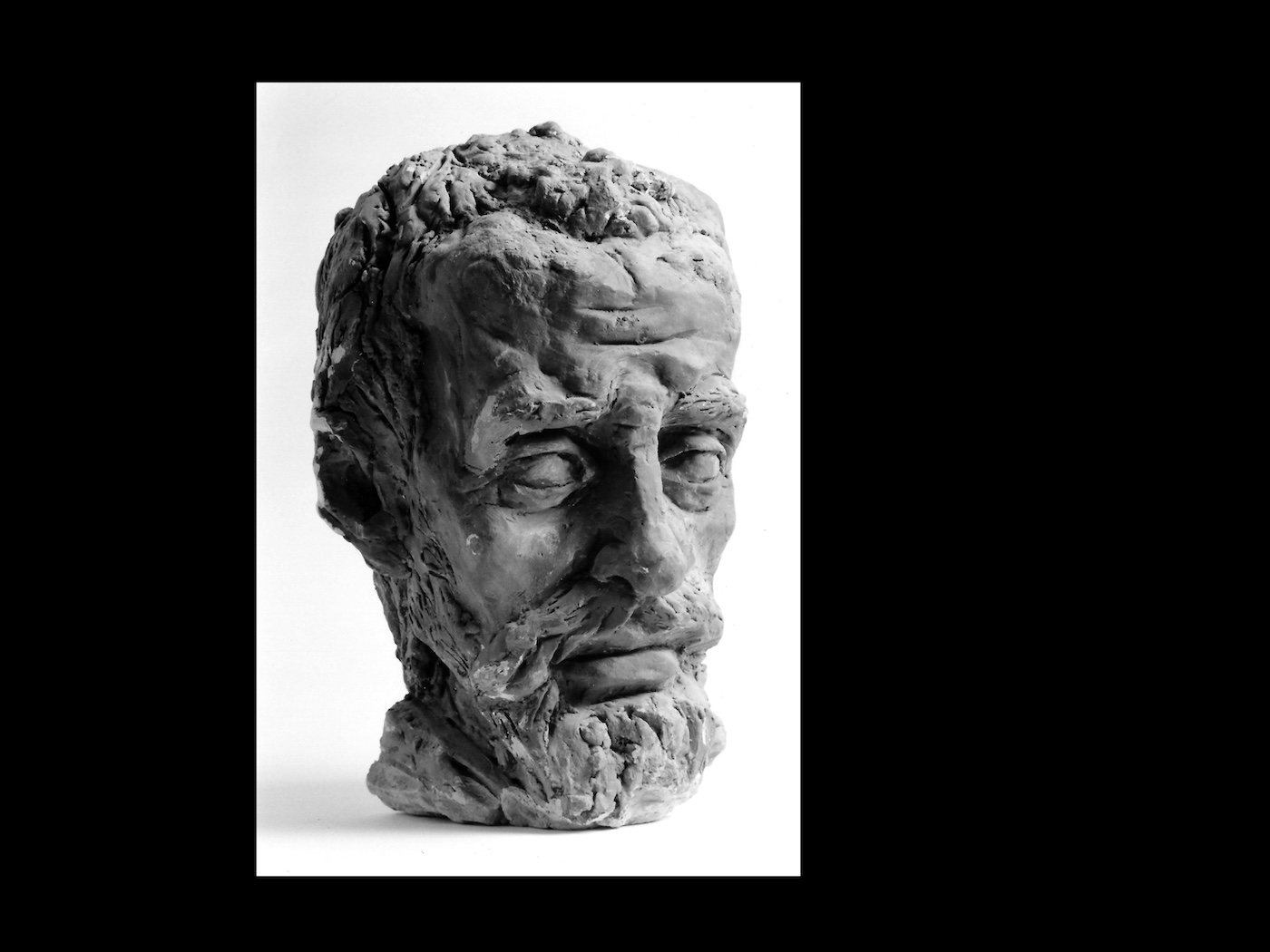
Replica of the head from the sculpture by Donatello

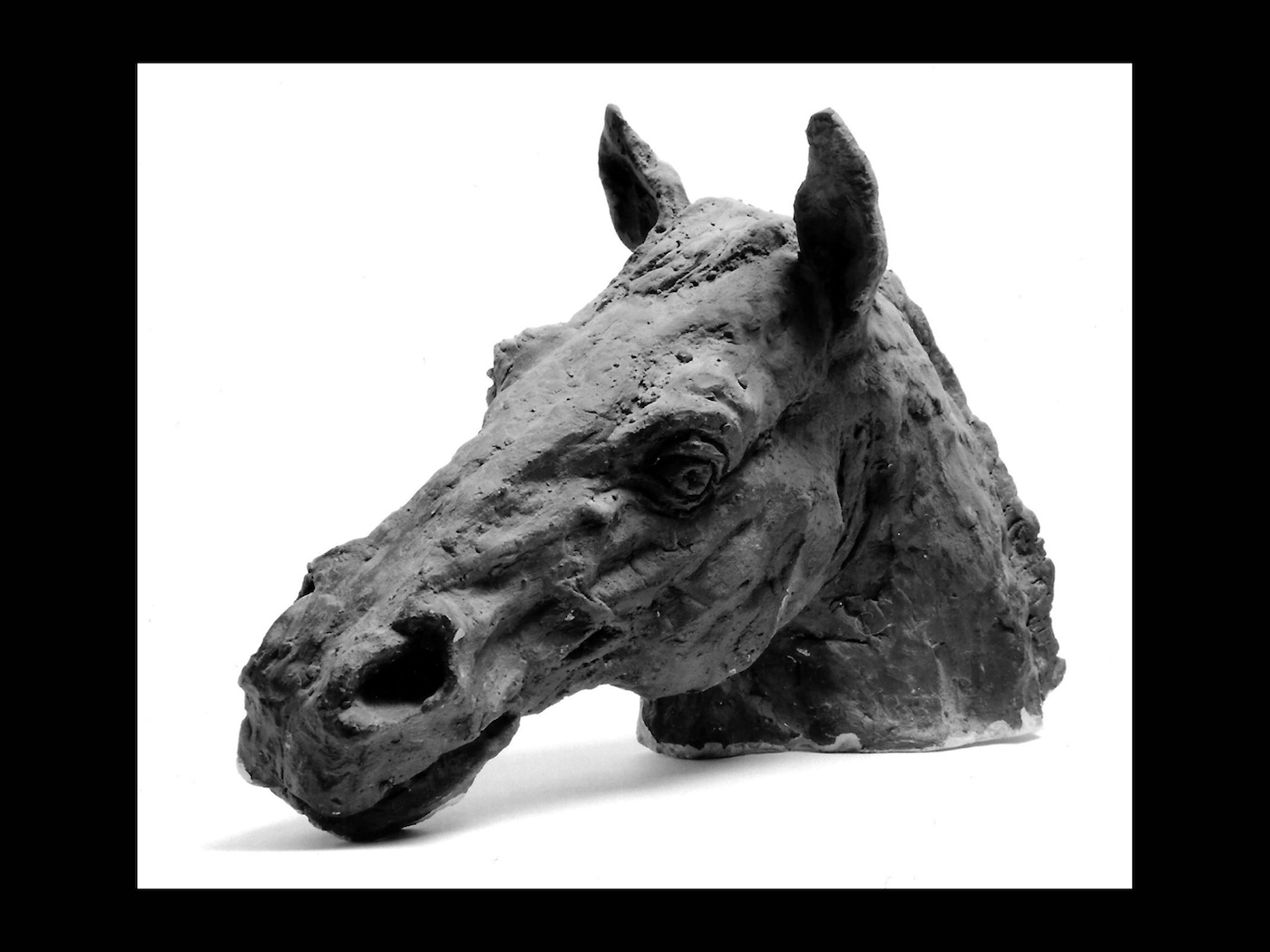
Horse's head

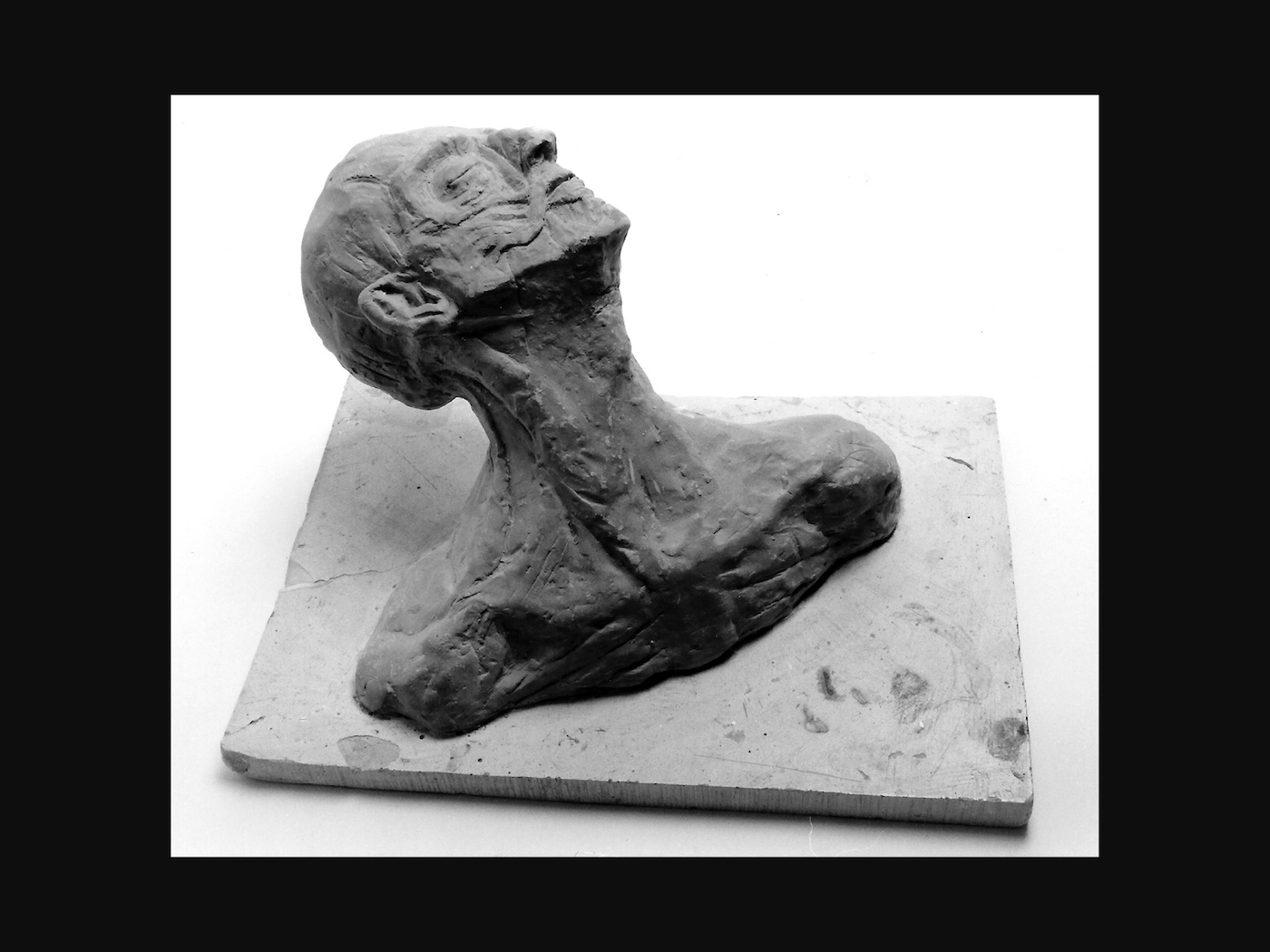
Anatomical sculptures (Écorché)

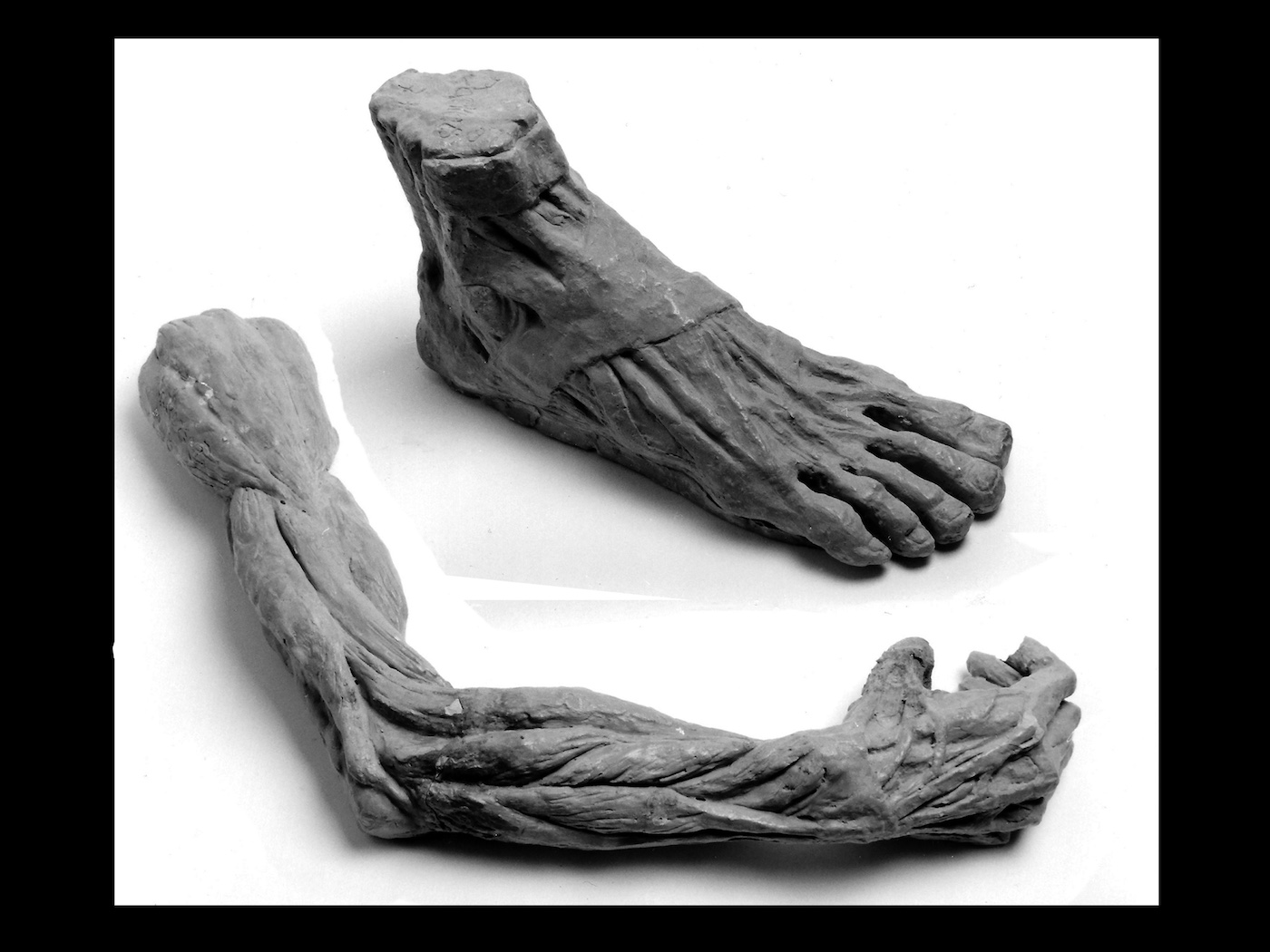
Anatomical sculptures (Écorché)

== Publications ==
- In 1979 Jackerson wrote an article Artist on Art that was published in The 22 Magazine (issues 7 and 8). Discussing extensive art historical material, Jackerson formulated his own vision of the cyclic nature of art history. The paper analyzed the relationship between art and artists as well as the artist and society at various stages of history.
- article “The Lord lives! Let's start! " – this is Jackerson's speech during the Israeli Rose Ettinger Award ceremony for cultural workers – immigrants from the USSR in Israel. First published in The 22 Magazine, No.64, March–April 1989

== Catalogs and selected works ==
- The magazine "ART of RUSSIA and the WEST", No.1, March 1989. Author Mihail Chemiakin
- Josef Jackerson. Eduard Nakhamkin Fine Arts, New York, NY
- Jackerson Josef. Selected Works of Art. 2003 (ISBN 965-555-124-5)
- Jackerson Josef. Selected Works of Art. Selected Drawings, Moсkups and Study Aids. 2003 (ISBN 965-90532-0-7)
- Jackerson Josef. Selected Works of Art. Still Lifes, Drawings and Other Works. 2005 (ISBN 965-90532-1-5)
Drawings

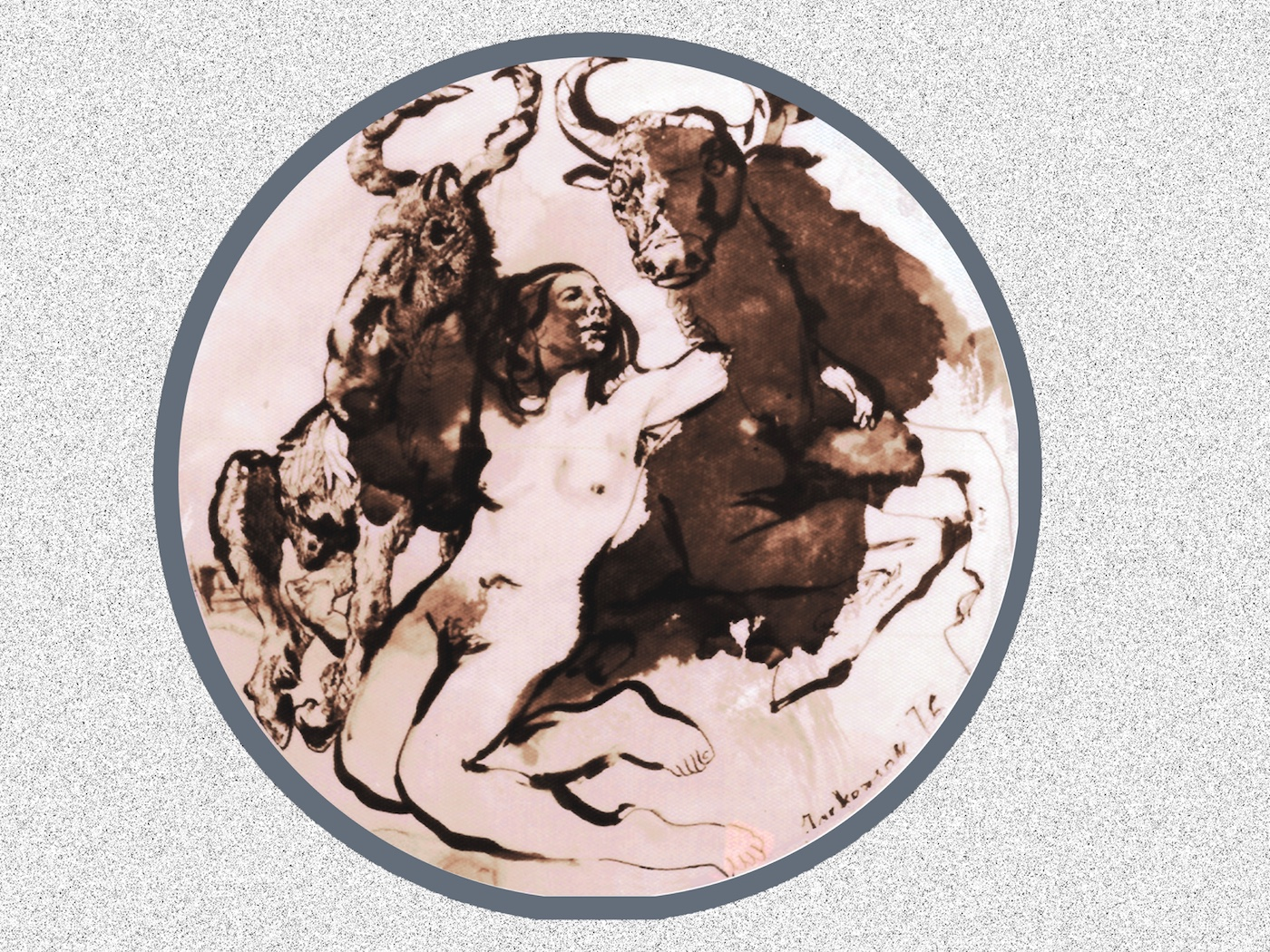

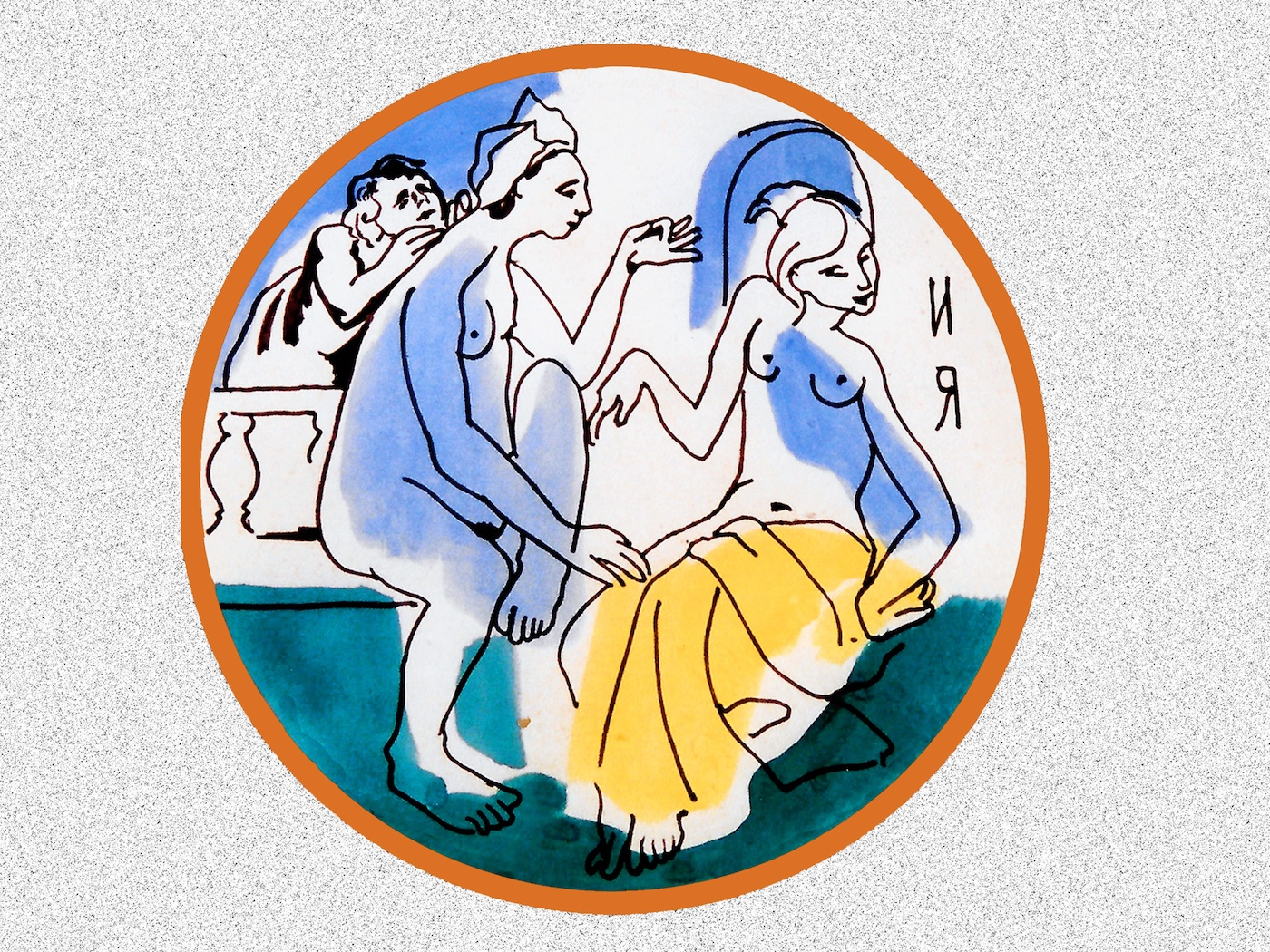

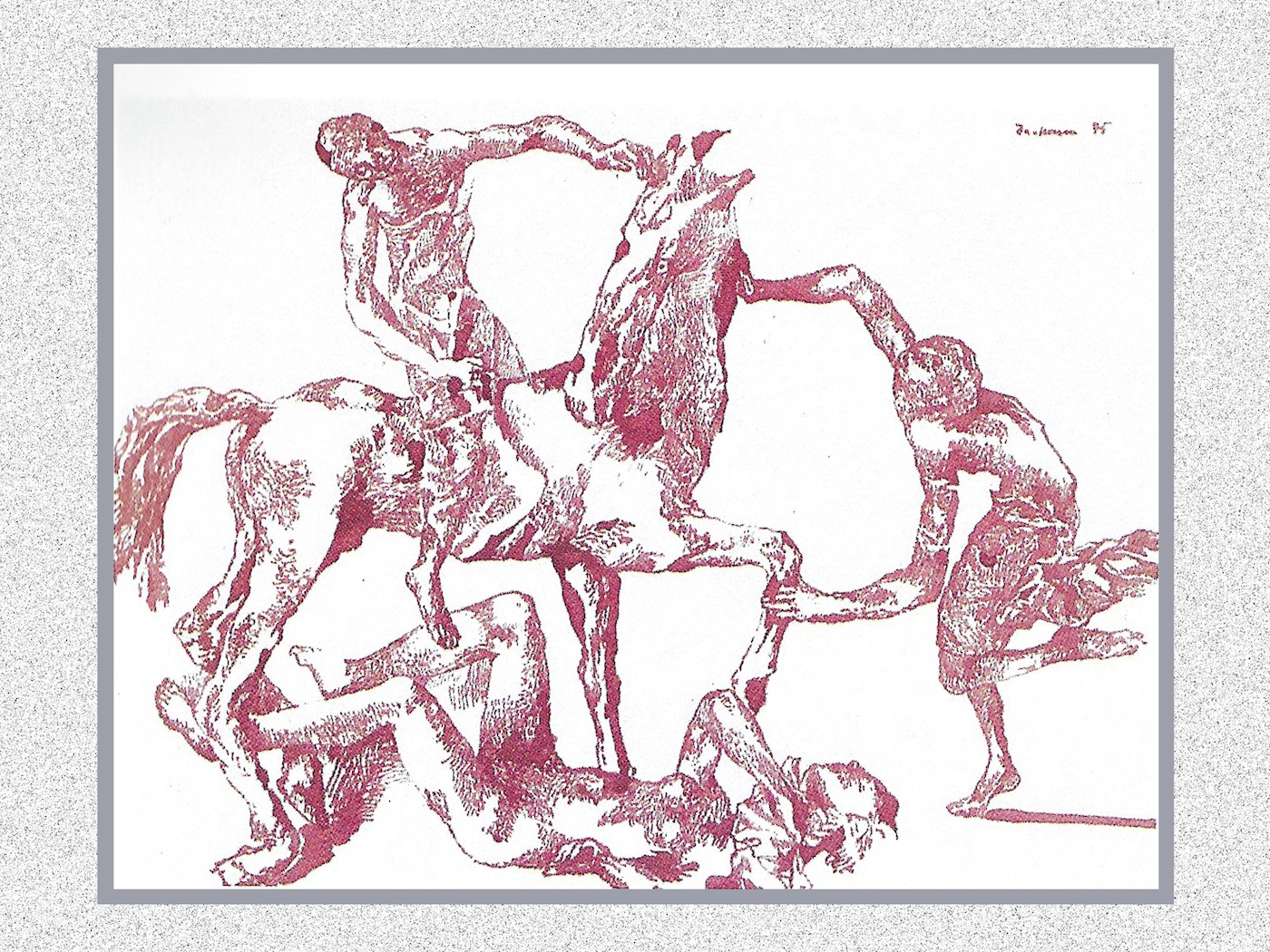

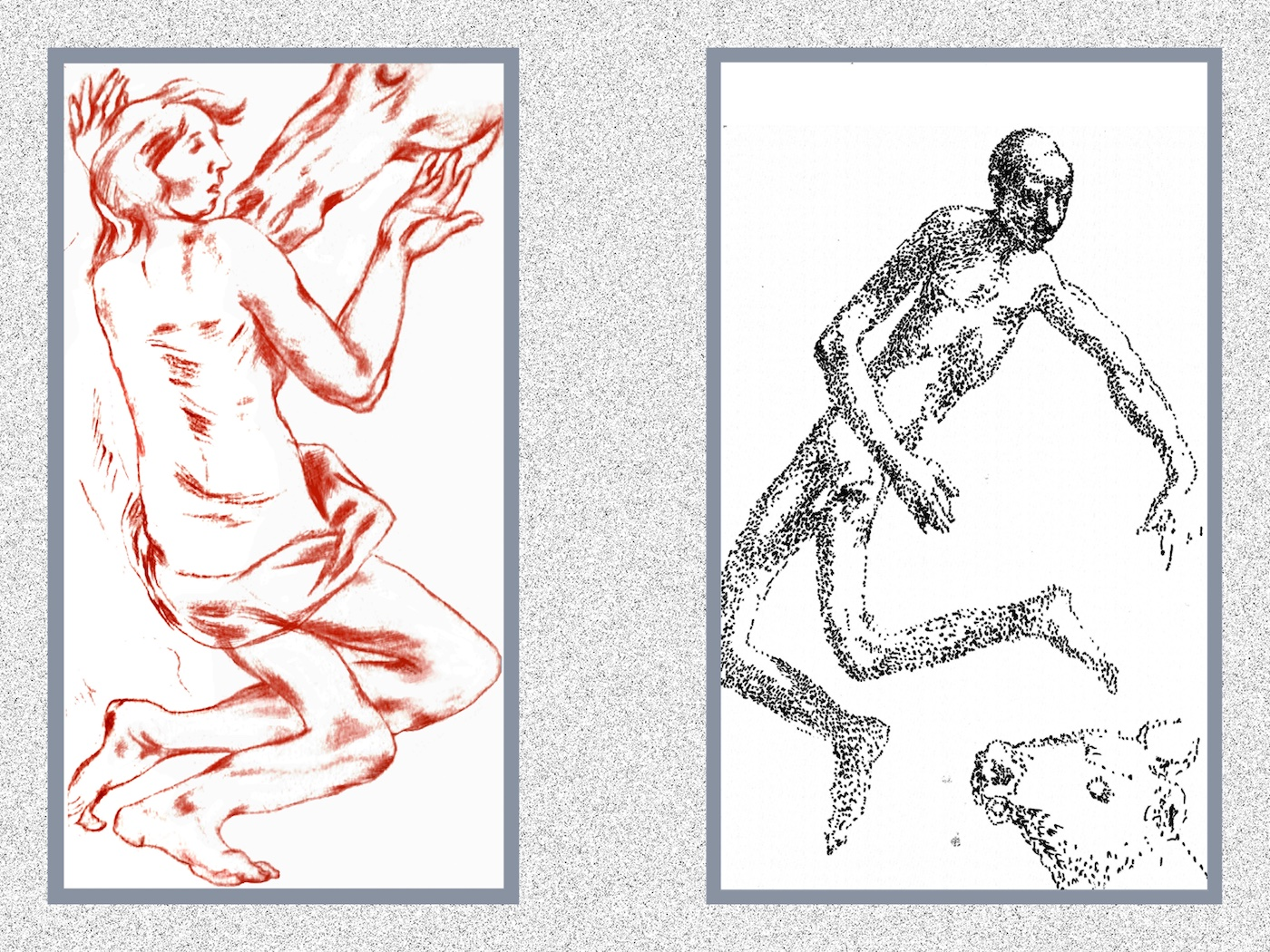

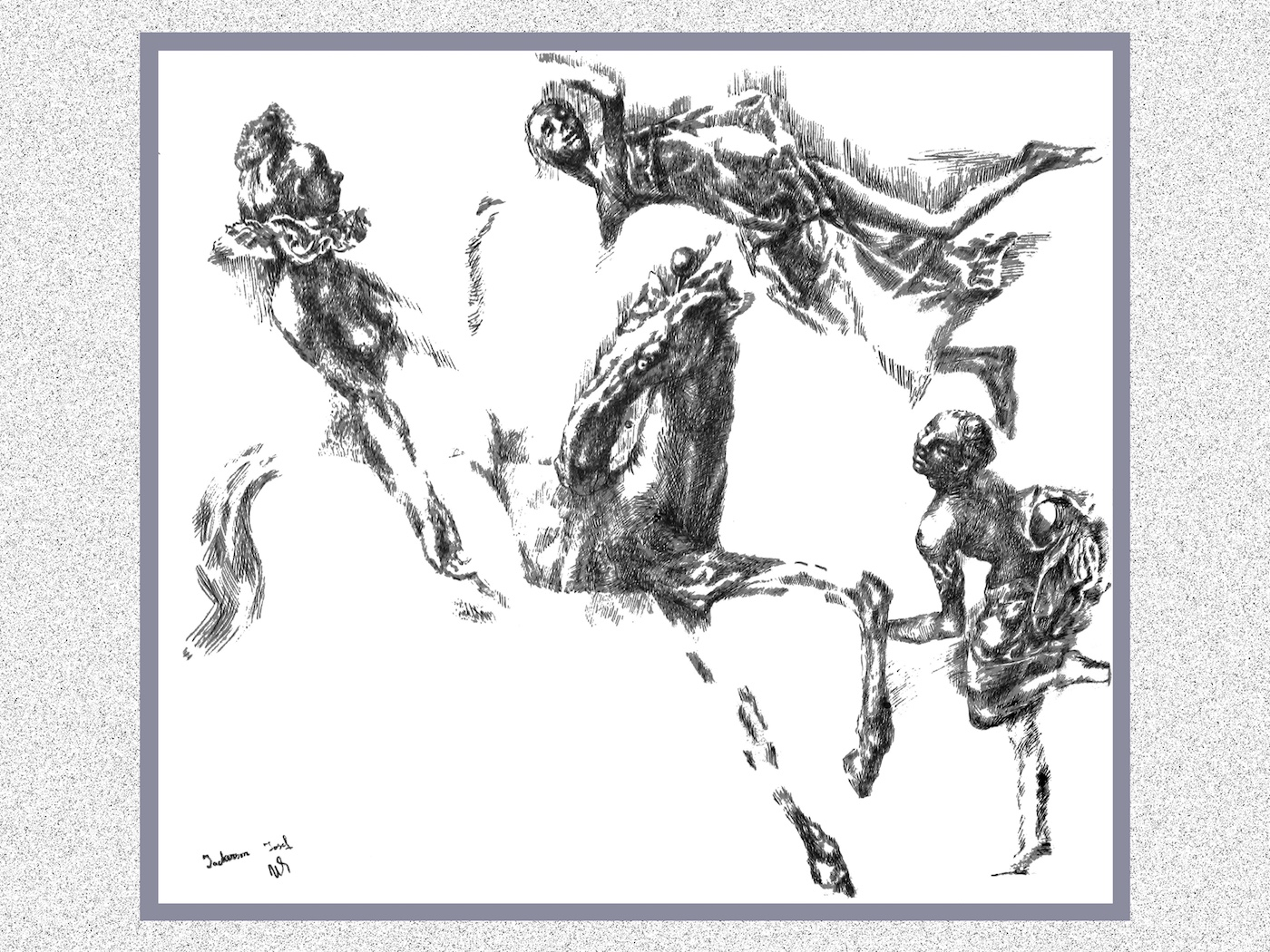

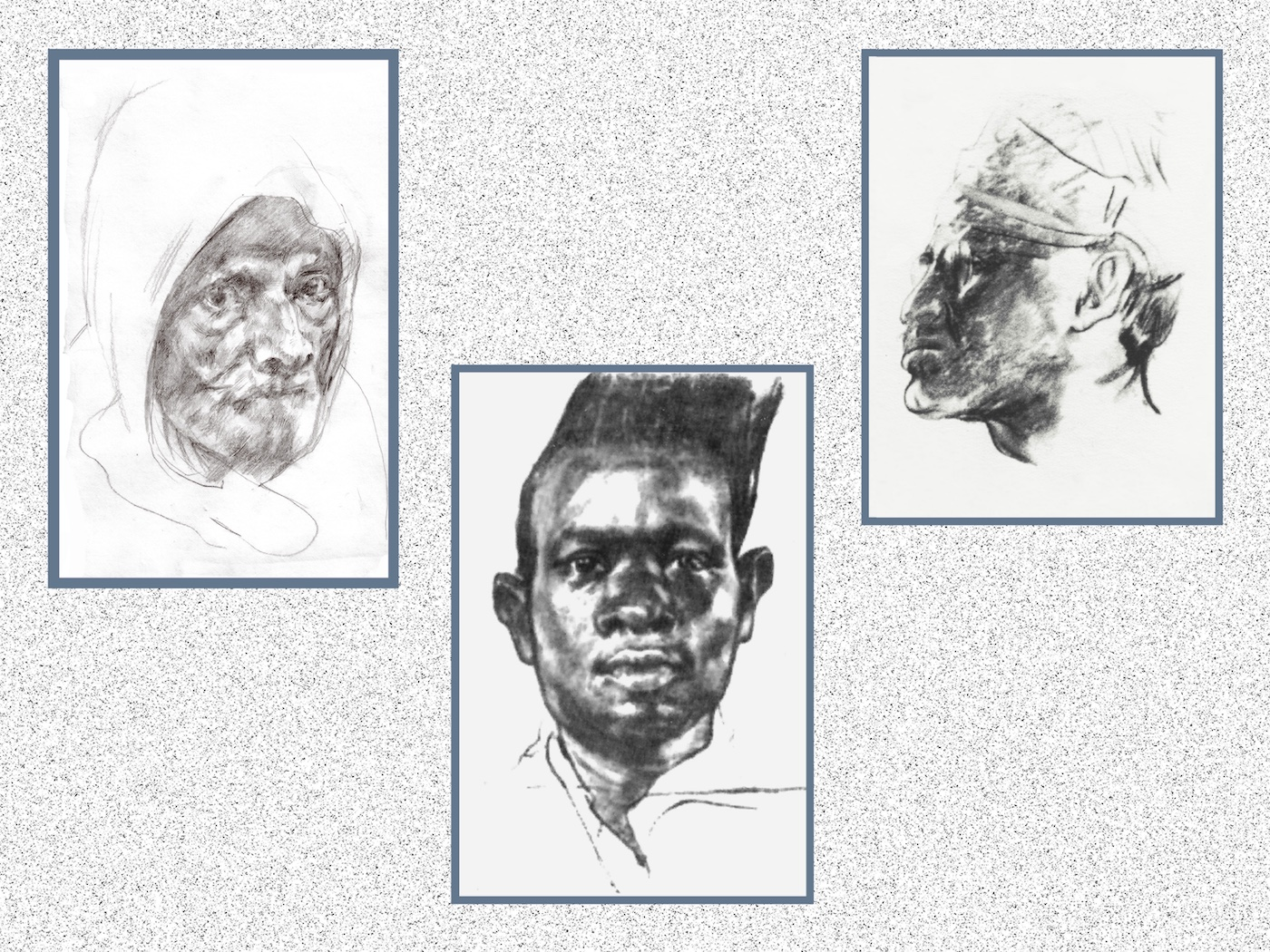

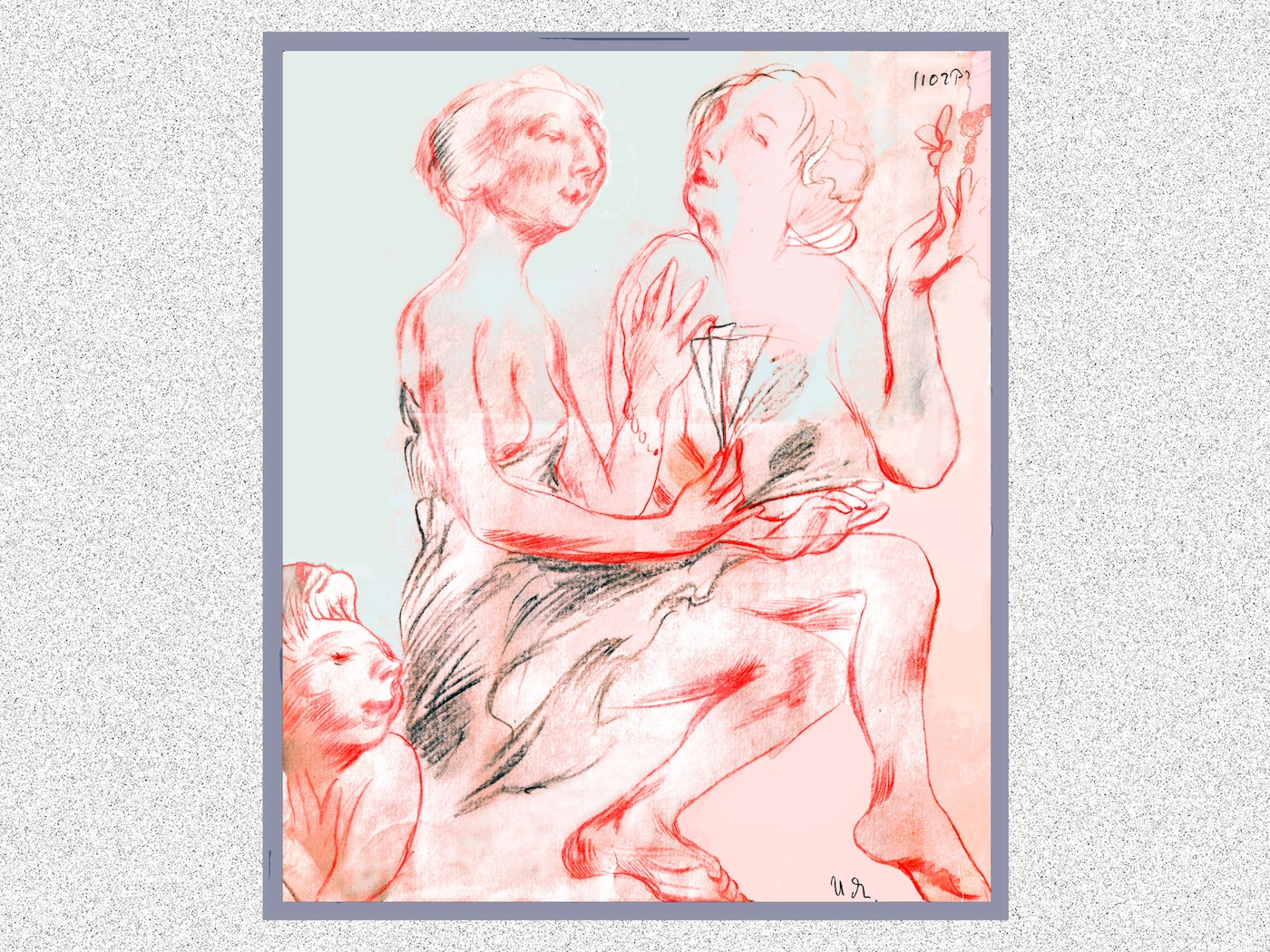

== Family ==
First family – wife Galina Barvinok, son Alexander.
After repatriation to Israel, he married a second time. Wife – Svetlana Shtutina Jackerson, stepdaughter Anna.

== Sources ==
- Josef Jackerson Biography
- Art of Russia and the West, Apollon Foundation, 1989 (page 60-63)
- Josef Jackerson. Eduard Nakhamkin Fine Arts, New York, NY
- Josef Jackerson: Selected Drawings, Mockups and Study Aids
- Opera "Nabucco" by Giuseppe Verdi at the Bonn Opera in Germany
- Isaac Babel. Sunset
- Russian emigres win place in artistic sun, FREDERICK M. WINSHIP, UPI
