= Ji Sheng =

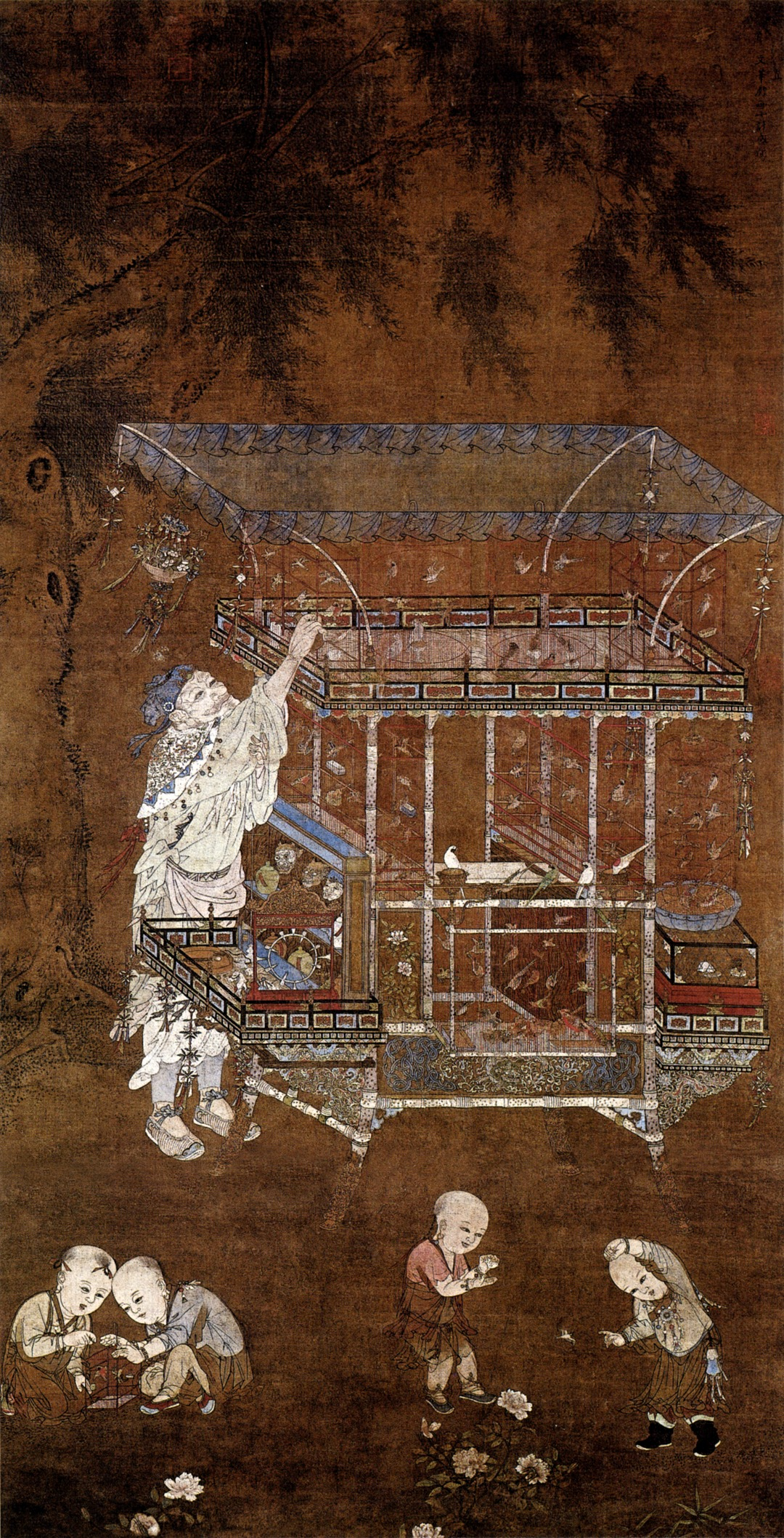
Ji Sheng, Peddler, Palace Museum

Ji Sheng (simplified Chinese: 计盛; traditional Chinese: 計盛; pinyin: Jì Shèng; Wade–Giles: Chi Sheng), was a Chinese imperial painter during the Xuande era of the Ming dynasty. His birth and death years are unknown.
