= A. B. Jackson (painter) =

American painter

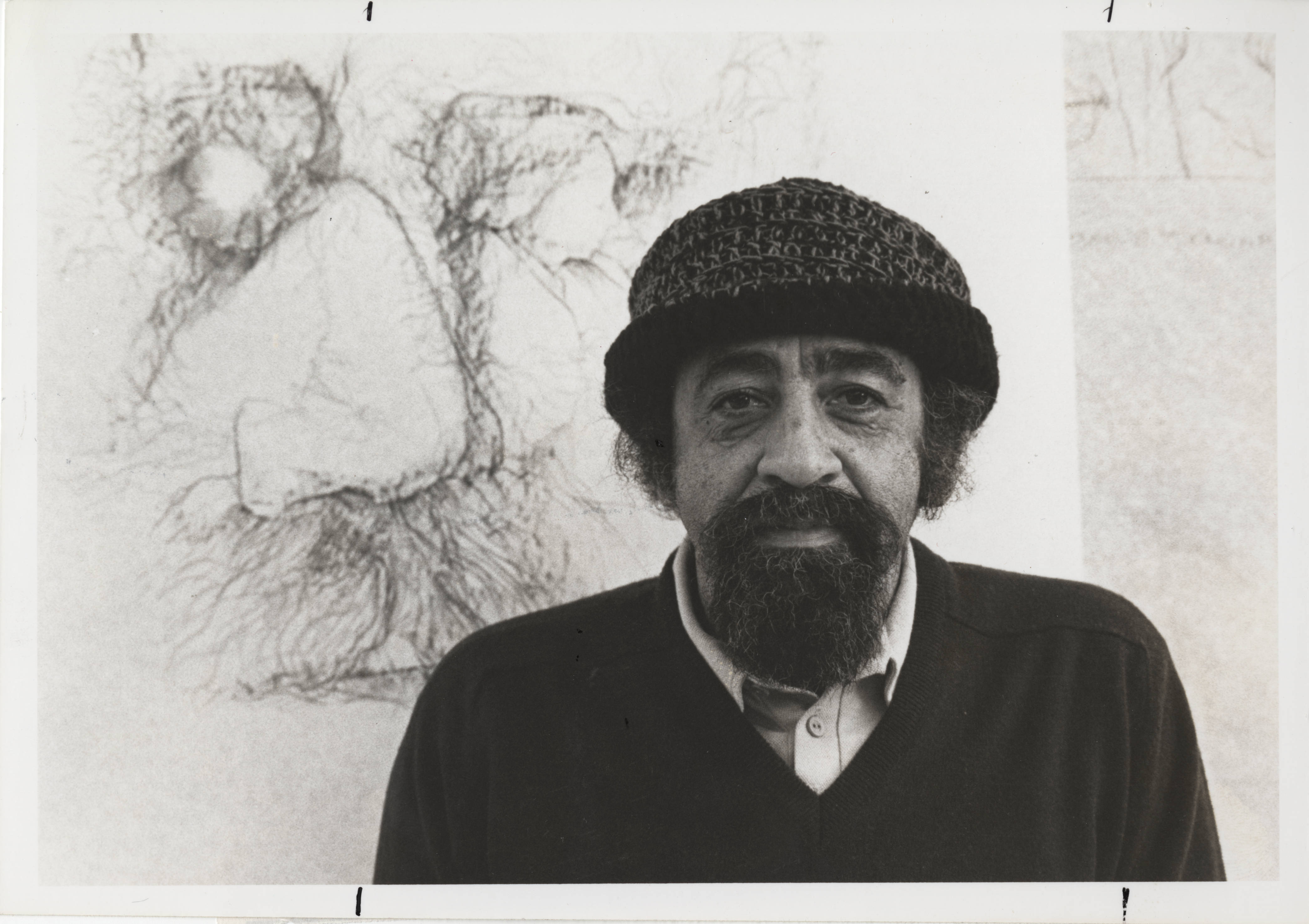
Alexander Brooks Jackson

Alexander Brooks Jackson (April 18, 1925 – March 23, 1981) was an American painter.

== Life and career ==
Jackson was born in New Haven, Connecticut, the son of a black father and an English mother born in Manchester. He earned BFA and MFA degrees from Yale University, studying with Josef Albers in the mid-1950s. Before entering the teaching field, he spent three years as a designer in the Watson-Manning Advertising Agency in Stratford, Connecticut.

He taught briefly at Southern University in Baton Rouge, Louisiana in 1955, before moving to Norfolk, Virginia in 1956. In 1967, after teaching 10 years at Norfolk State, he joined Old Dominion University (ODU) as a full professor and its first black faculty member.

During his teaching years in Norfolk, Jackson also exhibited his work in many local venues. After being denied entry to the Virginia Beach Boardwalk Art show in 1962 because of his race, he won best-in-show there in 1966. He received significant attention in 1968 when several of his drawings were included in a Smithsonian Institution traveling art exhibition.

Influenced by Rembrandt, Jackson worked in a range of materials, including watercolors, pastels, charcoal and acrylic. His series of paintings "The Porch People" depicts anonymous sitters on their porches in Ghent, the district of Norfolk, Virginia, where he lived. His book As I See Ghent: A Visual Essay was published in 1979.

Jackson died in 1981 at age 55, in Norfolk, Virginia.

He is represented in the permanent collections of:

- Mint Museum of Art
- University of Virginia
- Yale University
- Harvard University
- Dartmouth College Museum
- Howard University
- North Carolina State University
- Old Dominion University
- Longwood College
- Louisiana Arts & Sciences Museum
- Muscarelle Museum of Art
- Virginia Museum of Fine Arts
- Chrysler Museum of Art (three-site retrospective exhibition)
- Smithsonian Institution

== Legacy ==
Passerby: An A.B. Jackson Retrospective showed at ODU's Baron and Ellin Gordon Art Galleries from May 23 to August 2, 2015.

== Personal life ==
Jackson was the maternal grandfather of professional American football quarterback Russell Wilson.
