= Dances of the Yao =

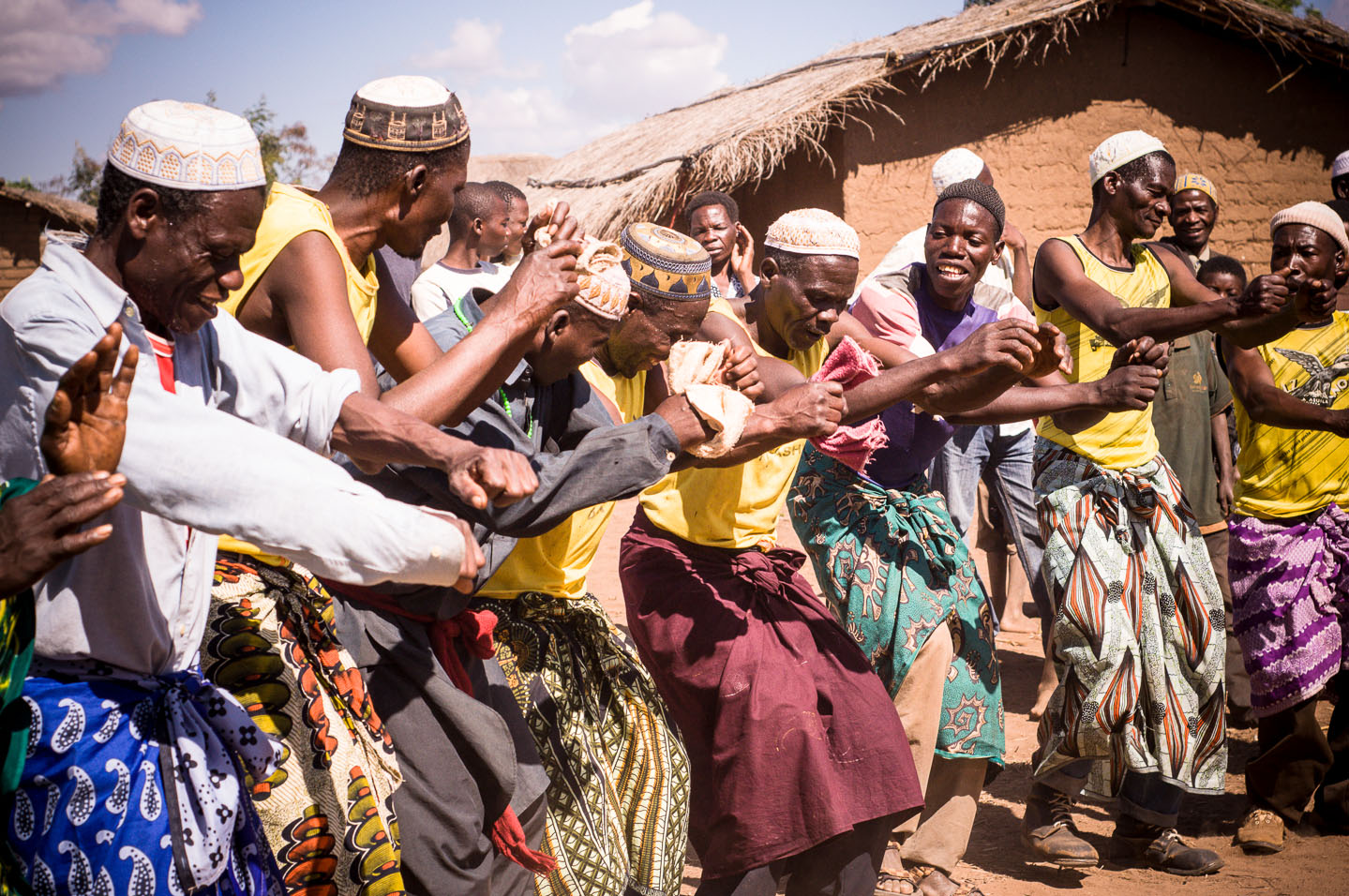
Sikili dance during the Islamic Syala festival near Chikaloni, Mandimba in Mozambique

The Yao are a predominantly Muslim ethnic group of about 2 million spread over three countries: Malawi, northern Mozambique, and the Ruvuma and Mtwara regions of Tanzania. They have numerous dances to enhance celebrations throughout the calendar year. The dances are often segregated based on gender. The majority of dances fall around the initiation times for boys and girls while others are seen during religious festivals such as the syala.

== Inheritance ==
In 2012 the President of Joyce Banda encouraged the Yao people to value their culture. She was a member of the Yao people. She was speaking at the uMthetho Cultural Festival for the Ngoni people in Mzimba.

== Types of Yao dances ==
=== Amalilo ===
The Amalilo is a large group dance involving both men and women usually seen during the end of unyago (initiation) periods.

==== Yao Amalilo dance in Chanika, Mandimba, Niassa, Mozambique 2011 & video from 2013 ====
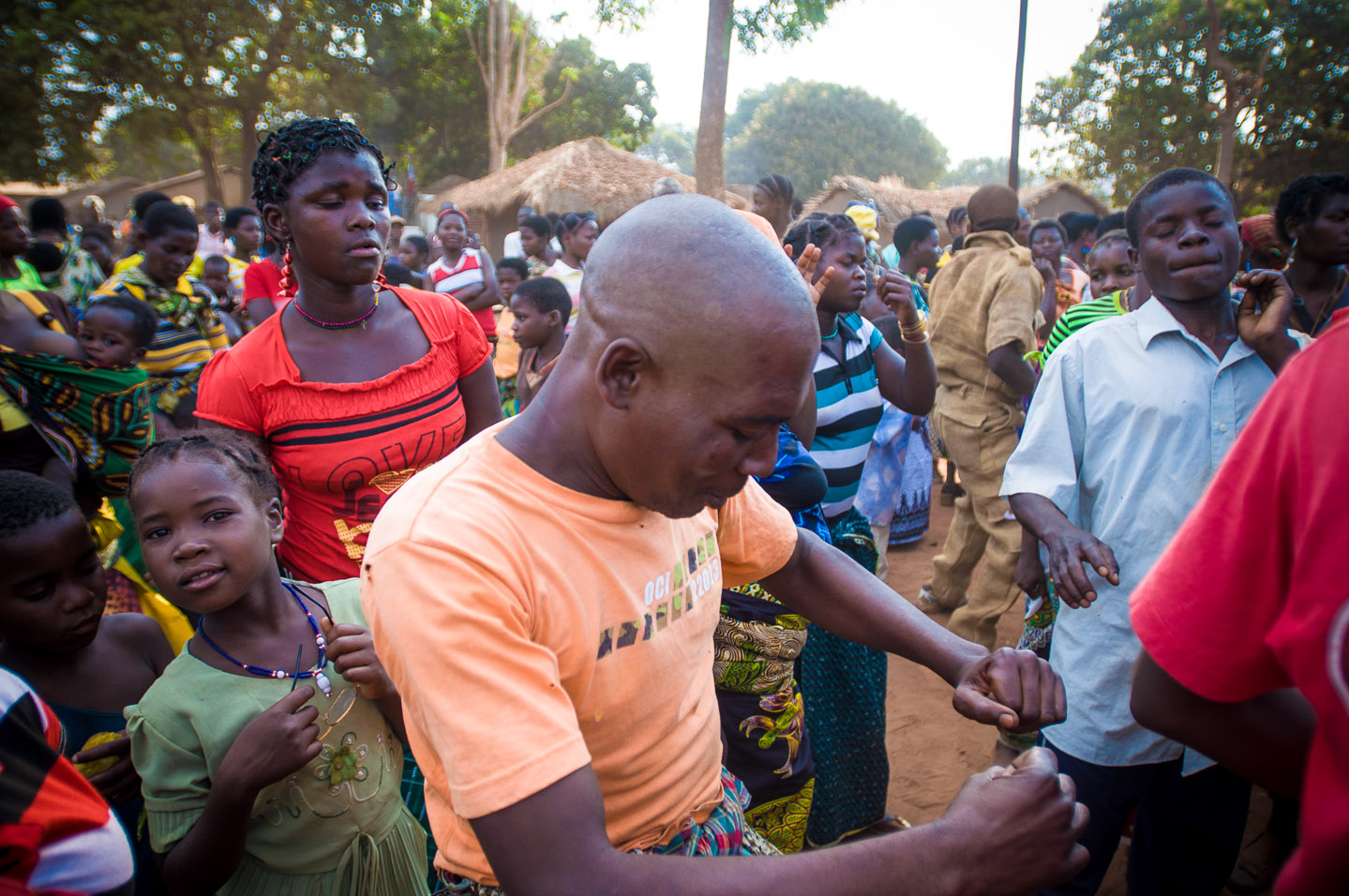

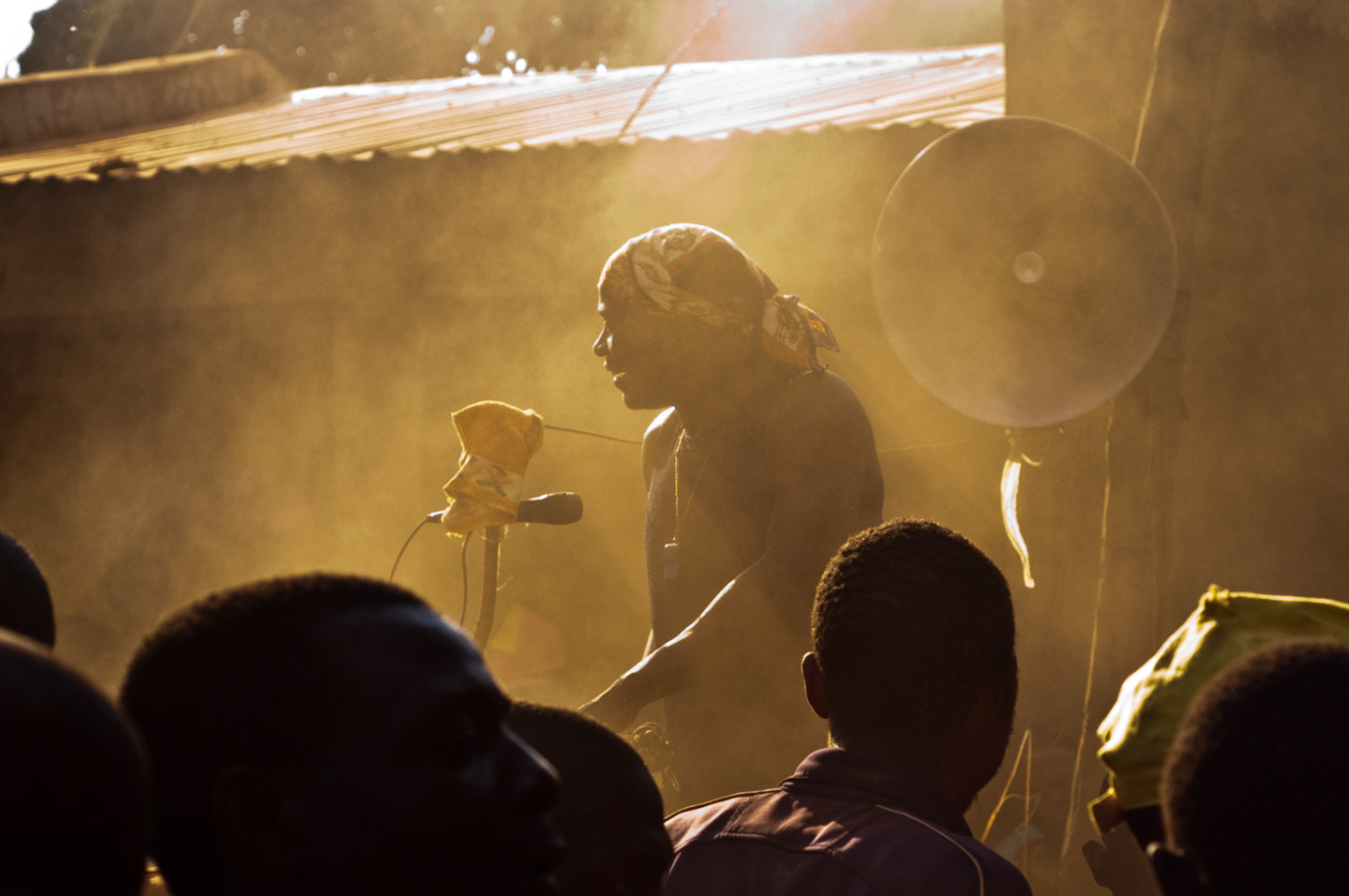

=== Beni ===
The Beni is a popular dance involving men of all ages in which the dancers dress up like soldiers in homemade uniforms. It is based on the experiences of people during the first ans second world wars. It is based on the parades of men in the armed services, but women and children join in. Military tunics, khaki clothes and medals are worn. UNESCO have documented this dance being performed in the districts of Dedza, Mangochi, Machinga and Salima.

==== Yao Beni dance in Majuni, Mangochi, Malawi 2006 ====
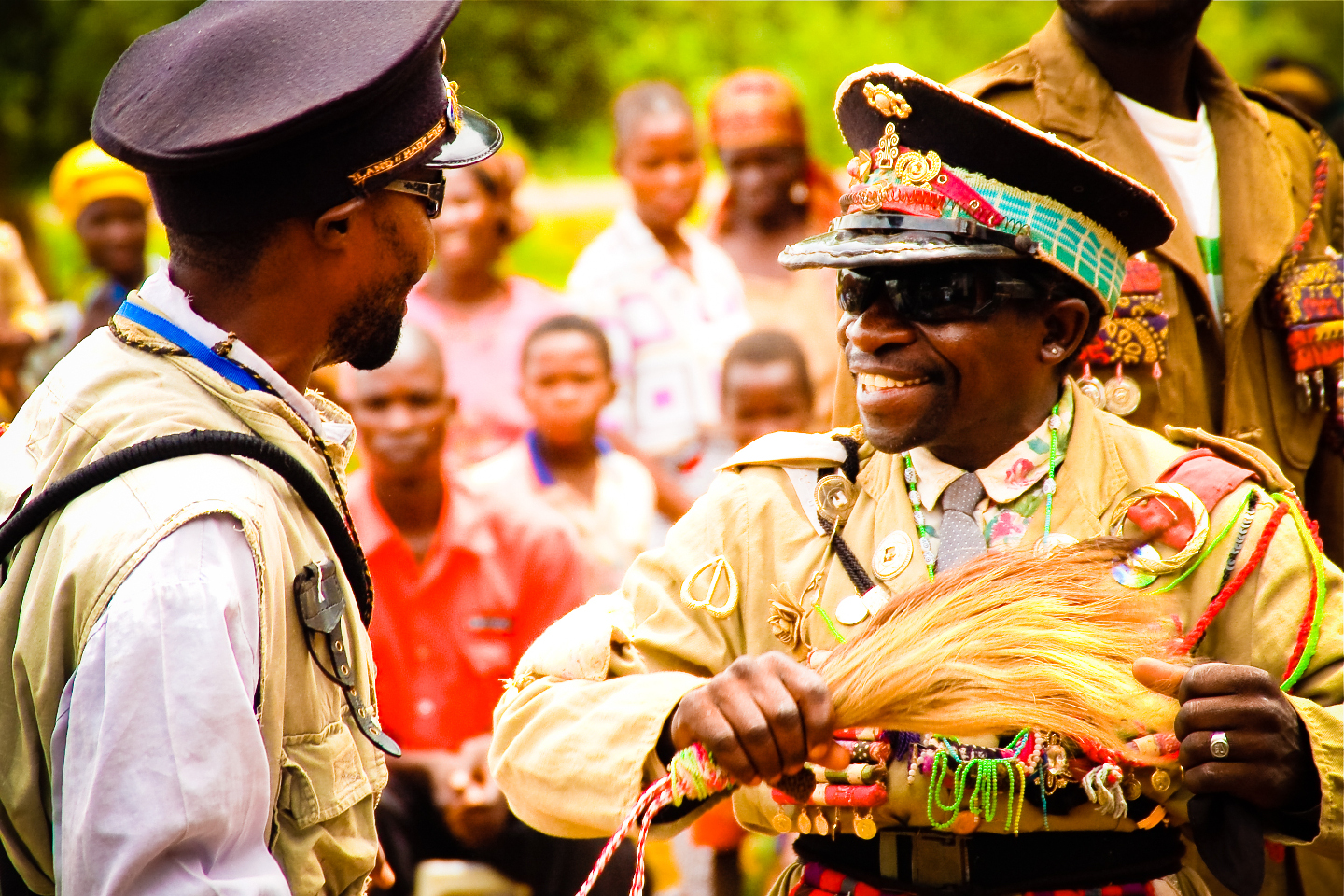

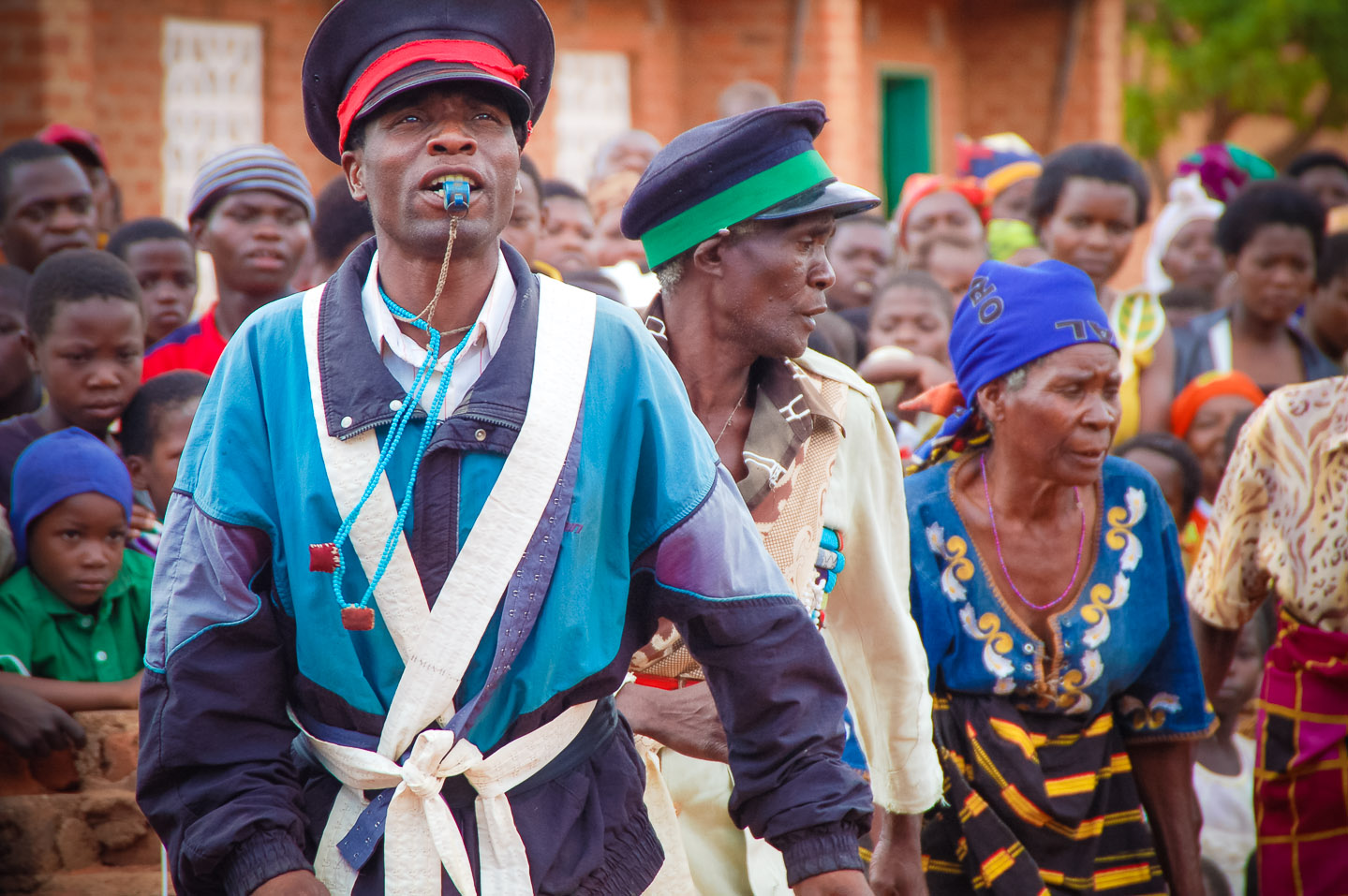

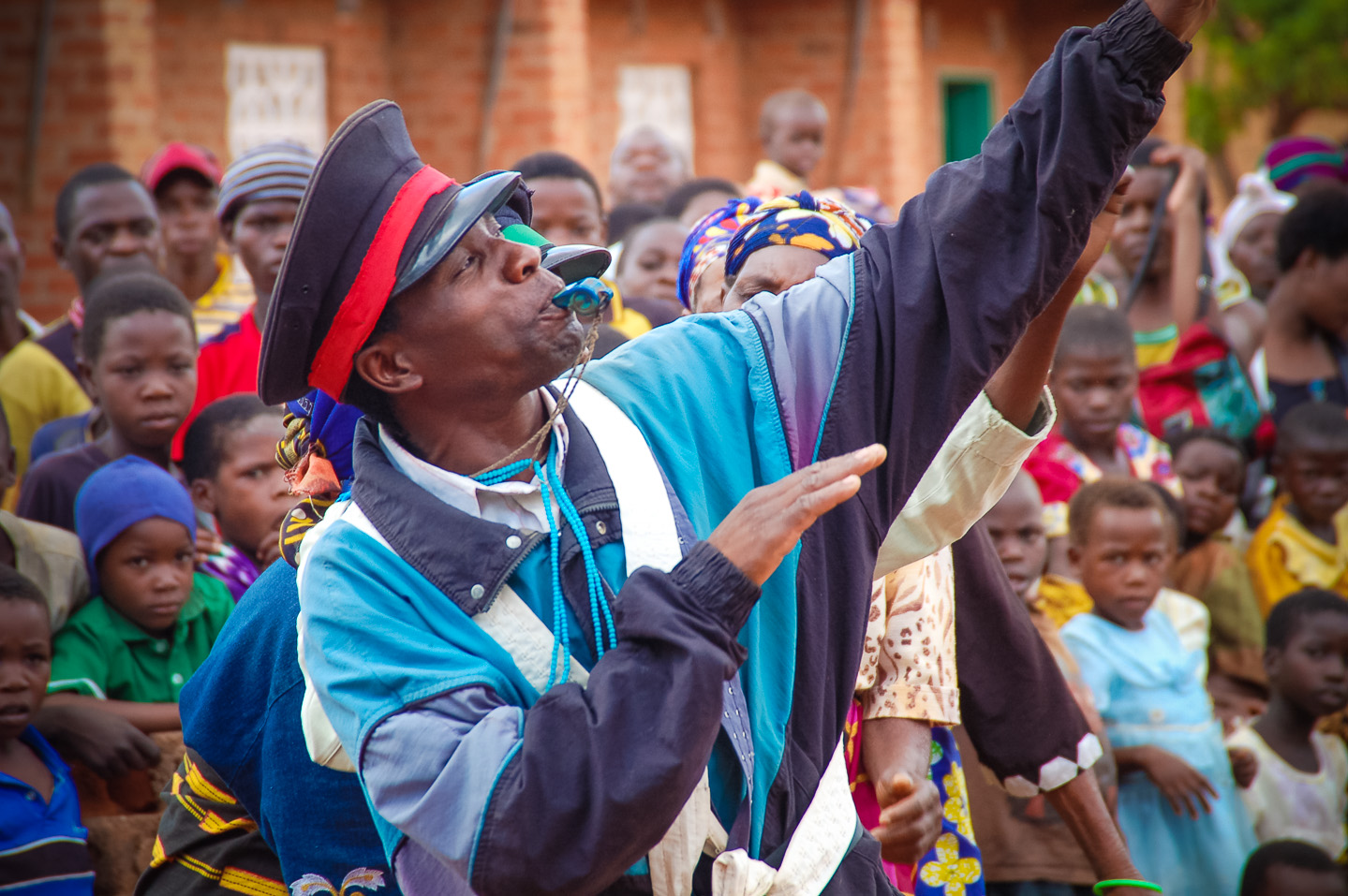

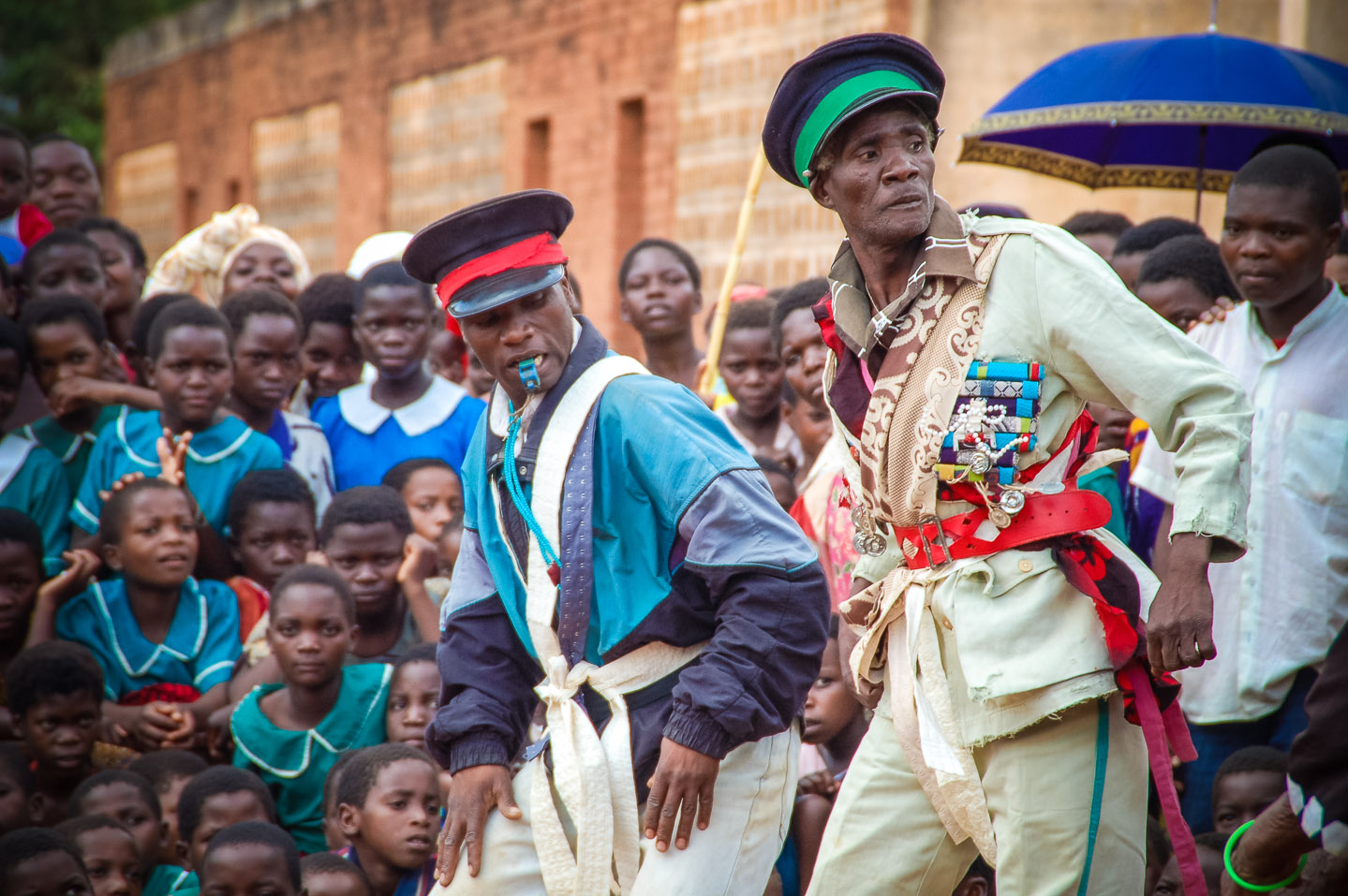

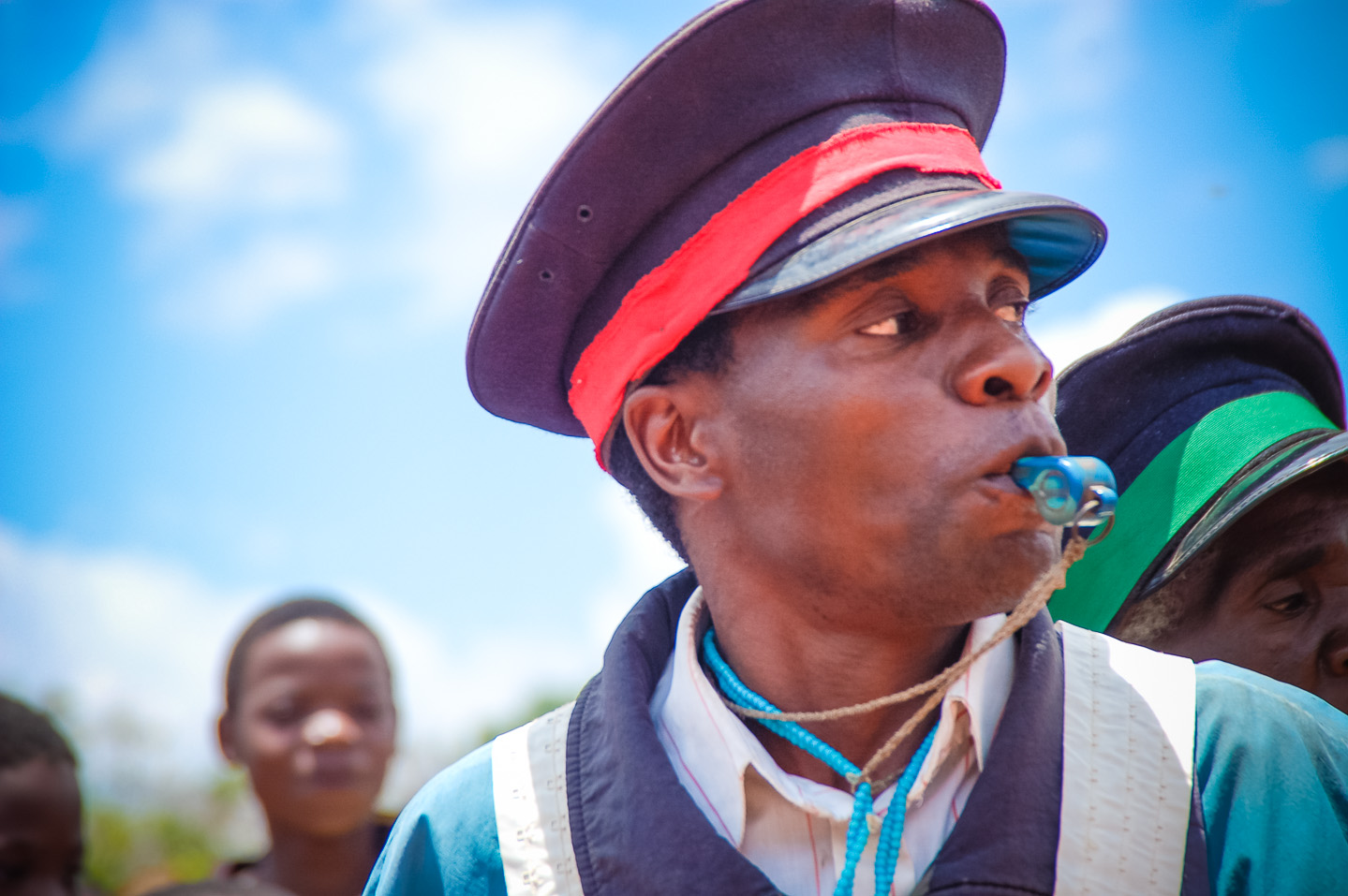

=== Chamba ===
The Chamba is a secretive dance held during the second phase of msondo in which only women or girls who have gone through initiation can be present. Lessons are taught on hygiene, childrearing and more during these dances.

=== Chisakasa ===
This dance is only for women and is related to the birth of a woman's first child. It is usually an all-night affair.

=== Chiwoda ===
The Chiwoda is an older women's dance often seen during public events. It is said to be based on the idea of "an order" which was sent by a man working away in Zimbabwe to his family for a girl to be sent. It was said that a girl returned after finding the man who sent it had a disease of the eye. Organisations developed to perform the Chiwoda and modern dances were included. UNESCO noted this dance in Karonga, Mangothi, Nkhata Bay, Nkhotakota, and Salima.

=== Likwata ===
The Likwata is a celebratory dance in which only old women are involved. It is performed for entertainment now but it was performed during the initiation of boys, funerals and the installation of new chiefs. It is performed in Zomba, Chiradzulu, Thyolo, Mulanje, Mangochi and Blantyre Districts. Spectators would encourage the dancers who arranged in a semi-circle by giving them gifts.

==== Yao Likwata dance in Majuni, Mangochi, Malawi 2006 ====
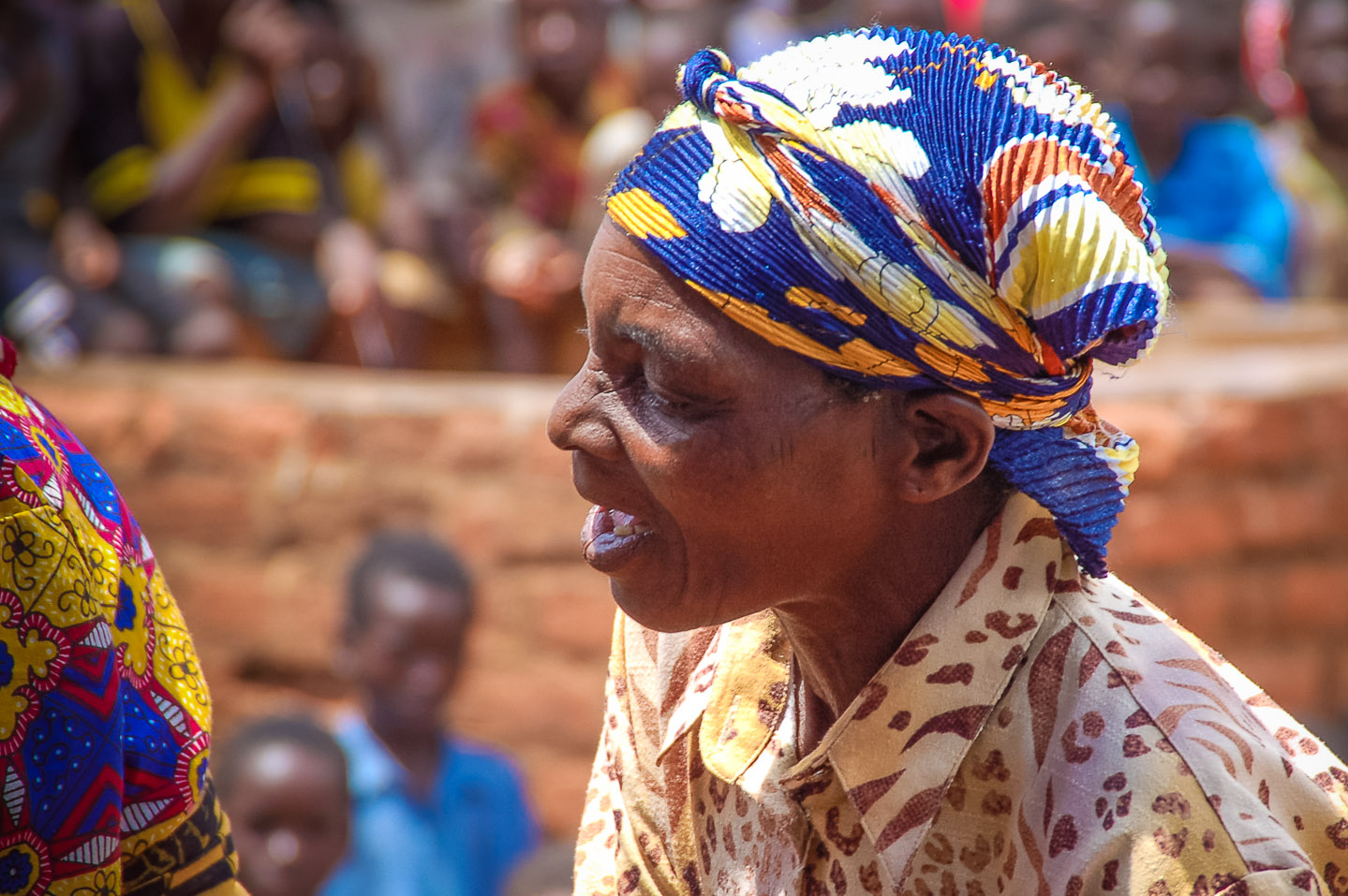

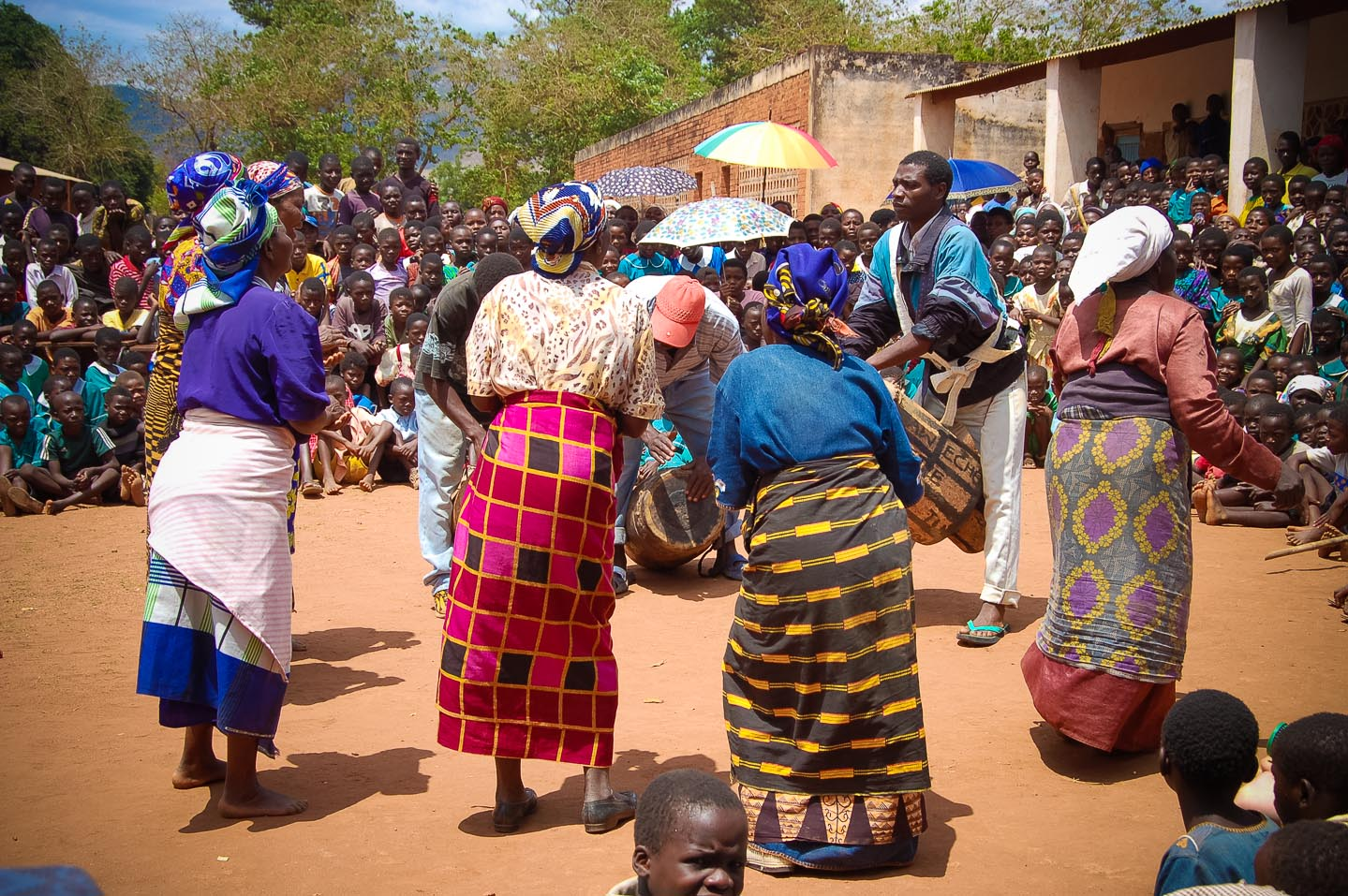

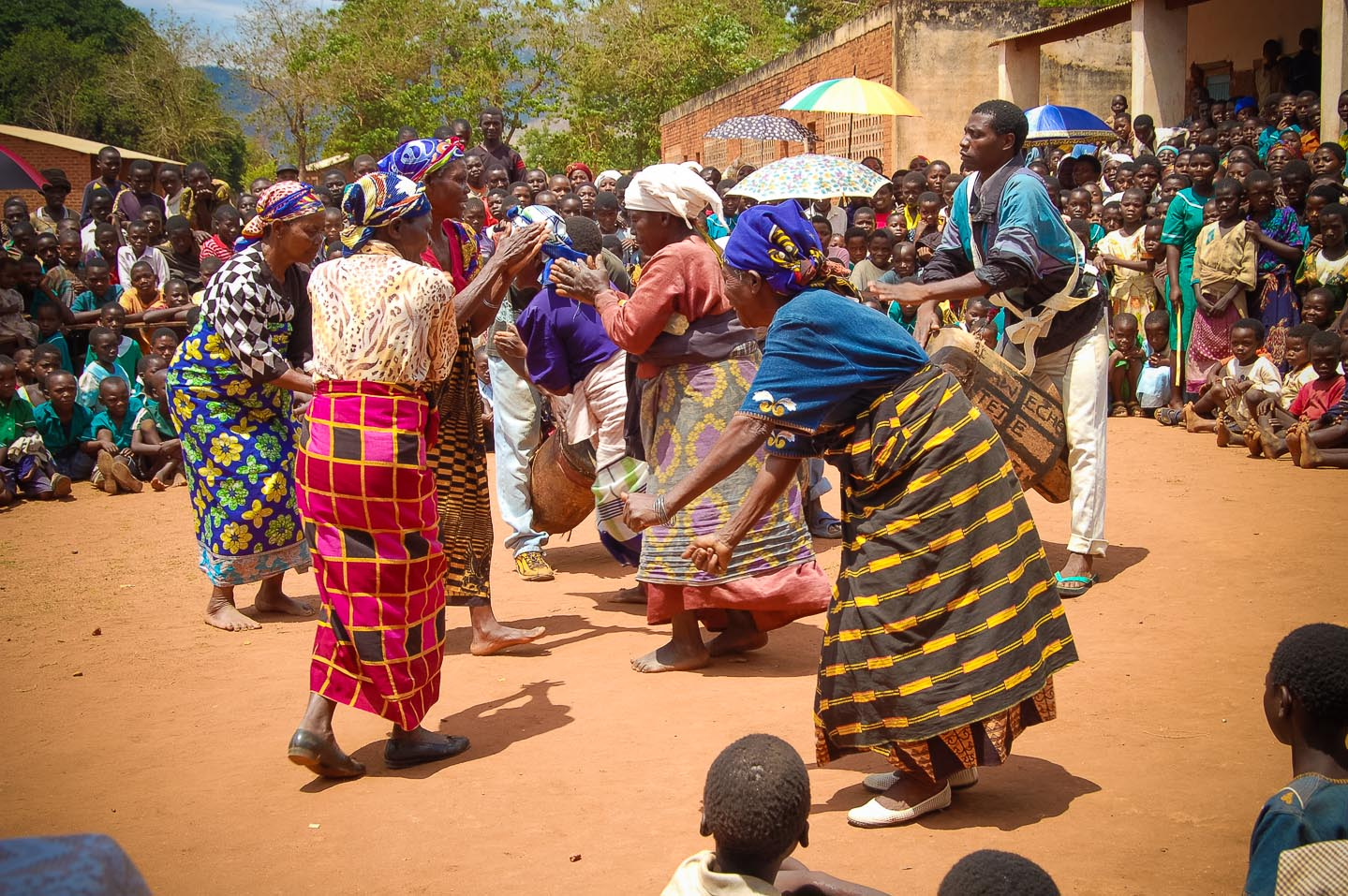

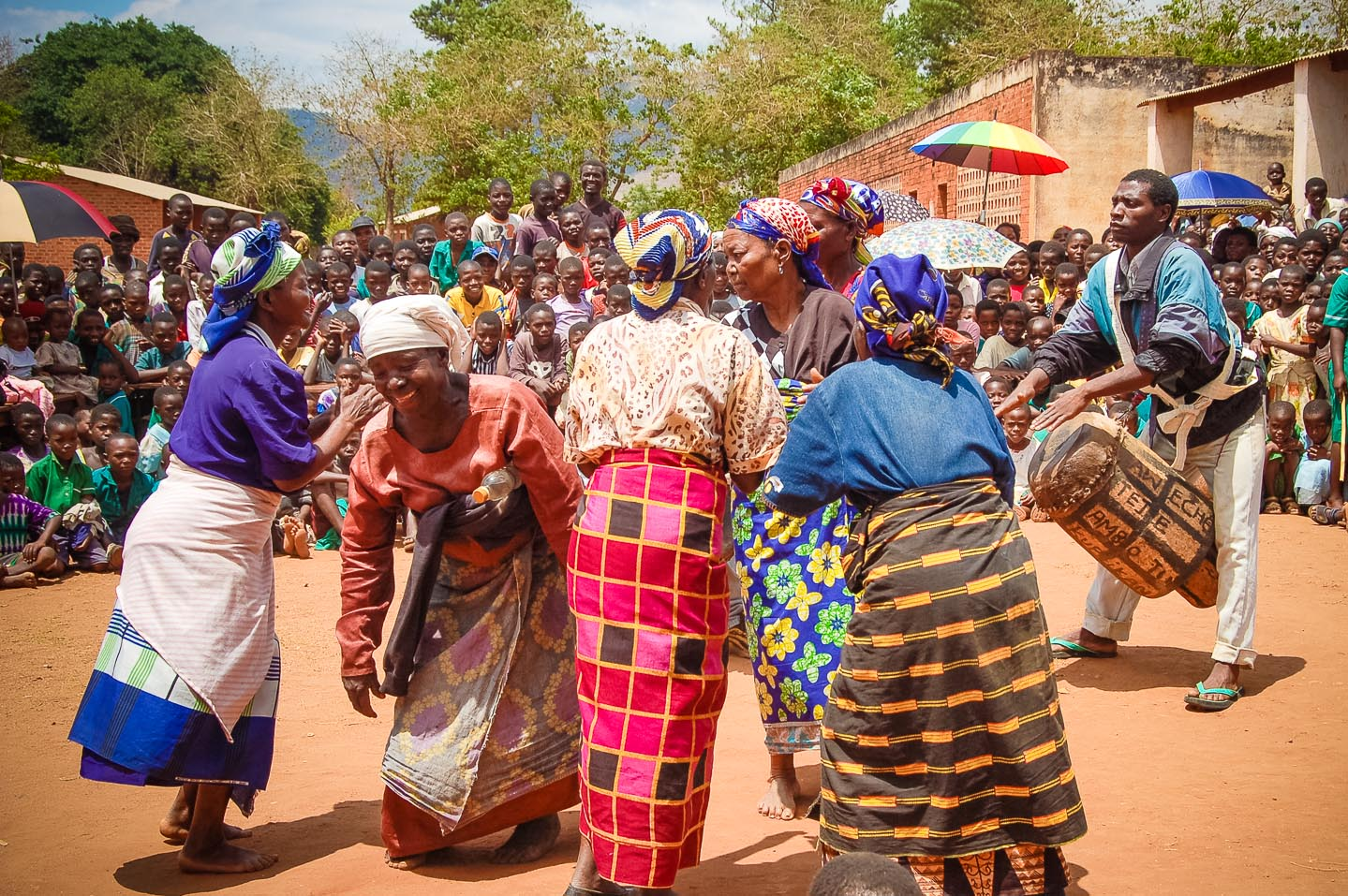

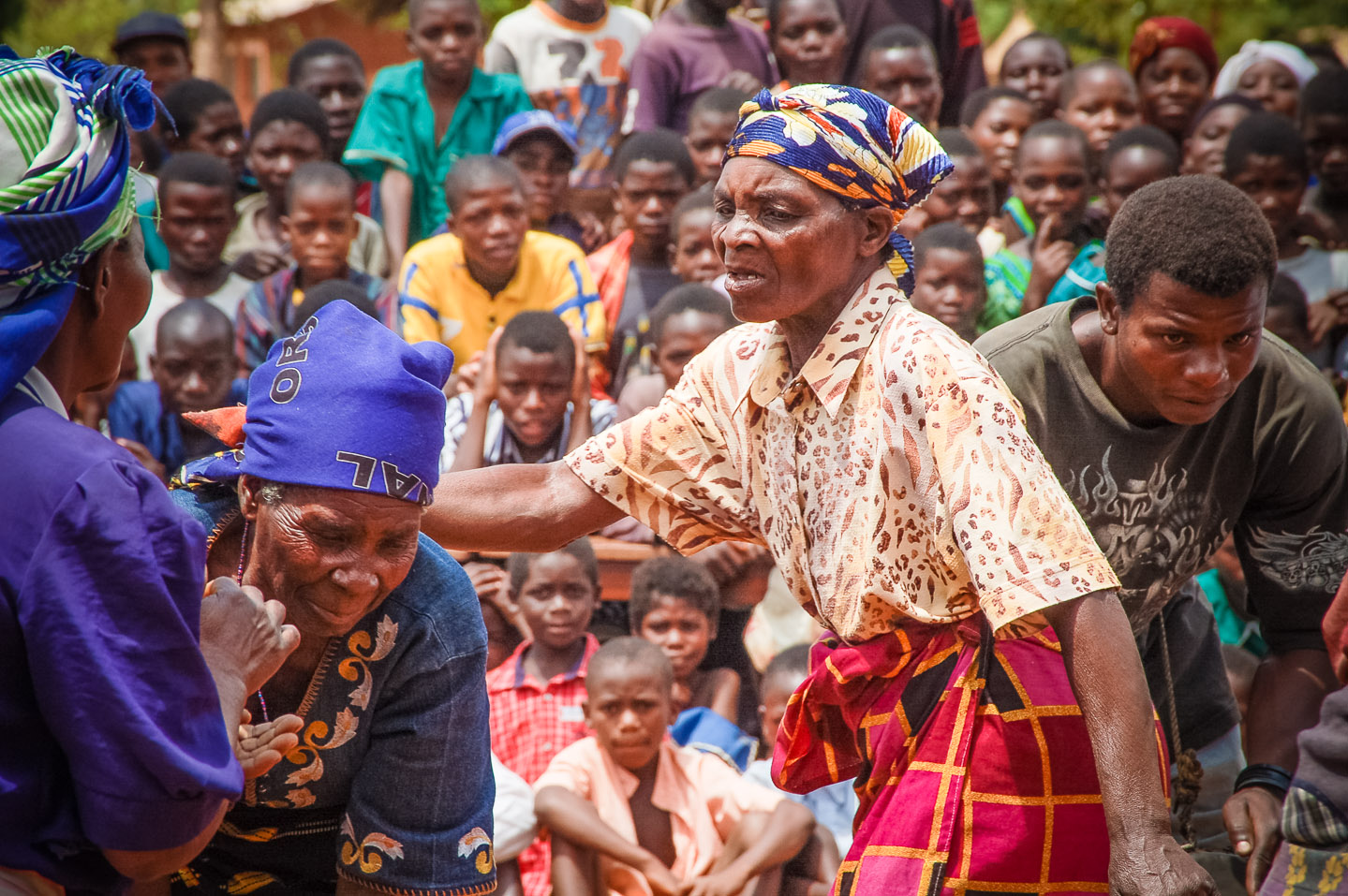

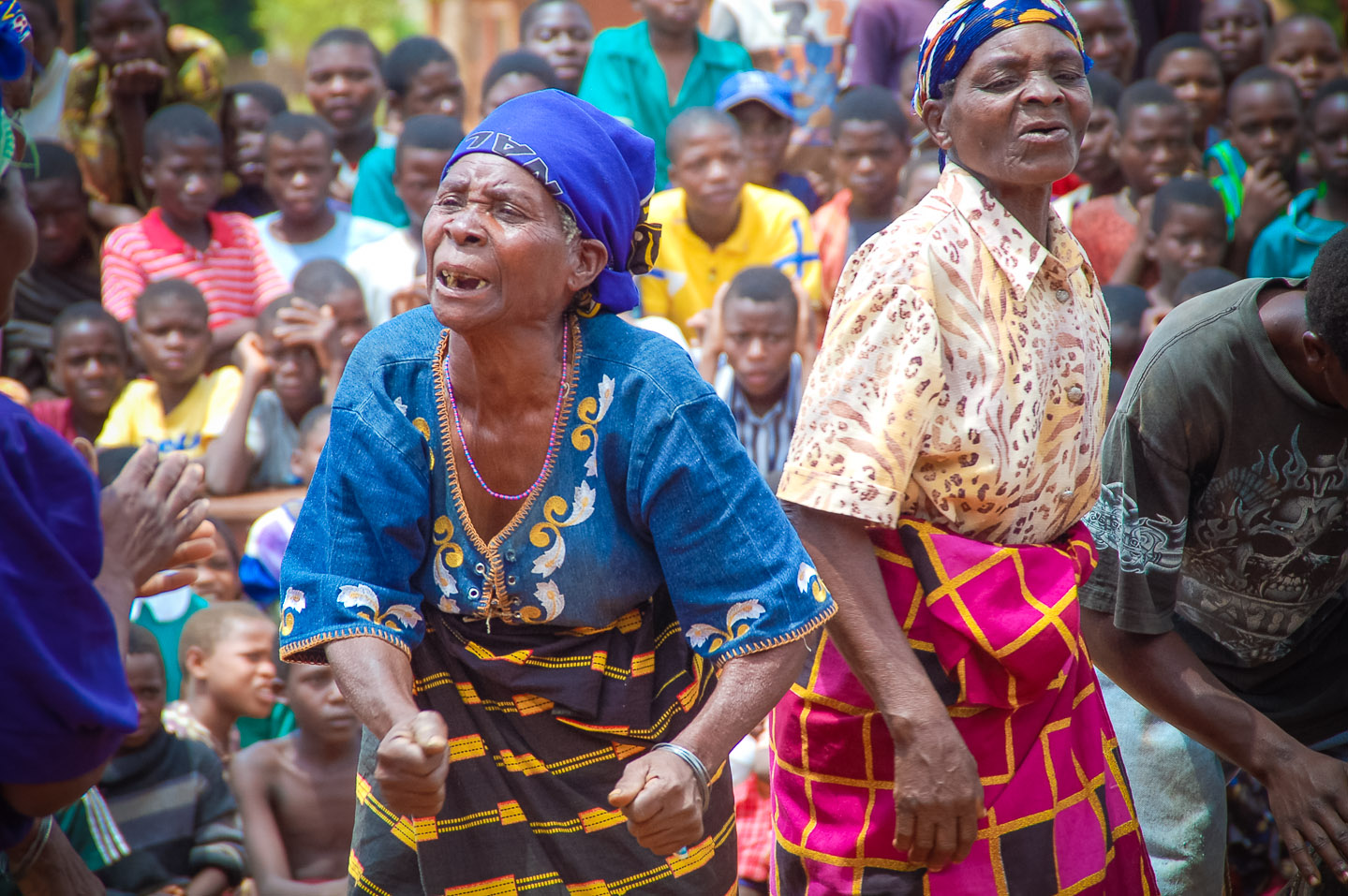

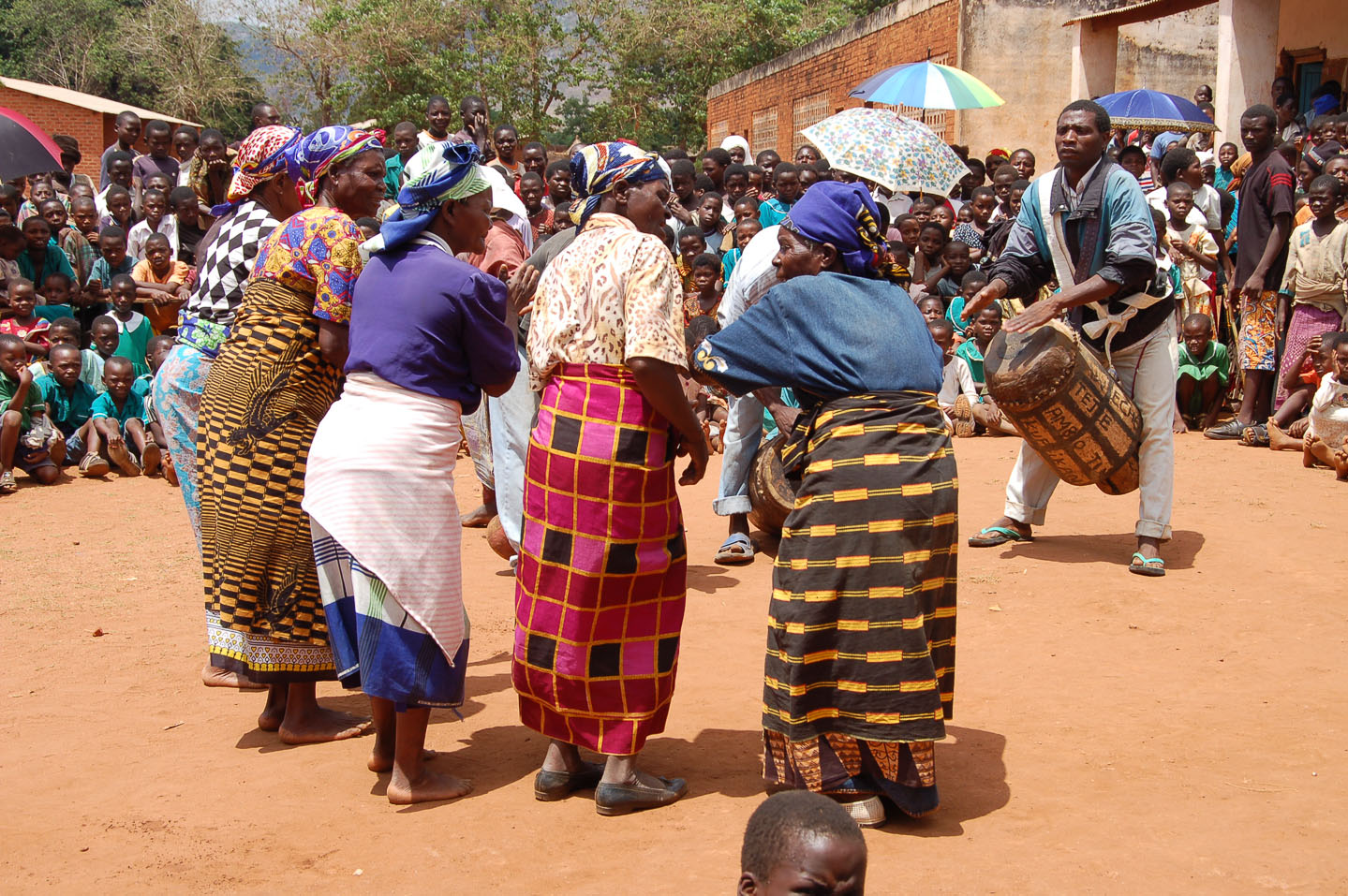

=== Lupanda ===
This dance is associated with the tradition of male circumcision in the Mangochi district. In some cases its performance could only be permitted by a chief. It is organised by the circumciser (ngaliba). The manganje dance is sometimes used instead and its purpose is to entertain. The ngaliba dresses in a feminine way with berlls of the angles and feathers on the head.

=== Lyogo ===
The Lyogo is a dance seen during the time in which boys and girls are entering the unyago (initiation) camps.

=== Makwayela ===
The Makwayela is a public dance performed by women of all ages.

=== Manganje ===
The Manganje is a sexual group dance held late at night.

The dance is performed when boys emerge from being initiated, UNESCO noted it as a Yao dance performed in the districts of Blantyre, Machinga, Mangochi, Zomba and Chiradzulu.

=== Manawa ===
The Manawa is a girl's dance performed during nsondo (initiation).

=== Masewe ===
The Masewe is a dance performed by younger men during the time of unyago (initiation). UNESCO have noted it in the Yao and the Lomwe people in Machinga, Mangochi and the Zomba districts. There are drums and there is a leader and the performances can be acrobatic where the grass skirted men create towers by standing on each others shoulders. It is said to have been performed historically at funerals.

=== Mawulidi ===
The Mawulidi is a celebratory dance held by female family members of a woman who has just had a child after a long time in which no children have been born to her. The baby is passed around from woman to woman during the dance.

=== Msondo ===
The Msondo is a dance for women only performed during times of girl's initiation. Considered by some to be quite immoral as the girls allow men to touch their breasts for gifts and they identify partners to have sex with. The dances are performed in public but they follow weeks of training where the girls are told how to satisfy their husbands.

=== Sikili ===
The Sikili is a religious Muslim dance in which men or women dance during syala events.

==== Yao Sikili dance near Chikaloni, Mandimba, Niassa, Mozambique 2013 (exception of video) ====
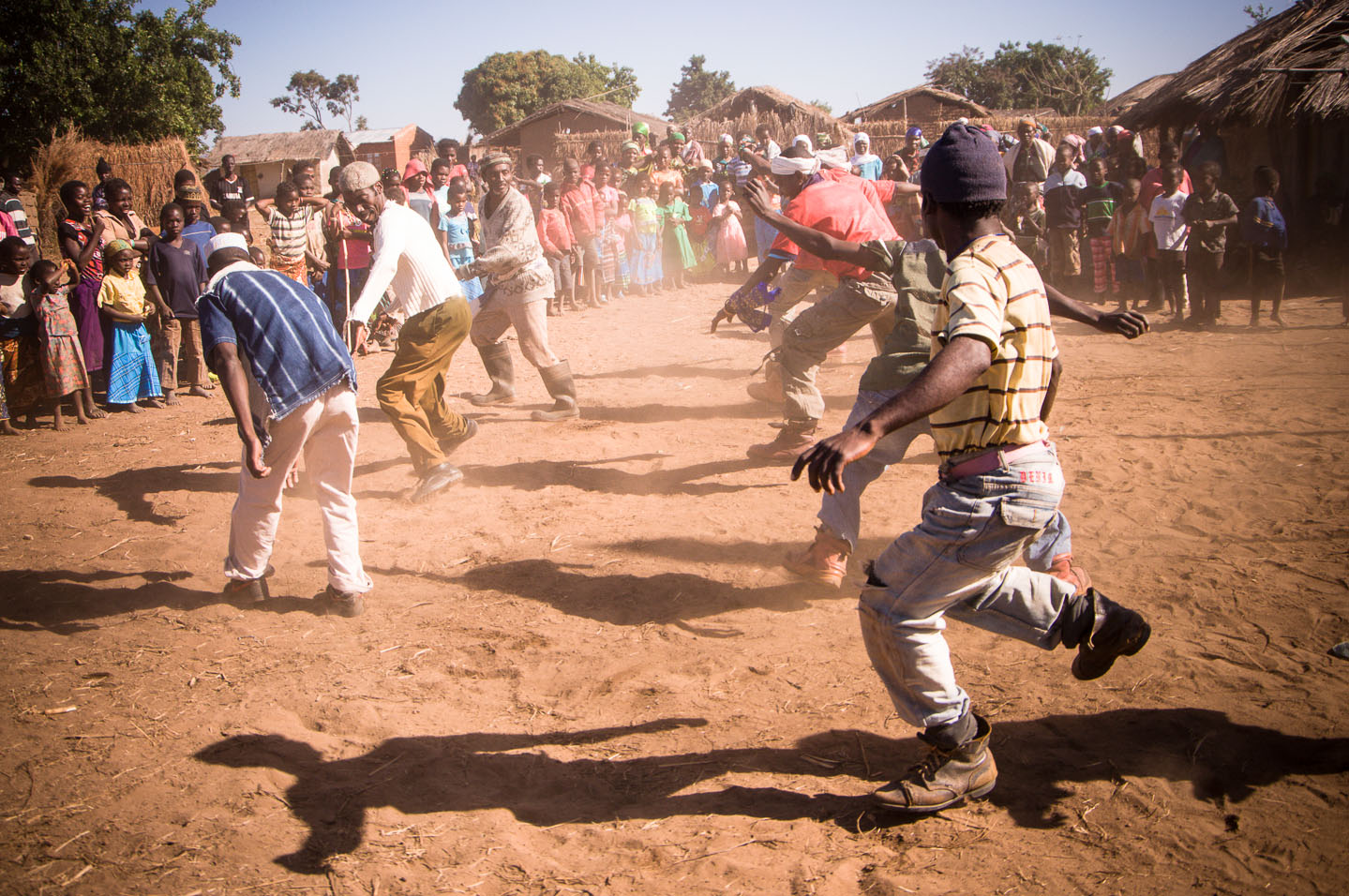

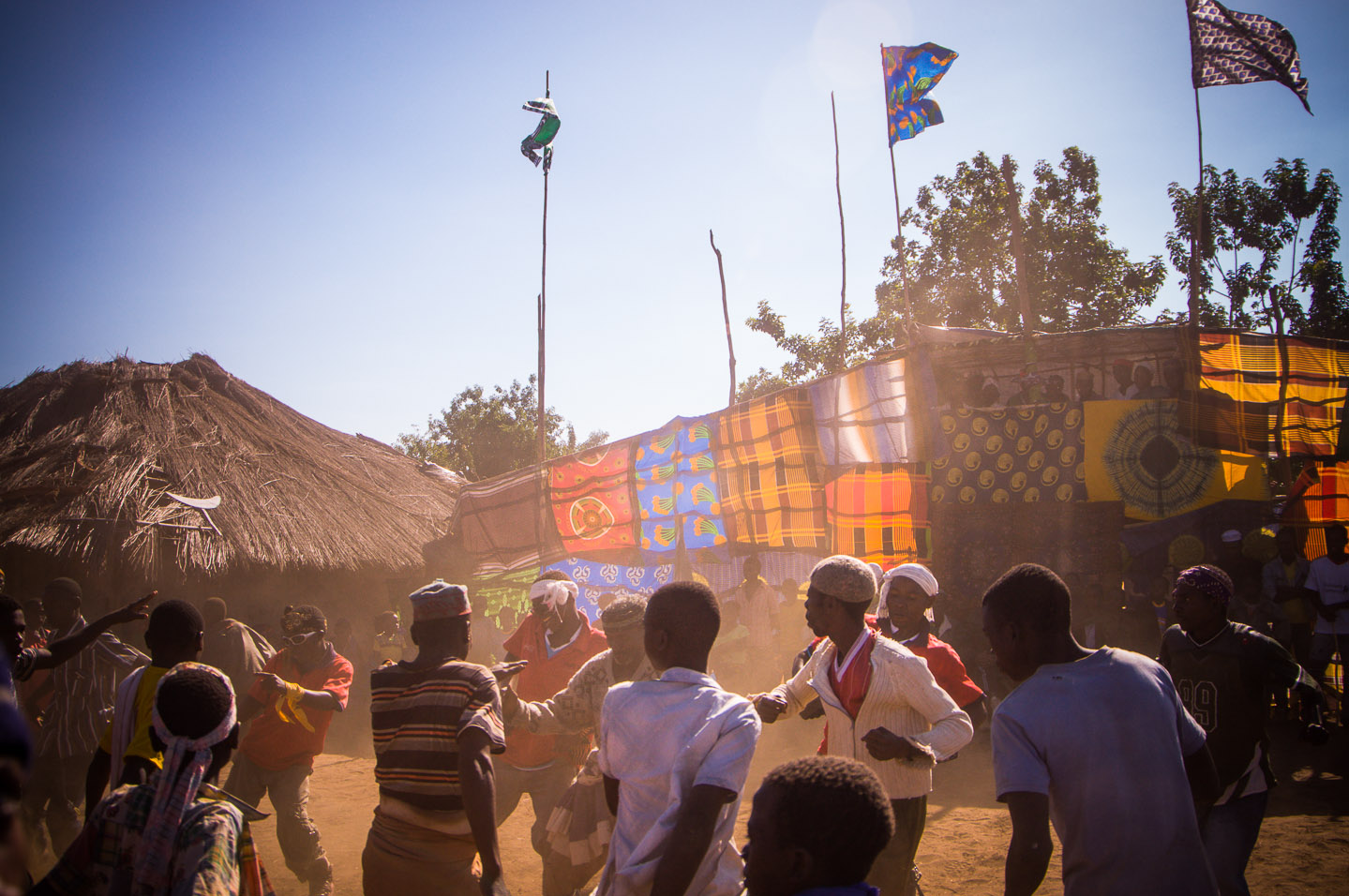

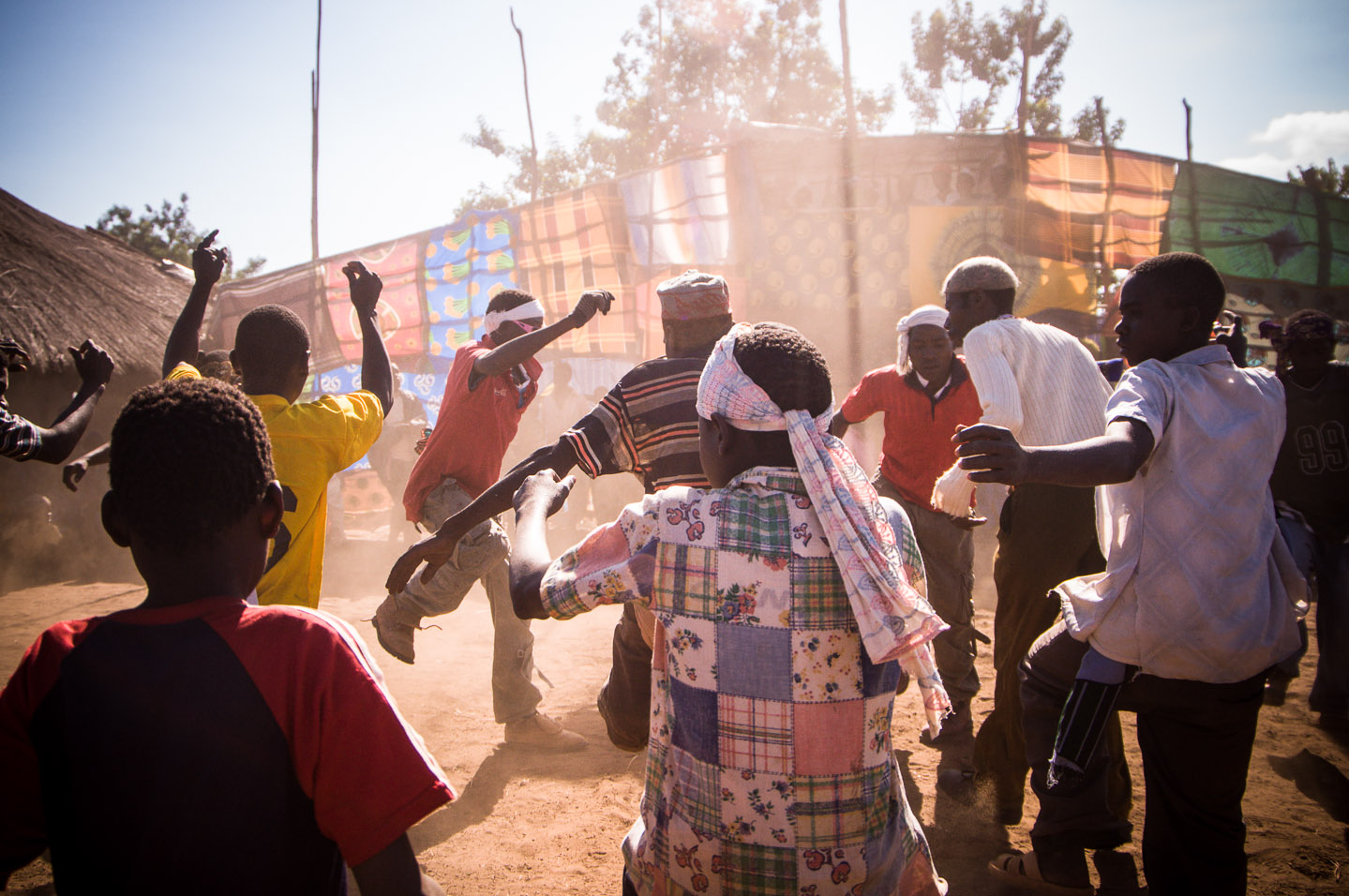

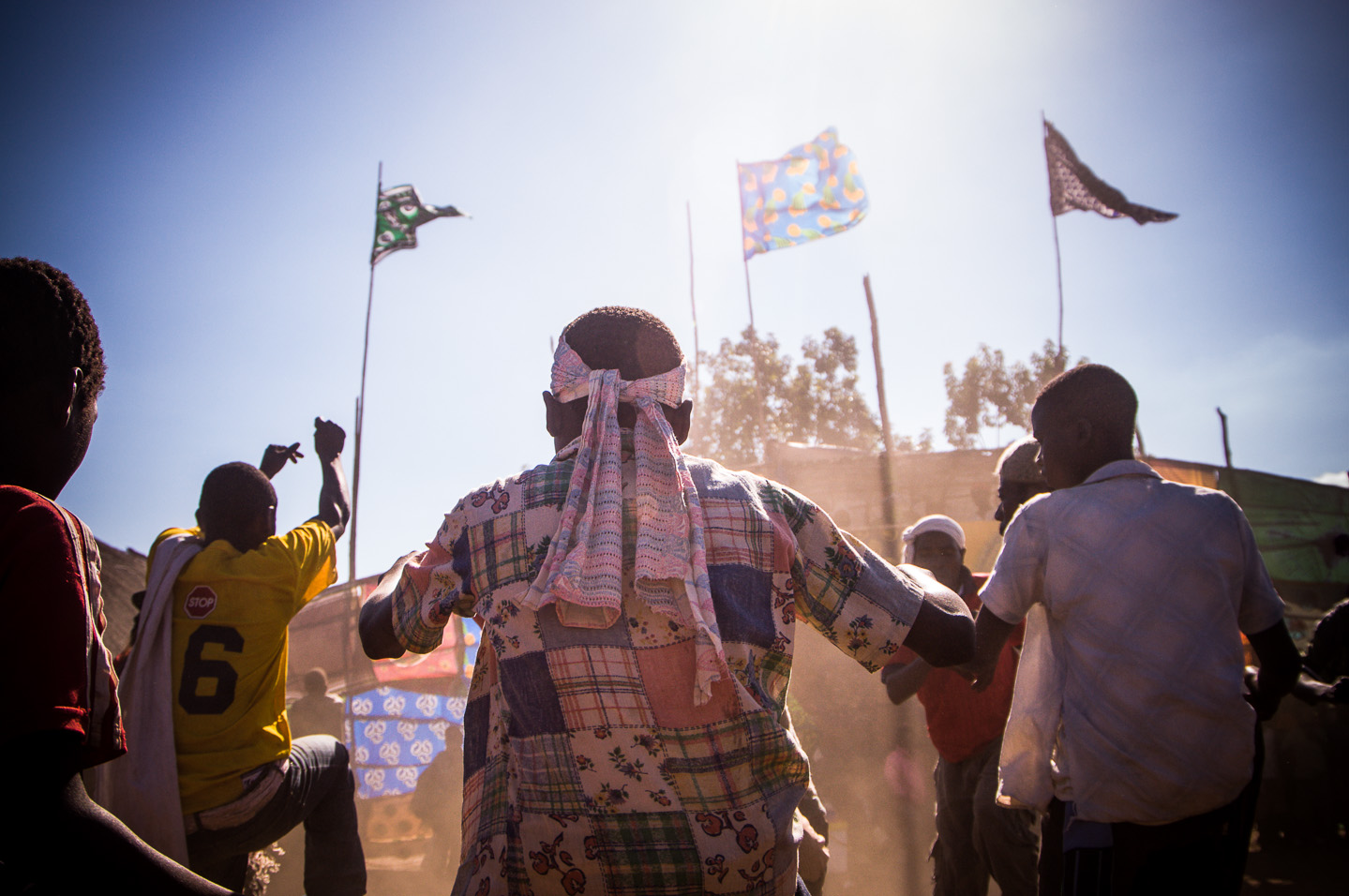

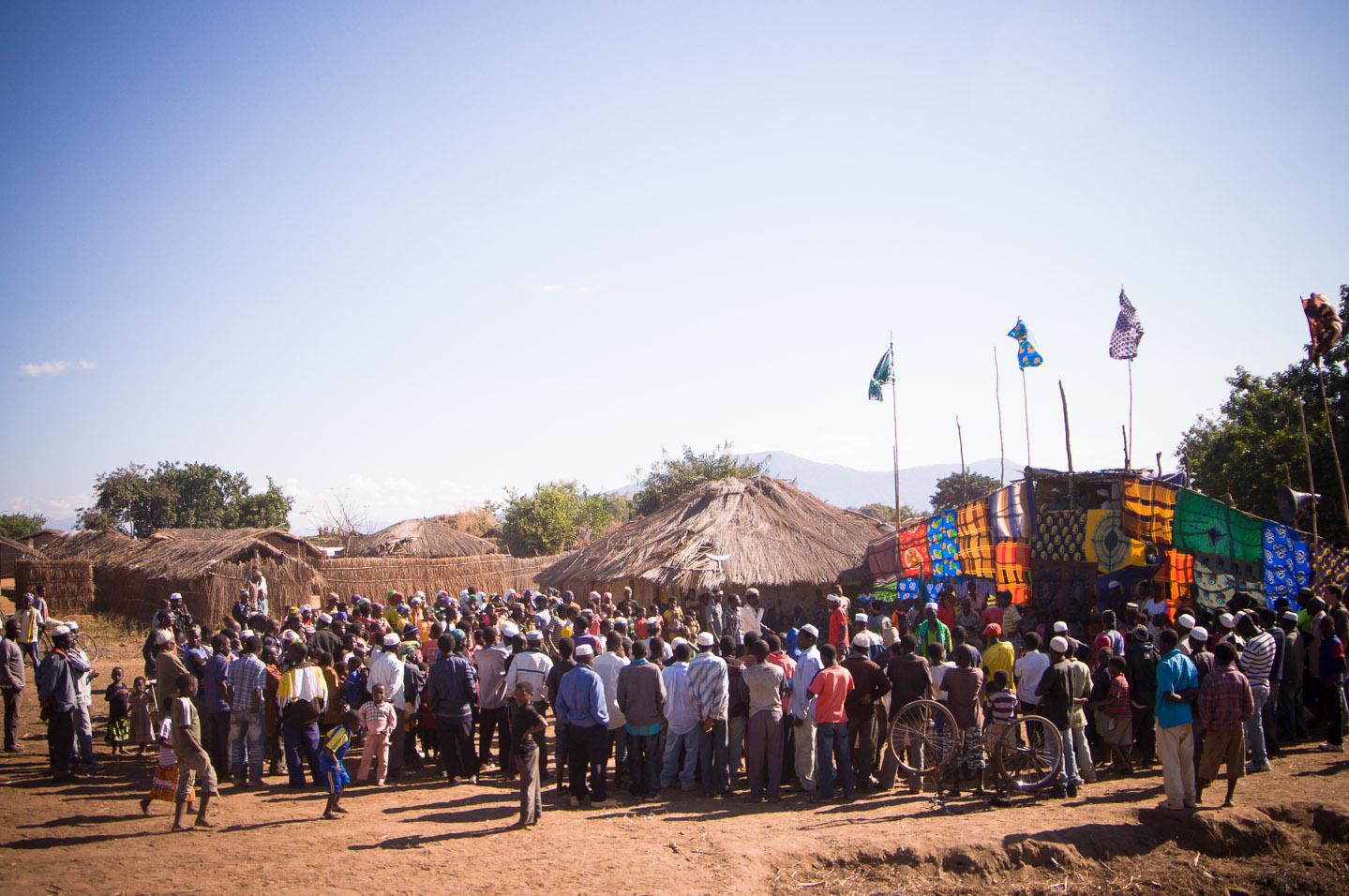

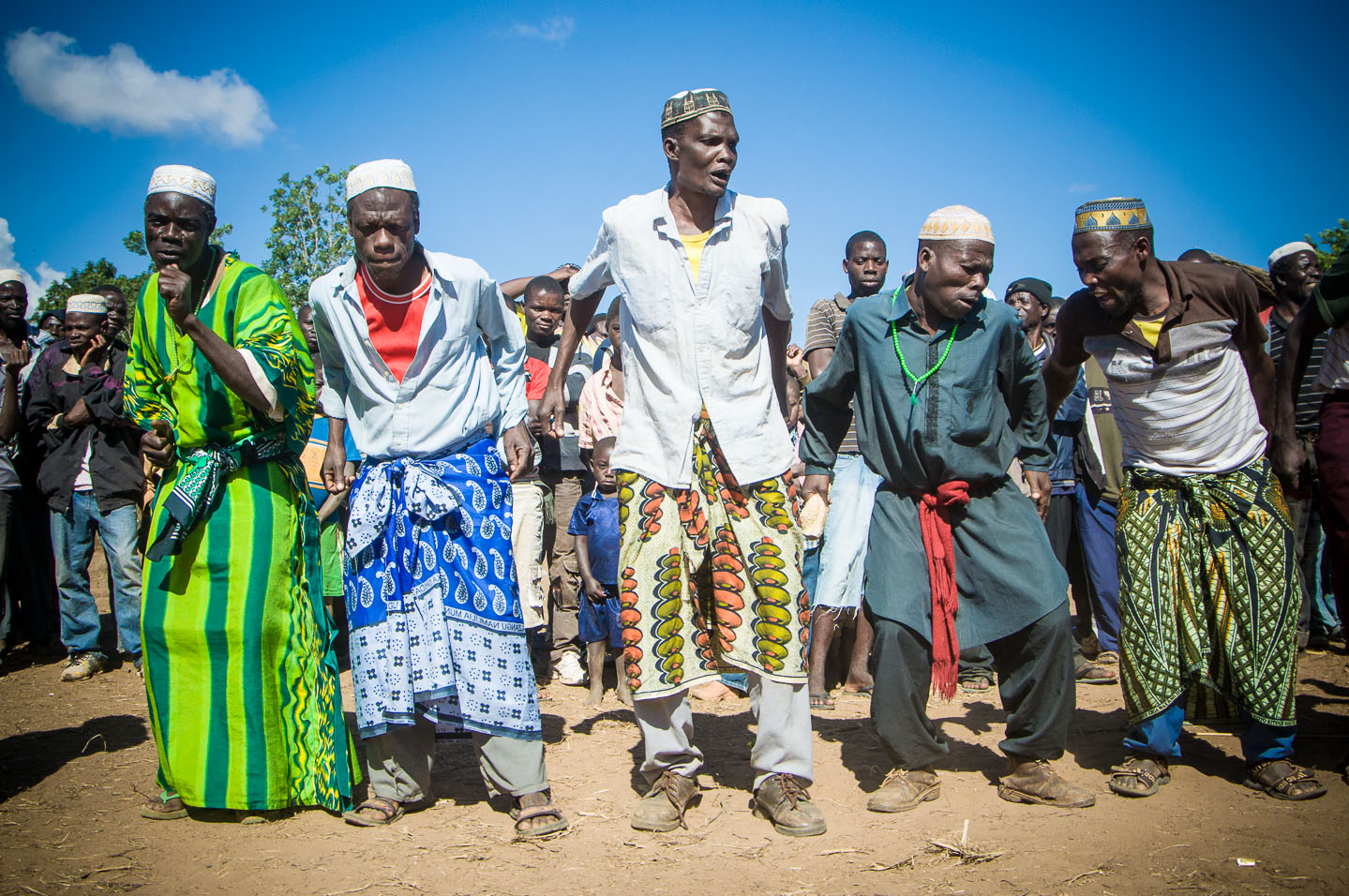

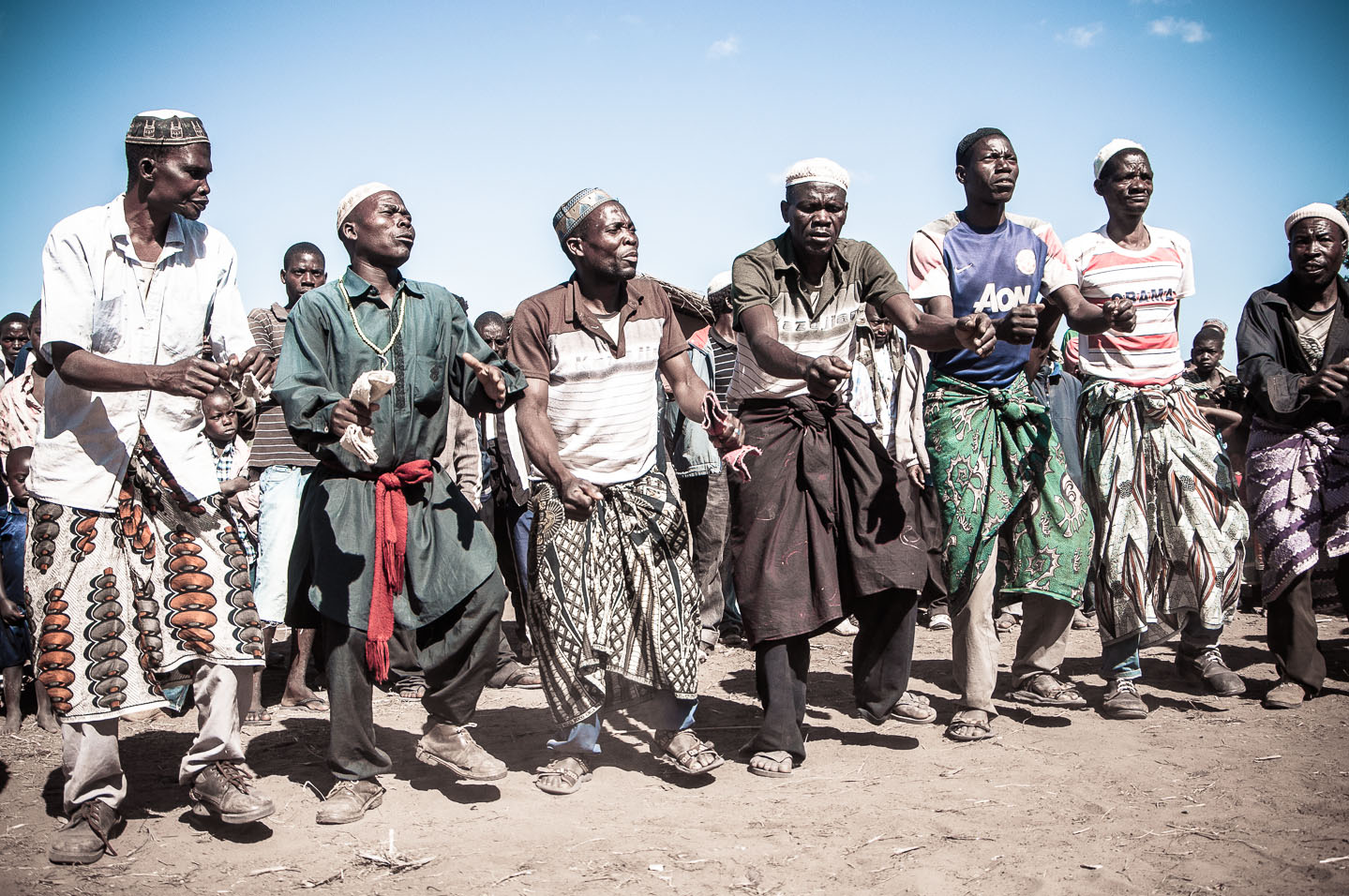

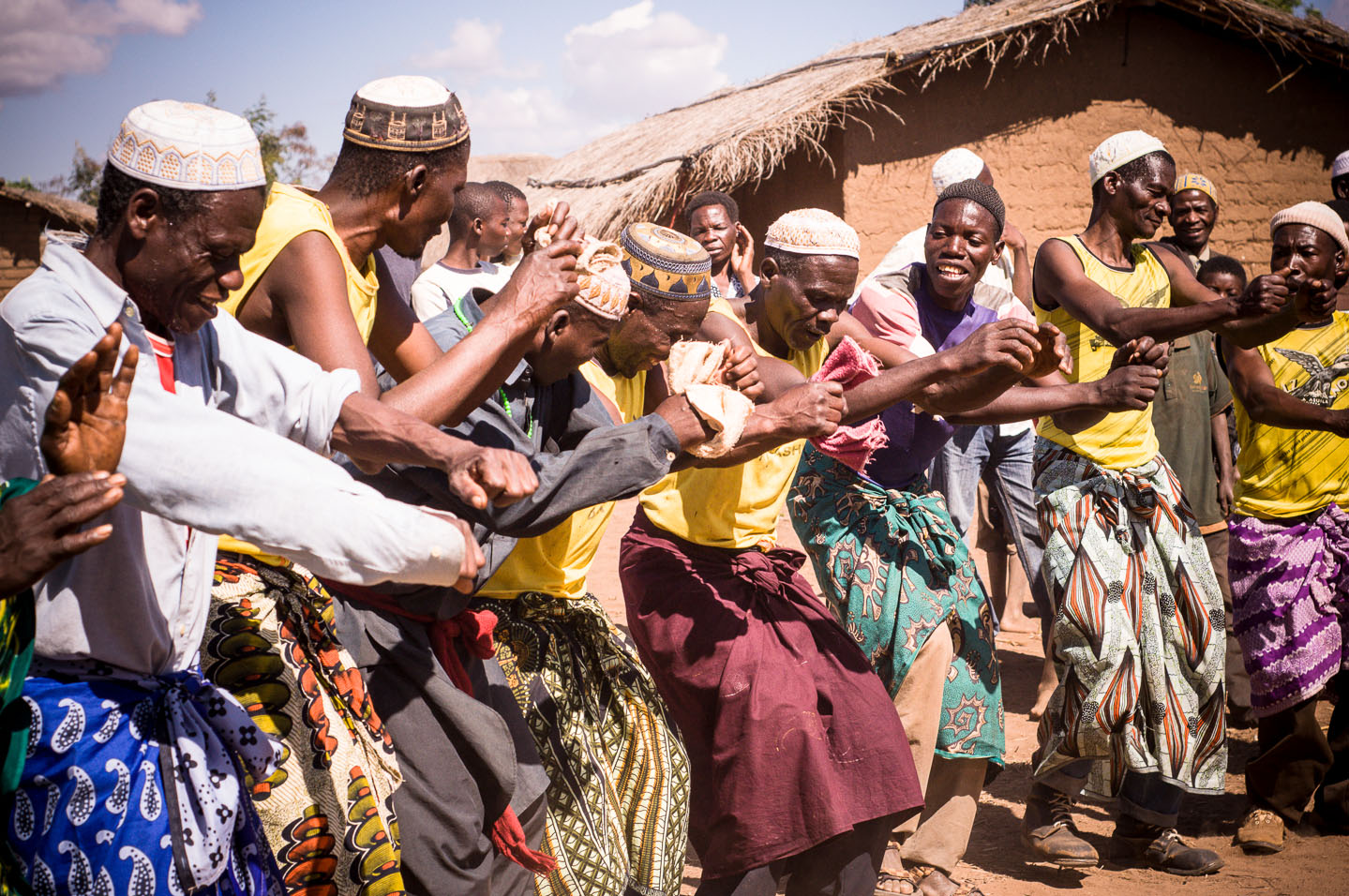

=== Singenge ===
The Singenge is a dance performed by young girls during the time of unyago (initiation).

==== Yao Singenge dance in Chanika, Mandimba, Niassa, Mozambique 2013 ====
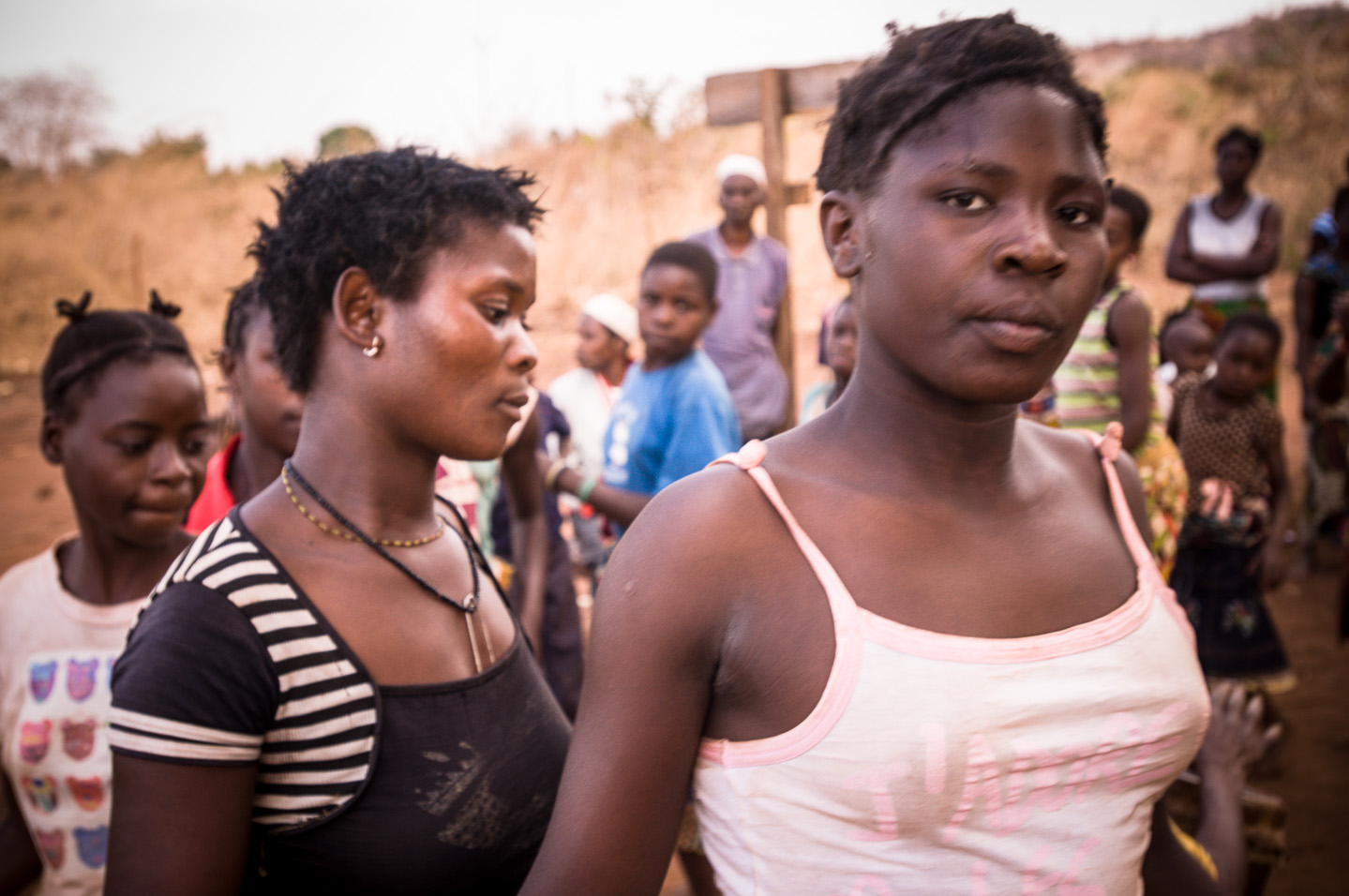

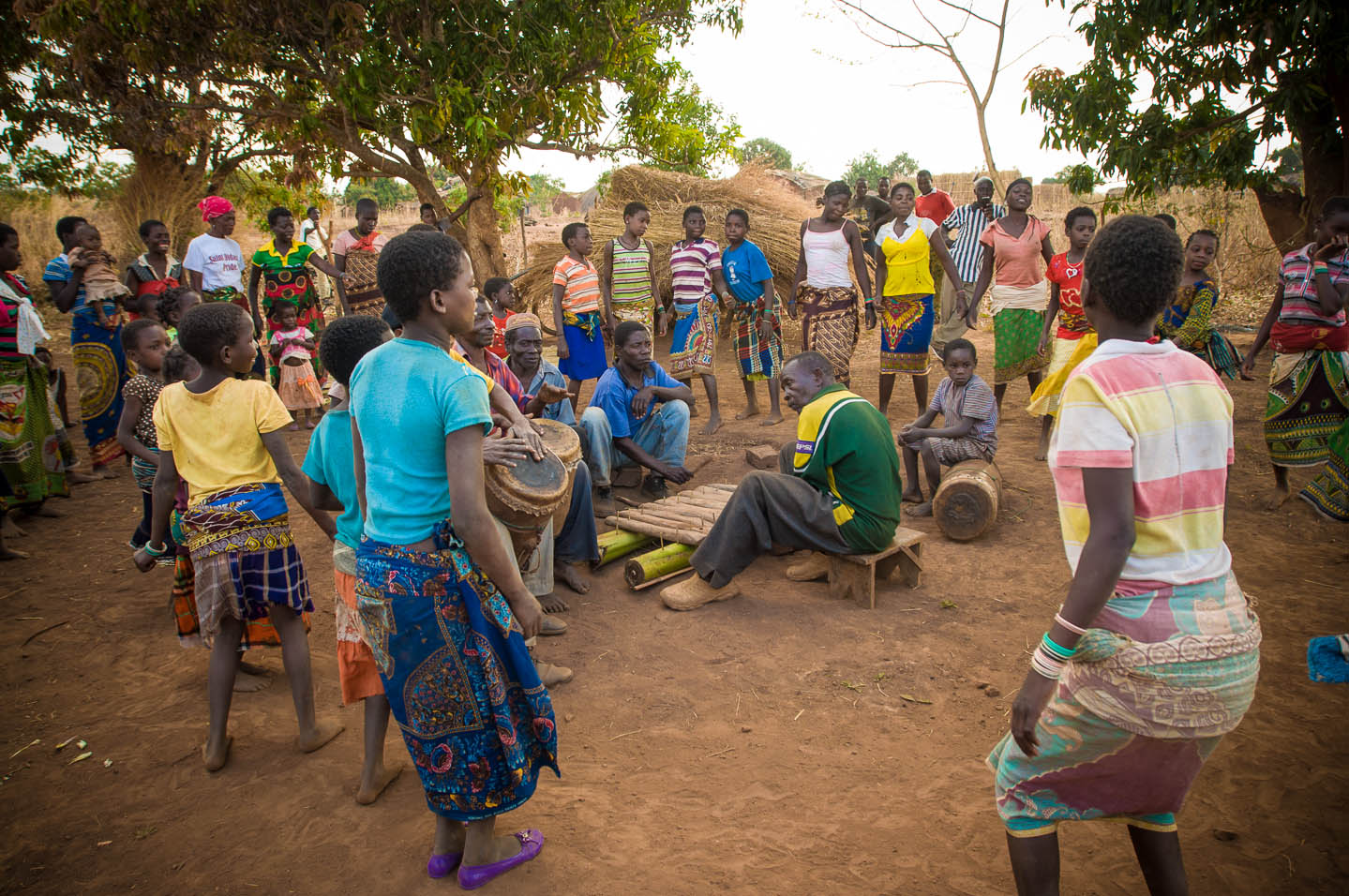

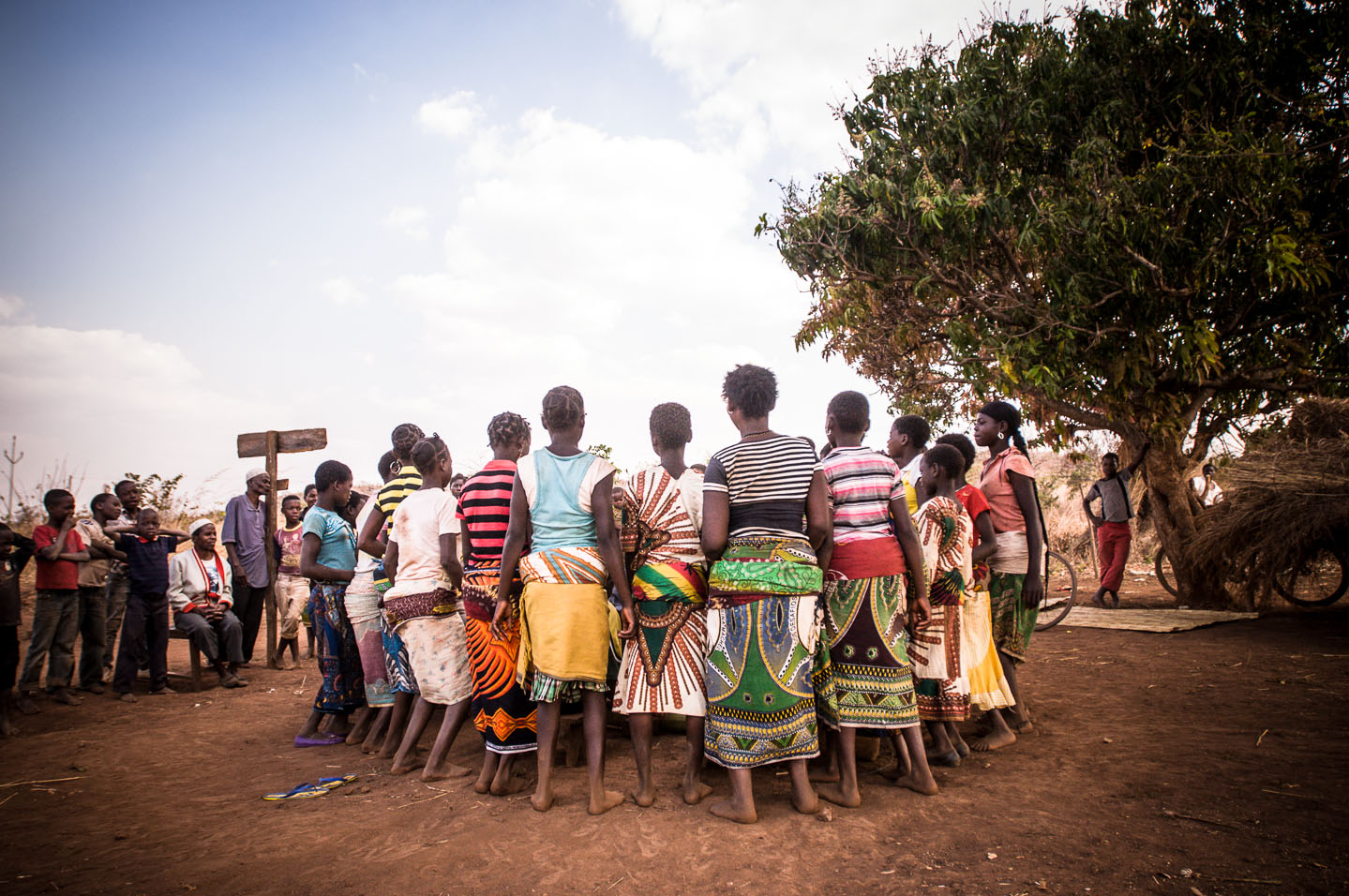

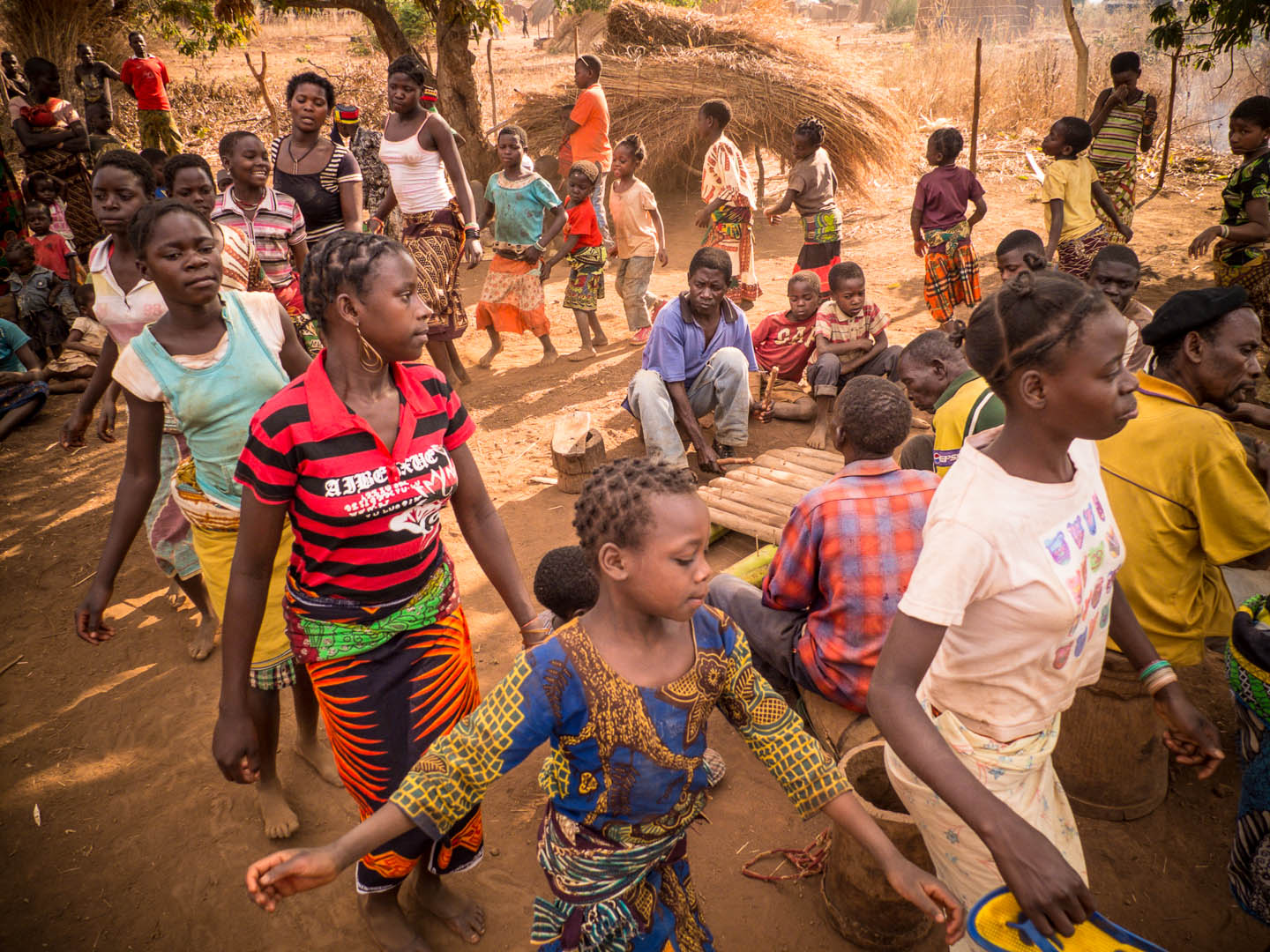

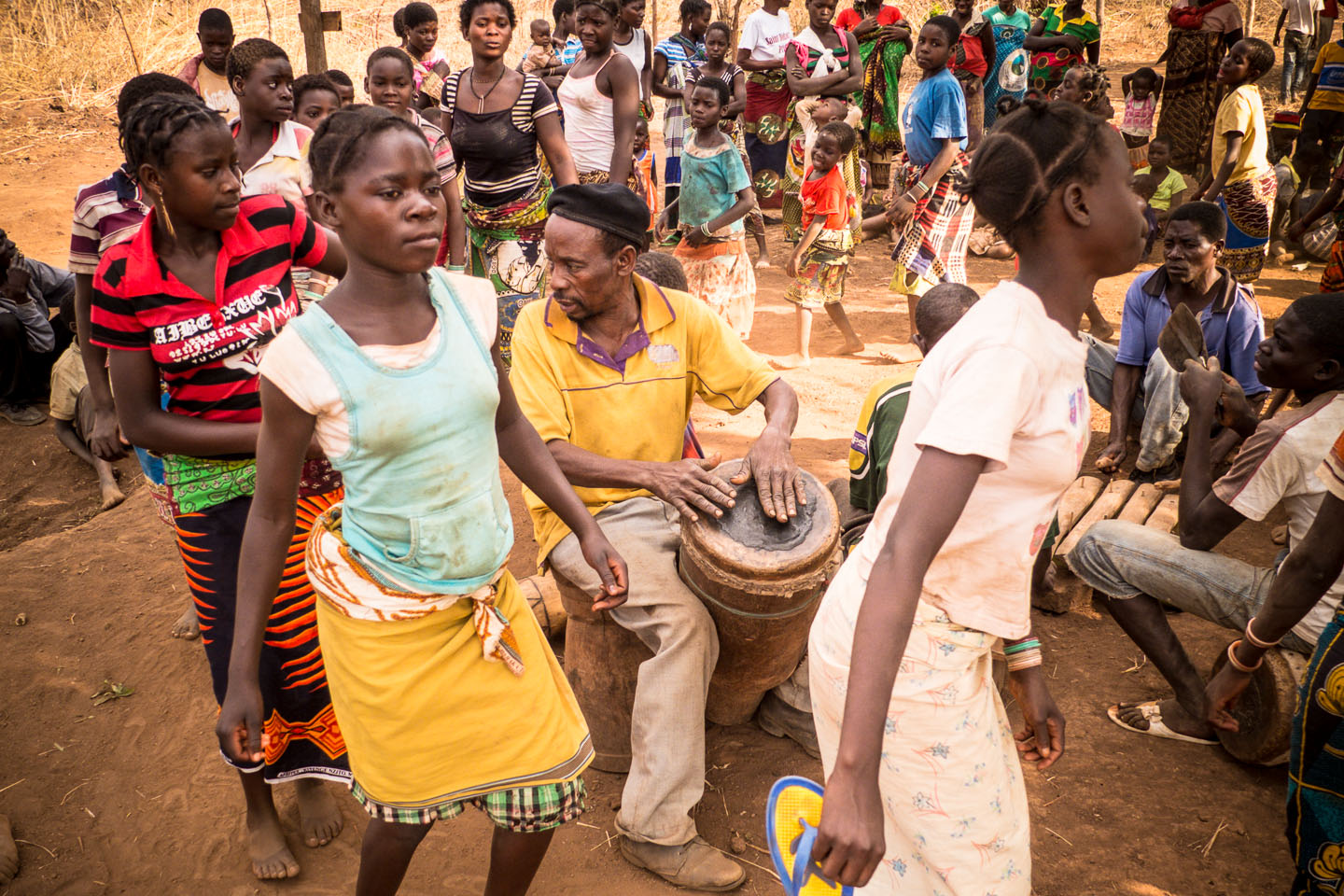

=== Zimbabwe ===
The Zimbabwe is one of the dances for a large group seen during the end of unyago festivities.
