= Mandimba =

Town in north-western Mozambique

Coordinates: 14.353°S 35.651°E

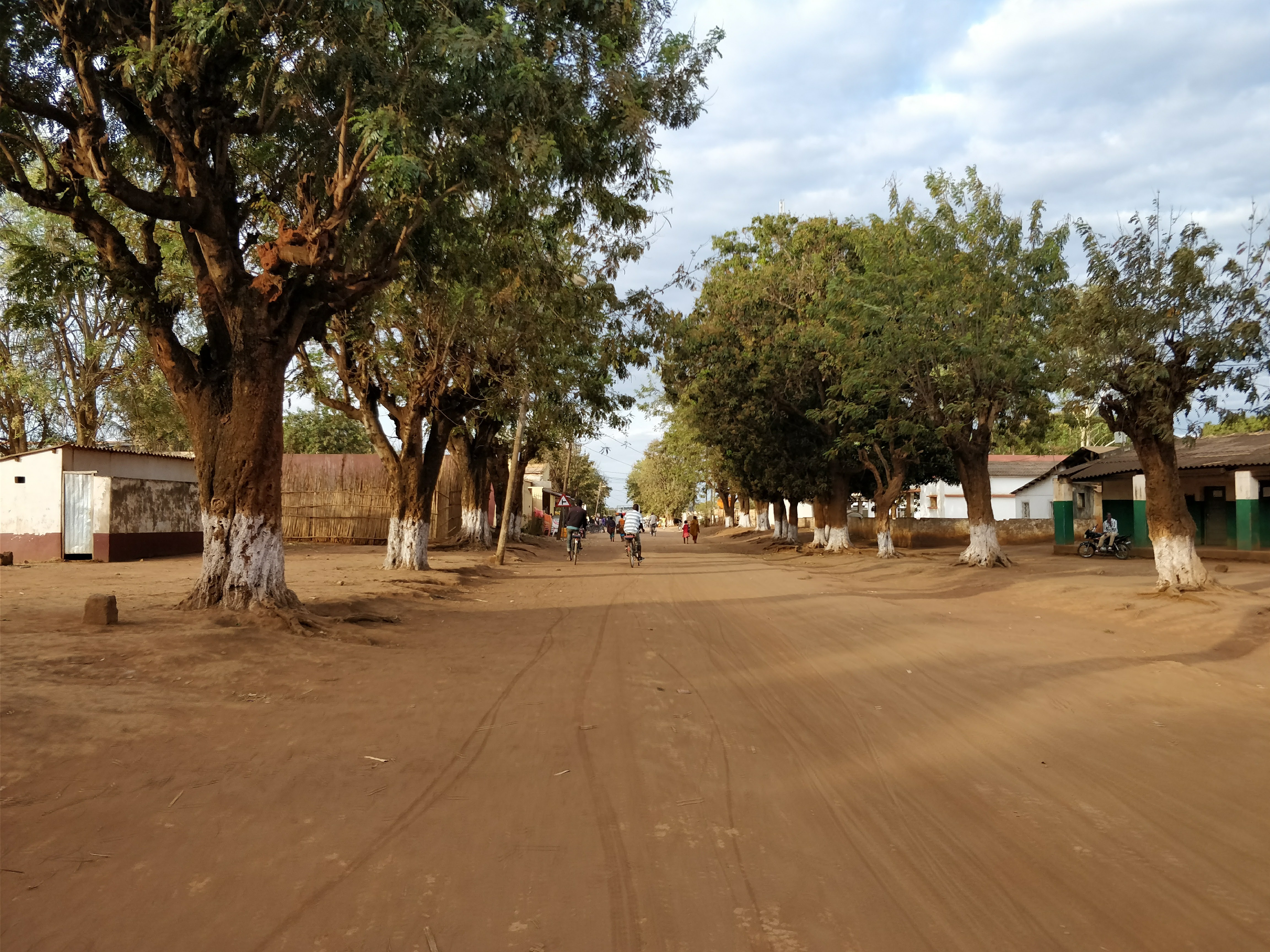
A street in Mandimba, Niassa, Mozambique

Mandimba is the principal town of Mandimba District in Niassa Province in north-western Mozambique.
