= Mandimba District =

Coordinates: 14.360°S 35.655°E

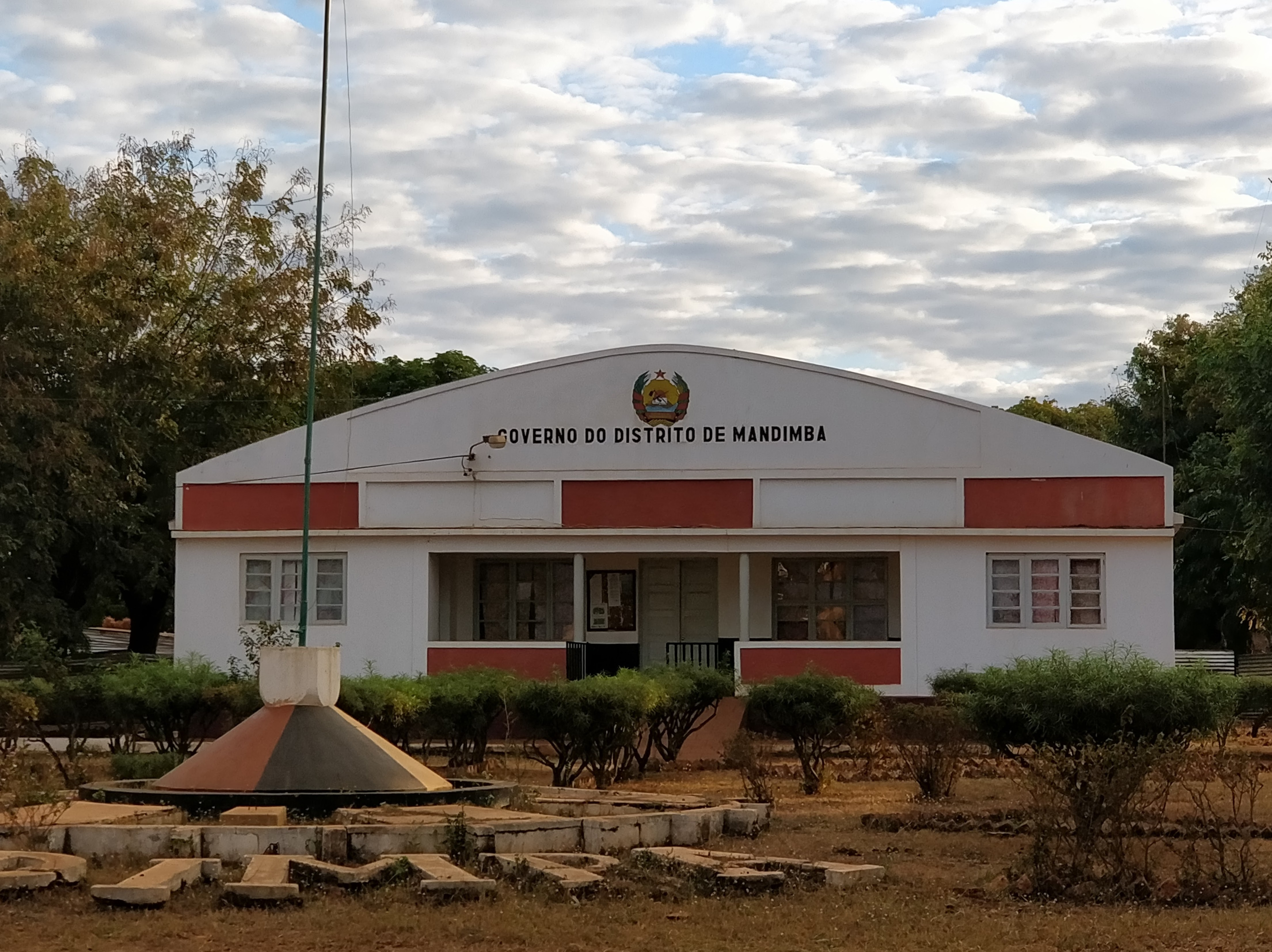
Seat of the district government of Mandimba

Mandimba district in Mozambique

Mandimba District is a district of Niassa Province in north-western Mozambique. The principal town is Mandimba.
