= Batz =

Batz or Bätz may refer to:

== People ==
=== Batz ===
- Charles de Batz-Castelmore d'Artagnan (c. 1611 - 1673), famous French Musketeer of the Guard
- Jean Pierre de Batz, Baron de Sainte-Croix (1754-1822), also known as Baron de Batz, French Royalist who attempted to restore the French monarchy
- Philipp Mainländer, born Philipp Batz (1841–1876), German poet and philosopher
- Wilhelm Batz (1916–1988), German World War II fighter pilot

=== Bätz ===
- Johann Heinrich Hartmann Bätz (1709–1770), Dutch organ builder
- Johanna Maria Bätz (18th century), Dutch organ builder

== Music ==
- Guana Batz, an English psychobilly band

== Places ==
- Batz-sur-Mer, a French commune of the Loire-Atlantique department
- Île de Batz, a French island off Roscoff in Brittany
