= Johanna Maria Bätz =

Dutch organ builder (18th century)

Johanna Maria Bätz (née Liepoldes)
- Occupation: Organ Builder
- Spouse: Johann Heinrich Hartmann Bätz (m. 1750)
- Children: 2

Johanna Maria Bätz (née Liepoldes) was a Dutch organ builder and harpsichord maker, active in the mid 18th century.

== Life ==
Bätz was the wife of Johann Heinrich Hartmann Bätz. They were married on 17 January 1750, in Utrecht, Netherlands.

After the death of her husband in 1770, Bätz announced that she would ensure that his company continued making and repairing organs and harpsichords. Her role in the business remains uncertain.
