= Christian Müller (organ builder) =

Dutch organ builder (1690–1763)

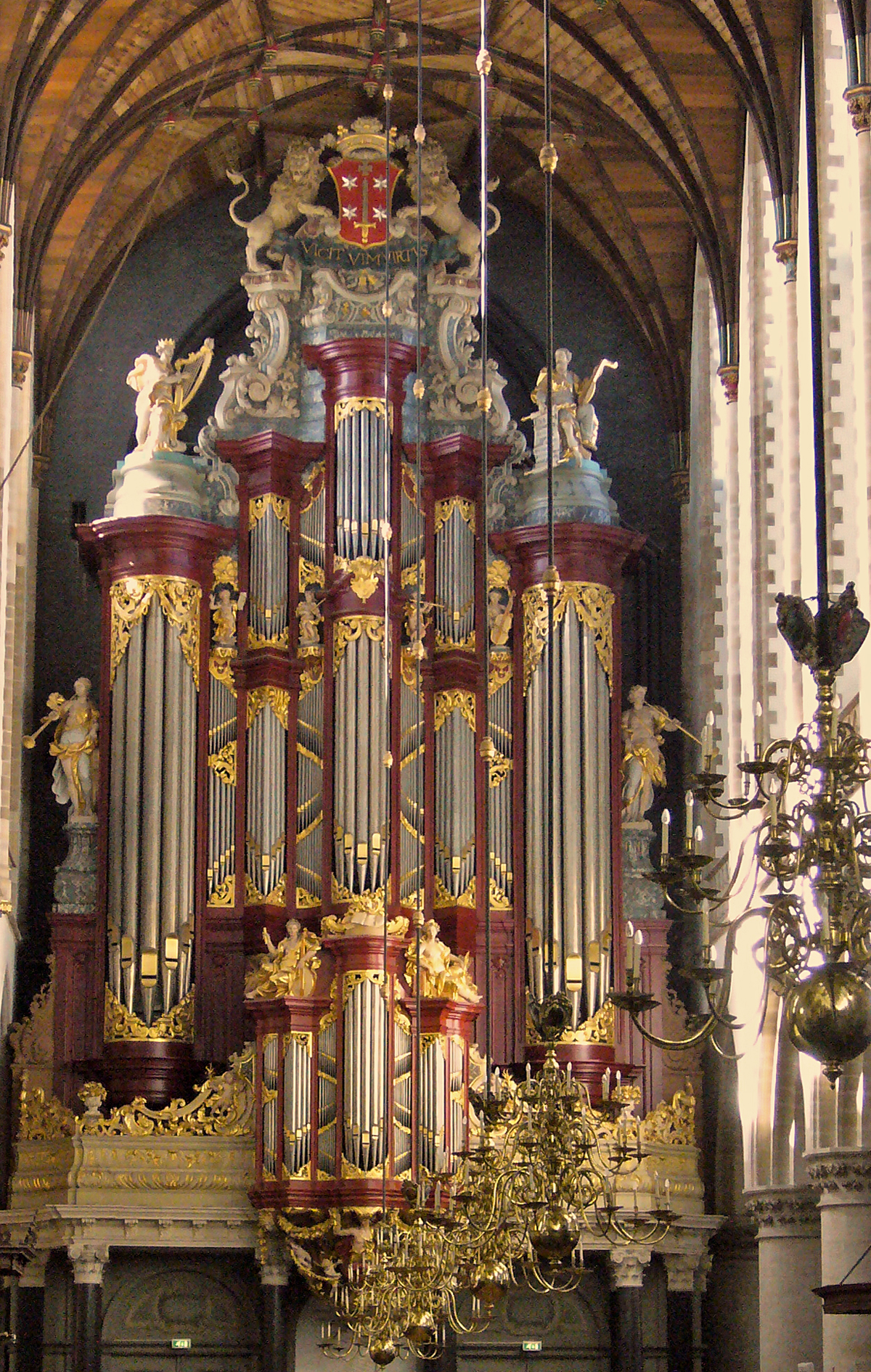
The organ in the Grote Kerk, Haarlem (1735–38).

Christian Müller (spelled also Christiaan; Sankt Andreasberg, 4 February 1690 - Amsterdam, 8 March 1763) was a Dutch organ builder, born in the Lower Saxony part of Germany. He is renowned for building the great organ in the Grote Kerk, Haarlem, which at the time was deemed as the largest organ in the world; its reputation has been amplified by the fact that several composers have performed on it over the centuries, including Georg Friedrich Handel and Wolfgang Amadeus Mozart.

Around 1720 Christian Müller moved to Amsterdam, where he became an apprentice in the workshop of organ builder Cornelis Hoornbeeck. Following the master's death in 1722 Müller took over the establishment, where his nephew Johann Caspar Müller (1697–1746) was employed until 1729. The latter is mostly noted for rebuilding the Christian Vater organ in the Oude Kerk of Amsterdam in 1738.

Apart from the famous 60-stop in Haarlem (1735–38), Müller is noted for a number of instruments found in many Dutch towns. Standing out among them are: the 1727 Grote or Jacobijnerkerk organ in Leeuwarden (three manuals, 37 stops); the 1734 Oude Waalse kerk organ in Amsterdam; the 1737 Lutheran church organ in Zaandam; the 1756 organ in Beverwijk; and the 1762 Koepelkerk organ in Alkmaar. A number of smaller instruments, used both in churches as well as domestic households, have been attributed to Christian Müller, the majority of which survive to this day.

After the death of Christian Müller in 1763 the workshop was taken on by his apprentice Johann Heinrich Hartmann Bätz (1709–70) along with the master's son Pieter (1738 – c.1789); aside from organs the workshop also produced harpsichords.
