= Gunhild Kristensen =

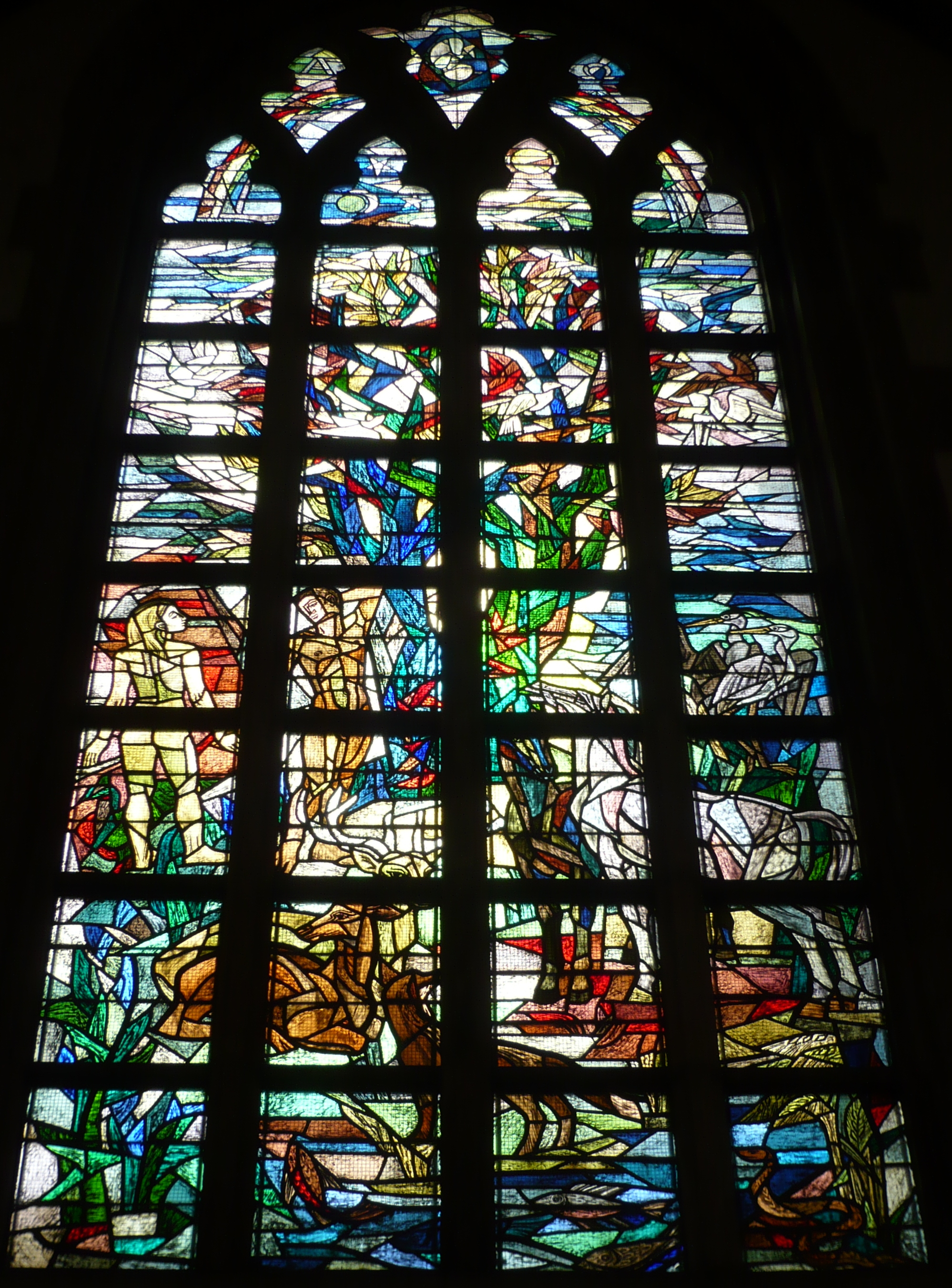
- Window in Haarlem
- Born: 6 April 1919; Leiden
- Died: 21 January 2002 (aged 82); Oosterbeek

Gunhild Volkenborn-Kristensen (1919–2002) was a glazier, mosaic artist, painter and textile artist from the Netherlands. She was born in Leiden to William Brede Kristensen, a Norwegian church historian, and Jacoba Heldring.

== Works ==
Kristensen's first commission for stained glass was in 1957 for a window in St. Bavo's Church in Haarlem.

Kristensen designed three windows for St. Lawrence's Church in Rotterdam, but only one was actually made. Having found out that the church council preferred a male artist, she rejected the assignment for the remaining windows. In 2014 the church decided to commission the other two windows, the designs of which had been preserved.
