= Oosterkerk, Hoorn =

Historic church building in Hoorn, North Holland, Netherlands

Oosterkerk
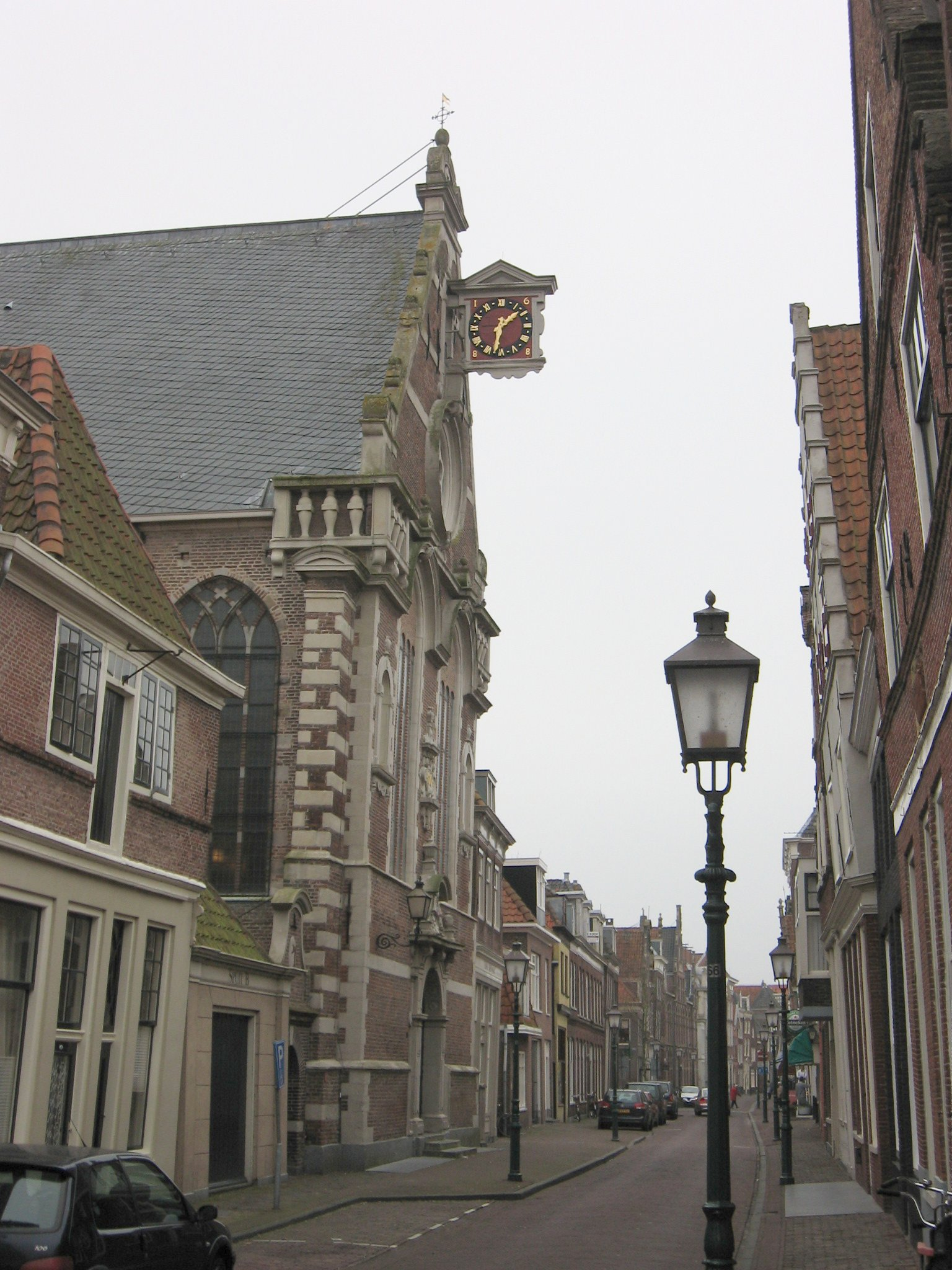
- Front facade of Oosterkerk

Religion
- Region: North Holland
- Leadership: Dick van der Pijl
- Year consecrated: 1616

Location
- Location: Grote Oost 60, 1621 BX te Hoorn, Netherlands
- State: Netherlands
- Interactive map of Oosterkerk
- Coordinates: 52.639579°N 5.063345°E

Architecture
- Type: Church
- Style: Gothic
- Groundbreaking: 1519
- Completed: 1616
- Rijksmonument
- Official name: Oosterkerk
- Designated: 1965
- Reference no.: 22399

Website
- oosterkerkhoorn.nl

Oosterkerk (Eastern Church) or St. Anthony Church is a former Dutch Reformed Church in Hoorn, North Holland in the Netherlands. The church is a Rijksmonument and was designed in the Gothic style. The church's origins date back to 1450. The building that exists today was complete in 1616. Today, the church is a cultural center.

== History ==
Oosterkerk was built in 1616. The church was originally Roman Catholic and was used primarily by fishermen and skippers. After the Reformation it became a Dutch Reformed Church. The church has stained glass windows, which underwent restorations in 1982.

The church's organ was built in 1764 by Johann Heinrich Hartmann Bätz. It is the only organ he built in North Holland. The organ is located on the west wall of the church and replaced an older organ from the 15th- and 16th-centuries. Bätz's organ stopped working in 1869. A new organ was built in 1871. It worked until 1960. Around that time, the church was decommissioned by the Dutch Reformed Church.

After decommissioning, the Oosterkerk Foundation took over management of the building. The organ was restored in 1982 by Vermeulen Alkmaar.
