= Johann Heinrich Hartmann Bätz =

Dutch organ builder (1709–1770)

Johann Heinrich Hartmann Bätz (1 January 1709 – 13 December 1770) was a Dutch organ builder.

== Life ==
Bätz was born in Frankenroda (Thuringia). He learned the organ-building profession in Gotha under the auspices of Christoph Thielemann. He came to Holland in 1733 where he probably first worked for Christiaan Müller, builder of the organ in the Sint-Bavokerk in Haarlem. In 1739 he set up his own firm in Utrecht. His instruments were considered stupendous, commanding the admiration of every one who hears, and even sees them. The organ of Zierikzee, which was built in 1770, had 56 voices and 3108 pipes. Bätz was paid 19,500 florins for this organ, which burned down in 1832. He erected other organs of similar magnitude in the large churches of Gorinchem, Utrecht, Woerden, Benschop, etc. He died in Utrecht. His sons Gideon (1751-1820) and Christoffel (1755-1800), who lived their entire life in Utrecht, succeeded their father in the business.

== Company ==
After Johann Heinrich Hartmann Bätz died, his family kept the company alive. His son Gideon Thomas (1751-1820) took over the company in 1772. Christoffel, brother to Gideon Thomas, kept working with his brother, although he had his own organ building company. The sons of Christoffel, Jonathan and Johan Martin, succeeded their father in 1820. In 1849 Christian Gottlieb Friedrich Witte took over the company; he had been working with the Bätz family since 1827.

== Notable organs ==
Some notable organs build by the Bätz family:

- Amsterdam, Lutherse Kerk 49-III/P
- Delft, Nieuwe Kerk 47-III/P
- Gorinchem, Grote Kerk. (Organ rebuild by Witte in 1853)
- Den Haag, Lutherse Kerk 39-III/P
- Maassluis, Grote Kerk 42-III/P
- Utrecht, Domkerk 50-III/P
- Zeist, Oude Kerk 23-II/P

== See also ==
- Oosterkerk
