= Grote Kerk, Haarlem =

Grote St.-Bavokerk
- The Church of Saint Bavo
- Grote Kerk
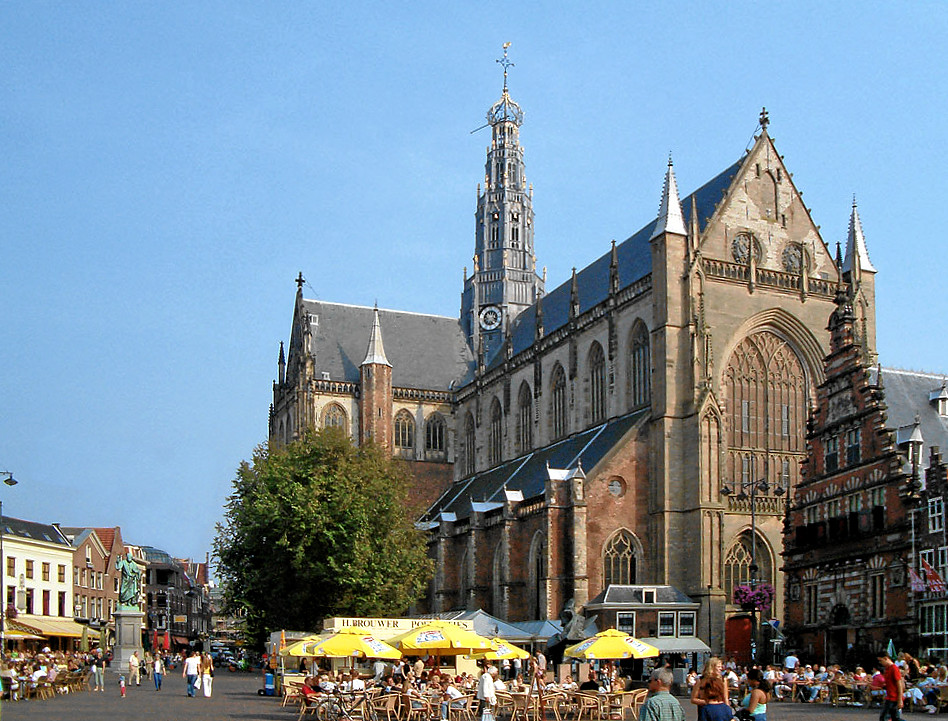
- The Grote Markt in Haarlem with the Sint-Bavokerk. On the left the statue of Laurens Janszoon Coster can be seen; on the right is the Vleeshal.
- Grote St.-Bavokerk
- 52°22′52″N 4°38′16″E
- Location: Haarlem
- Country: Netherlands
- Denomination: Protestant Church in the Netherlands
- Previous denomination: Roman Catholic
- Tradition: Reformed
- Website: www.bavo.nl/en/

History
- Former name: The Cathedral of St Bavo
- Status: Active
- Founded: 1245 (first mention)
- Dedication: Saint Bavo

Architecture
- Functional status: Parish church
- Architectural type: Basilica
- Style: Gothic
- Years built: 16th century

Administration
- Parish: Haarlem

The Grote Kerk or St.-Bavokerk is a Reformed Protestant church located on the central market square (Grote Markt) in the Dutch city of Haarlem.

The church was built in 1307. Prior to the Reformation, Grote Kerk was a Catholic cathedral after which it adopted the Reformed faith; at present, another Haarlem church called the Cathedral of Saint Bavo now serves as the main cathedral for the Roman Catholic Diocese of Haarlem-Amsterdam.

== History ==
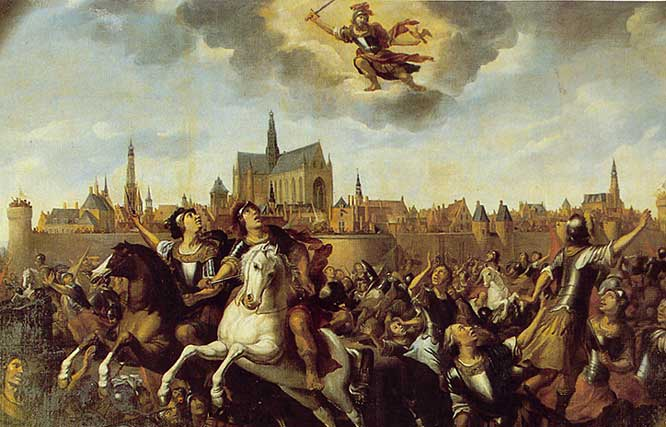
Saint Bavo saves Haarlem from the Kennemers. Dated 1673 but showing legend from 1274. Now in the collection of the Catholic Cathedral of Saint Bavo, also in Haarlem.

This church is an important landmark for the city of Haarlem and has dominated the city skyline for centuries. It is built in the Gothic style of architecture, and it became the main church of Haarlem after renovations in the 15th century made it significantly larger than the Janskerk (Haarlem). First mention of a church on this spot was made in 1307, but the wooden structure burned in the 14th century. The church was rebuilt and promoted to chapter church in 1479 and only became a cathedral in 1559. The main architects were Godevaert de Bosscher and Steven van Afflighem (nave), and Evert van Antwerpen (transept). The term "cathedral" was never really associated with this church, since it was only consecrated as a cathedral in 1559, which was already in the middle of the period known as the Protestant Reformation. The church was confiscated only 19 years later during the Haarlemse noon in 1578, when it was converted to Protestantism. It was dedicated to Saint Bavo at some time before 1500, though there exists a curious painting in the collection of the Catholic Cathedral of St. Bavo illustrating the miracle of St. Bavo saving Haarlem from the Kennemers in a scene from the 13th century. This painting was painted a century after the Catholics were banned from their church, and may have been a commemorative painting referring to the defense of the Church and the Catholic faith as well as the defense of the city.

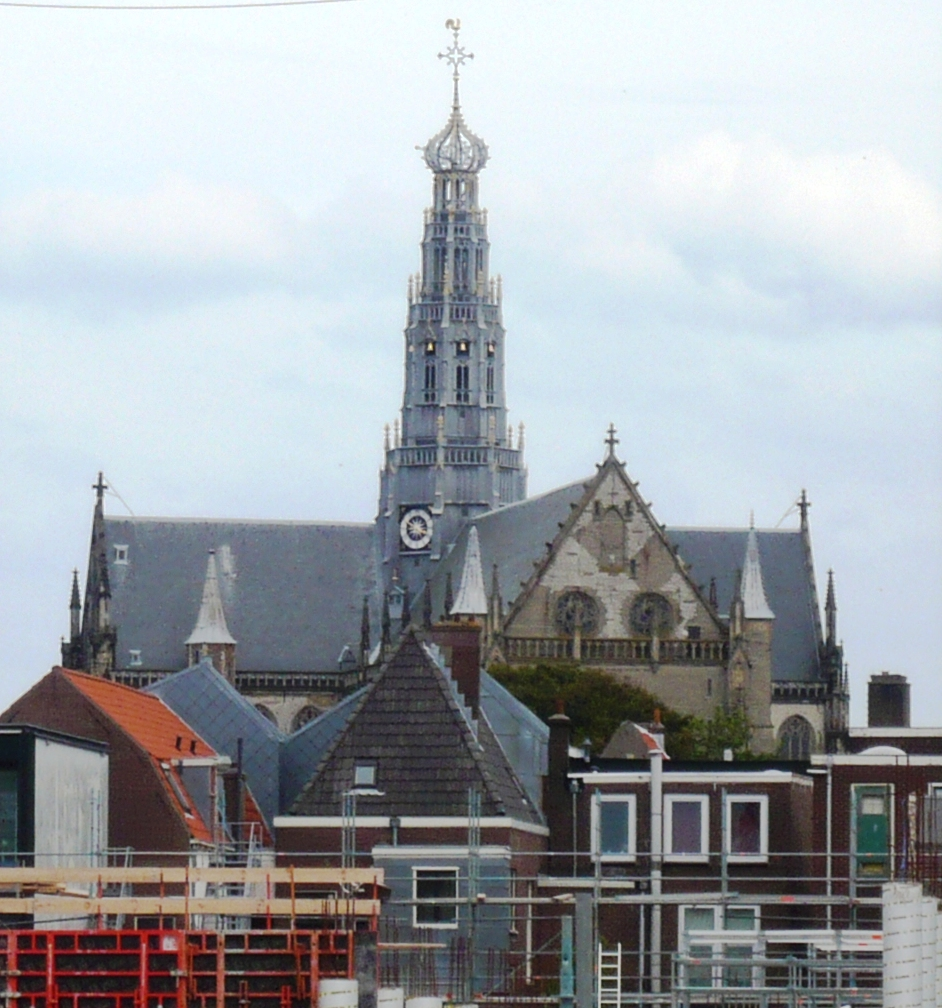
View of the church from the west

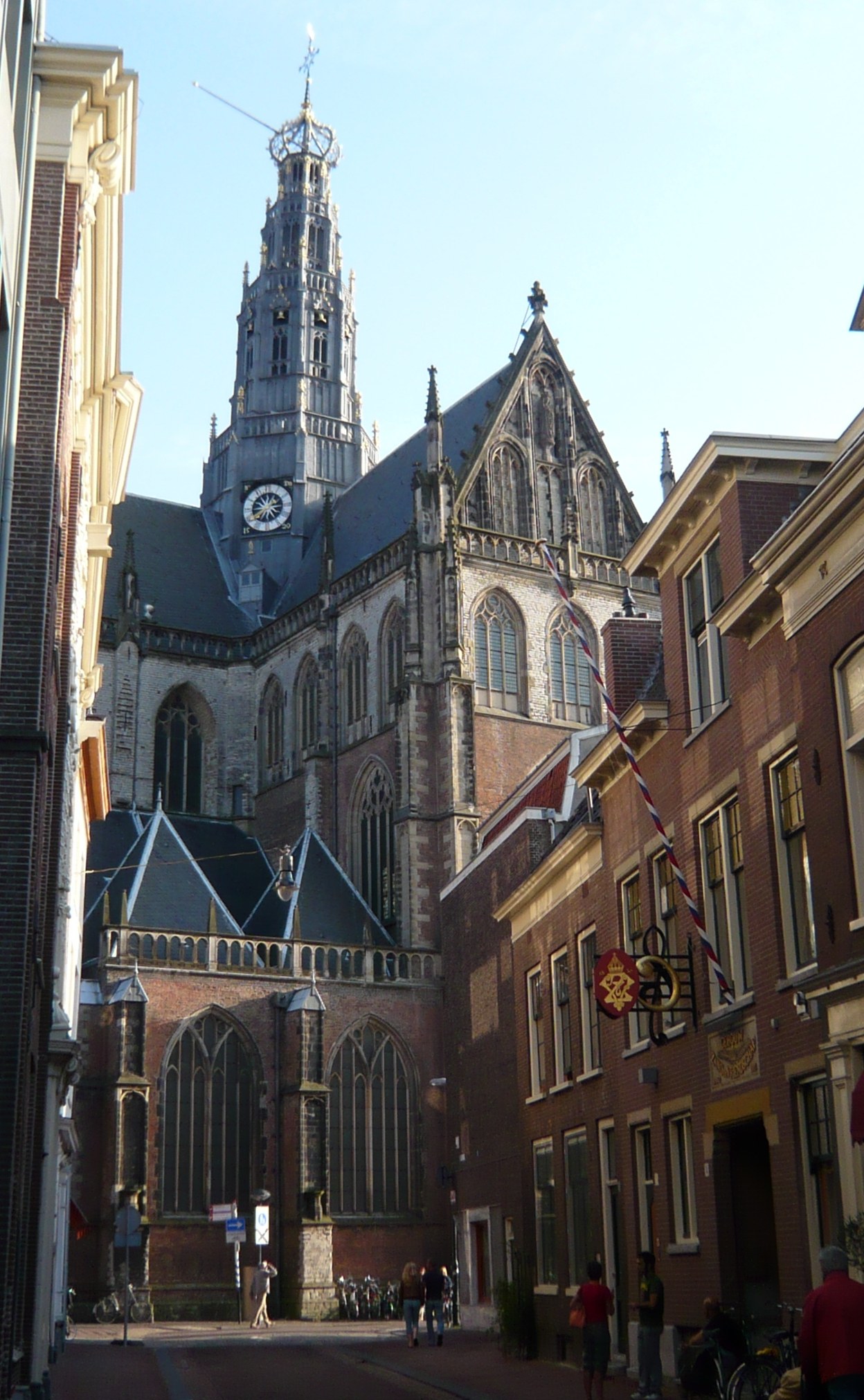
View of the church from the north (Jansstraat)

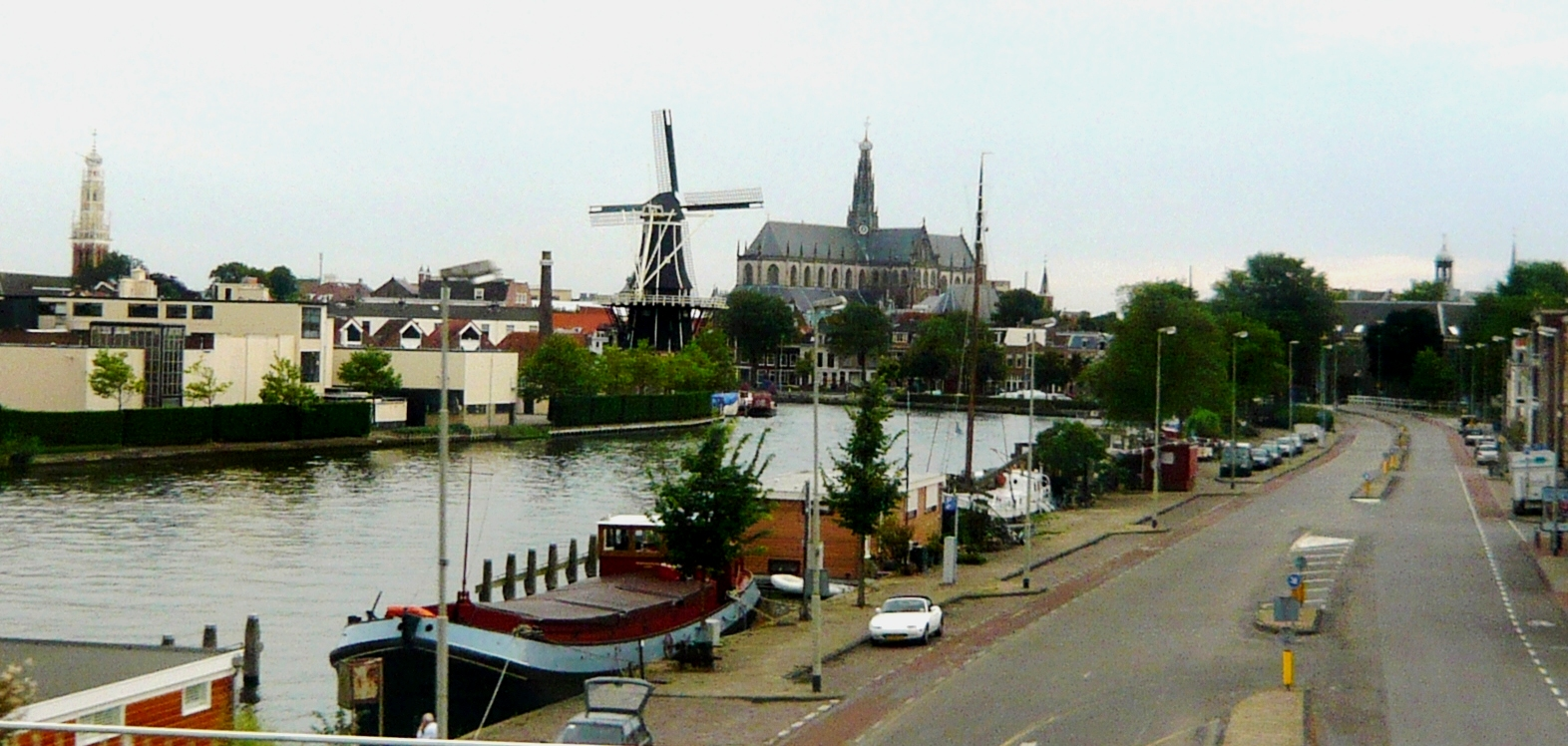
View of the church over the Spaarne river from the North (taken from the train)

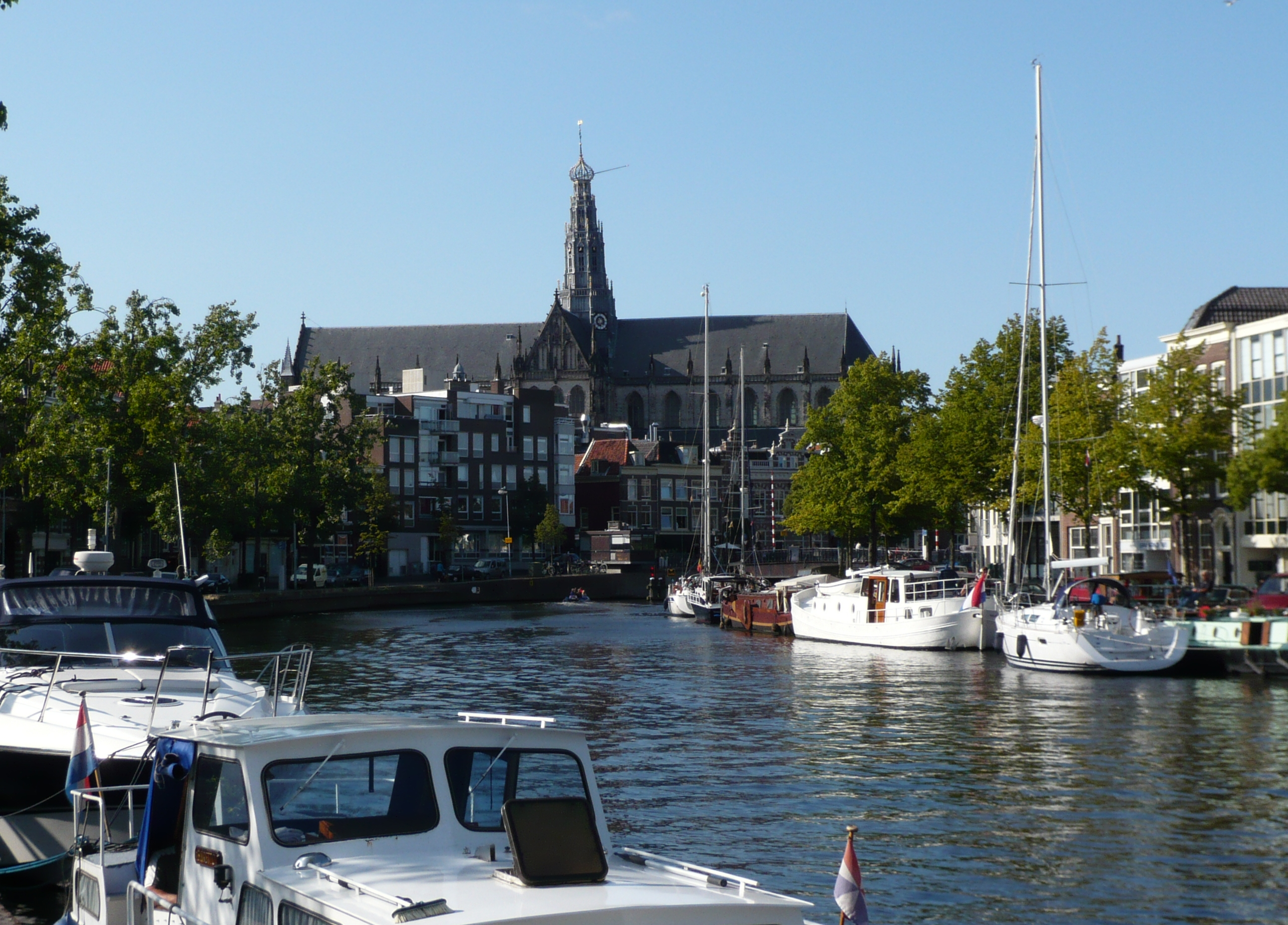
View of the church from the south

=== Christianity in Haarlem ===
Haarlem has had a Christian parish church since the 9th century. This first church was a "daughter church" of Velsen, which itself was founded in 695 by St. Willibrord. This early first church was a wooden church on the same site as the Grote Kerk. Extensions and expansions over the centuries led to its formal consecration in 1559 when the first bishop Nicolaas van Nieuwland was appointed. Only 19 years later, after the Spanish occupation ended (they won the Siege of Haarlem) and Haarlem reverted to the Protestant House of Orange, the church was confiscated during the episode known as the Haarlemse noon and converted to Protestantism as part of the Protestant Reformation.

At this time most of the art and silver artefacts were also seized and what was not sold or destroyed has survived in the Haarlem municipal collection, which is now in the collection of the Frans Hals Museum. The Haarlem Catholics took what they could carry with them and went underground, meeting thereafter in various schuilkerken, the most prominent ones known as the St. Franciscus statie and the St. Josephs statie. Eventually, the St. Josephstatie built a new church across from the Janskerk called the St. Josephkerk, and this church, after growing and becoming a cathedral again, built a new cathedral on the Leidsevaart in the 19th century. Since the building of this new Cathedral of St. Bavo, there has been much confusion about the name of the Bavochurch, since as a Protestant church it is not even dedicated to Saint Bavo. For this reason it is officially called Grote Kerk, which just means "Big Church".

=== Fires ===
On 22 May 1801 there was a fire caused by lightning which struck the tower. Another disaster was prevented in 1839 by Martijn Hendrik Kretschman, the guard of the tower. He stopped Jan Drost who worked for the church. Drost had tried to set fire to the pipe organ and piano by throwing hot coals on top of it. Drost committed suicide and he was buried in the tower.

In the church was a high sentry box reserved for fire-watchers. If they saw a fire in the city then they would signal using red flags so that the guards in the main guard house opposite could react. This sentry position was still in use in 1919.

In the renovation of the 1930s an automatic sprinkler system was installed in the tower, that could extinguish a fire 70m high in the tower.

== Exterior ==
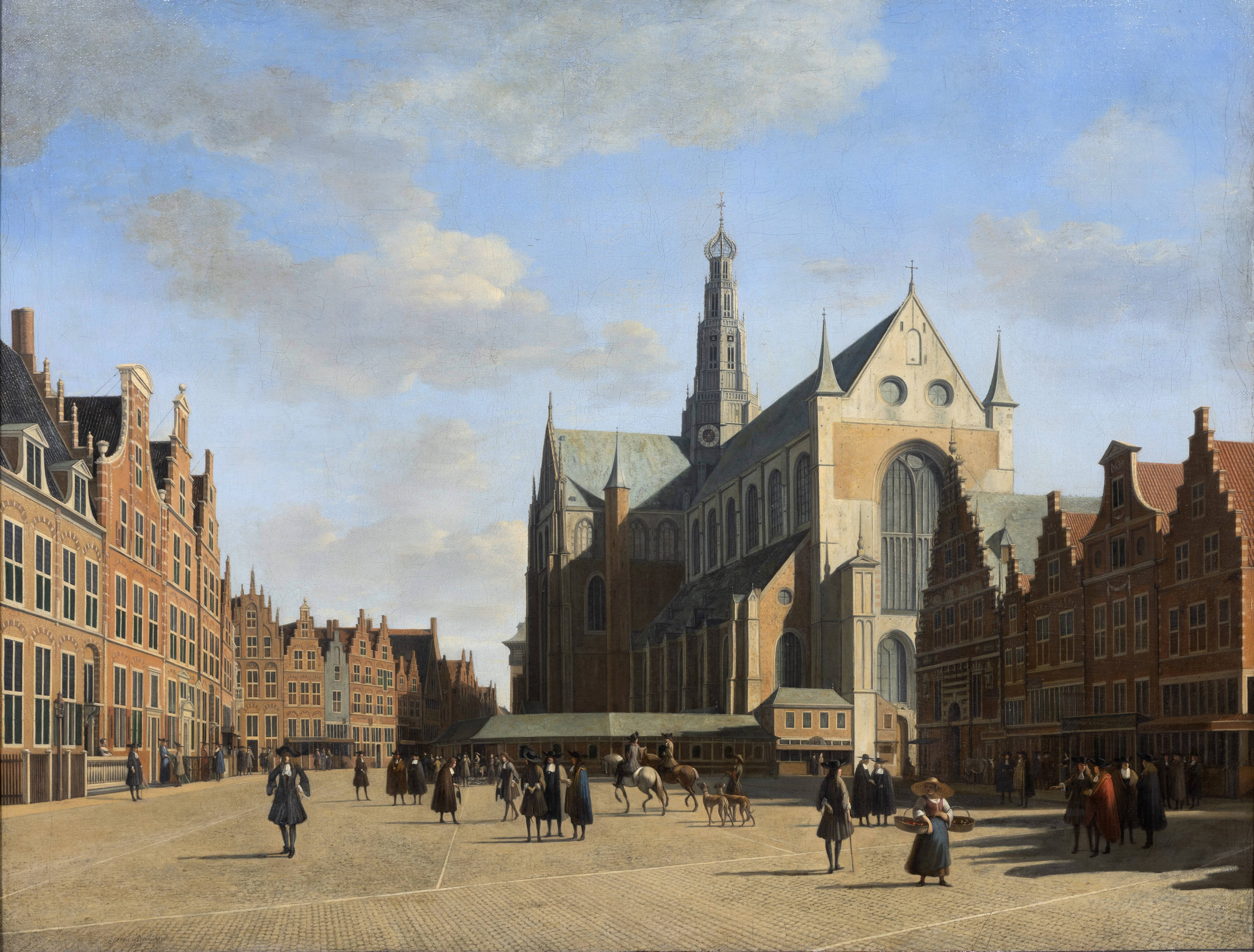
The northern side in 1696, painting by Gerrit Adriaenszoon Berckheyde

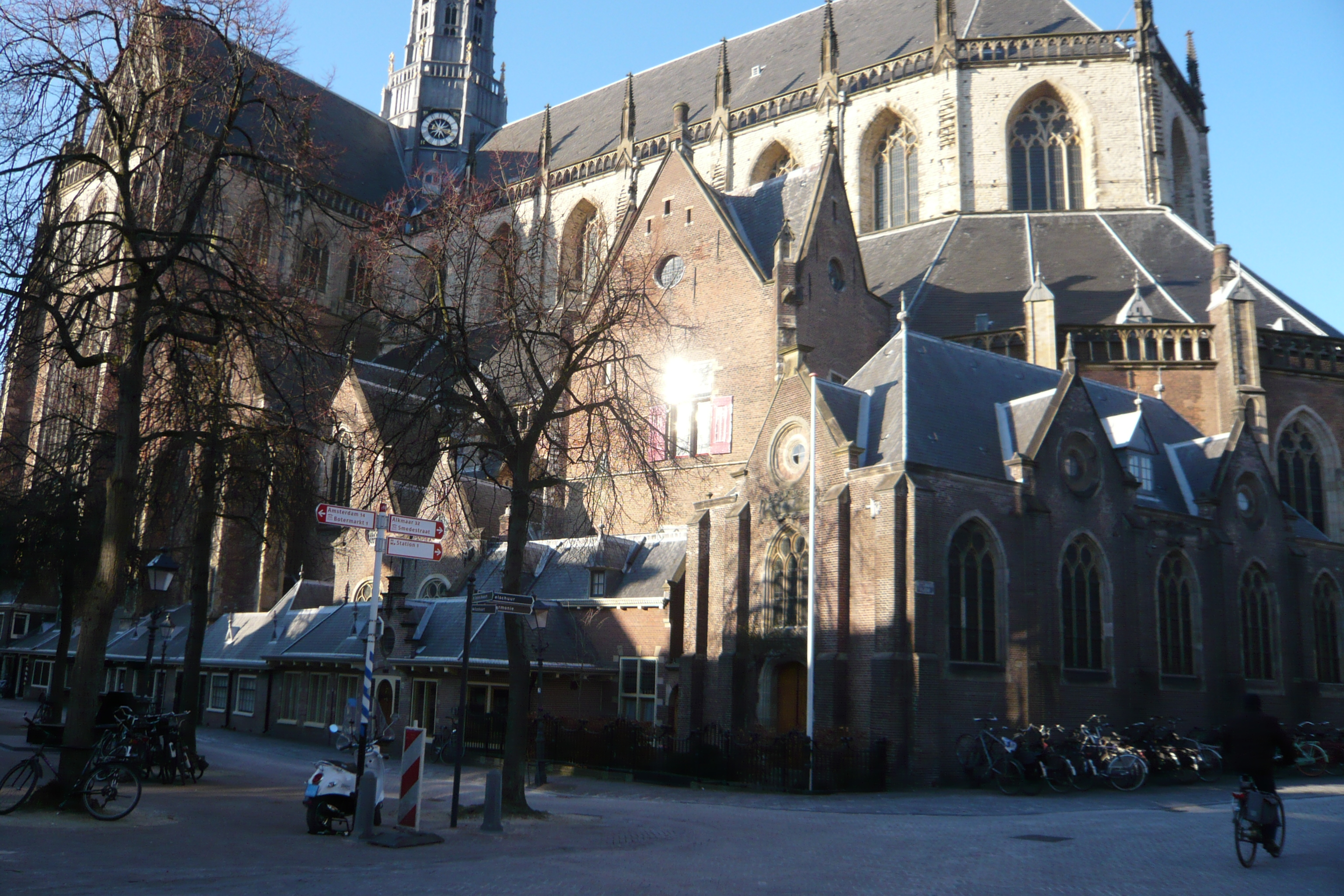
The south side today - on the right is the consistory added by De Bray

Though the exterior of the church seems timeless, it changed twice in the past 500 years; once when all statuary was removed from the outer niches during the Haarlemse Noon, and the second time in the late 19th century when a "more Gothic look" was given to the church by adding some fake ramparts to the roof edge. This can be seen easily when comparing pictures made before and afterwards.

Around the church various low buildings have been built up against it, most notably the former fish market called De Vishal, which today is used for exhibiting modern art. On the south side a series of low buildings used as shops are built up against various church buildings such as the former "librye" or library, and sacristy. In 1630 the architect Salomon de Bray designed and built the consistory which still exists today.

== Interior ==
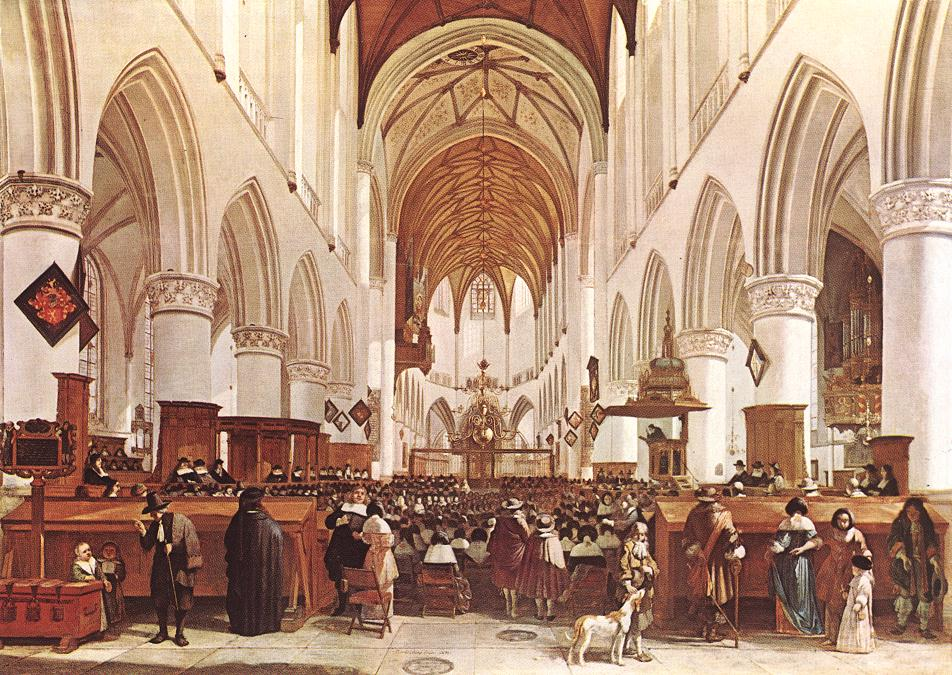
Interior of St Bavo. Haarlem, by Gerrit Adriaensz. Berckheyde, 1673 (National Gallery, London)

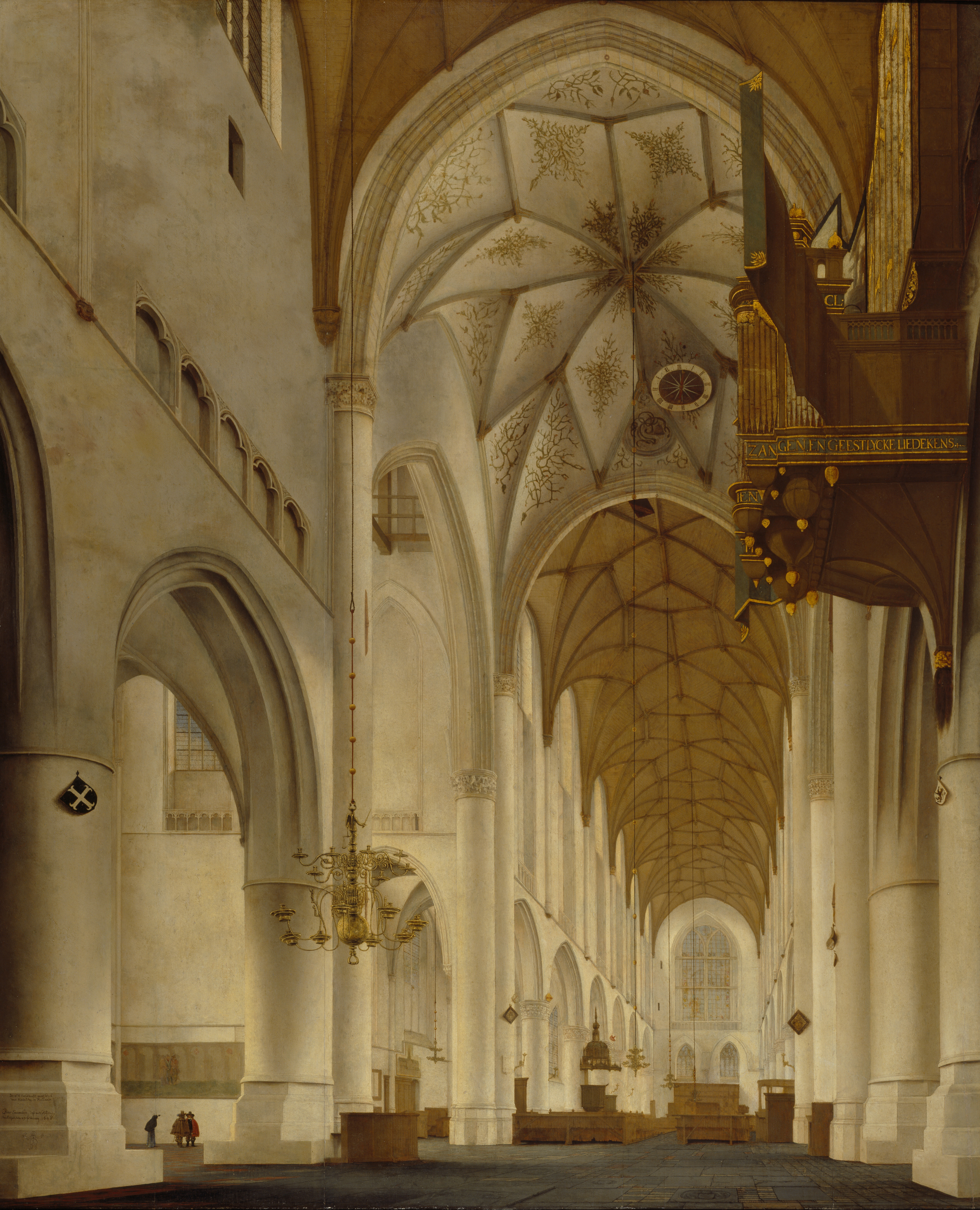
The Interior of St Bavo's Church, Haarlem by Pieter Jansz. Saenredam, 1648 (Scottish National Gallery, Edinburgh)

The interior of the church has also changed little over the years, though the inner chapels suffered greatly during the Beeldenstorm, and many stained-glass windows have been lost to neglect. Fortunately, the interior has been painted many times by local painters, most notably by Pieter Jansz Saenredam and the Berckheyde brothers. Based on these paintings, work has been done to reconstruct the interior so various items such as rouwborden or "mourning shields" hang again today in their "proper" place.

=== Stained glass windows ===
The stained glass windows of the Bavo have suffered through the years from neglect. It is hard to imagine that Haarlem was an important center for stained glass art in the 16th century, since so little evidence of it still exists in Haarlem. After the Reformation, Haarlem promoted the stories of the Damiaatjes and the associated Wapenvermeerdering and produced many windows with this central story, which it presented as a gift to other churches and town halls. Today the original Haarlem gift by Willem Thibaut still hangs in the Janskerk (Gouda) as designed. That window gives an impression of the type of window that once hung in the Western wall. When the famous Muller organ was installed, the glass on the west side of the church (now only known to us from the painting by the local painter Job Berckheyde) with the Wapenvermeerdering, was dismantled and bricked up. The sketches for this glass have survived and are in the possession of the Rijksmuseum in Amsterdam and were drawn by Barend van Orley.

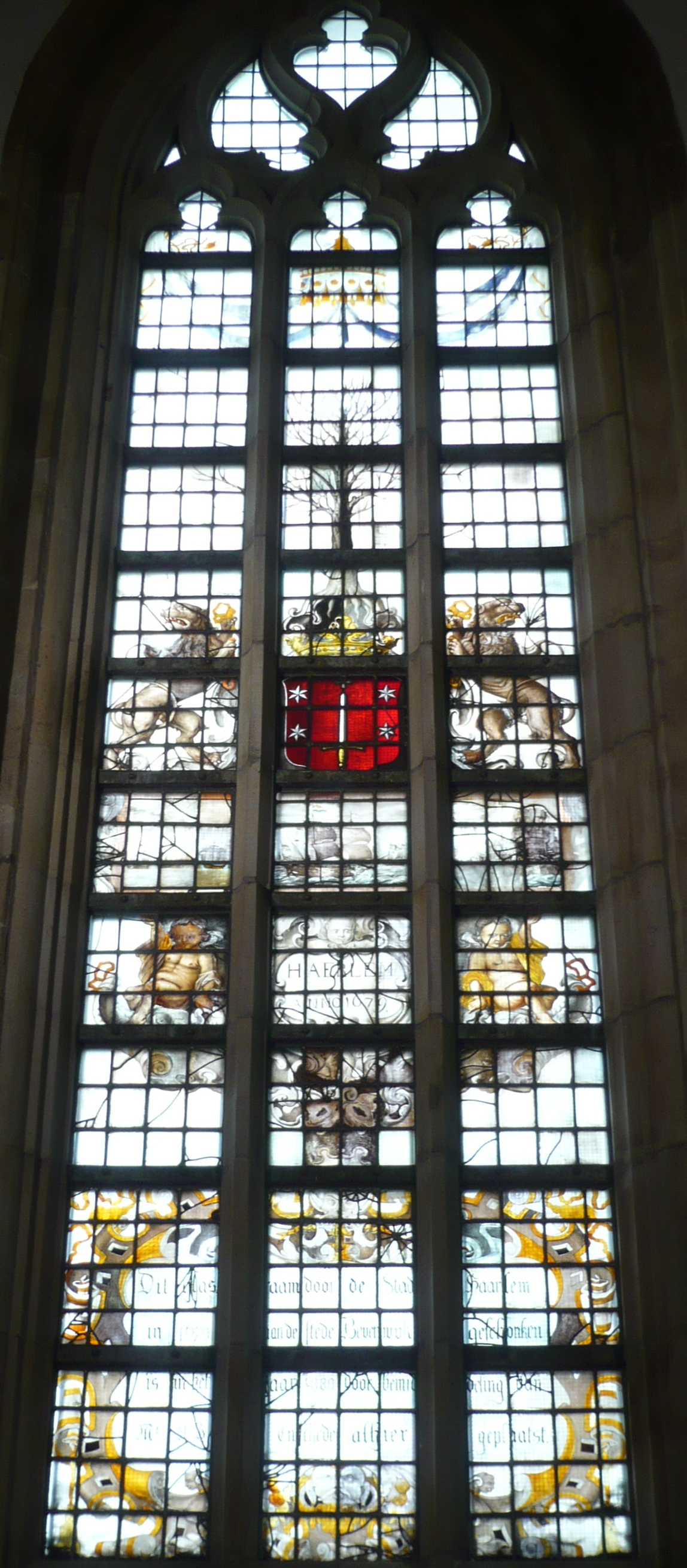
This is the only window remaining in the church showing the Damiate legend. It was originally given by Haarlem to Beverwijk in 1679.

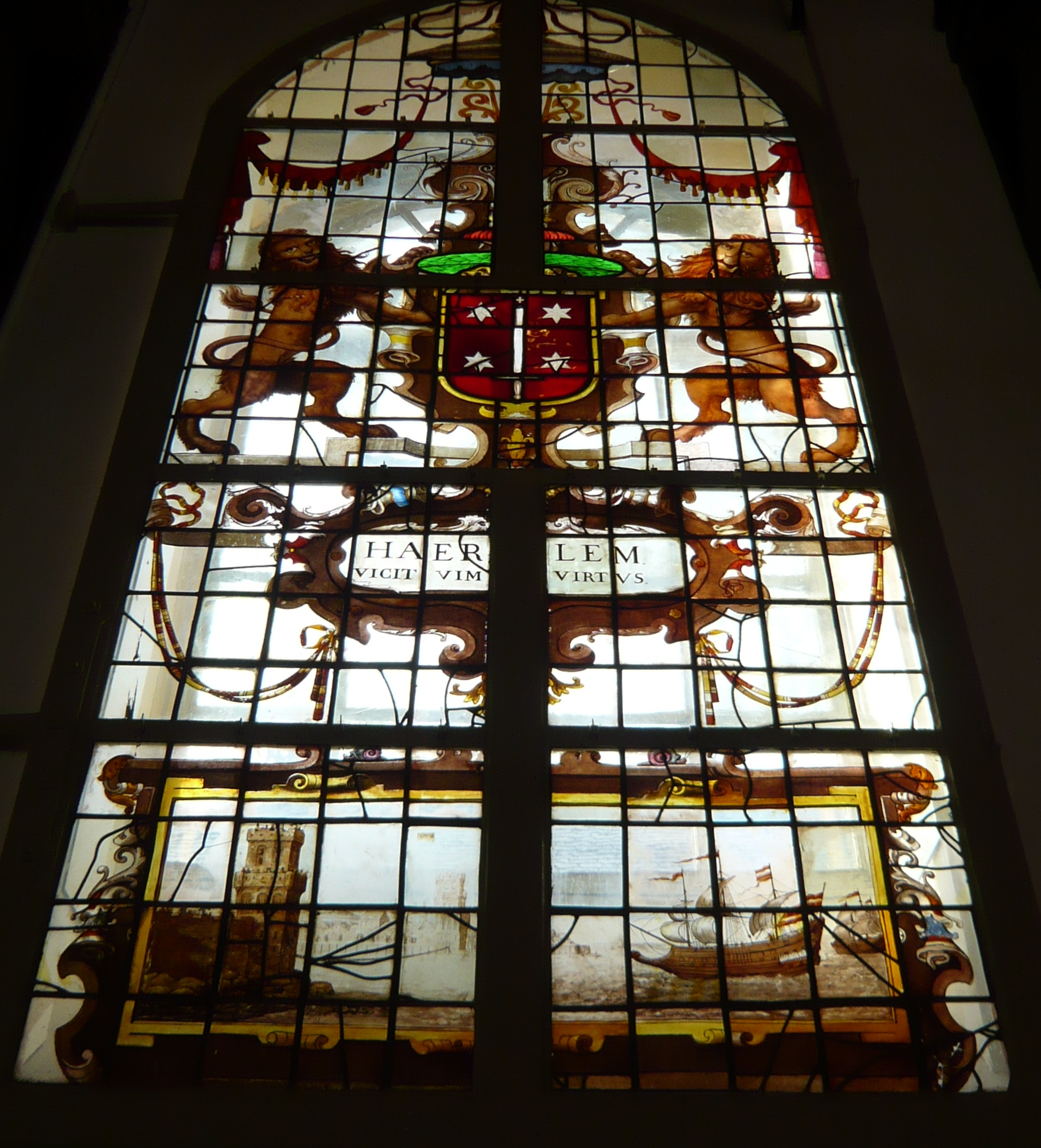
Window now in Haarlem City Hall, originally made by Thibaut for a church in Bloemendaal

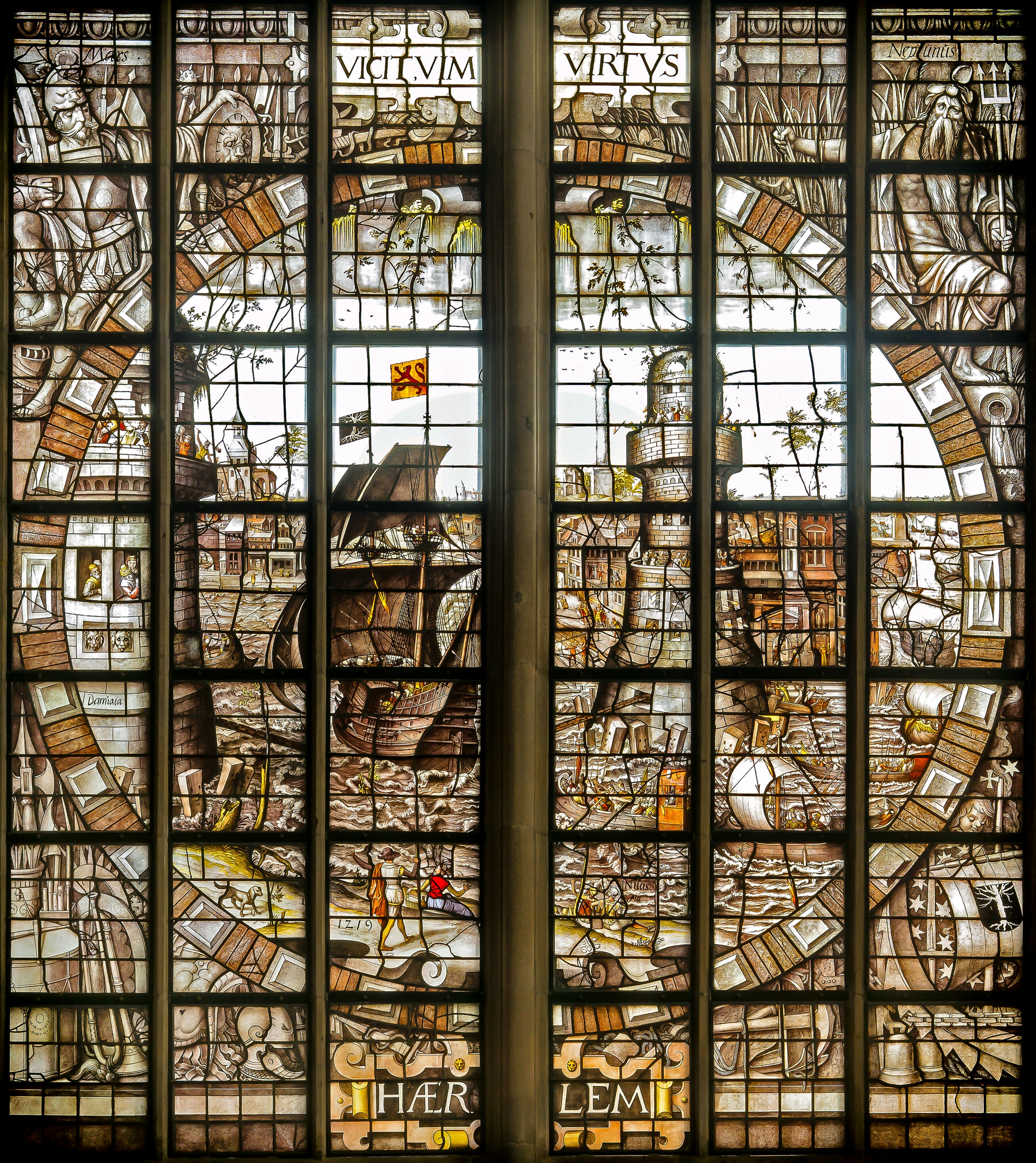
Window now in the Janskerk (Gouda), by Thibaut

In the church today, the lack of historic colorful windows has been made up for by installing windows from other, demolished or defunct churches, while modern artists have created new themes. A beautiful large blue window hanging on the northern side greets the visitor who enters through the double doors on the Groenmarkt. This window was made to personify peace and harmony, and was made by the local glass artist Michel van Overbeeke, who received a local prize of culture for this in 2009 (De Olifant).

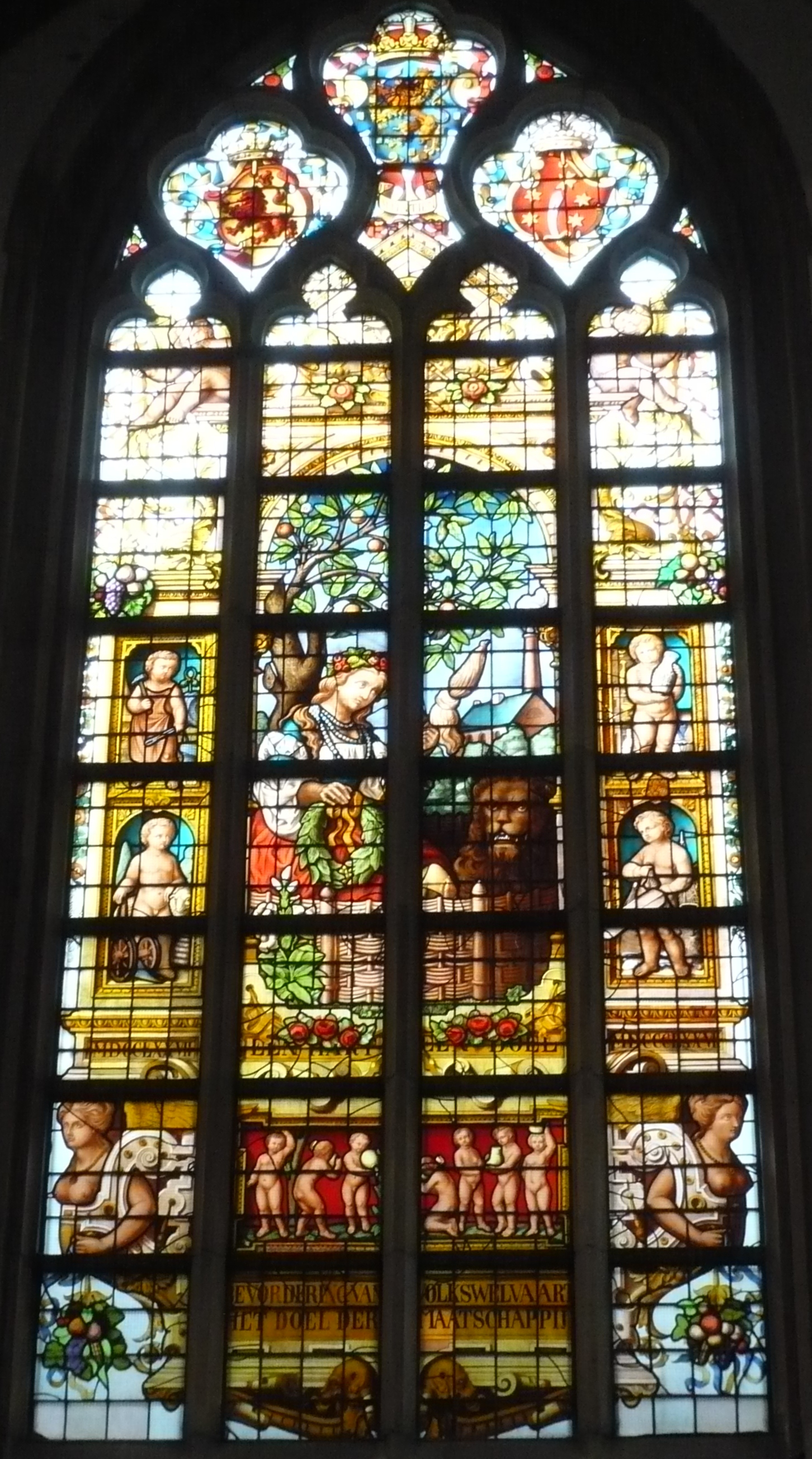
Stained glass window of the Dutch maiden was made in 1877 and donated by the Nederlandsche Maatschappij voor Nijverheid en Handel for their 100th anniversary

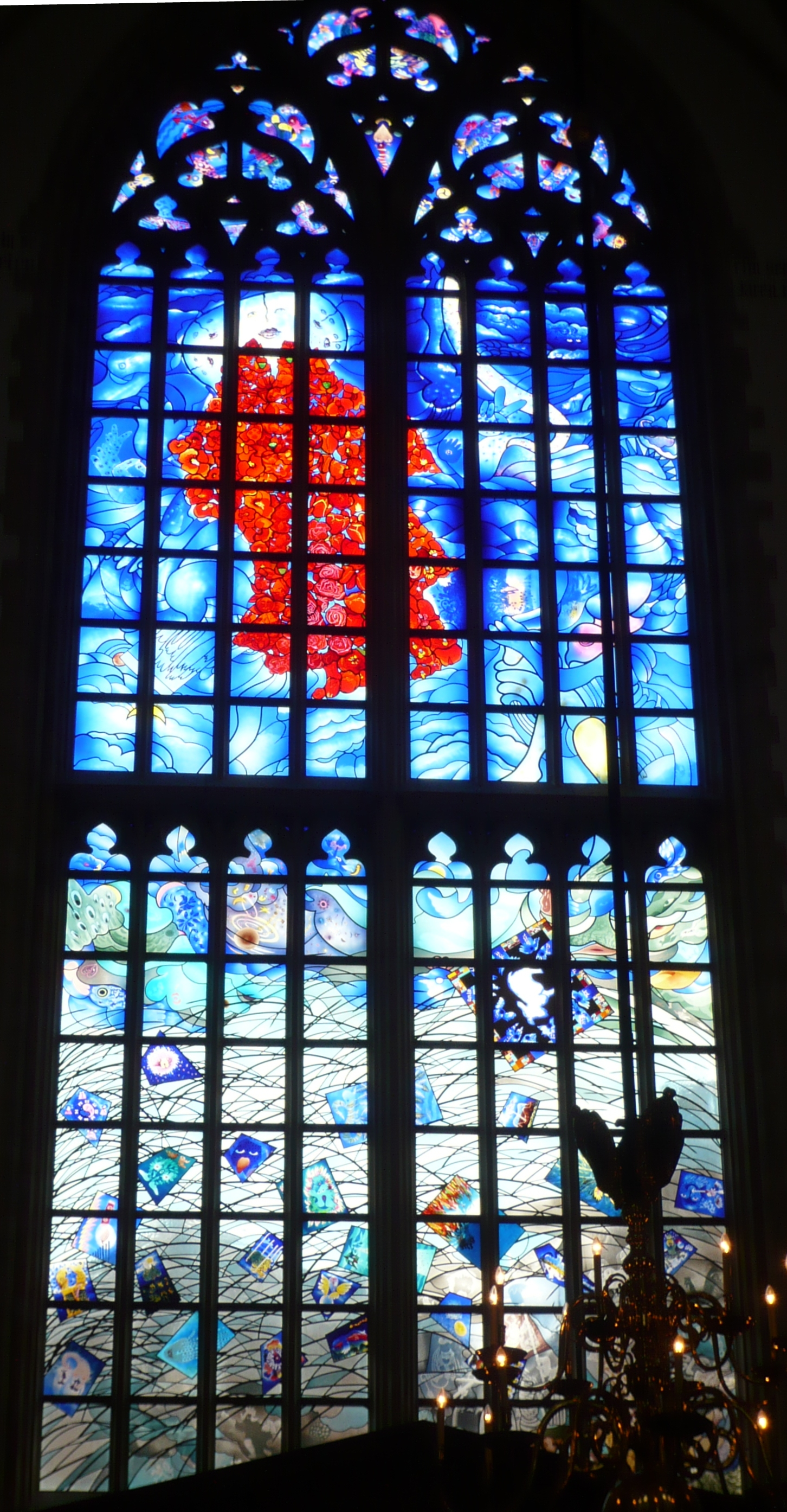
Peace & Harmony, by Michel van Overbeeke, 2009

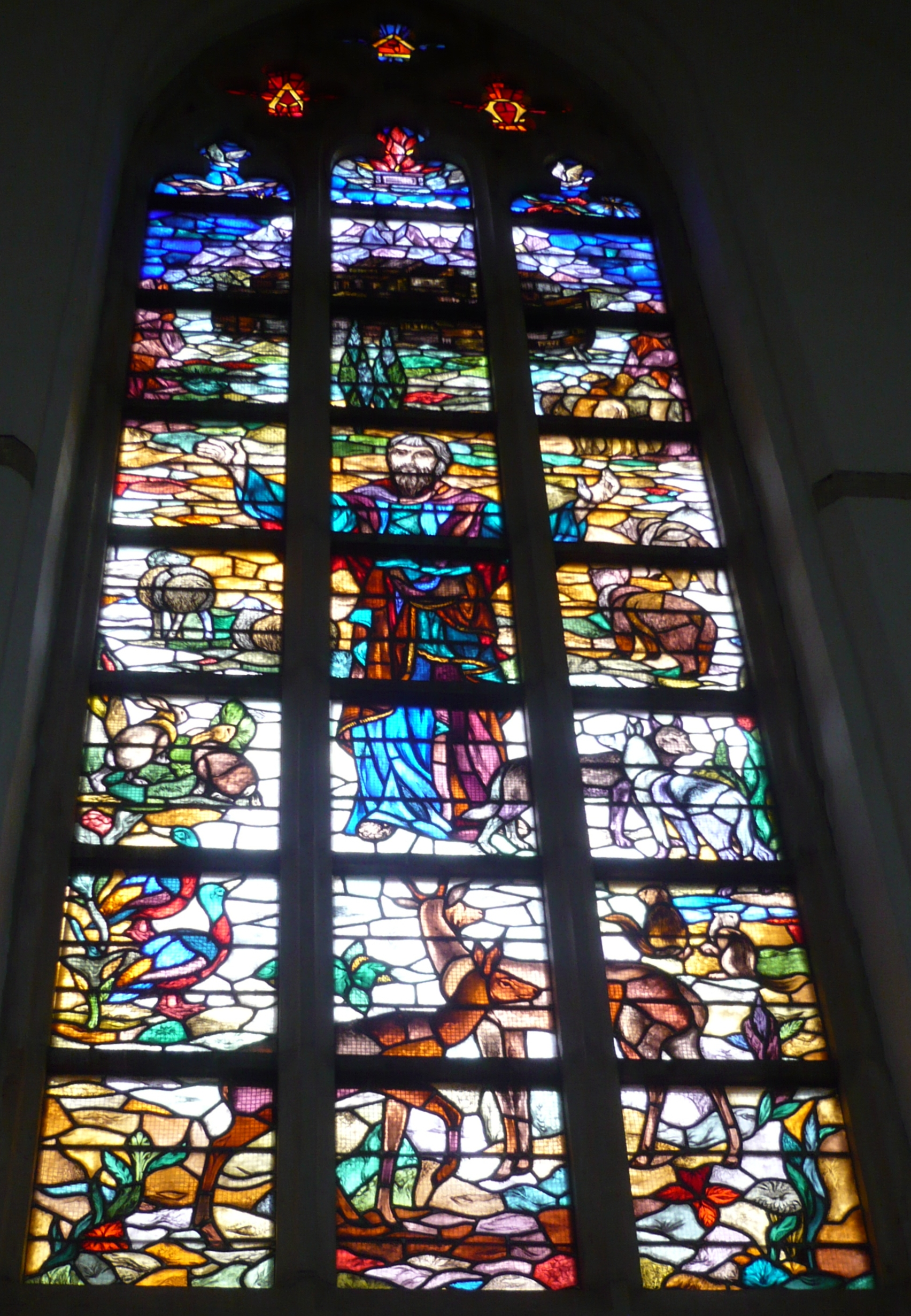
Noah, by Louis Boermeester, 1985

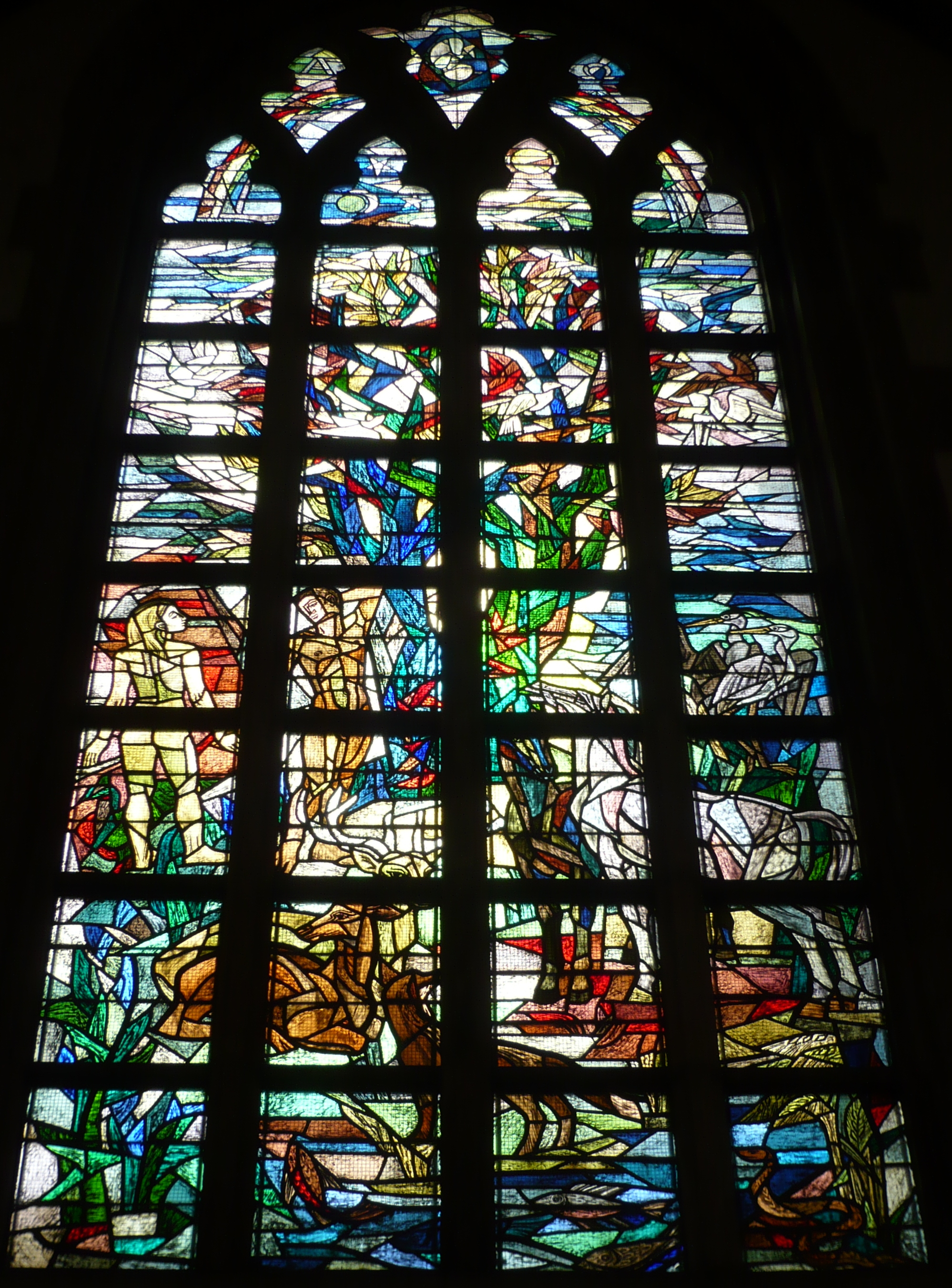
Paradise, by Gunhild Kristensen, 1957

== Organ ==
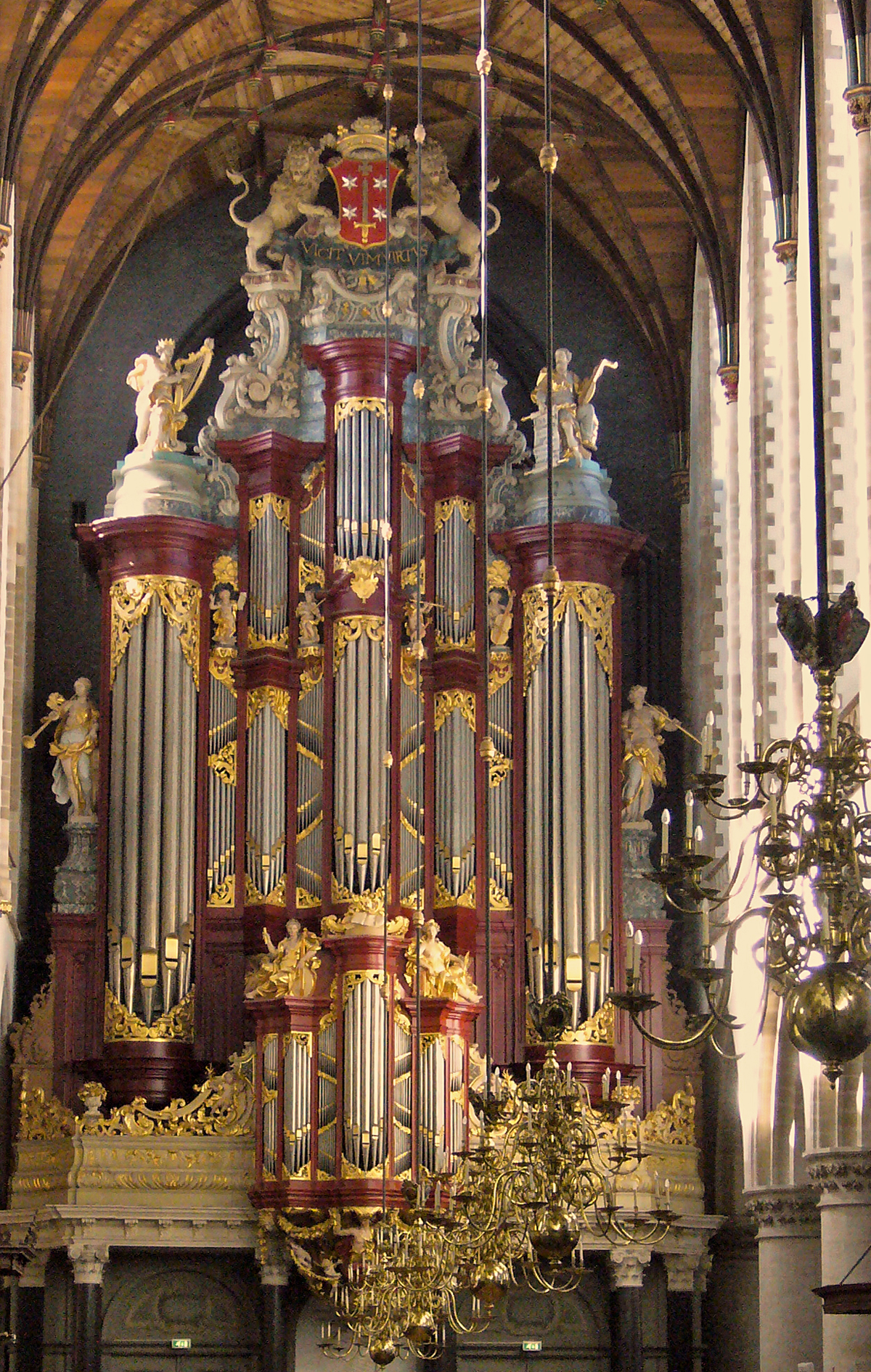
Façade of the pipe organ at Sint-Bavokerk. Mozart once played this organ.

The organ of the Sint-Bavokerk (the Christiaan Müller organ) is one of the world's most historically important organs. It was built by the Amsterdam organ builder Christian Müller, with stucco decorations by the Amsterdam artist Jan van Logteren, between 1735 and 1738. Upon completion it was the largest organ in the world with 60 voices and 32-foot pedal-towers. In Moby-Dick (1851), Herman Melville describes the inside of a whale's mouth:

"Seeing all these colonnades of bone so methodically ranged about, would you not think you were inside of the great Haarlem organ, and gazing upon its thousand pipes?"

Many famous musicians played this organ, including Mendelssohn, Händel and the 10-year-old Mozart, who played it in 1766. The organ was modified a number of times in the 19th and 20th centuries and most drastically altered in the renovation by Marcussen between 1959 and 1961. Further voicing work was undertaken between 1987 and 2000. Today concerts are regularly held in the church, and all through the year special opening times are organized so the public can walk in free of charge to listen to this famous organ in action.

A local story goes to say that the bass of the organ was so low, the mortar in between the brimstones started to brittle to nothing.

=== Disposition ===
I Rugwerk C–d^{3}
18.	Praestant II	8′
19.	Holpyp	8′
20.	Quintadena	8′
21.	Octaaf	4′
22.	Fluyt Does	4′
23.	Speelfluyt	3′
24.	Super Octaaf	2′
25.	Mixtuur VI–VIII	1′
26.	Sexquialter II–IV
27.	Cymbaal III
28.	Cornet IV D
29.	Fagot	16′
30.	Trompet	8′
31.	Trechterregal	8′
	Tremulant

II Hoofdwerk C–d^{3}
1.	Praestant I-II	16′
2.	Bourdon	16′
3.	Octaaf I-II	8′
4.	Roerfluyt	8′
5.	Viola di Gamba	8′
6.	Roerquint	6′
7.	Octaaf	4′
8.	Gemshoorn	4′
9.	Quintpraestant	3′
10.	Woudfluyt	2′
11.	Mixtuur IV–X	2′-8′
12.	Scherp VI–VIII	1^{1}/_{2}′
13.	Tertiaan II	2′
14.	Trompet	16′
15.	Trompet	8′
16.	Hautbois	8′
17.	Trompet	4′

III Bovenwerk C–d^{3}
32.	Quintadena	16′
33.	Praestant	8′
34.	Baarpyp	8′
35.	Quintadena	8′
36.	Octaaf	4′
37.	Flagfluyt	4′
38.	Nasaet	3′
39.	Nagthoorn	2′
40.	Flageolet	1^{1}/_{2}′
41.	Mixtuur IV–VI	2′
42.	Sexquialter II
43.	Cymbaal
44.	Schalmey	8′
45.	Dolceaan	8′
46.	Vox Humana	8′
	Tremulant

Pedaal C–f^{1}
47.	Principaal	32′
48.	Praestant	16′
49.	Bourdon	16′
50.	Roerquint	12′
51.	Octaaf	8′
52.	Holfluyt	8′
53.	Quintpraestant	6′
54.	Octaaf	4′
55.	Holfluyt	2′
56.	Mixtuur VI–X	2′
57.	Ruyschquint V	3′
58.	Bazuyn	32′
59.	Bazuyn	16′
60.	Trompet	8′
61.	Trompet	4′
62.	Zink	2′

- Couplers: I/II, III/II, I/P, II/P, III/P

== Graves ==
Until 1831 graves were allowed in the church, and many illustrious Haarlemmers through the centuries are buried there. Often people were buried under family gravestones, and the family shields of illustrious families are mounted on diamond shaped "plaques" hanging on the walls. Other illustrious Haarlemmers were buried in individual graves such as the rich Pieter Teyler van der Hulst and Willem van Heythuisen. The painters Maarten van Heemskerck (as a former church koster, he is buried in the kerstkapel), Frans Hals (who was buried in his first wife's grandfather's grave, Nicolaes Ghyblant, but who received his own gravestone in 1962), Saenredam himself (in the South choir way near the entrance), and Jacob van Ruysdael and Salomon van Ruysdael. The two circus curiosities, the giant Daniel Cajanus with his midget friend Jan Paap, are buried there. The last burial there was for Willem Bilderdijk.

A local story is that under stone number 7 near the choir gate, there is a grave of a man who used to hit his mother as a child. After a time his hand started growing above his grave, and a copper plate had to be installed on the grave to stop the hand from growing.

There is also a story that only the rich could afford to be buried in the church. Regardless of wealth, the corpses rotted as they lay under the stone floor, producing a foul odor. This gave rise to the phrase "Stinking Rich".

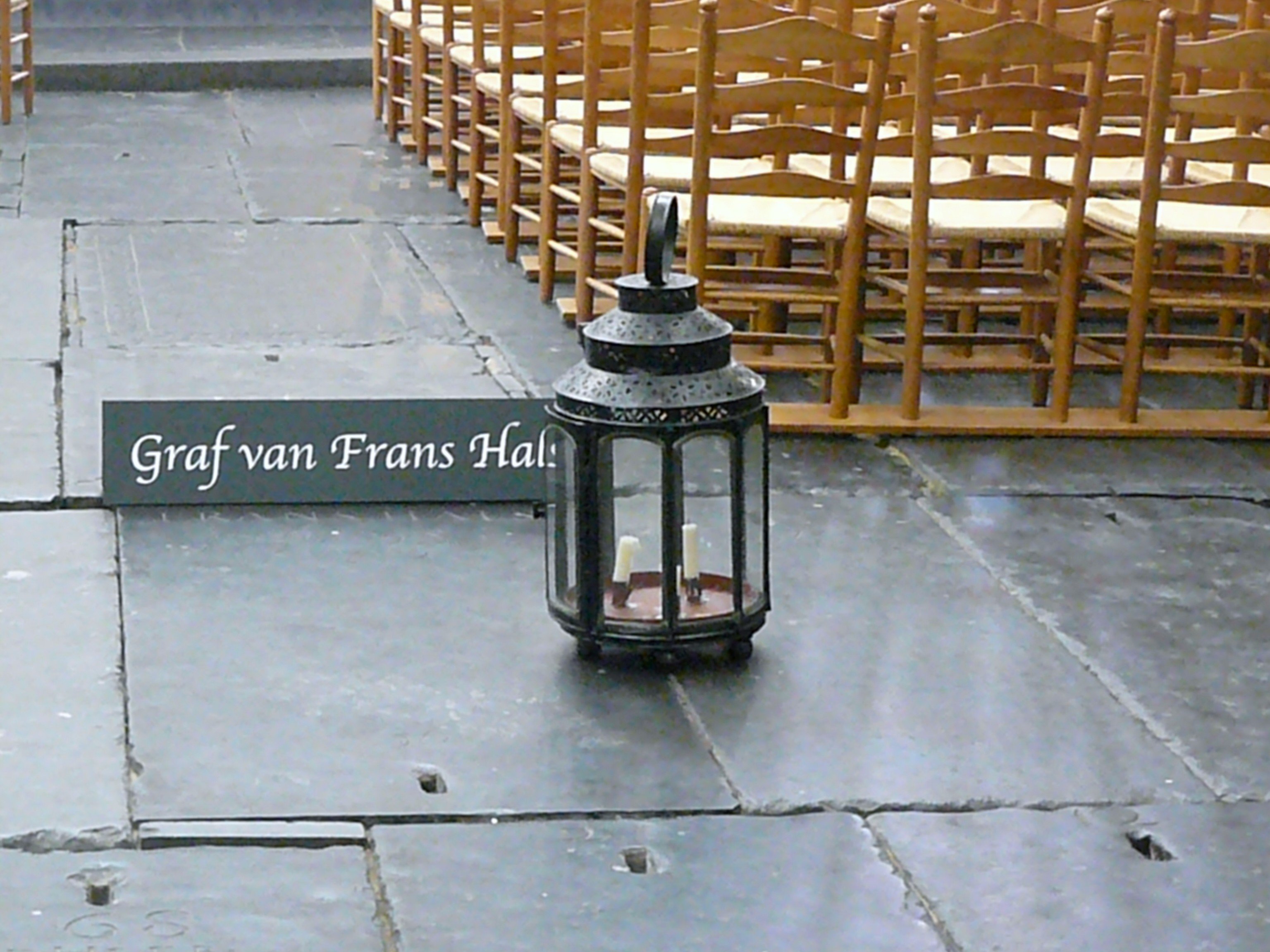
Marker for grave of Frans Hals

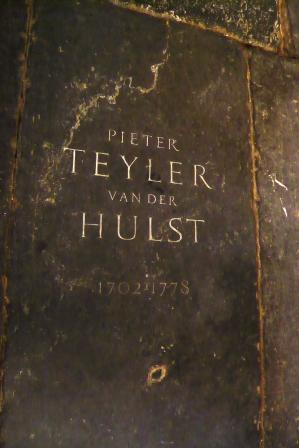
Gravestone for Pieter Teyler van der Hulst

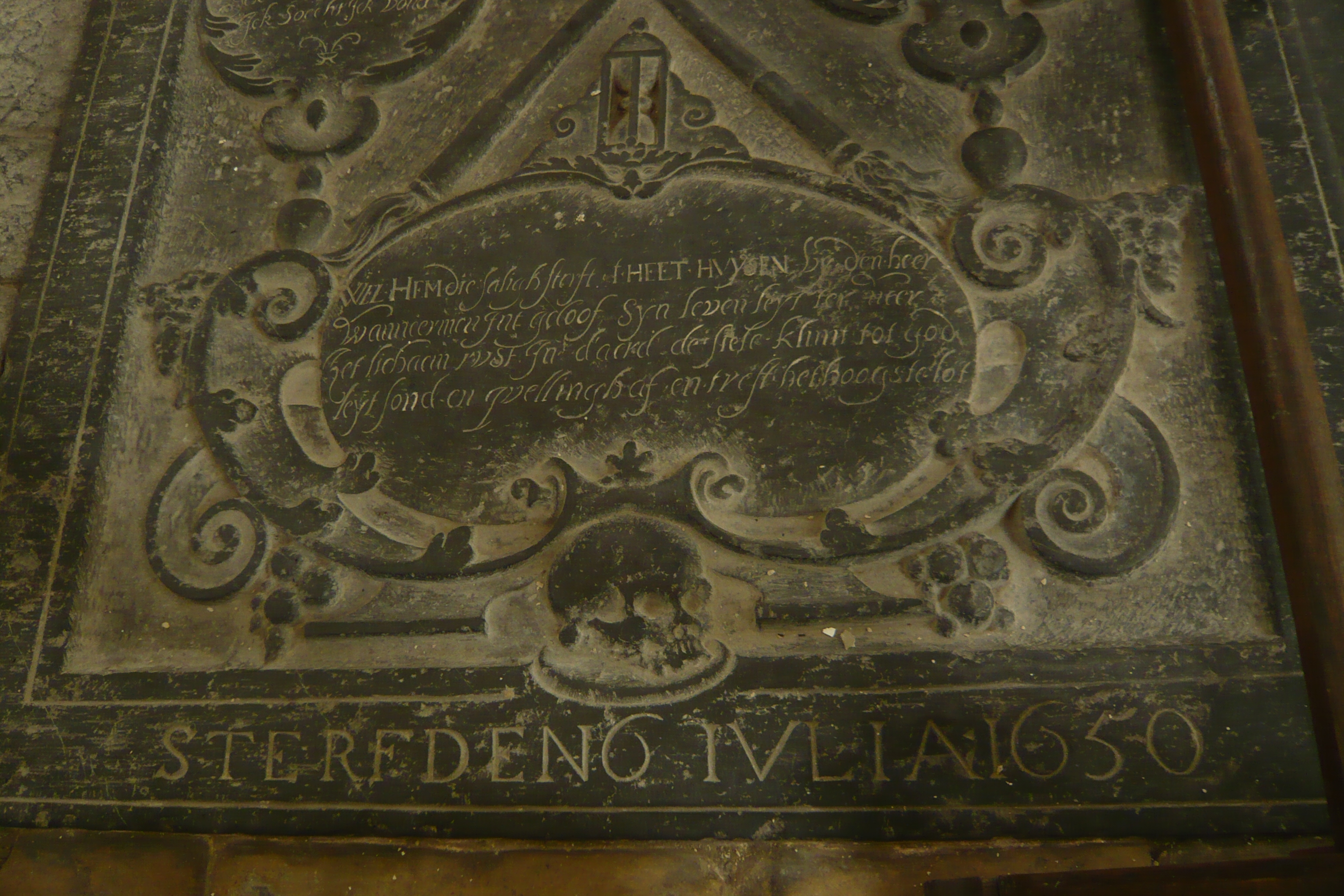
Heethuysen grave epitaph (Hofje founder in Haarlem, who died on 6 July 1650)

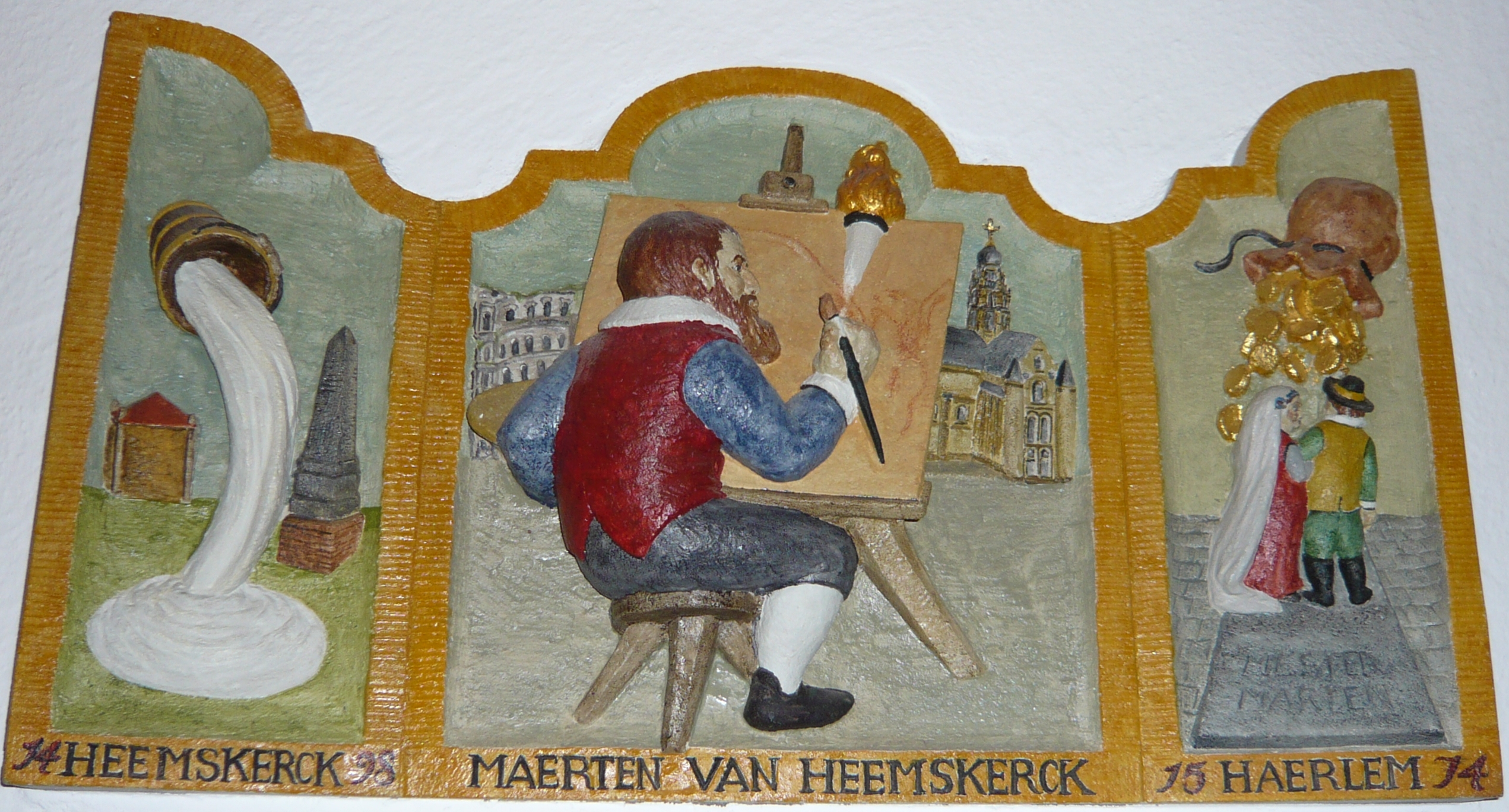
Commemorative plaque in the "Christmas chapel" to Maarten van Heemskerk

== Bells ==
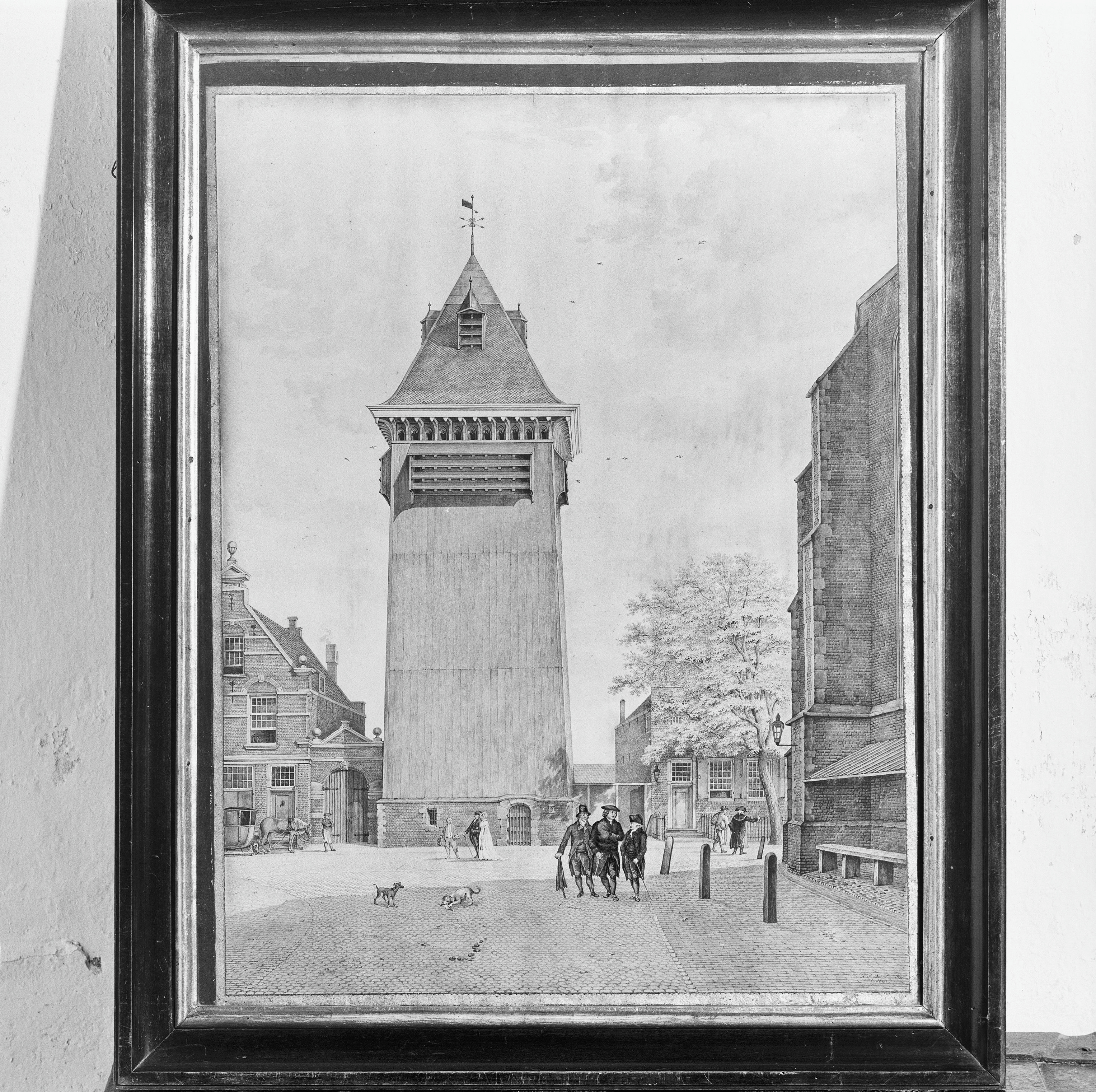
The former 'klokhuis' wooden belfry behind the choir of the 'Grote Kerk'

In 1429 the bells from the former parish church which was on the same spot where the 'Grote Kerk' was built, were hung in a large wooden belfry (klokhuis) behind the choir close of the church. It was demolished in 1804, to strengthen the finances of the city council, and the bells were sold. In 1918, a smaller iron replica was built on the same spot by the firm of Joh. Enschede where the guilder billets were printed.

Today the Haarlem Grote Kerk tower is provided with a big bourdon bell from 1503 named Roeland, made by the Kampen bellfounder Geert van Wou. It sounds with tone A^{0} and has a weight of approx. 4900 kg This biggest bell in the tower strikes the hour. In 1662 François Hemony from Amsterdam made a carillon of 33 bells, later it was enlarged by his brother Pieter Hemony to 35 bells. In 1968 25 bells were recast by Eijsbouts in Asten, and it was expanded to a concert carillon of 47 bells. The carillon is tuned in meantone temperament based on Des^{1} (Dflat^{1}). Since this restoration the old 25 bells by Hemony hang in the tower of the Bakenesserkerk also in Haarlem. In 2010, the Grote Kerk carillon was redesigned to improve the play ability. The city carillonneur plays the bells weekly on the market days and on Tuesday in the summer there is a concert just before the weekly organ concert played often by guest players. The city carillonneur also re-inserts the pins on the drum twice a year. The drum plays to announce the hour strike and all other quarters of the hour. In Haarlem there is also a very short tune on every seven and half minute. So the drum chimes eight times in the hour. Rien Donkersloot is appointed by the municipality of Haarlem as the city carillonneur of Haarlem.

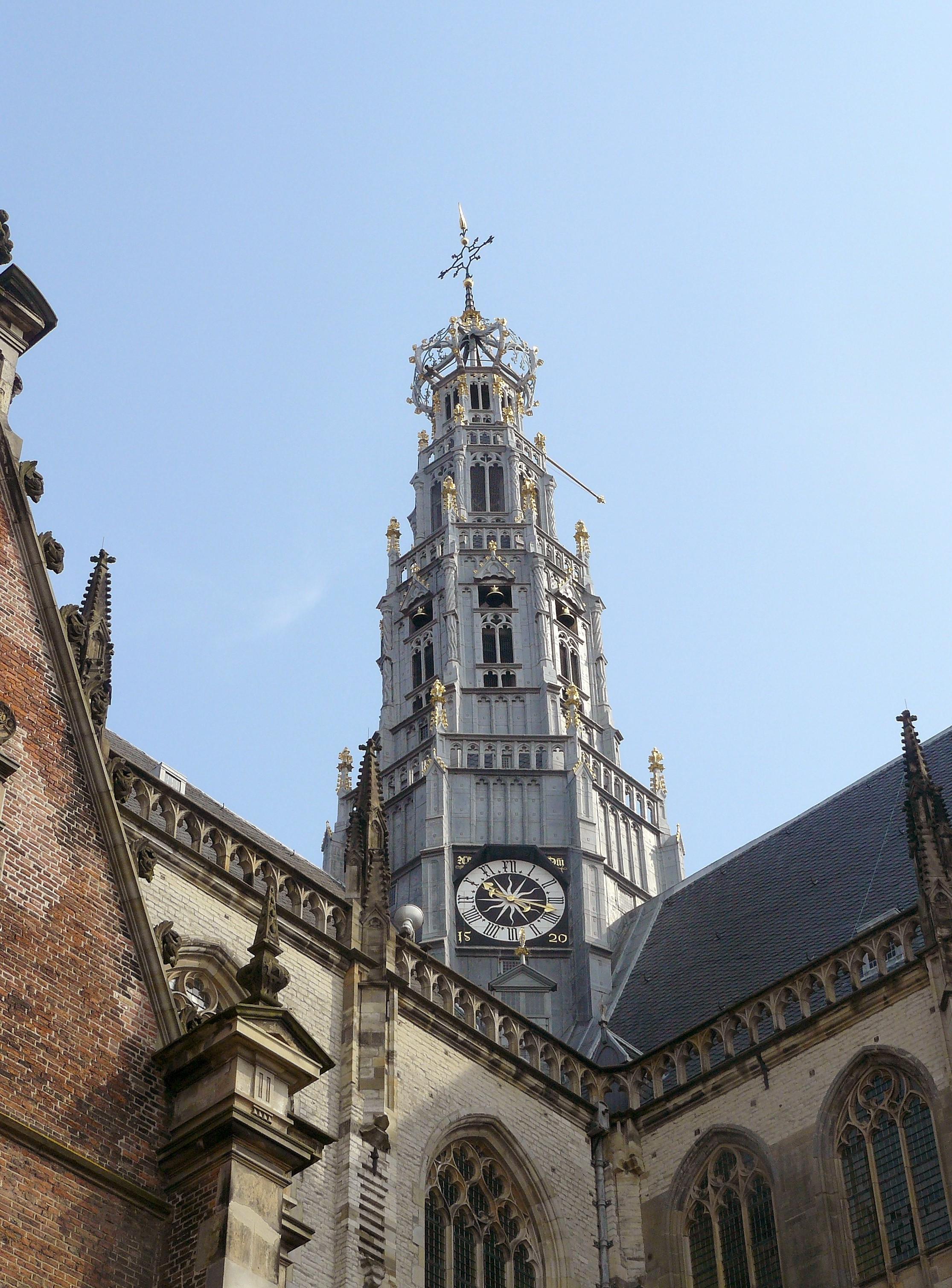
The bell tower of the Sint-Bavokerk

According to the local legend known as the Wapenvermeerdering, or "Legend of the Haarlem shield", the two upper bells in the tower were taken from Damiette (Damiate in Dutch) during the Fifth Crusade by Haarlem knights and were placed in the tower. In reality, they were a gift by Johannes Dircks, a bell-maker from Aalst to Nicolaas van Nieuwland, the bishop of Haarlem, in 1562. Since then the two bells were chimed every evening between 21:00 and 21:30 o'clock, to give a signal for closing the city gates. In 1732 the bells were recast, and installed, by Jan Albert de Grave a bellfounder from Amsterdam. Since Haarlem was no longer a vesting stad or walled city, the tradition of the bells continued, to commemorate the conquest of Damiette on August 25, 1219. The bells have names Piet and Hein.

- Bells in the Grote Kerk:
- 1 Bourdon Roeland - Geert van Wou 1503
- Carillon
  - 10 by François Hemony, 1661-1662
  - 37 by Eijsbouts, 1968
- 2 Damiaatjes (Piet and Hein) - Jan Albert de Grave 1732
- 1 Kermisklok (Lunapark or pleasure fair bell) - Claude Fremy 1685
- Moving bells to be rung for the service:
  - 1 François Hemony 1667
  - 1 Eijsbouts 1965

== See also ==
- 16th-century Western domes

== Gallery ==
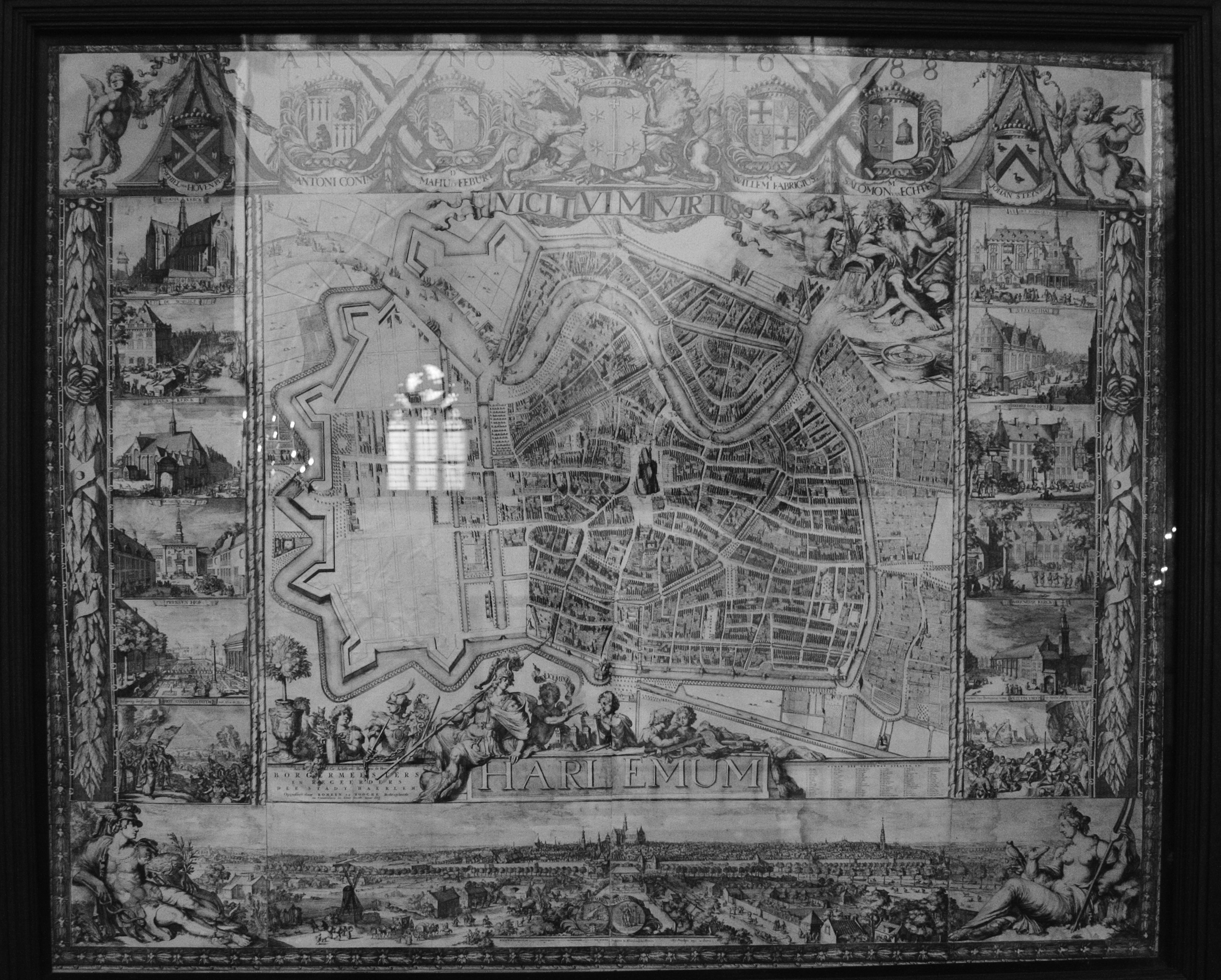
Romeyn de Hooghe's map of Haarlem from 1688

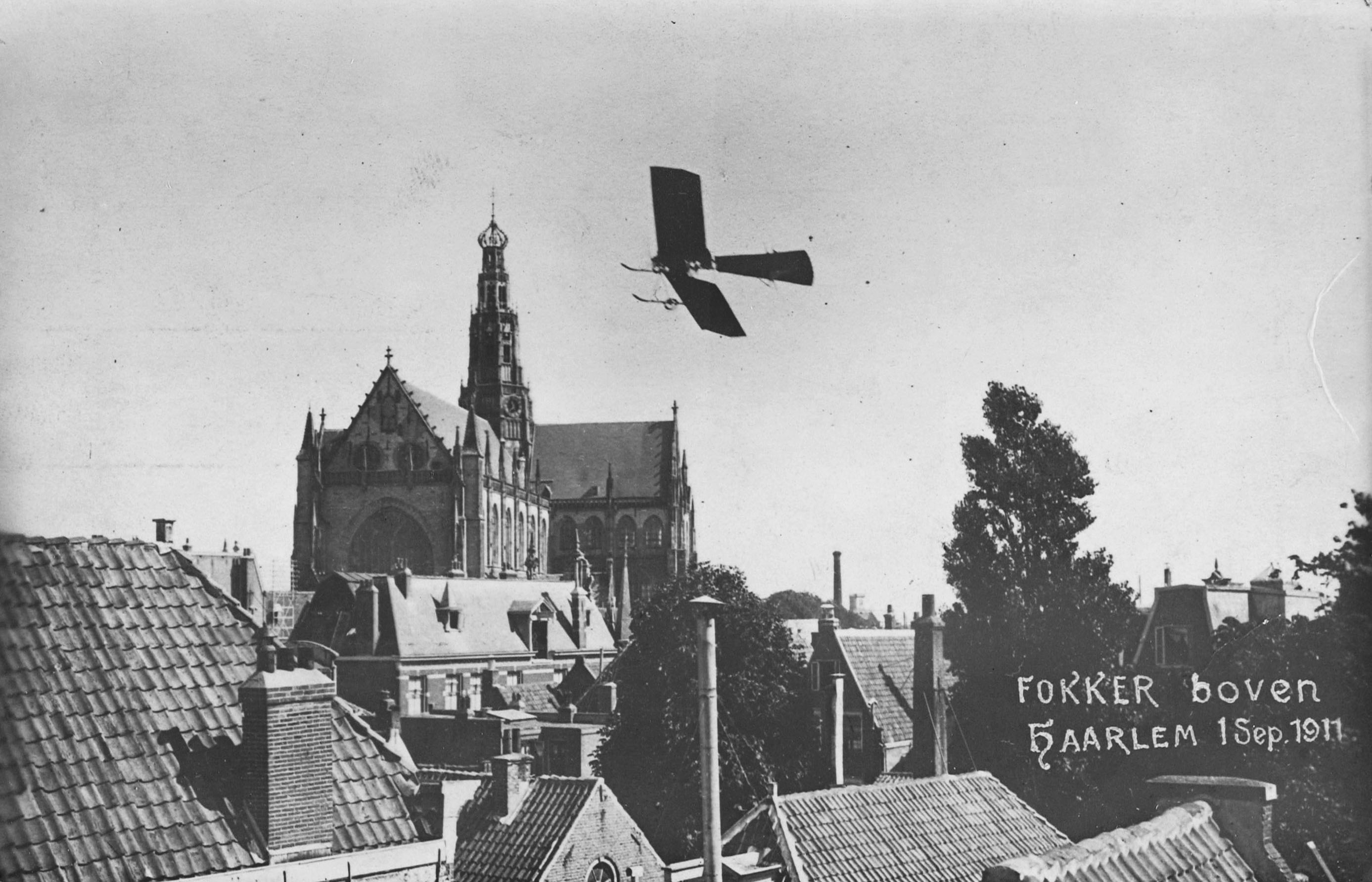
Anthony Fokker flies around the Grote Kerk in 1911

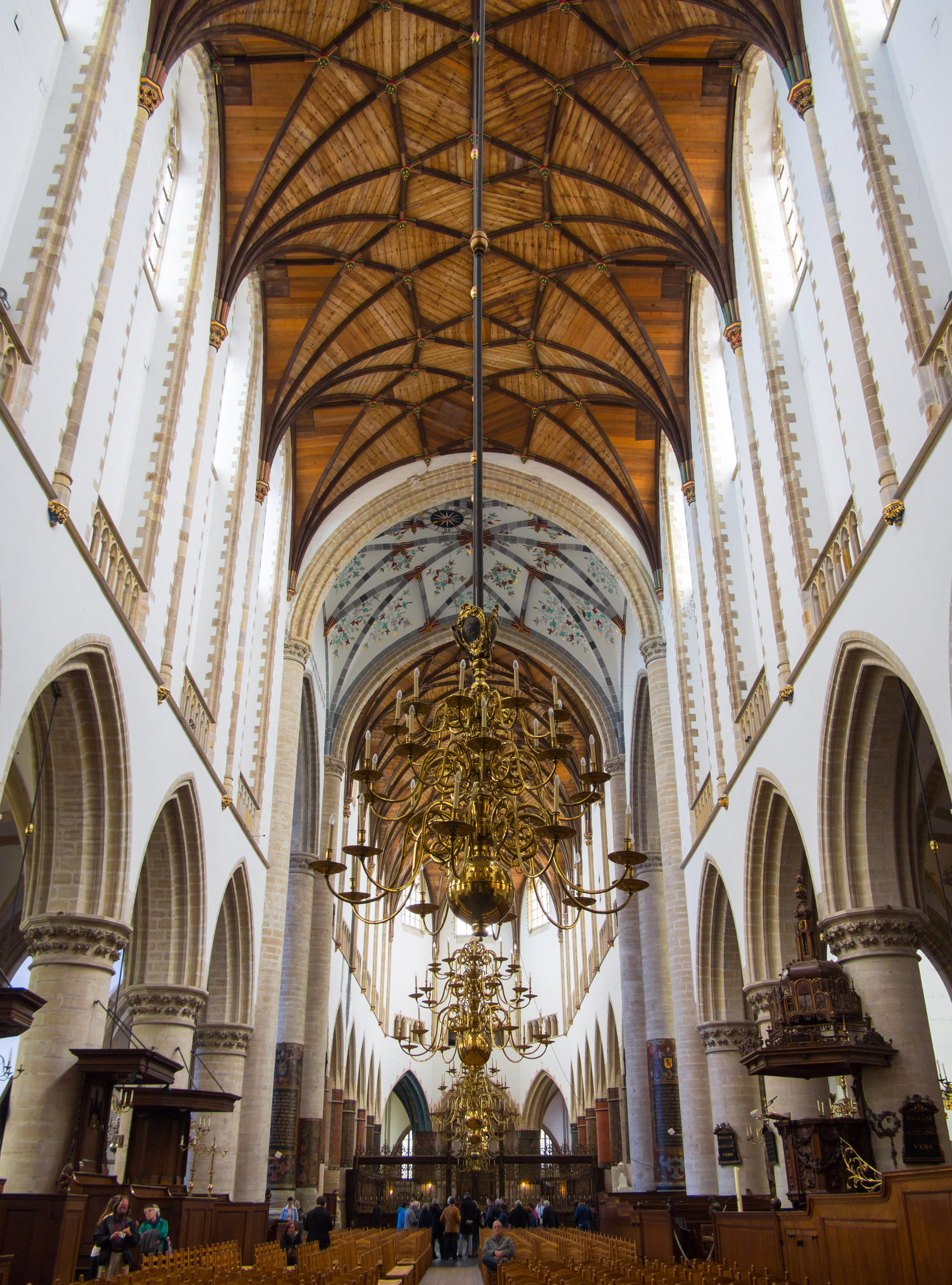
Looking east from underneath the pipe organ down the central nave

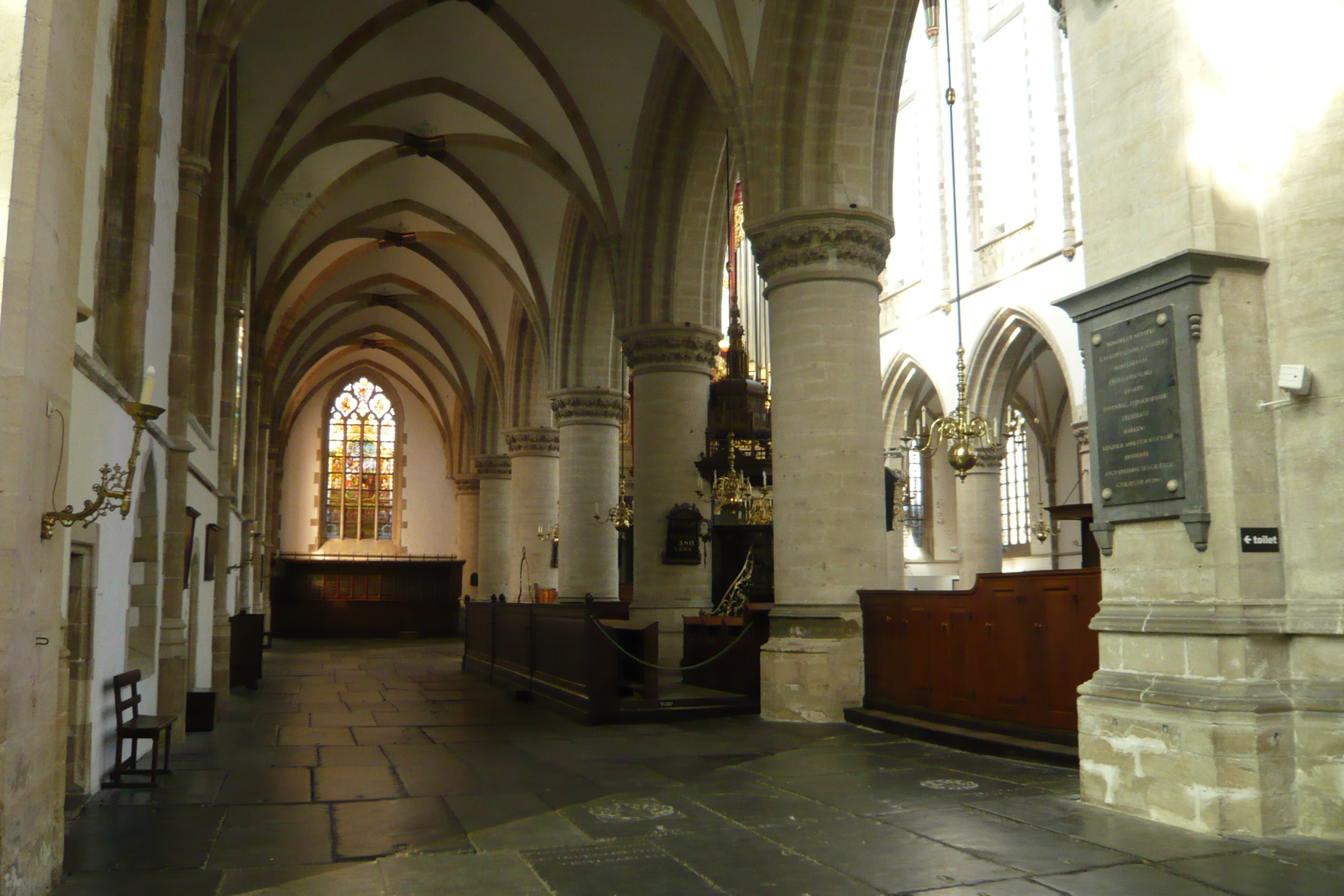
Looking west towards the bread bank in the south aisle

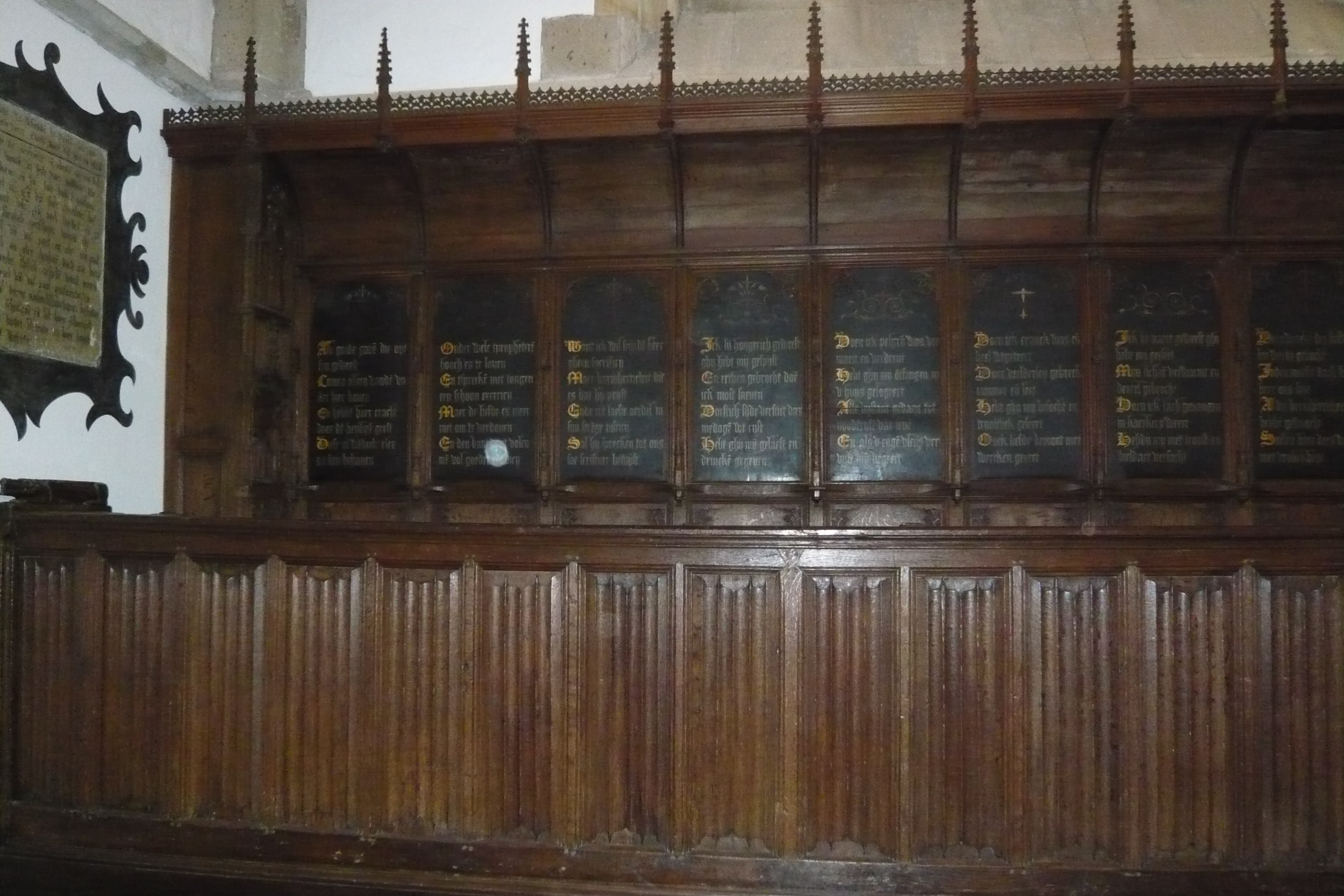
Broodbank

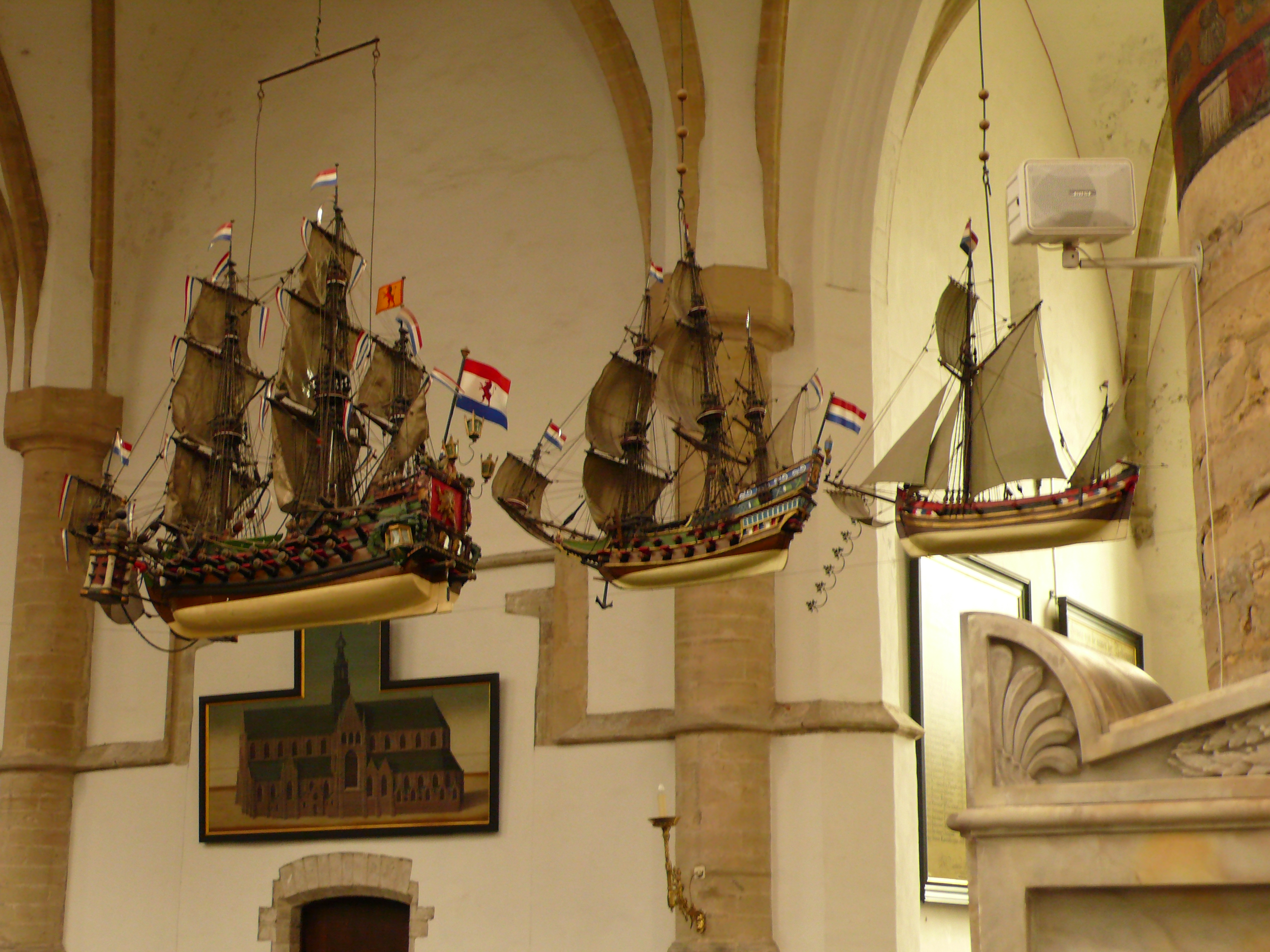
Miniature ships in Sint-Bavokerk

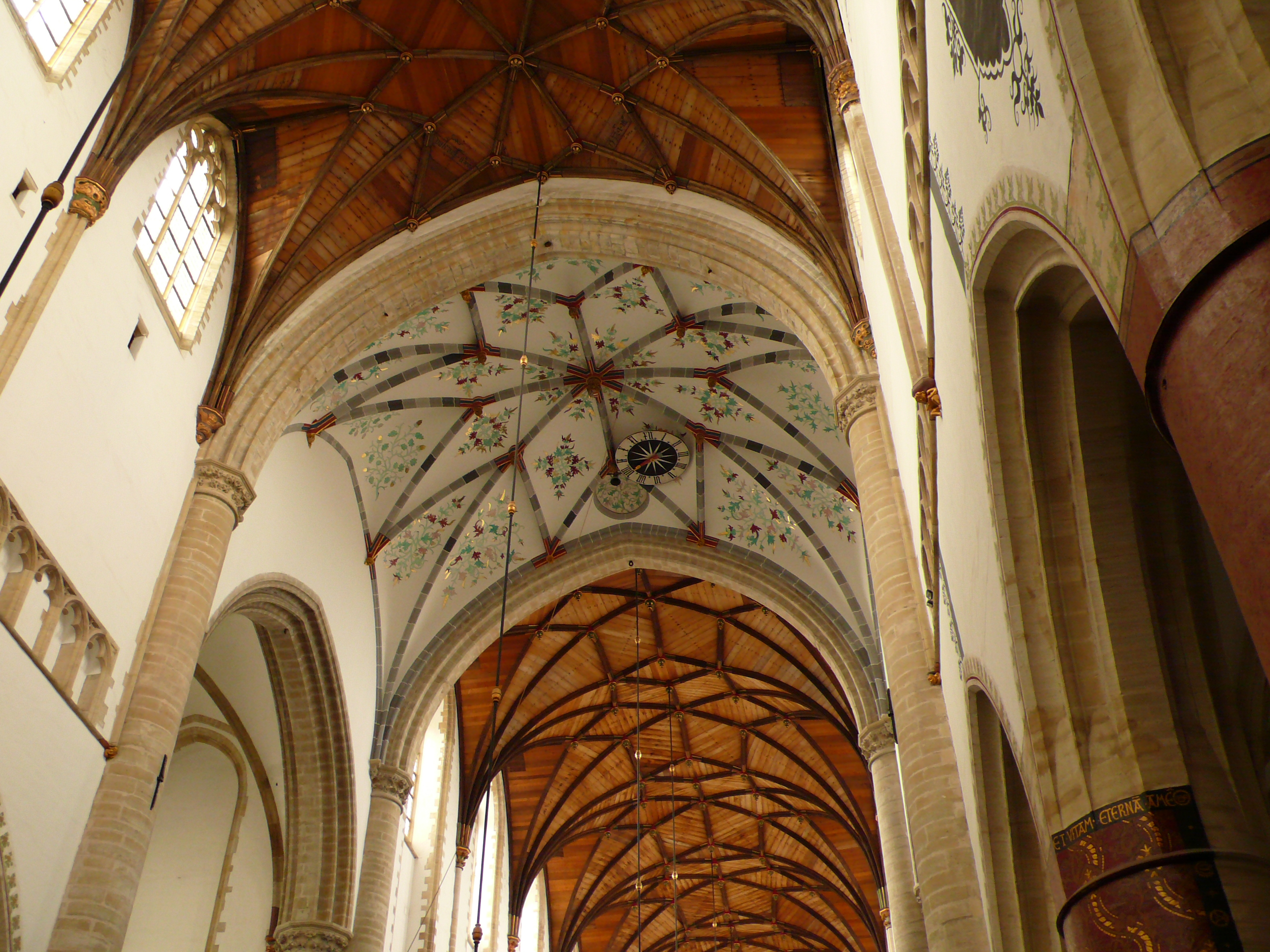
Church wooden ceiling

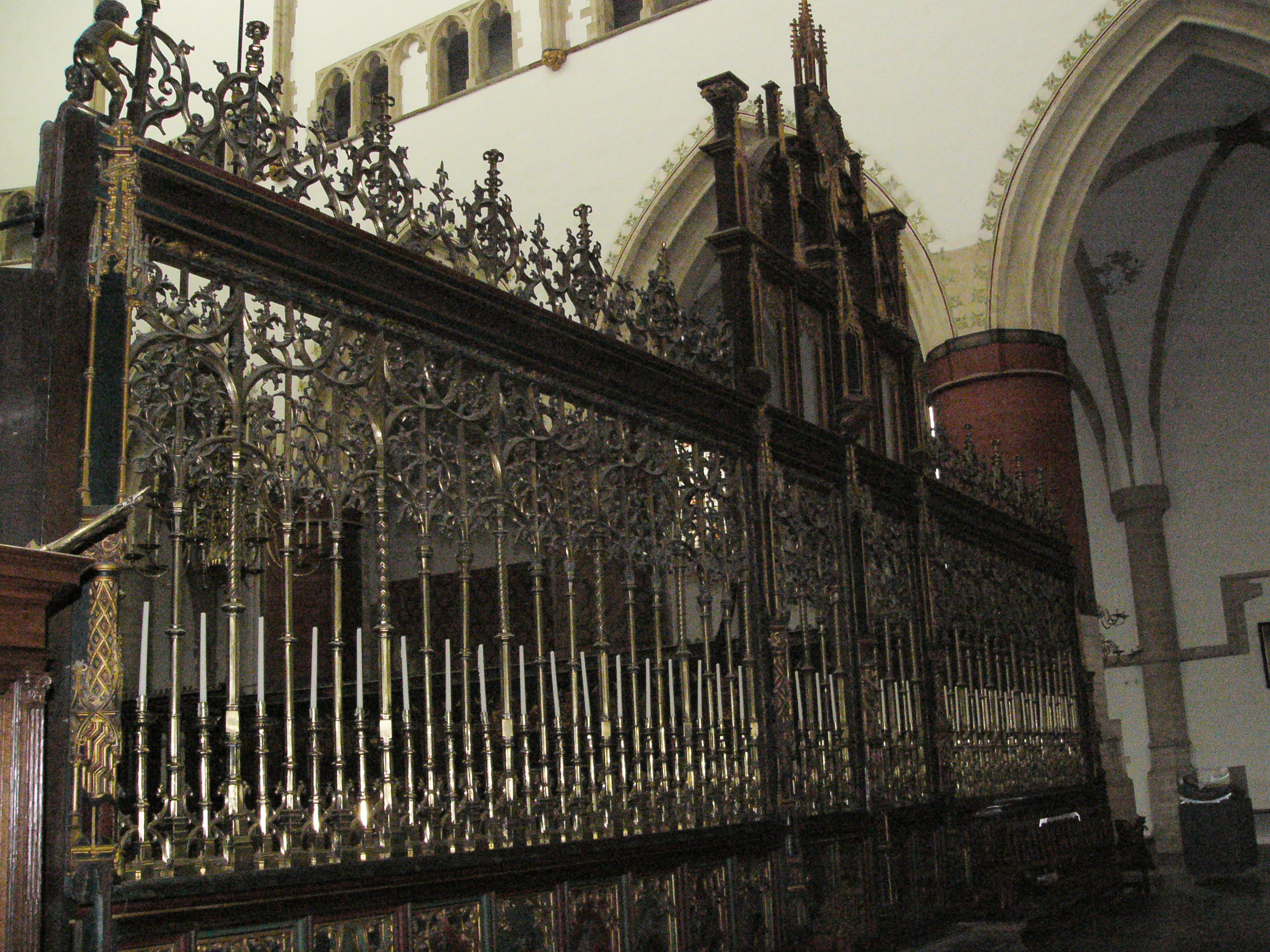
Choir gate of Sint-Bavokerk

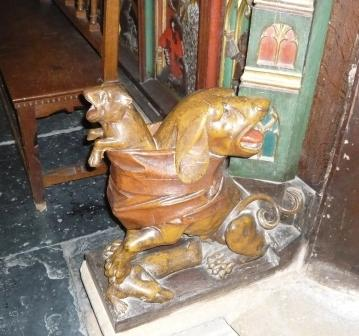
Two-faced dog at the base of the Choir gate

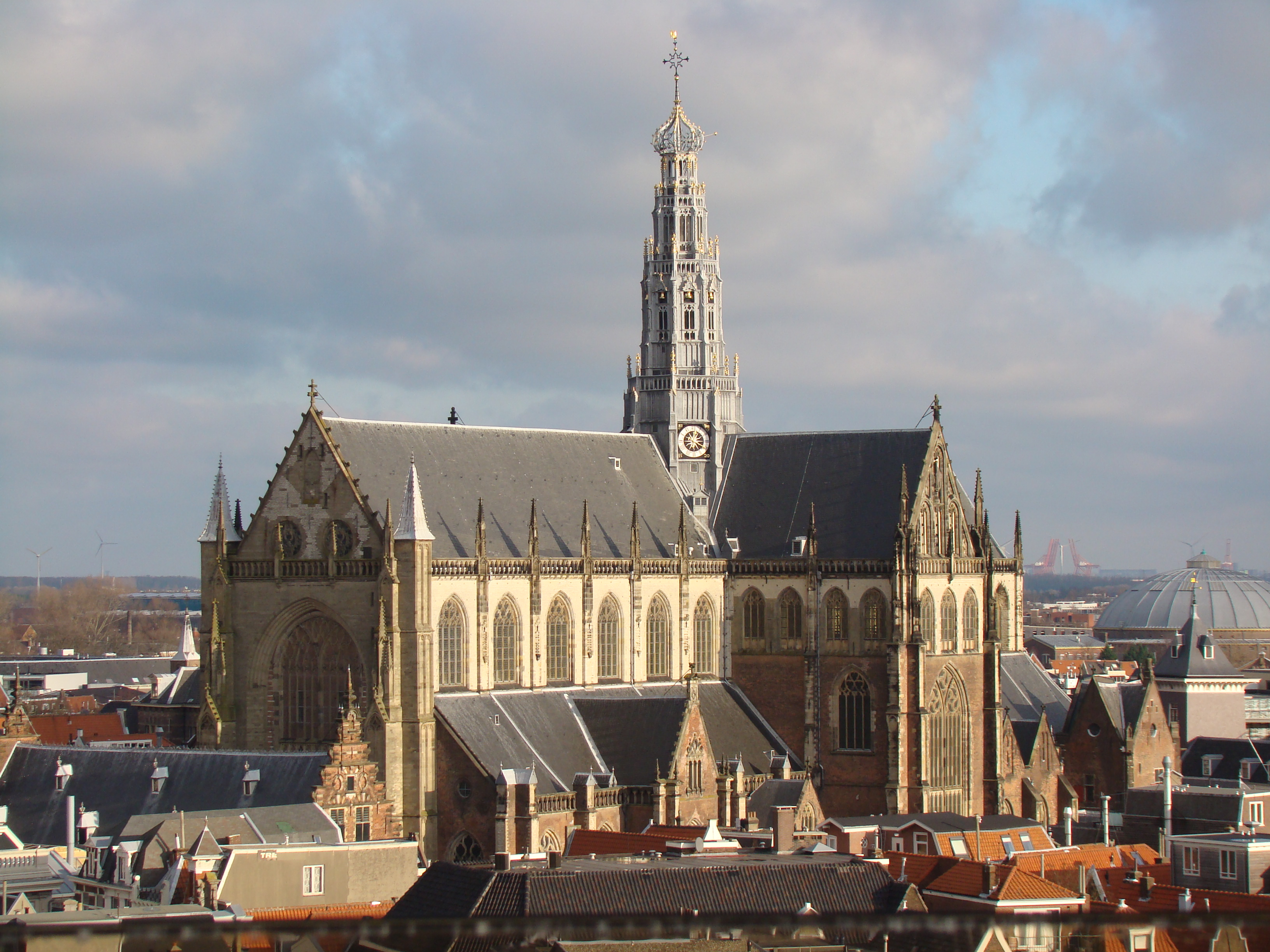
The church in 2009

== Contemporary References ==
The church is mentioned by Corrie ten Boom in her book, The Hiding Place.
