= The Lady of All Nations =

Catholic Marian title

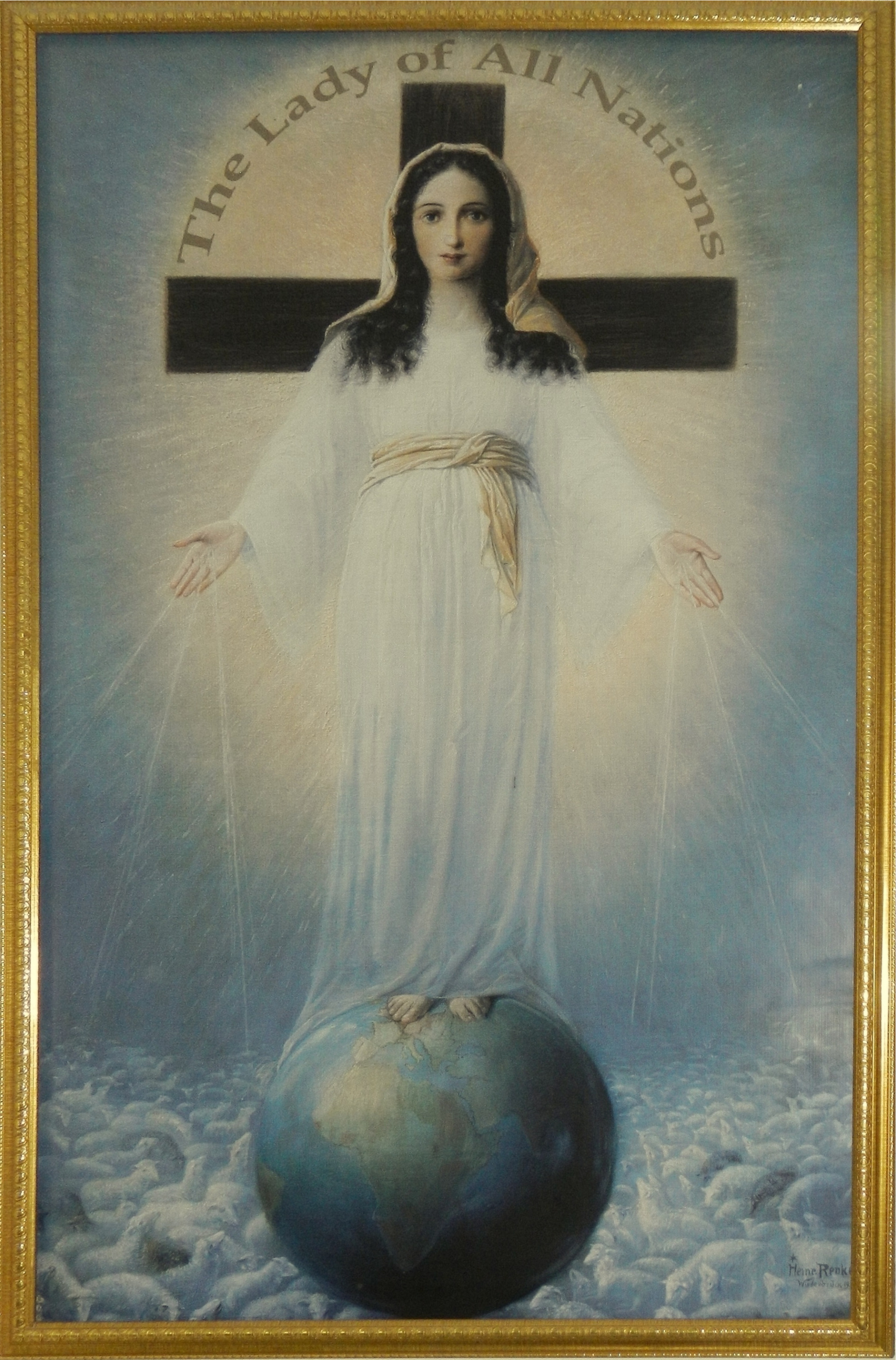
An English version of the painting by Heinrich Repke depicting The Lady, as described by Ida Peerdeman.

The Lady of All Nations is a Catholic Marian title sometimes associated with apparitions of the Blessed Virgin Mary to Ida Peerdeman of Amsterdam, Netherlands. Peerdeman claimed to have received 56 visions of the Lady from 1945 to 1959.

== The visionary ==
Ida Peerdeman
- Born: Isje Joanna Peerdeman; 13 August 1905; Alkmaar, Netherlands
- Died: 17 June 1996 (aged 90); Diepenbrockstraat, Amsterdam, Netherlands
- Burial place: Begraafplaats Sint Barbara, Amsterdam, Netherlands

Ida Peerdeman was born on 13 August 1905 in the city of Alkmaar, Netherlands, the youngest of five children. She was an ordinary woman who worked as a secretary in Amsterdam. On 25 March 1945, the unmarried Peerdeman, who at the time was with her sisters and a Dominican priest, Fr. Joseph Frehe, reported suddenly seeing a woman surrounded in light who identified herself as "The Lady" and "Mother", discussing future dates and the Rosary as well. The apparitions continued until 31 May 1959.

Peerdeman's movement received support from a member of the wealthy Brenninkmeijer family. In December 1979, The Lady of All Nations Foundation purchased property in Diepenbrockstraat, Amsterdam, which became the center of the apparition's cultus, and where Peerdeman came to reside. She spent the rest of her life promoting the messages she claimed to have received until her death on 17 June 1996.

== Messages ==
According to Peerdeman, the first apparition occurred at her Amsterdam home on 25 March 1945, the Feast of the Annunciation, when she saw a light from which a woman appeared. When Peerdeman asked the woman if she was Mary, the woman replied, "They will call me 'The Lady'." The initial twenty-five messages were generally apocalyptic pronouncements warning against dangers such as communism, atheism, and modernity. (Note: Margry notes that Catherine Labouré also reported warnings of calamities to befall France.)

After the promulgation of the dogma of the Assumption in 1950, the content of the messages changed. "On November 1, 1950, Pope Pius XII proclaimed the dogma of the Assumption of Mary into Heaven. This event constitutes a noteworthy point within the messages, for from here they take on a new direction. In this, the first message to follow the proclamation of the dogma, Mary calls herself 'The Lady of All Nations' for the first time. In the succeeding messages she dictates her prayer, draws attention to her image, and speaks for the first time about the final and greatest Marian dogma: Mary Co-redemptrix, Mediatrix and Advocate."

The Lady reportedly said that the definition of the Assumption had brought to a close the era of Marian dogmas having to do with Mary's earthly life, and that the "final and greatest" Marian dogma would be a definition of the heavenly role of the Lady of All Nations under the titles of "Co-redemptrix", "Mediatrix" and "Advocate". Supporters of this proposal refer to it as "the fifth Marian dogma," since it would theoretically follow the four existing dogmatic definitions of Mary as Mother of God (431); Perpetual Virgin (533), Immaculately Conceived (1854), and Assumed into Heaven (1950).

In February 1951, The Lady of the apparition reportedly began identifying herself in a different way: "I am the Lady, Mary, Mother of All Nations. You may say: The Lady of All Nations or Mother of All Nations, who once was Mary." The following month the lady said, "The whole world is degenerating, and because of this the Son is sending the Lady of All Nations, who once was Mary." In July, she explained, "'Who once was Mary" means: many people have known Mary as Mary. Now, however, in this new era which is about to begin, I wish to be the Lady of All Nations." Peerdeman's apparition messages cite the Gospel of John as the basis of this dual naming of Mary: "At the departure of the Lord Jesus Christ, He gave Miriam, or Mary, to the nations in one act, giving her as 'The Lady of All Nations'. For He spoke the words, 'Woman, behold your son; son, behold your mother.' One act, and by this Miriam, or Mary, received this new title."

The Lady asked a prayer be said throughout the world:

Lord Jesus Christ, Son of the Father, send now Your Spirit over the earth. Let the Holy Spirit live in the hearts of all nations, that they may be preserved from degeneration, disaster and war. May the Lady of All Nations, who once was Mary, be our Advocate. Amen.

The phrase "who once was Mary" was immediately controversial. Peerdeman's bishop revised the prayer to remove the phrase, but relented after Peerdeman reported that the Lady was not happy with this change. In 2005, the Congregation for the Doctrine of the Faith ordered that the phrase "who once was Mary" be replaced with the phrase "the Blessed Virgin Mary" for pastoral reasons.

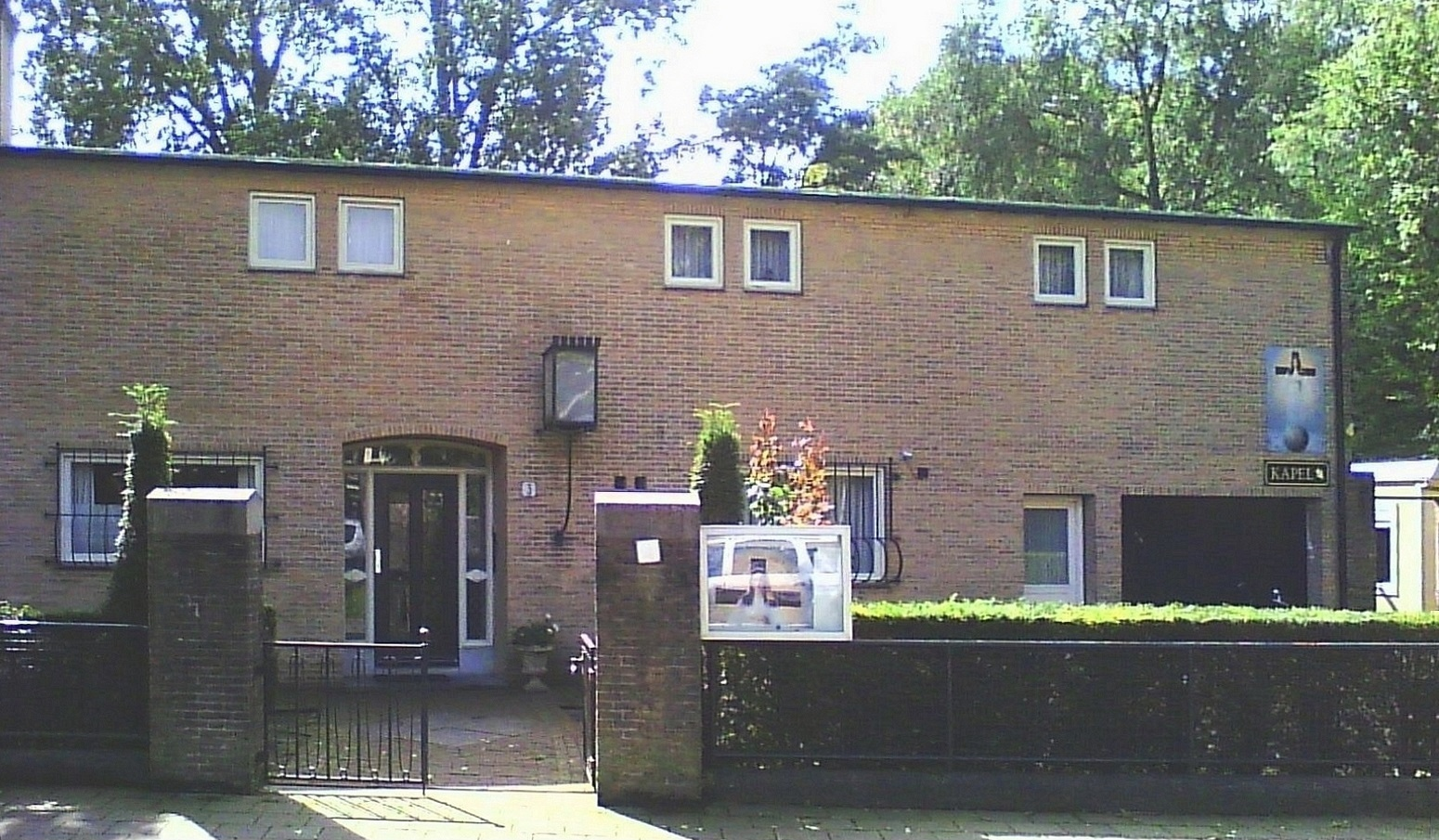
Chapel-Shrine of Our Lady of all Nations in Amsterdam, Netherlands.

== Development ==
The apparition directed that a picture of her be distributed throughout the world, and a painting was made in 1951 by artist Heinrich Repke. Small prints were widely disseminated. The picture depicts Mary standing in front of a large wooden cross, with Christ not represented. According to Margry, the image caused controversy by appearing to suggest that Mary had replaced Christ as Co-redemptrix. Adherents of the Amsterdam cultus began to press for the promulgation of the so-called "fifth dogma".

Despite a declaration by the Bishop of Haarlem that he "found no evidence of the supernatural nature of the apparitions", the movement continued to spread. In March 1973, the Canadian Marie-Paule Giguère, foundress of the Army of Mary, met Peerdeman in Amsterdam.

== Rulings by Church authorities ==
In the Catholic Church, the task of judging the supernatural character of an alleged apparition normally falls to the bishop of the diocese in which the apparition takes place, in this case, the Diocese of Haarlem-Amsterdam (formerly the Diocese of Haarlem).

- Bishop Johannes Huibers, who was bishop of Haarlem while the apparitions were taking place, gave his approval (nihil obstat) to the title and associated prayer. "On 7 May 1956, Bishop Huibers, following on a careful examination of the case concerning the supposed apparitions and revelations of 'Our Lady of All Nations', declared that he 'found no evidence of the supernatural nature of the apparitions'". The Vatican's Congregation for the Doctrine of the Faith (CDF) affirmed his position on 13 March 1957, on 24 May 1972, and 25 May 1974.
- On 31 May 1996, Bishop Hendrik Bomers, with permission from the CDF, permitted public veneration using the title, prayer, and image, while maintaining the questions on the supernatural character of the apparitions themselves as unresolved and left to the judgment of each believer's own conscience. He reiterated his support in a letter dated 3 December 1997.
- On 31 May 2002, Bishop Jozef Marianus Punt, Diocese of Haarlem-Amsterdam, declared the apparitions themselves to be of supernatural origin. Since then, there has been debate as to whether Bishop Punt had authority to overturn his predecessor's decision, which was confirmed by the CDF. (Note: In a presentation to the 22nd Mariological Congress in 2008, Msgr. Charles Scicluna, Promoter of Justice for the Congregation for the Doctrine of the Faith, cites the situation of The Lady of All Nations as an example case relating to his argument that "once a decision of the CDF is rendered on an alleged private revelation, the decision is of 'undisputed hierarchical authority', meaning a lower authority cannot overturn it.")
- In a letter dated August 8, 2005, the secretary of the CDF acknowledged "the said apparitions have received approval from His Excellency the Most Rev. Joseph Maria Punt," but expressed the CDF's request the prayer associated with the apparition be edited, replacing the words "who once was Mary" with "the Blessed Virgin Mary".
- In a letter dated 20 July 2020, under label Prot. N. 2353/20, sent from the Apostolic Nunciature to Lebanon to the Maronite Patriarch of Antioch Cardinal Bechara Boutros Rahi following his request for the official position of the Church on the Lady of all Nations devotion, and after asking clarification from the Congregation for the Doctrine of the Faith. The aforementioned Congregation pointed out the Notification published 25 May 1974 which affirmed Bishop Huibers' negative opinion, available on its webpage, is still valid today. It states that, after suitable study, "it did not consist of the supernatural nature of the apparitions". Therefore, the faithful are invited to "cease all propaganda about the alleged apparitions and revelations of the 'Lady of all Nations', and urged "to express their devotion to the Virgin saint as Queen of the Universe [...] with recognized forms recommended by the Church". A separate letter from the Congregation to the Catholic Bishops' Conference of the Philippines, dated May 20, 2005, does not contain anything suggesting a change of opinion by the Dicastery on the matter. All this well considered, the Congregation is of the opinion that it is not convenient to contribute to the spreading of the veneration of Mary as 'Lady of all Nations'.
- On 4 January 2021, Bishop Johannes Willibrordus Maria Hendriks of Haarlem-Amsterdam had issued a clarification on 30 December 2020 that "the Vatican's doctrinal office [has] urged Catholics not to promote 'the alleged apparitions and revelations' associated with the Marian title of 'Lady of all Nations'." Hendriks, who as the local bishop is primarily responsible for evaluating the apparitions, said he had decided to issue the statement after consulting with the CDF, which guides bishops in the discernment process.
- In light of ongoing interest and persistent doubts about the apparitions, the CDF, reorganised by Pope Francis in 2022 as the Dicastery for the Doctrine of the Faith, issued a press release on July 11, 2024 reaffirming the 1974 decision. This clarification, communicated by Cardinal Víctor Manuel Fernández, the current Prefect, serves to ensure the faithful and their pastors are well-informed about the Church’s official stance.

The reaffirmation of the Church’s position means that the devotion to “The Lady of All Nations” is not recognized as being of supernatural origin. People are thus advised to draw appropriate conclusions based on this official stance, adhering to the Church’s guidance on matters of faith and devotion.

== Commentary ==
Peerdeman's account was one of four apparitions claimed to have taken place in the Netherlands between 1937 and 1950. Dutch historian and ethnologist Peter Jan Margry sees the popular spread of the cultus arising from a reaction on the part of traditional or conservative believers (originally among Dutch Catholics), to the movement for renewal and liberalization in the Church during the 1970s.

== See also ==
- Community of the Lady of All Nations
