= Franciscus Jacobus van Vree =

Dutch Roman Catholic bishop (1807–1861)

Franciscus Josefus van Vree
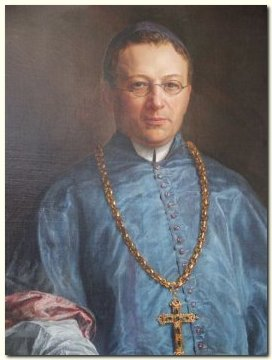
- Diocese: Roman Catholic Diocese of Haarlem
- See: St. Joseph Kerk, Haarlem
- Appointed: 4 March 1853
- Successor: Gerardus Petrus Wilmer
- Previous post(s): President of the Major Seminary, Warmond

Orders
- Ordination: 28 July 1831 by Kaspar Maximilian Droste zu Vischering
- Consecration: 15 May 1853 by Johannes Zwijsen

Personal details
- Born: 8 February 1807; Rhenoy, Gelderland, Kingdom of Holland
- Died: 31 January 1861 (aged 53); Haarlem, North Holland, Kingdom of the Netherlands
- Motto: Depositum custodi

Franciscus Josefus van Vree (8 February 1807 – 31 January 1861) was the first bishop of Haarlem after the re-establishment of Catholic dioceses in the Netherlands in 1853, and the third since the original founding of the bishopric in the 16th century.

== Life ==
Van Vree was born in Rhenoy, Gelderland, on 8 February 1807. After training as a priest and receiving ordination, he was sent to the junior seminary in Katwijk (established 1831) where he taught classical languages from 1836 to 1838, when he became headmaster. In 1842 the school was transferred to the Society of Jesus and Van Vree was appointed president of the Major Seminary in Warmond. He also founded and edited a monthly magazine, De Katholiek.

When the diocese of Haarlem was refounded on 4 March 1853, along with four other Dutch dioceses, Van Vree was appointed bishop. He took possession of the see on 22 April 1853, and was consecrated by Archbishop Johannes Zwijsen on 15 May 1853. Of the five new bishops appointed, he was the only one who had not already received episcopal consecration. In 1857 he made an ad limina visit to Rome, where he was ceremonially appointed to the household of Pope Pius IX. Van Vree died suddenly in 1861 at the age of 53, having served as bishop for eight years.
