= Cathedral of St Bavo, Haarlem =

Cathedral of St Bavo
- Kathedraal St. Bavo
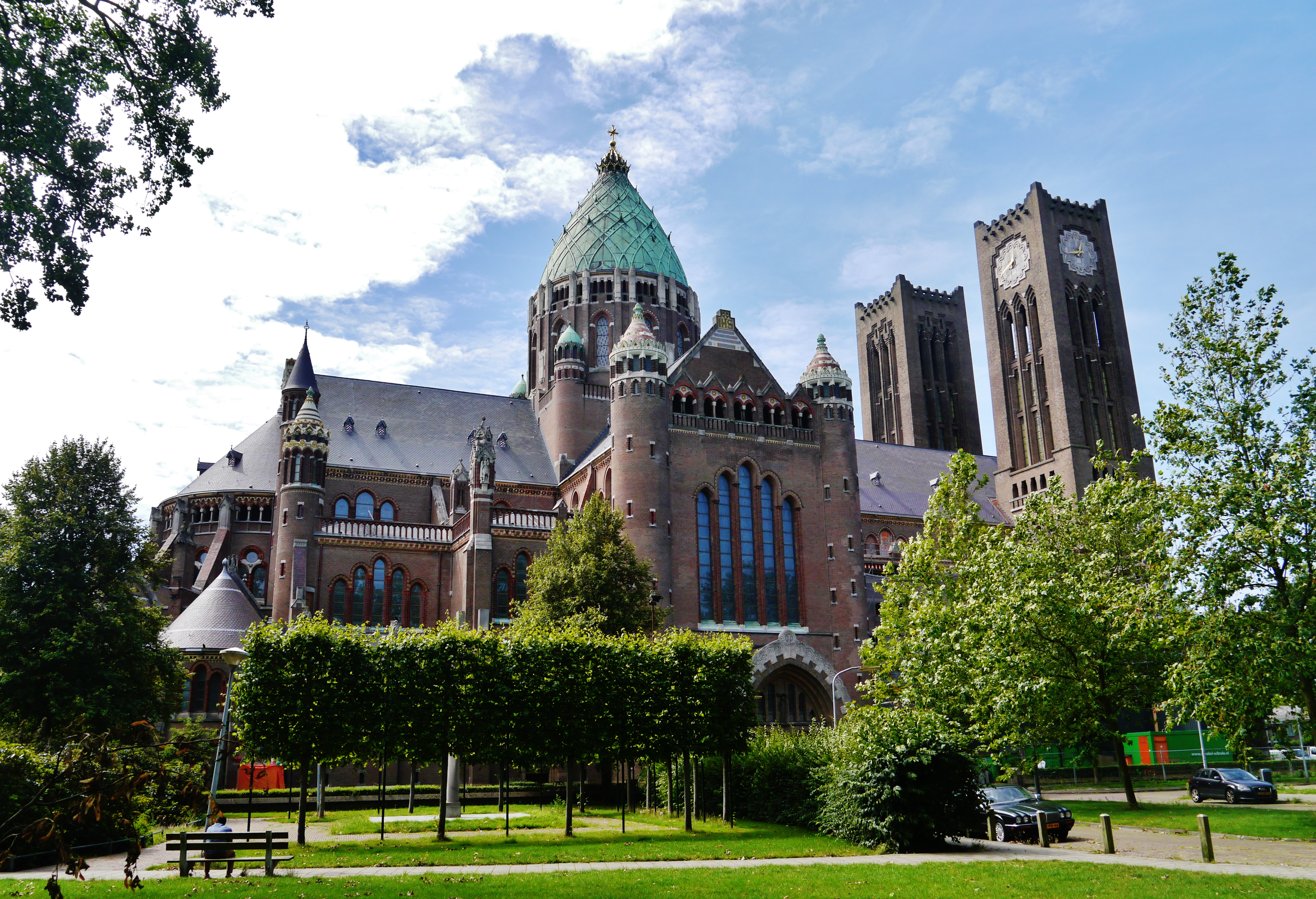

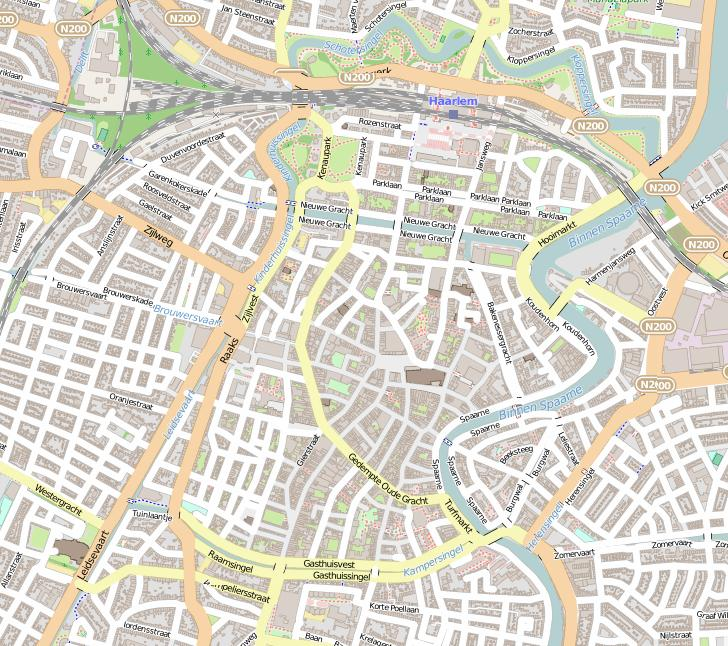
- Location in the center of Haarlem
- 52°22′36″N 4°37′20″E
- Location: Leidsevaart 146, Haarlem
- Country: Netherlands
- Denomination: Roman Catholic
- Website: www.rkhaarlem.nl www.koepelkathedraal.nl

History
- Status: Basilica, Cathedral, Parish church
- Dedication: Bavo of Ghent
- Dedicated: April 1, 1898

Architecture
- Functional status: Active
- Architect: Joseph Cuypers
- Architectural type: Cathedral
- Style: Neo-Baroque; Neo-Renaissance
- Years built: 1895-1930

Administration
- Diocese: Haarlem-Amsterdam
- Parish: Haarlem St Bavo

Clergy
- Bishop: Jos Punt

The Cathedral of Saint Bavo is a cathedral in Haarlem, the Netherlands, built by Joseph Cuypers from 1895 to 1930 to replace the former waterstaatskerk in the Jansstraat called the St. Joseph. That church was itself a replacement for the Sint-Bavokerk, that had been converted to Protestantism from Catholicism in 1578. The Cathedral of Saint Bavo now serves as the main cathedral for the Roman Catholic Diocese of Haarlem-Amsterdam. Within the cathedral, the former sacristy has been converted into a small museum (schatkamer) containing historical artefacts from Haarlem's Catholic past.

== History of the building ==
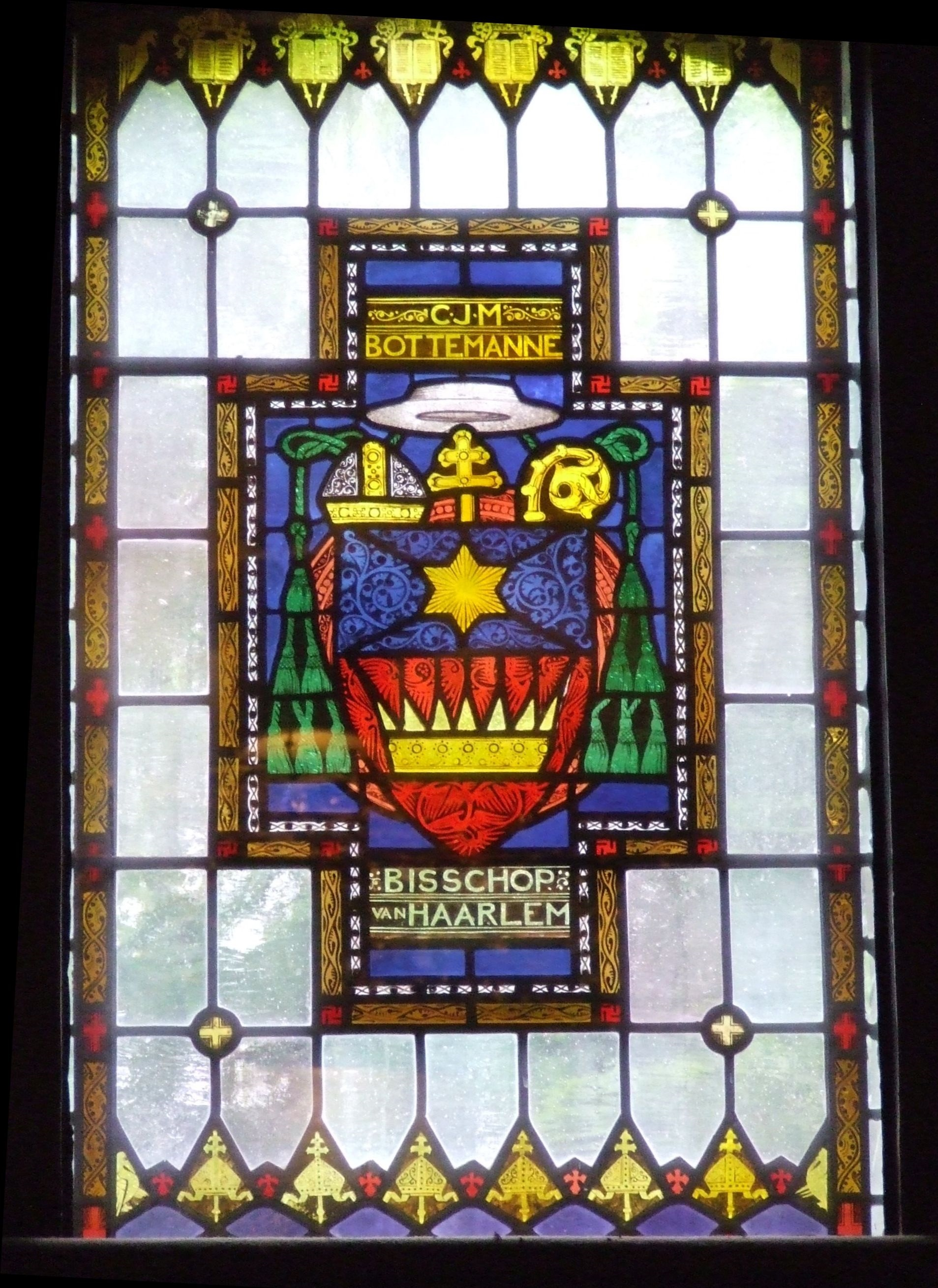
Stained glass in the cathedral with the coat of arms of founder Gaspard Bottemanne.

Since 1853 the church of St. Joseph served as a cathedral but it proved to be too small almost immediately, despite enlargements. Bishop Gaspard Bottemanne started the planning for building a new cathedral in 1893, which was to serve as a cathedral as well as a parish church. The original intention was to ask Pierre Cuypers to design the church, and it's possible he even made a first design, but due to his age his son, Joseph Cuypers, became the architect instead. Cuypers at first designed a church in a neo-gothic style that still clearly showed the influence of his father, but eventually, after numerous changes, Cuypers decided to focus on a neo-romanesque style instead, with influences from Byzantine and jugendstil architecture.

Construction started in 1895 with the choir and its radiating chapels, and on April 1, 1898, the cathedral was consecrated. In the years 1902 - 1906 construction continued with the transept and nave. Due to shortage of money the construction of the towers was postponed until 1927. In this period Cuypers was assisted by his son Pierre Cuypers Jr.

Despite the size of this cathedral, the former St. Josephs is still also a Catholic church, and there are several other catholic and former catholic churches in Haarlem. Today Haarlem has over 140 protected religious buildings, most of which have been converted for other uses.

== History of the collection ==
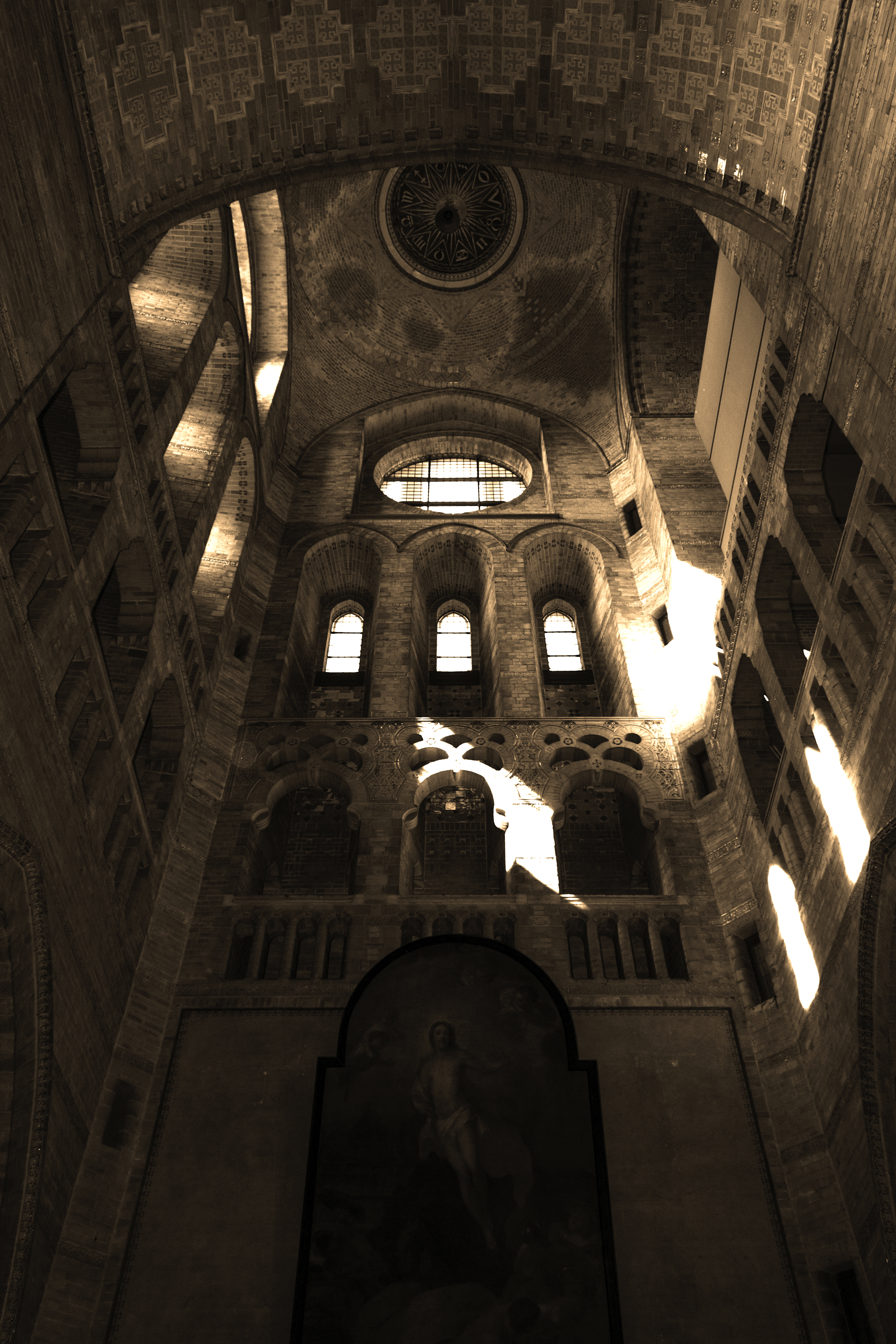
Women's tower of Saint Bavo Basilica.

Haarlem has had a Christian parish church since the 9th century. This first church was a filial church of Velsen, which itself was founded in 695 by Willibrord. It was a wooden church at the site of the current Grote Kerk on the Grote Markt. That church became formally a cathedral in 1559 when the first bishop Nicolaas van Nieuwland was appointed. Only 19 years later, after the Siege of Haarlem, the church was confiscated and converted to Protestantism as part of the Protestant Reformation. At this time most of the art and silver artefacts were also seized and what has survived is now in the collection of the Frans Hals Museum. The Haarlem Catholics took what they could carry with them and went underground. Since the Netherlands was officially no longer a Catholic nation, the underground Catholic places of worship were no longer called churches or kerken, but mission stations or staties. It is unknown how many staties existed in Haarlem at the end of the seventeenth century, but since town records show that these underground churches were tolerated and taxed by the Haarlem council in the eighteenth century, we can be certain that at least seven had more than 300 attendees for mass.

The station known as the St. Josephs statie met in a converted private home on the Goudsmitsplein until a Waterstaatskerk was built in 1853 in the Jansstraat behind the Grote Kerk, called the St. Joseph kerk. This church, with its formal exterior on the street, became the most popular Haarlem Catholic church. Slowly the other staties were closed in favor of this one Catholic church.

The various artefacts that survived from the Reformation, as well as from other defunct Haarlem catholic collections, have thus found their way into the collection and are now in the schatkamer, such as a 17th-century painting of the patron saint Bavo and silver from the chapel of Louis Napoleon, who resided for more than a decade at Villa Welgelegen. There are old chasubles, dalmatics, and surplices of the Haarlem clergy, richly embroidered, and showing popular Catholic themes. The French ones are probably also from the Louis Napoleon period, but the earliest are Flemish in origin and date back to the early 16th century.
