= Major Seminary, Warmond =

Catholic seminary in the Netherlands

Coordinates: 52.1995°N 4.5001°E

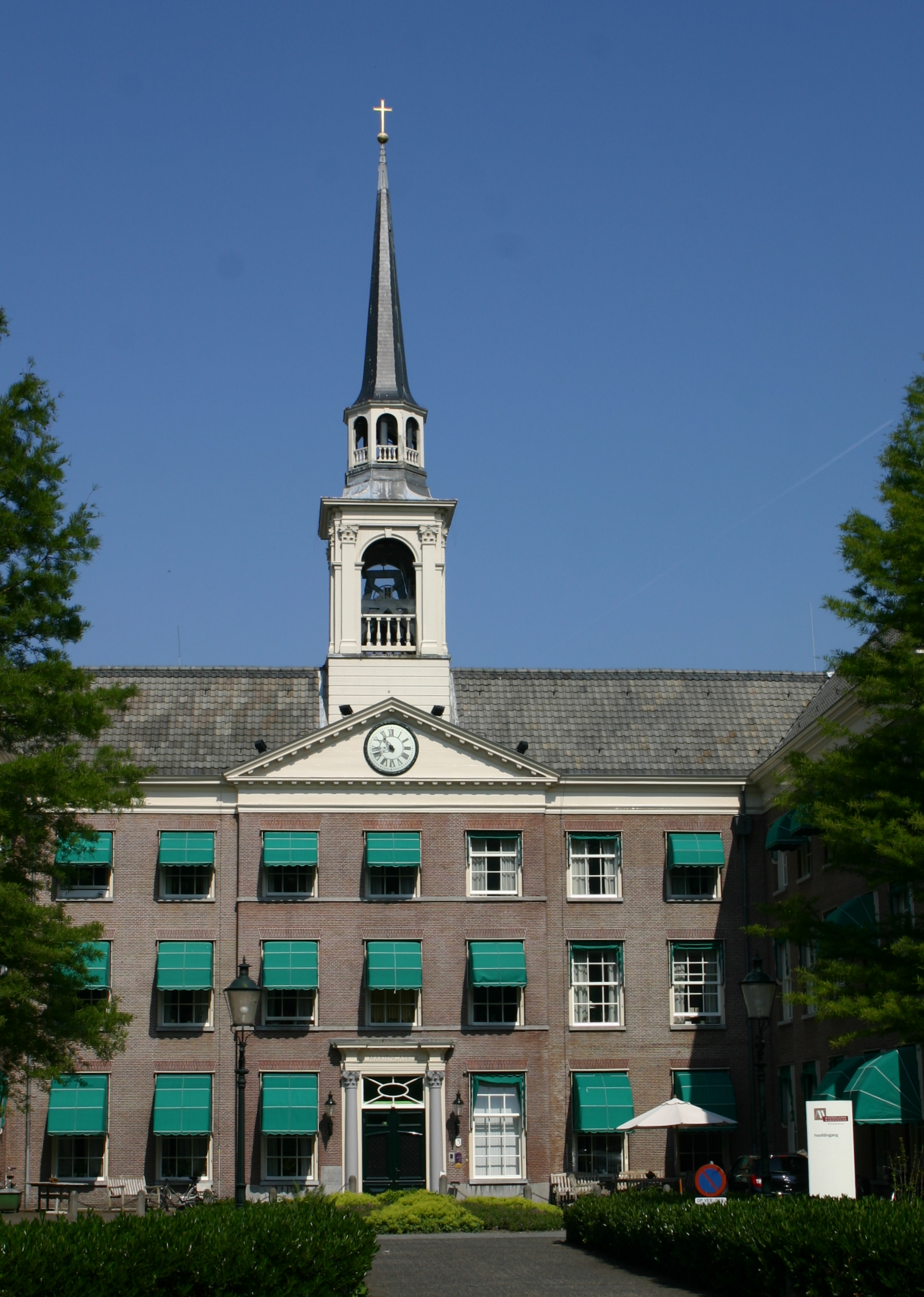

The Major Seminary, Warmond (Dutch: Grootseminarie Warmond) was one of the most important centres for the education of Roman Catholic clergy in the Netherlands from its establishment in 1799 until its closure in 1967. The building, which is partly a registered monument (Rijksmonument 38285), was then for some years used as a retirement home for the clergy and members of religious orders. Since 2017 it has been redeveloped into residential units, some as service flats.

== Notable students and staff ==
- Cardinal Simonis (student)
- Franciscus Jacobus van Vree, bishop of Haarlem (president, 1842–1853)
- Cardinal Willebrands (student)
