= Community of the Lady of All Nations =

Sect

The Community of the Lady of All Nations, also known as the Community of the Lady of All Peoples or the Army of Mary, is a Marian sect that has been condemned as heretical by the Catholic Church.

It was founded in 1971 by Marie-Paule Giguère in Quebec as a prayer group. It was formally approved as a Roman Catholic "pious association" in 1975, but was rescinded by the Archbishop of Quebec after Giguère announced herself the reincarnation of the Blessed Virgin Mary.

== History ==
Marie-Paule Giguère was born in Sainte-Germaine-du-Lac-Etchemin, Quebec, Canada on 14 September 1921. In 1944, she married Georges Cliche; they divorced in 1957. Their five children were placed out-of-home.

Marie-Paule claimed to have heard celestial voices since the age of twelve. After visiting a small Marian shrine on the edge of Lake Etchemin in 1971, Marie-Paule is said to have received a revelation directing her to creating an Army of Mary ("Armée de Marie") as an alternative to the existing Legion of Mary. Founded as a prayer group in 1971, it was recognized in 1975 by the Archbishop of Quebec as a pious association. A Quebec priest, Philippe Roy, joined the movement and became its spiritual director, and over the next ten years the association began to expand.

In 1971 Giguère learned from French author Raoul Auclair of alleged apparitions in Amsterdam and the purported messages of the Lady of All Nations. Giguère met visionary Ida Peerdeman in Amsterdam in 1973.

In 1977, due to another revelation to Marie-Paule, the "Militia of Jesus Christ" was introduced in Canada and connected to the Army of Mary. The Militia was a new chivalric order created in France in 1973 for stimulating Marian devotion and doing social work. A number of members of the "Army of Mary" joined the "Militia of Jesus Christ".

In 1978 Giguère introduced herself as the (mystical) reincarnation of Mary. Giguère published her spiritual writings ("Vie d'amour") in 1979. In 1981, the "Army of Mary" movement changed its name to the "Family and the Community of the Sons and Daughters of Mary", and in 1983 began construction at Lac-Etchemin of a world center for the Army of Mary and the Militia.

At present, the Community of the Lady of All Nations declares itself separate from the Church and non-Catholic. It is an independent Neo-Marian, ecumenical group, open to interreligious dialogue. Its liturgy integrates "The Heritage of Humanity" (excerpts from books and sacred texts of other religions and thinkers).

After a series of newspaper articles regarding the beliefs expressed in her writings, the new Archbishop of Quebec, Cardinal Louis-Albert Vachon, withdrew the approval of his predecessor, and on 4 May 1987 declared the movement schismatic and disqualified it as a Catholic association due to its false teachings. He asked the Congregation for the Doctrine of the Faith to review Giguère's writings. Then-Cardinal Ratzinger (later Pope Benedict XVI) concluded that the movement was in "major and very severe error". The Army was forbidden to organize any celebration or to propagate their devotion to The Lady of All Nations.

On April 25, 2015, Giguère died in the Residence of the Lady in Lac-Etchemin.

== Beliefs ==
Members of the group believe their late foundress Giguère was the reincarnation of the Virgin Mary. This has caused controversy as it is contradictory to the Catholic belief that there is no reincarnation, and the dogma that Mary was assumed body and soul into heaven by God. Therefore, Mary's soul is inseparable from her body and were she to appear, it would be as herself and not as a reincarnation.

Father Eric Roy, superior-general of the Sons of Mary (an affiliate of the "Army of Mary") said Giguère did not claim to be the reincarnation of the Virgin Mary, and that the Québécois woman "received graces" from the Virgin Mary and God. According to Roy, "The Virgin Mary took possession of her soul. I would rather say it that way."

== Position of the Catholic Church ==
On February 27, 1987, the Congregation of the Doctrine of the Faith declared the writings of the movement to be in "major and severe error".

=== Canada ===
In June 2001, the Canadian Conference of Catholic Bishops issued a negative doctrinal judgement stating that the group was not a "Catholic association". The bishops cited "spurious new doctrines that are without foundation in Scripture or Tradition". On 26 March 2007 the Archbishop of Quebec, Cardinal Marc Ouellet, declared that "The Army of Mary has clearly and publicly become a schismatic community and, as such, a non-Catholic association. Its particular teachings are false and its activities are not able to be frequented nor supported by Catholics".

On July 11, 2007, the Congregation for the Doctrine of the Faith issued a declaration of excommunication against the group for heretical teachings and beliefs after a six-year investigation. The declaration was announced by the Canadian Conference of Catholic Bishops on September 12, 2007. Archbishop of Ottawa, Terrence Prendergast, appointed mediator in 2003 by Pope John Paul II, said "It’s a kind of cult. I think they are very much under the sway of the foundress."

=== United States ===
On September 28, 2007, Msgr. J. Gaston Hebert, apostolic administrator of the Diocese of Little Rock in the United States (per the July 11 Congregation for the Doctrine of the Faith) stated that six nuns in the jurisdiction were excommunicated for heresy (the first in the diocese's 165-year history). The six nuns, members of the Good Shepherd Monastery of Our Lady of Charity and Refuge in Hot Springs, refused to recant the doctrines of the Community of the Lady of All Nations (Army of Mary); one of them, Sister Mary Theresa Dionne, 82, said they will still live on convent property, which they own.

A spokesman for the Army of Mary called the excommunication of the nuns and other members of the sect an injustice.

== Literature ==
- Peter Jan Margry, 'Mary’s Reincarnation and the Banality of Salvation. The Millennialist Cultus of the Lady of All Nations/Peoples', in: Numen. International Review for the History of Religions 59 (2012) 486-508.

== See also ==
- The Lady of All Nations
