= Theodor Homann =

German footballer and manager

Personal information
- Date of birth: 28 April 1948
- Place of birth: Werne, Germany
- Date of death: 12 April 2010 (aged 61)
- Place of death: Werne, Germany
- Height: 1.78 m (5 ft 10 in)
- Position: Midfielder

Youth career
- SpVgg Werne

Senior career*
Years	Team	Apps	(Gls)
1968–1969	1. FC Nürnberg	0	(0)
1969–1971	VfR Mannheim		
1971–1972	Westfalia Herne		
1973–1977	Wuppertaler SV	55	(4)
- * Club domestic league appearances and goals

Theodor Homann (28 April 1948 – 12 April 2010) was a German footballer, coach and businessman. He played for 1. FC Nürnberg, VfR Mannheim, Westfalia Herne and Wuppertaler SV. He died unexpectedly of heart failure. He was married and had a daughter. He was born and died in Werne.
