= Kurtulus Öztürk =

German footballer

Personal information
- Date of birth: 7 April 1980 (age 46)
- Place of birth: Werne, Germany
- Height: 1.72 m (5 ft 8 in)
- Position: Right-back

Youth career
- 1996-1999: Borussia Dortmund

Senior career*
Years	Team	Apps	(Gls)
1999–2005	Borussia Dortmund II	67	(3)
2000–2002	→ Adanaspor (loan)	20	(0)
2002–2003	→ Diyarbakırspor (loan)	5	(0)
2003–2004	→ Yozgatspor (loan)	6	(0)
2005–2006	FC Gütersloh 2000	34	(0)
2006–2007	SV Lippstadt	12	(1)
2007–2008	Preußen Münster	23	(0)
2008–2009	1. FC Kleve	6	(0)
2009–2010	SC Verl	5	(0)
2010–2012	Hammer SpVg	0	(0)
2012–2013	SV Holzwickede	1	(0)

International career
1997	Turkey U17	3	(0)
1997	Turkey U18	2	(0)

Managerial career
- 2013–2017: Werner SC
- * Club domestic league appearances and goals

Kurtulus Öztürk (Turkish: Kurtuluş Öztürk, born 7 April 1980) is a former professional footballer who played as a right-back. Born in Germany, he represented Turkey internationally.

== Playing career ==
Öztürk began his footballing careers with the youth academy of Borussia Dortmund. He then joined Adanaspor on loan in the Turkish Süper Lig, where he was coached by Joachim Löw. He spent most of his career in the amateur leagues of Germany before retiring in 2013. He then started working as a manager for his hometown club Werner FC.
