= Werne =

- Town
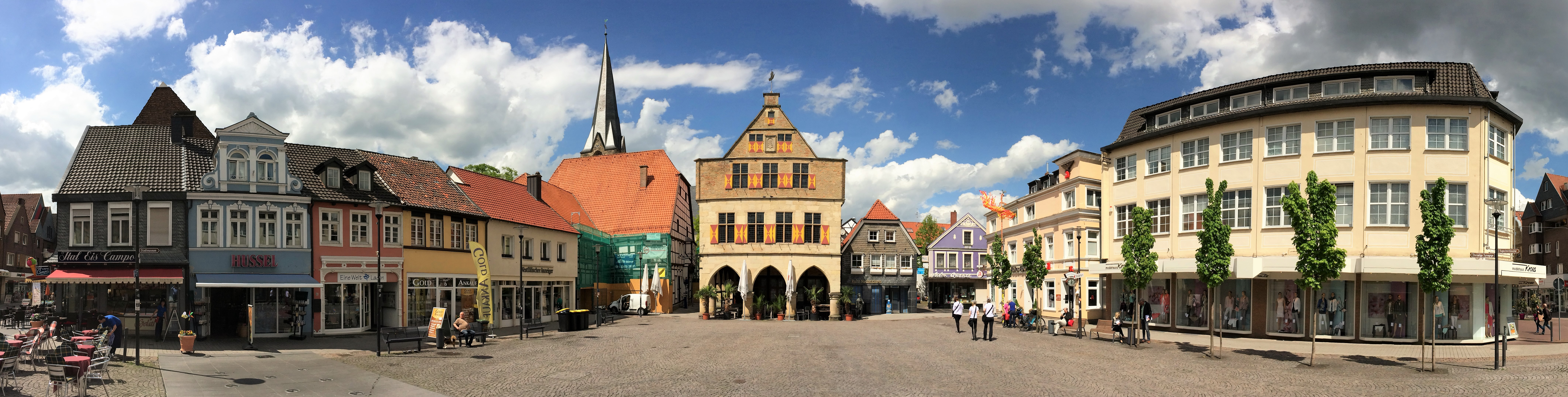
- Market square

- Flag Coat of arms

- Location of Werne within Unna district
- Interactive map of Werne
- Location within Germany Location within North Rhine-Westphalia
- Coordinates: 51°40′N 7°37′E
- Country: Germany
- State: North Rhine-Westphalia
- Admin. region: Arnsberg
- District: Unna

Government
  - Mayor (2020–25): Lothar Christ (Ind.)

Area
  - Total: 76.14 km^{2} (29.40 sq mi)
- Elevation: 60 m (200 ft)

Population (2025-12-31)
  - Total: 30,034
  - Density: 394.5/km^{2} (1,022/sq mi)
- Time zone: UTC+01:00 (CET)
  - Summer (DST): UTC+02:00 (CEST)
- Postal codes: 59368
- Dialling codes: 0 23 89
- Vehicle registration: UN
- Website: www.werne.de

Werne an der Lippe (German pronunciation: [ˈvɛʁnə]; Westphalian: Wäen) is a town in the Federal state of North Rhine-Westphalia in the Unna district in Germany. It is located on the southern edge of the Münsterland region near the Ruhrgebiet. The population of Werne was about 30,000 in 2024.

== History ==
=== Middle Ages and early modern period ===
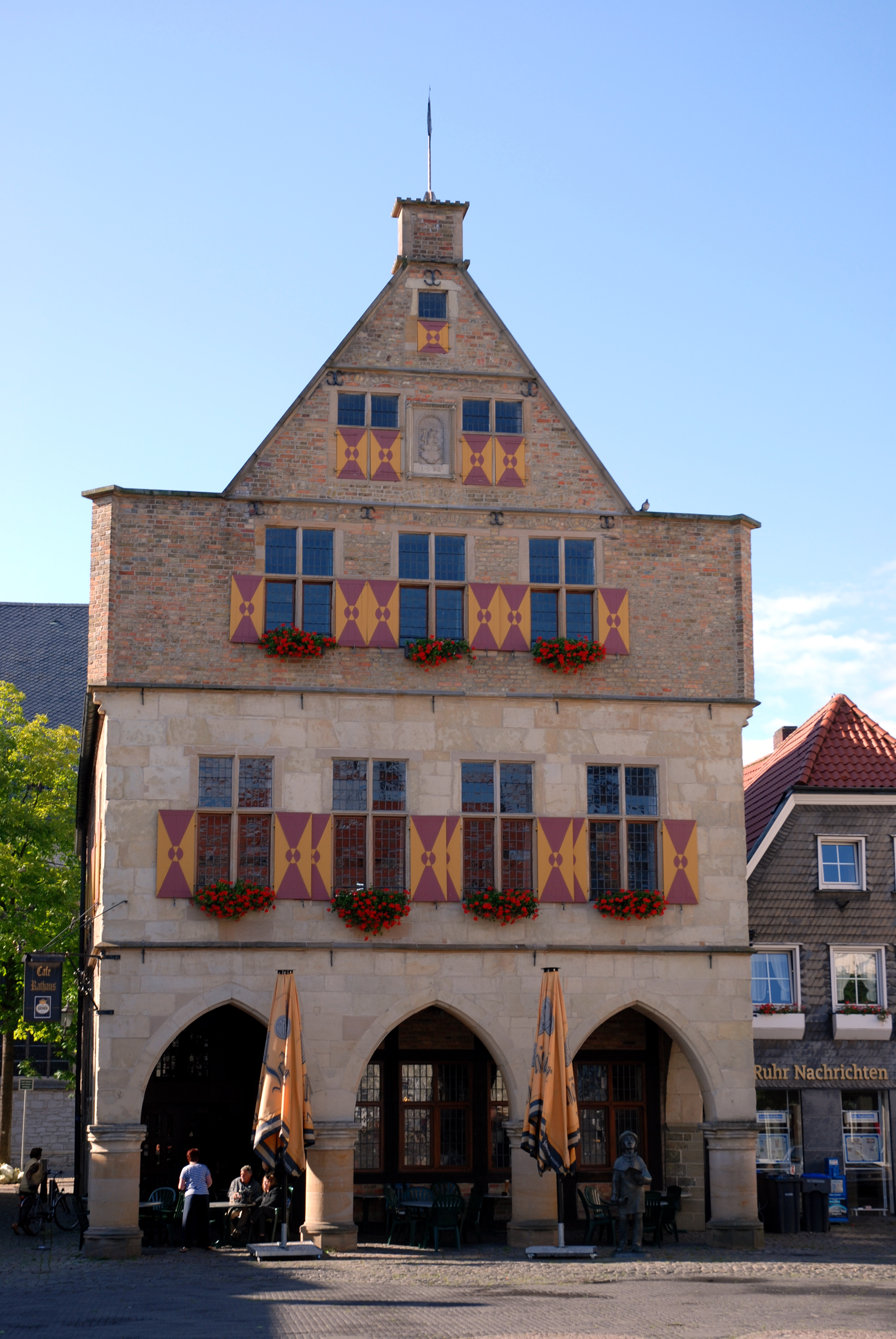
The Old Town Hall in Werne

The first Bishop of Münster, Liudger established Werne as a parish by erecting a chapel in the southern parts of the Dreingau ("in pago dreginni"). He acted on orders of Charlemagne who, having finally brought the region under the fold of Francia following the conclusion of the Saxon Wars, was eager to press on with Christianization. The Latin text of the oldest preserved document ("in villa quae dicitur werina"), which dates from 834 and is being kept at the Leiden University Library, indicates that by this time a village had already formed around the chapel.

Traders and peasants continued to accrete throughout the next three centuries. At some point between the years 1192 and 1195, the regional bishopric established a customs agency at Werne and put the place under its direct jurisdiction. The year 1253 found Werne in an alliance (the "Werner Bund") with the cities of Münster, Dortmund, Soest and Lippstadt to defend transit and trading rights relating to a bridge over the Lippe river. In 1470 Werne became a member of the Hanseatic League. A town hall was built from 1512 to 1561.

The first moves towards a fortification of Werne date to 1302 when a trench was dug around the church; this was improved and extended to protect the entire settlement in 1383, two years before it received town privileges in 1385. After Adolph I, Duke of Cleves had burned Werne to the ground in 1400, the full fortification of the town commenced in 1415. However, this did not prevent occupation, looting and torching of the town on several occasions during the Thirty Years' War and of course it was no help at all against the Black Death, which killed 313 people (out of a population of about 1,000) in 1636 and 1637 while the war still raged. (Parts of the town wall and some of the towers were pulled down in 1779; the last town gate (the "Neutor") was demolished in 1843.)

The Peace of Westphalia, signed in 1648 at the nearby cities of Münster and Osnabrück, had essentially expelled Protestantism from the Werne region. From 1671 to 1673 the Order of Friars Minor Capuchin erected a monastery and, from 1677 to 1681, the Catholic Church. (The Martin Luther Church at the Wichernstraße dates from 1904).

=== From the Napoleonic time to industrialization ===
Werne, which had come under the administration of Prussia in 1803 when the Prince-Bishopric of Münster had been dissolved, was attached to the Grand Duchy of Berg by Napoleon in 1806. The Congress of Vienna restored the town to Prussia which incorporated it with other territories into its Province of Westphalia. In 1831 was granted a degree of administrative independence under the Prussian municipal code of 1831.

In 1873 and 1874 the search for coal produced a brine thermal spring, and the Werne Baths were established in 1878. The actual coal mine did not commence operations before 1899; it was operated until 1975. Today the buildings of the "Zeche Werne" have been converted to public meeting places, or are part of a business park.

The railway line Münster-Werne-Dortmund was opened in 1928. It had taken a significant amount of lobbying to get Werne a railway station, which was totally refurbished in 2005.

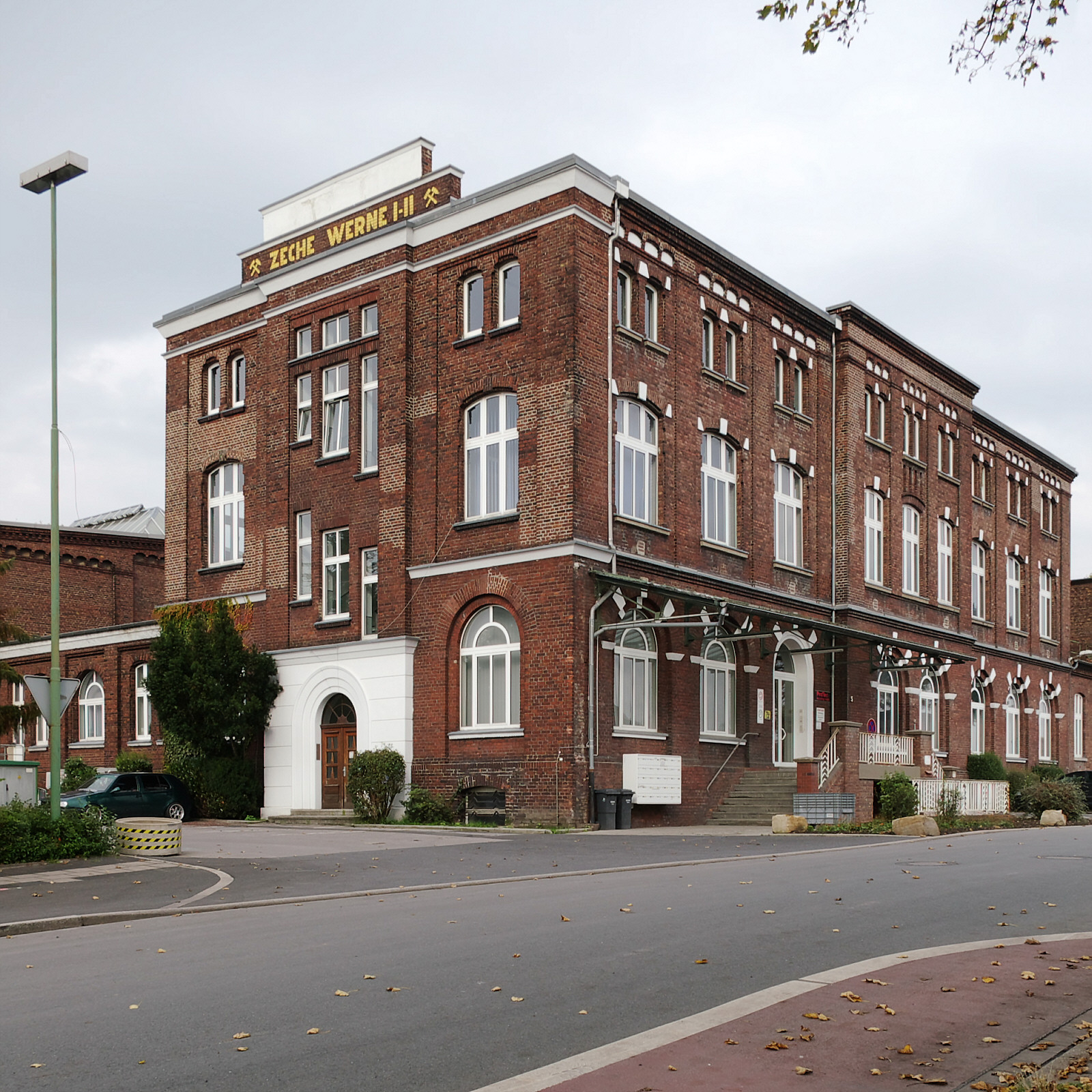
A repurposed building of the former "Zeche Werne"

=== World War II ===
During the war, 471 citizens of Werne died and 500 more disappeared without trace. The town accommodated nearly 4,000 refugees.

=== Post-war ===
In 1967, a comprehensive urban renewal project began, which was largely completed with the official opening of the pedestrian zone in June 1982.

The new town hall, the restored old town hall, and the new fire station were completed and handed over to the public in 1973 and 1974. The hospital building on Goetheweg, still in use today, was built in 1974.

On 1 January 1975, the municipal reorganization came into effect: The district of Lüdinghausen was dissolved, Werne was assigned to the district of Unna and the administrative region of Arnsberg.

The previously independent municipality of Stockum was incorporated into Werne. The city's population increased to 25,500 with the addition of approximately 4,000 new residents from Stockum.

In 1975, the Werne coal mine closed. Before the start of the coal crisis, it had employed around 4,000 people, and most recently, 2,000.

On 19 March 1976, following a council resolution, the city dropped the suffix "a. d. Lippe" (at the Lippe) and has since been called Werne again, as had been the tradition since the Middle Ages. In 2006, a proposal to reinstate the suffix failed to gain a majority in the city council. However, the suffix "an der Lippe" is to be used primarily in tourism promotion and city marketing activities.

In 1980/81, the Karl Pollender City Museum with the city archives was opened. The city library in the Old Moormann Stone House reopened in 1983. After a complete renovation, the natural brine bath was finally reopened in 1988. In 1991, a graduation tower was built in the city park by the city lake. The old brine bath closed at the beginning of 2015. The old bath was demolished and replaced by a new building, which opened at Easter 2019.

== Population ==
The population of the town of Werne (and the ward of Stockum) increased from 1974 to 2003 by about 23%. The proportion of foreigners was about five percent in 2003. In the same year, the ward of Stockum with 4,760 inhabitants presented 14.6% of the population of Werne. The proportion of the Catholic population amounted to 57.4%, the proportion of the Protestant population to 25.0%. 17.6% had no religious affiliation or belonged to another faith.

Historical population

Year	Pop.	±% p.a.
1965	23,596	—
1970	24,999	+1.16%
1975	25,537	+0.43%
1980	26,654	+0.86%
1985	28,065	+1.04%
1990	29,484	+0.99%
1995	30,456	+0.65%

Year	Pop.	±% p.a.
2000	30,825	+0.24%
2005	30,695	−0.08%
2010	29,901	−0.52%
2015	29,955	+0.04%
2020	29,588	−0.25%
2025	30,034	+0.30%

Source: Landesdatabank Nordrhein-Westfalen

== Major Companies ==
The city's largest employer is the Amazon logistics center, which opened in 2010. During the peak season before Christmas, up to 4,000 people work here.

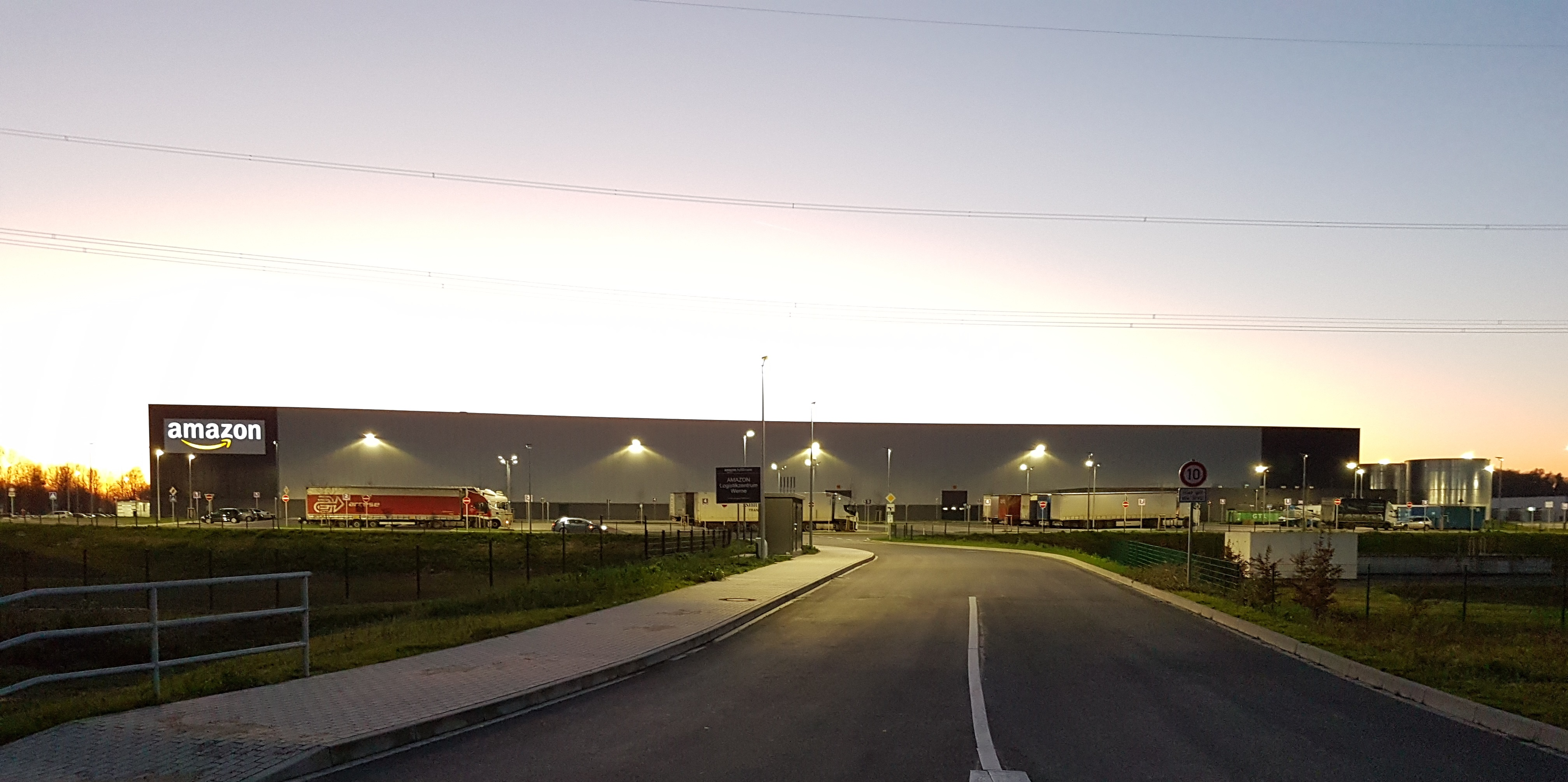
Amazon Logistics Center

- PTR Messtechnik GmbH & Co. KG
- AB Elektronik GmbH
- Böcker Maschinenwerke GmbH
- Hörmann KG Werne – Gates, Doors, Frames, Drives
- RWE Power AG
- Klingele Paper & Packaging SE & Co. KG – Corrugated Board Plant Werne
- Amazon Logistics Center
- L. Stroetmann Großverbraucher GmbH & Co. KG
- Sparkasse an der Lippe – public bank
- Open Grid Europe – Gas compressor station
- RCS GmbH – Entsorgungsfachbetrieb – waste disposal
- Uniferm – Baking yeast and other baking ingredients
- The chemical-pharmaceutical factories HEFA GmbH and Frenon-Arzneimittel GmbH were also located in Werne.

== Education and culture ==
=== Schools ===
- Gymnasium St. Christophorus
- Anne-Frank-Gymnasium, municipal high school
- Freiherr-vom-Stein vocational school
- Marga-Spiegel-Schule, comprehensive school since August 2012, named after Marga Spiegel, a holocaust survivor
- Kardinal-von-Galen school, catholic primary school in Werne-Stockum
- Uhlandschule, catholic primary school
- Wiehagenschule, catholic primary school (also open day school)
- Familienbildungsstätte
- Folk high school Werne

=== Stages ===
- Sylvan theatre Werne
- Kolpinghaus Werne

=== Museums ===
- Karl Pollender town museum

=== Libraries ===
- Town library

== Notable people ==
- Hinrik Funhof († 1485), painter
- Theodor Brüggemann (1796-1866), politician
- Albert von Maybach (1822-1904), lawyer, politician and railway manager
- Antonie Jüngst (1843-1918), writer
- Heinrich Repke (1877-1962), painted
- Hans-Martin Linde (born 1930), classical flautist
- Dietrich Schwanitz (1940–2004), writer and literature scientist
- Theodor Homann (1948–2010), footballer
- Gabriele Behler (born 1951), politician, former minister of North Rhine-Westphalia
- Lars Müller (born 1976), footballer
- Kurtulus Öztürk (born 1989), footballer
- Nikolas Katsigiannis (born 1982), handball player
- Mehmet Kara (born 1983), footballer
- Marvin Pourié (born 1991), footballer

== Twin towns – sister cities ==
Werne is twinned with:

- Bailleul, France (1967)
- Lytham St Annes, England, United Kingdom (1984)
- Kyritz, Germany (1990)
- Wałcz, Poland (1992)
- Poggibonsi, Italy (2000)
