= Heinrich Repke =

German painter

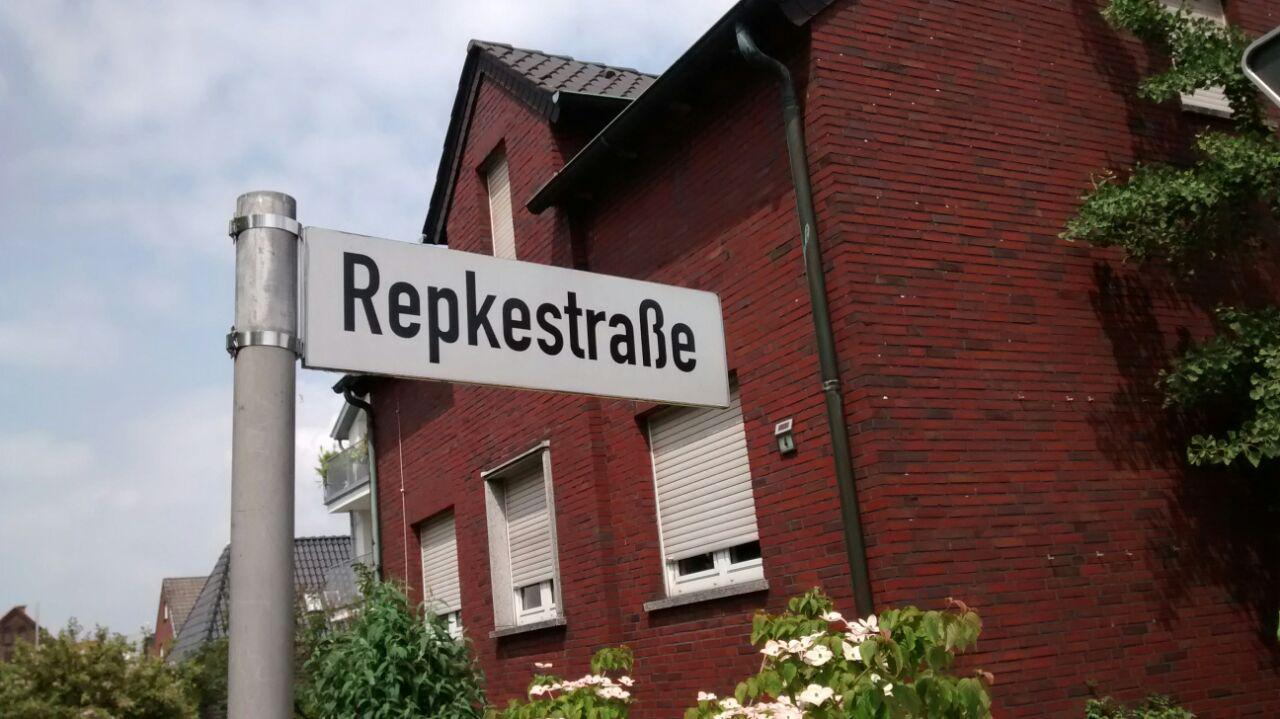
Repke Street in Werne

Heinrich Repke (b. 31 March 1877 in Werne, d. 25 December 1962 in Wiedenbrück) was a German painter. He belonged to the Wiedenbrücker Schule school of arts.

Until 1895, Heinrich Repke was trained as an ornamental painter in the studio of Georg Goldkuhle in Wiedenbrück. He was trained as a portrait painter in the same studio before studying at the Dusseldorf Academy of Arts in 1899. He already returned to Wiedenbrück in 1900 though in order to finish the works of his deceased master Georg Goldkuhle. In 1907, Repke opened a studio for religious art.

In the time of National Socialism, four of his paintings (one peasant painting, three still lifes) were exhibited at the Great German Arts Exhibition in Munich. Adolf Hitler bought the peasant painting Der weiße Truthahn (The White Turkey) for a price of 750 reichsmark in 1938, and Robert Ley acquired the still life Schläft ein Lied in allen Dingen (There's a song sleeping in all things) for 3,000 reichsmark in 1942.

Repke's son Willi (b. 1911, d. 2009) was a painter as well and is considered the last representative of the Wiedenbrücker Schule school of arts.

In Rheda-Wiedenbrück and in Werne, streets are named after Repke.

== Works ==
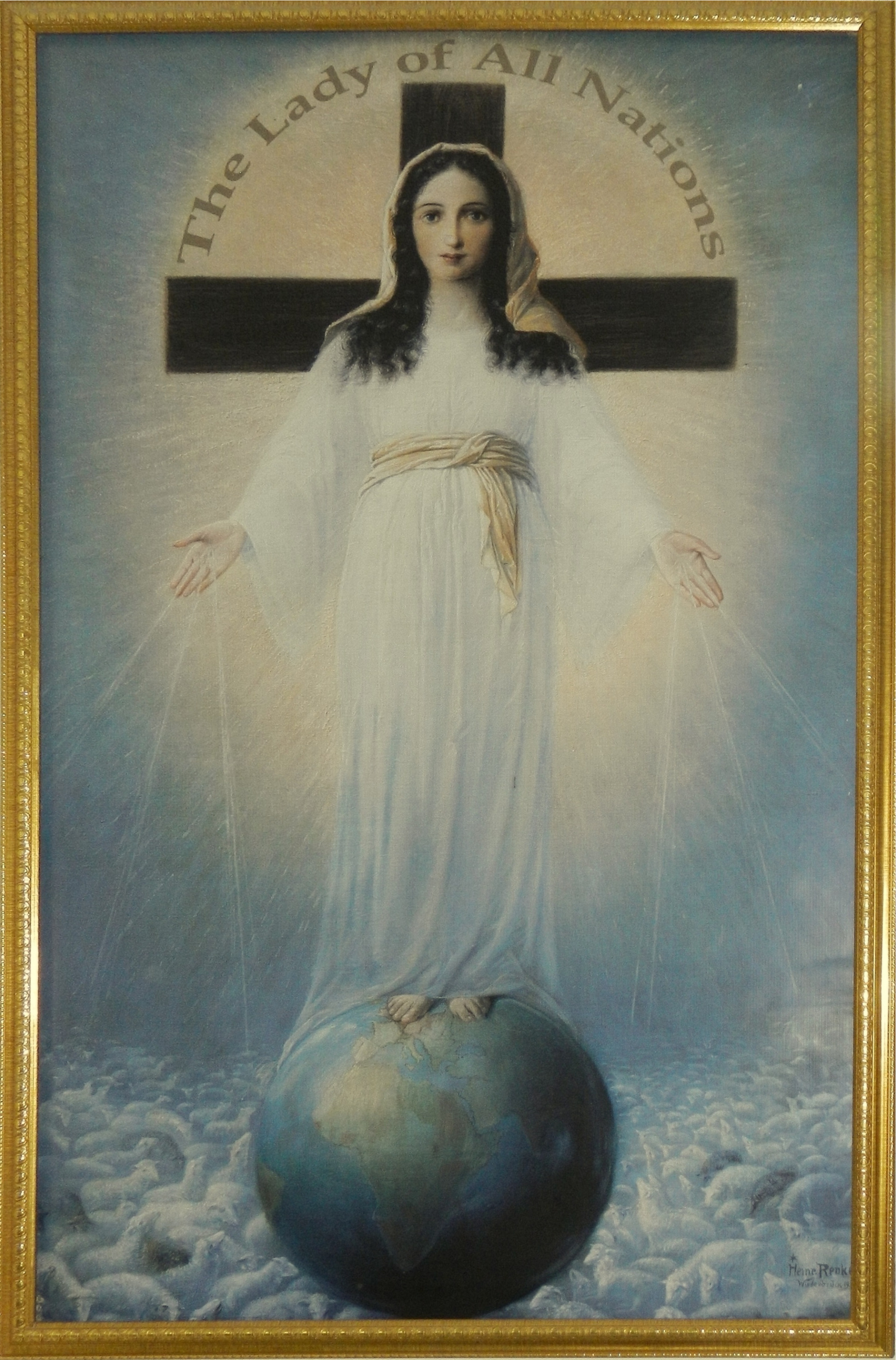
Copy of the picture The Lady of All Nations in Norzagaray, Philippines; his signature can be seen on bottom right: Heinr. Repke / Wiedenbrück 1951

Works by Heinrich Repke can be found in numerous churches. Among others, in:

- Oldenzaal (Netherlands): Plechelmus Basilica
- Denekamp (Netherlands): St. Nicholas Church
- Lette, Oelde: parish church St. Vitus, (paintings "Christ on the Cross" and "Christ with the disciples in Emmaus")
- Brambauer, Lünen: parish church Herz-Jesu, (painting "Christ the King") in the left aisle of the church
- Hörde, Dortmund: St. Clara Collegiate Church (14 Stations of the Cross)

In 1951 he painted the image of the Lady of All Nations, which currently hangs in the Chapel of the Lady of All Nations, Amsterdam, based on the controversial guidelines of the Dutch visionary Ida Peerdeman.

The privately owned picture "Gedembergmühle in Werne" was given in 2020 to the Museum of the City of Werne.

== Sources ==
- Antess, Isolde; Plassmann, Otmar (1996). "(exh. cat)". Heinrich Repke: Gemälde, Entwürfe, Studien. Volksbank Paderborn.
