= Antonie Jüngst =

German writer and poet (1843–1918)

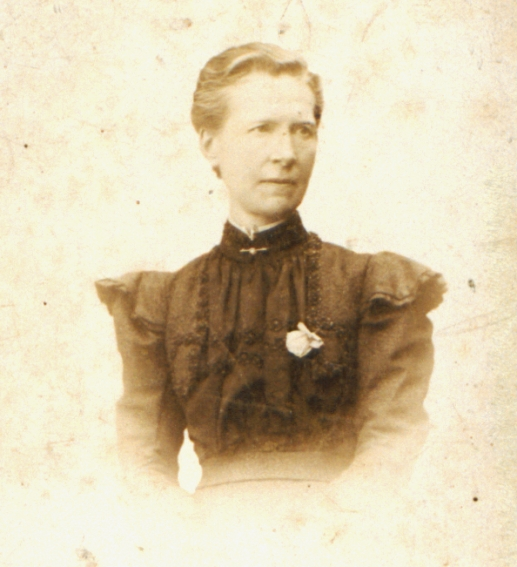
Antonie Jüngst (undated)

Antonie Jüngst (June 13, 1843 – June 8, 1918) was a Westphalian writer and poet.

== Life ==
Antonie Jüngst was born in Werne on June 13, 1843. She was a great-granddaughter of the law professor Wolrad Burchardi. After the early death of her parents, she came into the family of the councillor of justice Crone, who initially lived in Rheine, later in Münster. She was sent to the Ursulines at St. Leonhard in Aachen for her education. Back in Münster, she received a great deal of inspiration, especially from the poet and philosopher Christoph Bernhard Schlüter, the friend of Annette von Droste-Hülshoff.

With her foster parents, and after the death of her foster father with her mother alone, she traveled extensively to Switzerland, Thuringia and Italy. She turned these inspirations into poetry. She wrote poems, short stories and epics. On her second trip to Rome in the spring of 1899, she was able to present her work "Roma aeterna" to Pope Leo XIII in a private audience. After the death of her foster mother in 1894, she worked in the charitable field in a leading position at the welfare organization. In December 1917, she suffered a stroke that confined her to bed. She did not survive another stroke. Jüngst died in Münster on June 8, 1918.

== Connection to Werne ==
Antonie Jüngst is the only honorary citizen in the town of Werne. A memorial plaque was placed on the house where she was born in Steinstraße. A street in Werne was named Jüngststraße in her honor. A picture of the writer hangs in the conference room of the Old Town Hall. There is also a display case dedicated to her in the Karl-Pollender-Stadtmuseum.

In a one-and-a-half-hour guided tour of the town on the subject of Well-known female figures in Werne – the history of women in Werne from the end of the Middle Ages to the 20th century, the Werne Tourist Office and the Museum Association bring the life and times of Antonie Jüngst back to life alongside Annette von Droste-Hülshoff, who was about a generation older.

On the 100th anniversary of her death in 2018, the town museum and Werne Marketing are dedicating an online project to the life and work of the writer, who has gone down in the history of the town of Werne as an honorary citizen.

== Works ==
- Conradin, der Staufe, episches Gedicht in 20 Gesängen. Paderborn: Schöningh, 1883. 353 p.
- Der Tod Baldurs, epic poem. Münster, Schöningh, 1886.
- Unter'm Krummstab, a song from ancient times. Paderborn, Schöningh, 1889.
- Gesucht und Gefunden. Diary pages of an old lady. Paderborn, Schöningh, 1890.
- Wider Willen. Cologne, Bachem, 1892.
- Our Father. Paderborn, Schöningh, 1892.
- Strandgut des Lebens, gesammelte Novellen. Paderborn: Schöningh, 1898.
- Roma Aeterna. Mood pictures in poetry and prose from the eternal city. Münster, Schöningh, 1900. (Digitalisat)
- Des Sturmes Lied, poem.
- Wilhelm Achtermann. A Westphalian sculptor. Limburger Vereinsdruckerei, Limburg 1904. (Digitalisat)
- Unsere Lieben Frau von Vinnenberg, Münster 1906 (self-published by the monastery with the imprimatur of Felix von Hartmann as Vic. Genlis)
- Annette von Droste-Hülshoff – a Westphalian poetess. Sketch. (Sine loco et anno) 16 p.
- Libretto for the oratorio Quo vadis by Feliks Nowowiejski, premiere 1909 in Amsterdam
- Maria von Magdala. Poetry in pictures. Schöningh, Münster 1909 (Digitalisat)
- Der Glocken Romfahrt. A circle of pictures. Schöningh, Münster 1911. (Digitalisat)
