= Diocese of Haarlem–Amsterdam =

Roman Catholic diocese in the Netherlands

Coordinates: 52.3765°N 4.6221°E

Diocese of Haarlem–Amsterdam Dioecesis Harlemensis-Amstelodamensis Bisdom Haarlem–Amsterdam

Catholic
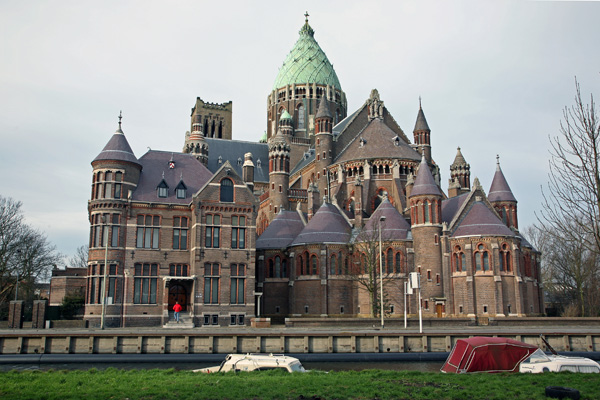
- Cathedral of Saint Bavo in Haarlem

- Coat of arms

Location
- Country: Netherlands
- Territory: North Holland, Southern Flevoland
- Metropolitan: Utrecht
- Deaneries: 10

Statistics
- Area: 2,912 km^{2} (1,124 sq mi)
- Population: Total; Catholics: (as of 2021); 3,117,170; 455,320 (14.6%)
- Parishes: 130

Information
- Denomination: Catholic
- Sui iuris church: Latin Church
- Rite: Roman Rite
- Established: 12 May 1559
- Cathedral: Cathedral of Saint Bavo
- Co-cathedral: Basilica of Saint Nicholas, Amsterdam
- Patron saint: Saints Nicholas, Bavo, Willibrord
- Secular priests: 162

Current leadership
- Pope: Leo XIV
- Bishop: Johannes Hendriks
- Metropolitan Archbishop: Willem Jacobus Eijk
- Bishops emeritus: Johannes Gerardus Maria van Burgsteden, SSS Auxiliary Bishop Emeritus (2000–2011)

Map
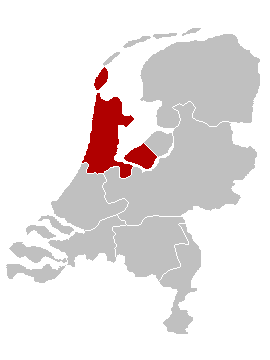
- Location of the diocese in the Netherlands

Website
- bisdomhaarlem-amsterdam.nl

The Diocese of Haarlem–Amsterdam (Dutch: Bisdom Haarlem–Amsterdam, Latin: Dioecesis Harlemensis–Amstelodamensis) is a Latin diocese of the Catholic Church in the Netherlands. As one of the seven suffragans in the ecclesiastical province of the metropolitan archbishop of Utrecht, the diocesan territory comprises the north west of the Netherlands, including the cities of Haarlem (capital of North Holland) and Amsterdam (in the same province and Dutch nominal national capital).

Johannes Hendriks has been the bishop of the Diocese of Haarlem–Amsterdam since 2020.

== History ==
The diocese was founded on 12 May 1559, on territory (central and North Holland) canonically split off from the Diocese of Utrecht, which was simultaneously promoted to archbishopric and became its metropolitan. In 1592 (during the Eighty Years War, during which the Spanish crown lost Holland) it was suppressed, and its territory was immediately included in the new Dutch Mission sui iuris 'Batavia', soon promoted an apostolic vicariate.

In 1833, the diocese was restored as (pre-diocesan) Apostolic Administration of Haarlem, which was on 4 March 1853 promoted as Diocese of Haarlem (in 1827 the Concordat established the foundation of a Diocese of Amsterdam but no bishop was nominated).

On 16 July 1955, it lost territories, to the existing Diocese of Breda, and to establish the Diocese of Groningen and Diocese of Rotterdam.

On 7 October 2008, it was renamed as Diocese of Haarlem–Amsterdam.

== Special churches ==
The cathedral episcopal see of the Diocese of Haarlem–Amsterdam is the Cathedral of Saint Bavo, a minor basilica in Haarlem, which city also has two former cathedrals: Saint Joseph Church and Saint Bavo Church (now a Protestant church). Other minor basilicas in the diocese are Basilica of Saint John the Baptist in Laren and Basilica of Saint Nicholas in Amsterdam, both in the province of North Holland.

== Statistics ==
In 2013, the diocese pastorally served 462,000 Catholics (15.8% of 2,915,000 total) on 2,912 km² in 145 parishes, with 194 priests (161 diocesan, 33 religious), 54 deacons, 557 lay religious (81 brothers, 476 sisters).

== Ordinaries ==
- Nicolaas van Nieuwland (1561–1569)
- Godfried van Mierlo, Dominican Order (O.P.) (1570–1587)
- Diocese suppressed
- Franciscus Josefus van Vree (1853–1861)
- Gerardus Petrus Wilmer (1861–1877)
- Pieter Matthijs Snickers (1877–1883)
- Caspar Josefus Martinus Bottemanne (1883–1903)
- Augustinus Josefus Callier (1903–1928)
- Johannes Dominicus Josephus Aengenent (1928–1935)
- Johannes Petrus Huibers (1935–1960)
- Joannes Antonius Eduardus van Dodewaard (1960–1966)
- Theodorus Henricus Johannes Zwartkruis (1966–1983)
- Hendrik Joseph Alois Bomers (1983–1998)
- Jozef Marianus Punt (2001–2020)
- Johannes Hendriks (2020–present)

== See also ==
- Catholic Church in the Netherlands
