= Rhenoy =

- Village
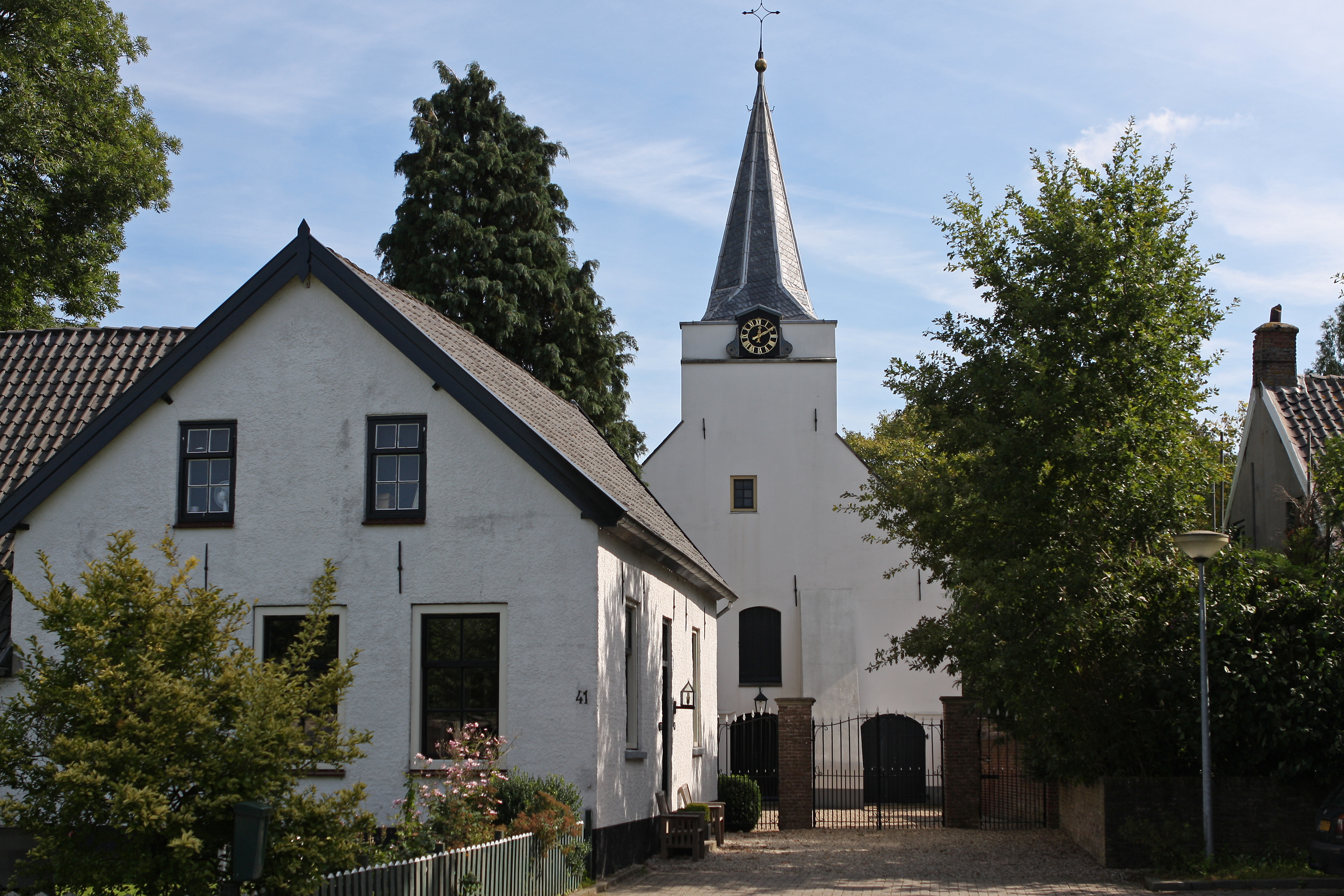
- Church of Rhenoy

- Location in the Netherlands Rhenoy (Netherlands)
- Coordinates: 51.88445°N 5.15442°E
- Country: Netherlands
- Province: Gelderland
- Municipality: West Betuwe

Area
  - Total: 6.14 km^{2} (2.37 sq mi)
- Elevation: 4 m (13 ft)

Population (2021)
  - Total: 910
  - Density: 150/km^{2} (380/sq mi)
- Time zone: UTC+1 (CET)
  - Summer (DST): UTC+2 (CEST)
- Postal code: 4152
- Dialing code: 0345

Rhenoy is a village in the Dutch province of Gelderland. It is a part of the municipality of West Betuwe, and is situated about 13 km east of Gorinchem, between Geldermalsen and Leerdam.

== History ==
It was first mentioned in 1265 as tot Rynoey, and means "land neat a stream". It is not related to the Rhine, also because it is located on the Linge. The Dutch Reformed church dates from 1836, but has 14th and 15th century elements. In 1840, it was home to 319 people.

== Gallery ==
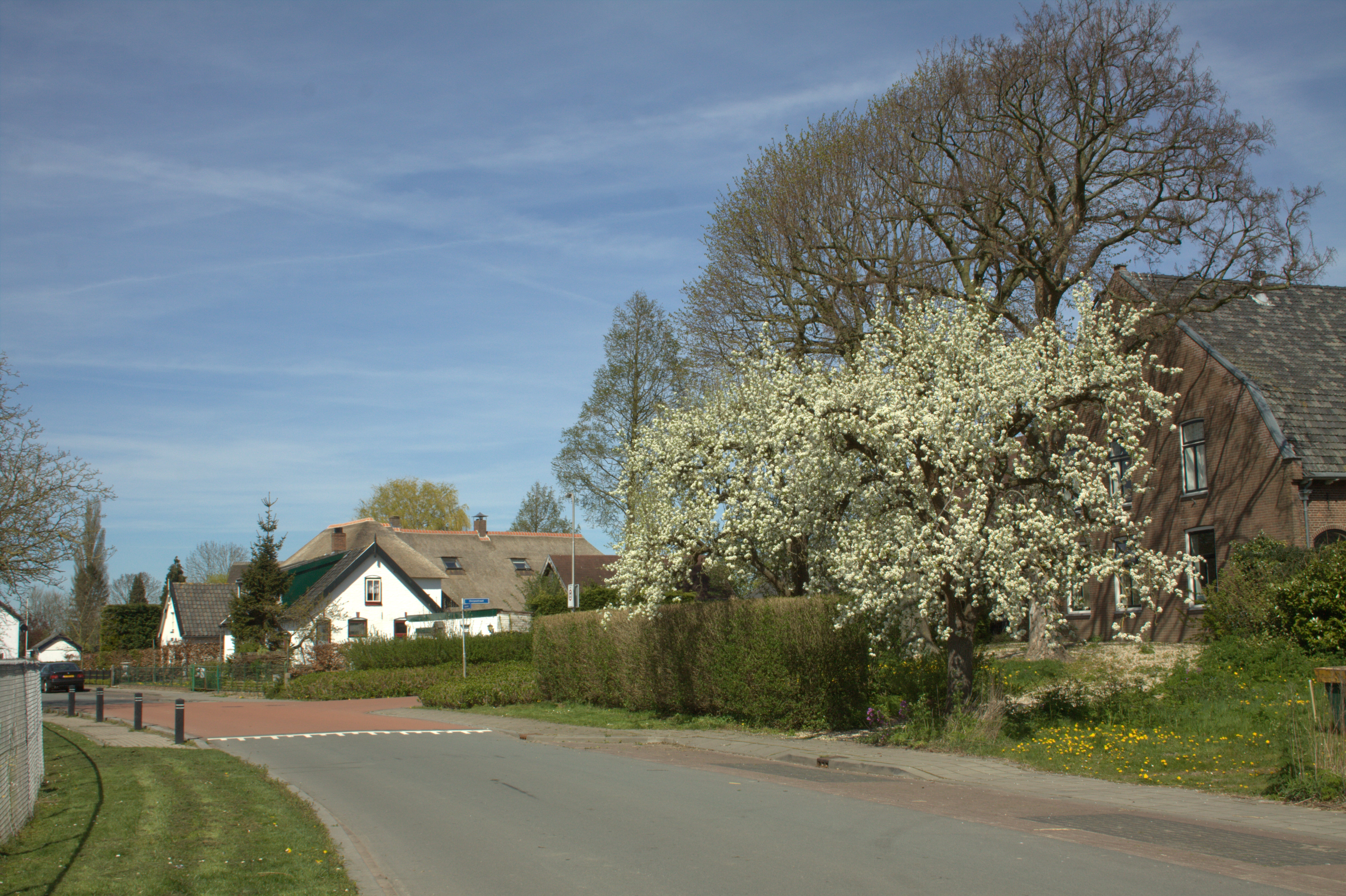
Street in Rhenoy

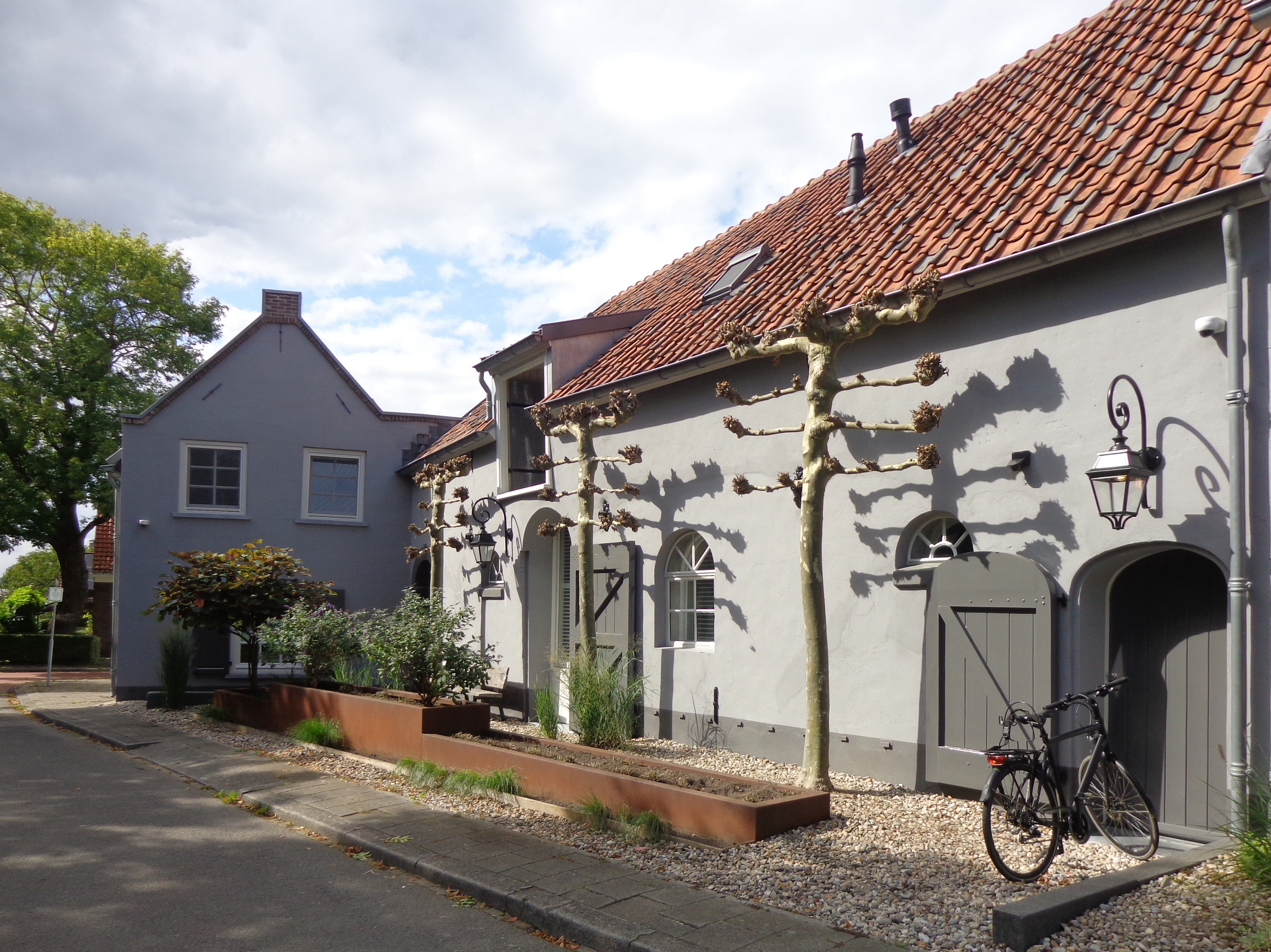
House in Rhenoy

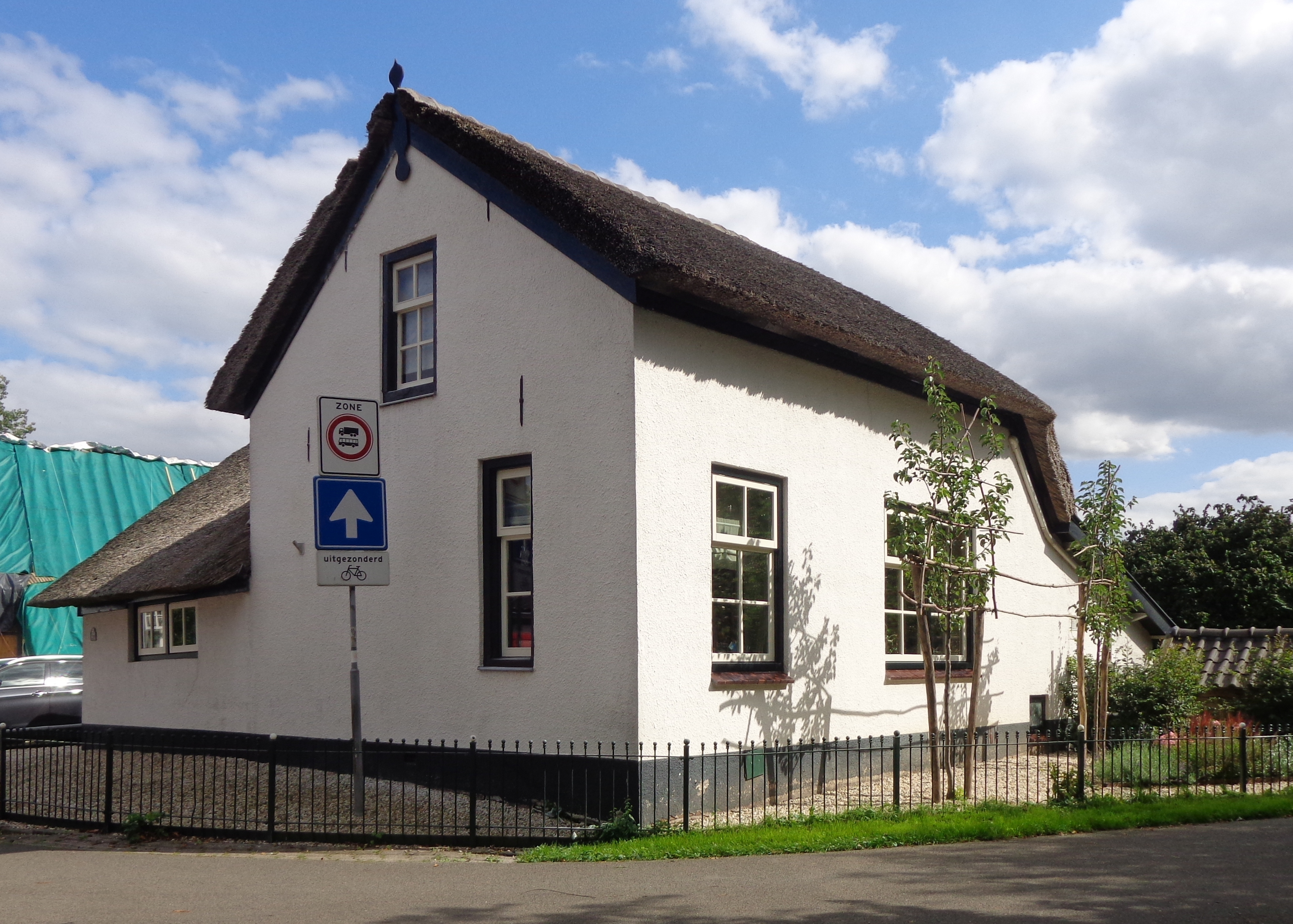
Cornerhouse

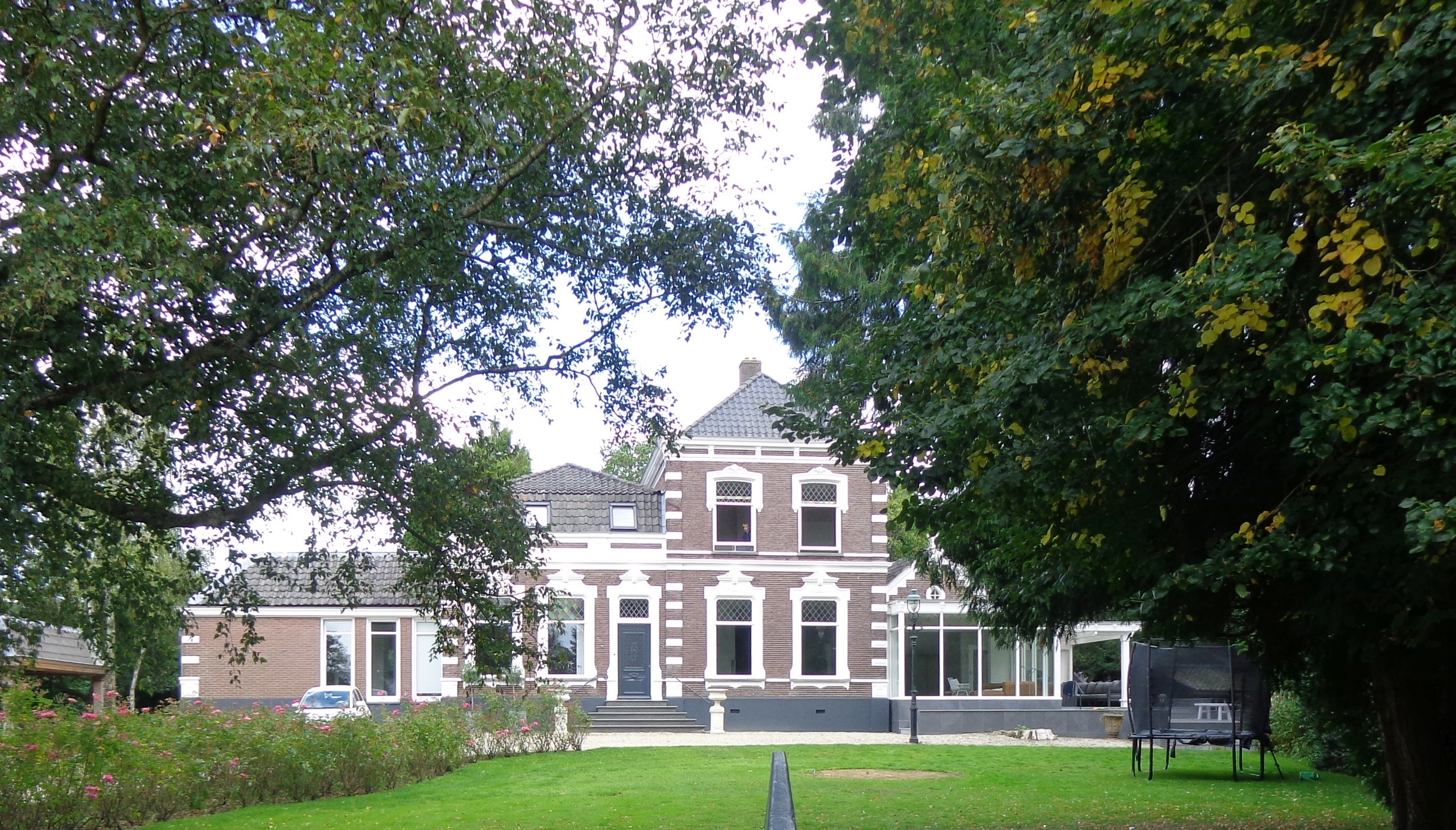
Villa in Rhenoy
