= Jos Punt =

Roman Catholic bishop of Haarlem-Amsterdam from 2001 to 2020

His Excellency Jozef Marianus Punt
- Bishop Emertius of Haarlem-Amsterdam; Apostolic Administrator Emeritus of the Military Ordinariate of the Netherlands
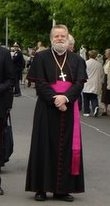
- Bishop Punt in 2008
- Diocese: Haarlem-Amsterdam
- See: Cathedral of Saint Bavo
- Appointed: 21 July 2001
- Term ended: 1 June 2020
- Predecessor: Hendrik Joseph Alois Bomers
- Successor: Johannes Willibrordus Maria Hendriks

Orders
- Ordination: 1979 by Joannes Gijsen
- Consecration: 1995 by Henny Bomers
- Rank: Bishop

Personal details
- Born: Joseph Marianus Punt; 10 January 1946 (age 80) Alkmaar, Netherlands
- Denomination: Roman Catholic
- Motto: Sub tuum praesidium
- Coat of arms: Jozef Marianus Punt's coat of arms

Ordination history
History
Priestly ordination
- Ordained by: Joannes Gijsen
- Date: 9 June 1979
Episcopal consecration
- Consecrated by: Hendrik Joseph Alois Bomers
- Date: 1 July 1995
Episcopal succession
Bishops consecrated by Jos Punt as principal consecrator
- Johannes Gerardus Maria van Burgsteden: 9 September 2000
- Johannes Willibrordus Maria Hendriks: 10 December 2011

Jozef Marianus "Jos" Punt (born 10 January 1946) was the Roman Catholic bishop of Haarlem-Amsterdam in the Netherlands from 2001 to 2020.

== Early life ==
Joseph Marianus Punt was born on 10 January 1946 in Alkmaar, North Holland, Netherlands. In his years as a student of economics in Amsterdam Punt distanced himself from the Catholic religion of his youth and was more involved in esotericism, gnosticism and Rosicrucianism. Upon discovering the Bible however, he began considering a career in the priesthood. He went to the south of the country where at the time there existed the only Catholic Dutch Seminary. In 1973 he obtained a doctoral degree in economics from the University of Amsterdam.

== Roman Catholic Church ==
Styles of Joseph Marianus Punt
- Reference style: The Reverend
- Spoken style: Your Excellency
- Religious style: Bishop

In 1979 he became a priest, ordained by Bishop of Roermond Joannes Gijsen. In the Seminary he taught the Social Teachings of the Church, and he got also his PhD in that field from Augsburg University in Germany.

Pope John Paul II appointed him Auxiliary Bishop of Haarlem 1995; he was ordained by the local ordinary, bishop Henny Bomers. Punt was also appointed as apostolic administrator for the Military Ordinariate.

In 1998 Bomers died suddenly after suffering a heart attack. Punt was appointed Apostolic Administrator. On 21 July 2001 he was appointed bishop of Haarlem. He was assisted by auxiliary bishop Johannes Gerardus Maria Hendriks, who was appointed coadjutor bishop in December 2018 and succeeded him as bishop of Haarlem-Amsterdam on 1 June 2020.

Punt was the 13th bishop of the diocese, which was established in 1559. Due to the Protestant Reformation there was no bishop in Haarlem, or the Netherlands, for 300 years, until 1853.

Pope Francis accepted his resignation on 1 June 2020. He had previously announced he hoped to retire before the usual age of 75 for health reasons.

== Religious views ==
Bishop Punt has indicated a devotion to the Blessed Virgin Mary because he took as his motto Sub tuum praesidium, the opening phrase of a Marian hymn. He supports a proposal of the Lourdes Foundation of Amstel to construct a pilgrimage church modeled on Hagia Sophia to be built in honor of Maria Vrouwe van Alle Volkeren.

Catholic Church titles
Preceded by Rudolf Müller	— TITULAR — Bishop of Nasai; 1 April 1995–21 July 2001	Succeeded by Benedito Beni dos Santos
Preceded by Hendrik Joseph Alois Bomers	Bishop of Haarlem; 21 July 2001–7 October 2008	Diocese Name Changed
Preceded by Hendrik Joseph Alois Bomers	Bishop of Haarlem-Amsterdam; 7 October 2008- 1 June 2020	Succeeded by Johannes Willibrordus Maria Hendriks
