= Bavo of Ghent =

Roman Catholic and Eastern Orthodox saint

Saint Bavo
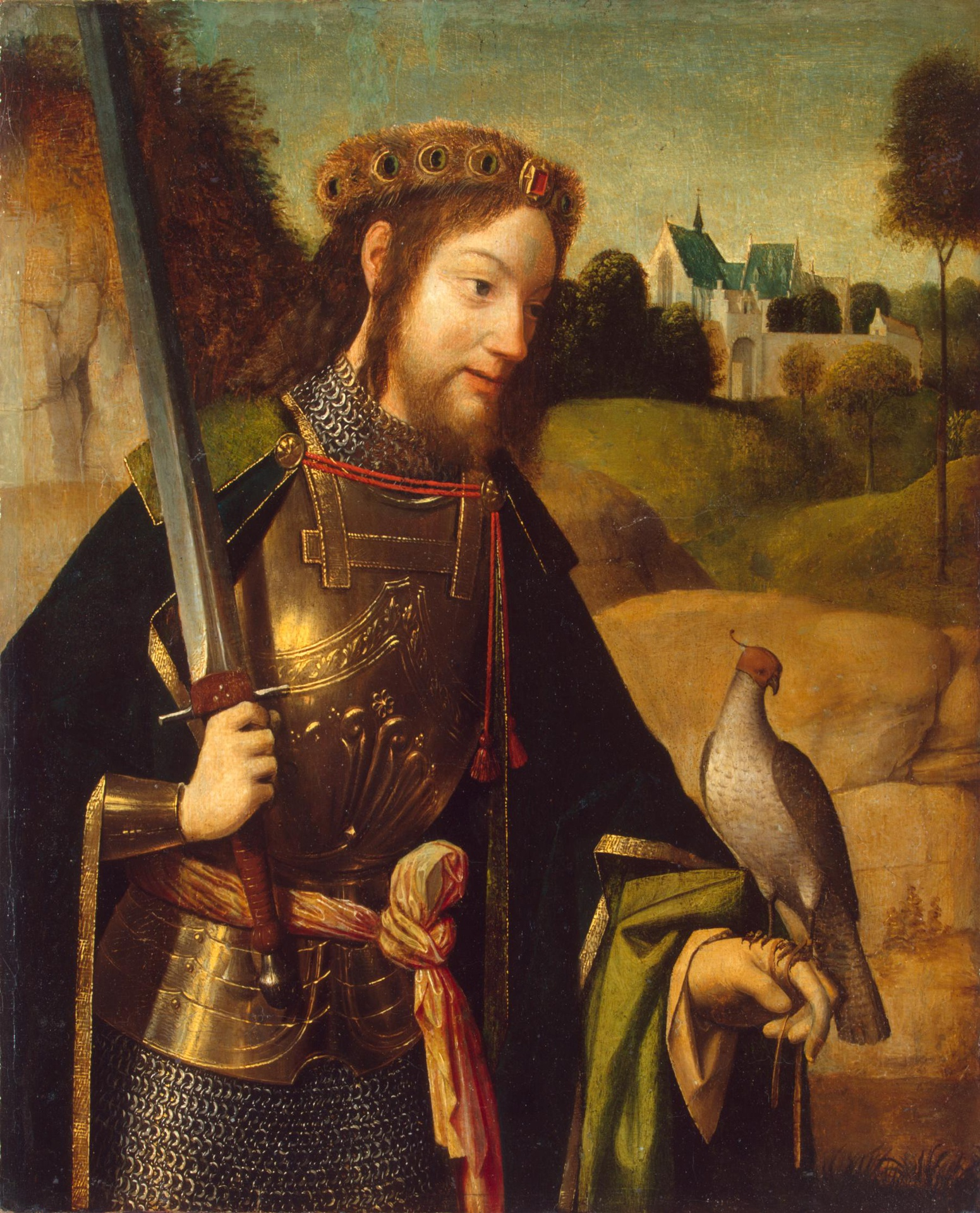
- Saint Bavo with falcon and sword, by Geertgen tot Sint Jans, late 15th century
- Born: Allowin; 622; Hesbaye, Kingdom of the Franks
- Died: 653; Ghent, Kingdom of the Franks
- Venerated in: Roman Catholic Church; Eastern Orthodox Church
- Canonized: Pre-Congregation
- Feast: October 1
- Attributes: Greaves, other military or aristocratic garb, falcon, sword
- Patronage: Ghent, Diocese of Ghent, Haarlem, Lauwe

Saint Bavo of Ghent (also known as Bavon, Allowin, Bavonius, Baaf; AD 622–659) is a Roman Catholic and Eastern Orthodox saint. He exchanged a dissolute lifestyle for that of a missionary under the guidance of Saint Amand.

== Vita ==
Bavo was born near Liège, to a Frankish noble family that gave him the name Allowin. A wild young aristocrat of the Brabant area, he contracted a beneficial marriage, and had a daughter.

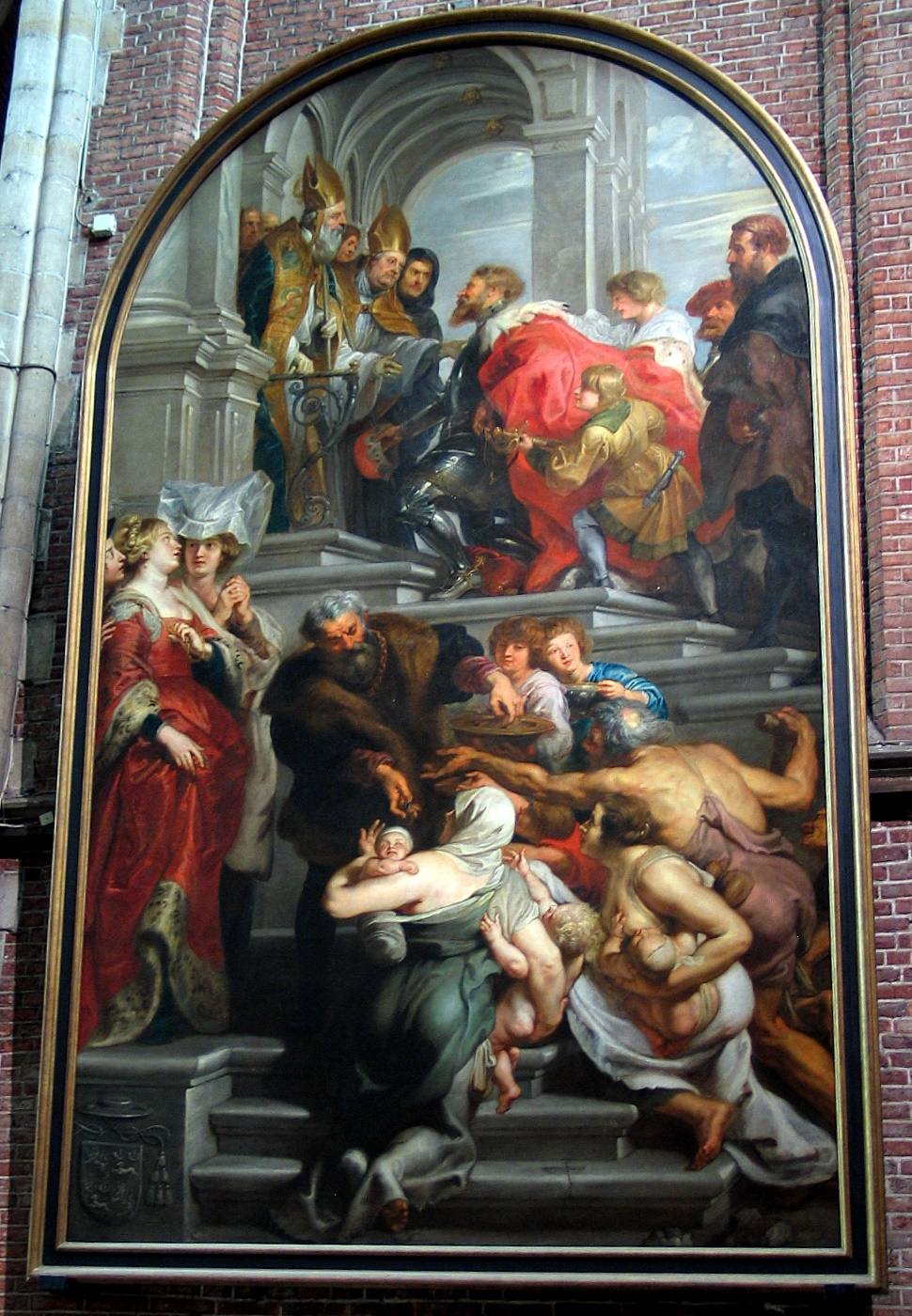
The Conversion of St Bavo, Rubens, c. 1623

As a soldier he led an undisciplined and disorderly life. Shortly after the death of his wife, Bavo decided to reform after hearing a sermon preached by Saint Amand (c. 584 – 679) on the emptiness of material things. On returning to his house he distributed his wealth to the poor, and then received the tonsure from Amand.

For some time thereafter, Bavo joined Amand in the latter's missionary travels throughout France and Flanders. On one occasion, Bavo met a man whom he had sold into slavery years before. Wishing to atone for his earlier deed, Bavo had the man lead him by a chain to the town jail. Bavo built an abbey on his grounds and became a monk. He distributed his belongings to the poor and lived as a recluse, first in a hollow tree and later in a cell in the forest by the abbey.

His relics were housed at the abbey in Ghent (in present-day Belgium).

== Veneration ==
Bavo is the patron saint of Ghent, Zellik, and Lauwe in Belgium, and Haarlem in the Netherlands. His feast in the Catholic Church and the Eastern Orthodox Church is October 1.

He is most often shown in Christian art as a knight with a sword and falcon. The most popular scene is the moment of his conversion, which has many stories attached to it. Because he is so often shown with a falcon, he came to be considered the patron saint of falconry. In medieval Ghent, taxes were paid on Bavo's feast day, and it is for this reason he is often shown holding a purse or money bag.

According to Rodulfus Glaber, the city of Bamberg is named after him, with Bamberg meaning "Mount of Bavo".

== Legacy ==
Several churches are dedicated to him, including:

- Saint Bavo Cathedral, in Ghent
- Sint-Bavokerk and Cathedral of Saint Bavo, both in Haarlem
- Sint-Bavokerk in Heemstede, Lauwe, and Zellik
- Saint Bavo Church and School, in Mishawaka, Indiana
- Sint-Bavokerk (Wilrijk) in Wilrijk

Additionally, the football club VVSB is named after him.

His picture is also part of the coat of arms of the Antwerp suburb Wilrijk. Rembrandt painted a Saint Bavo, dated between 1662 and 1665.

== Images ==
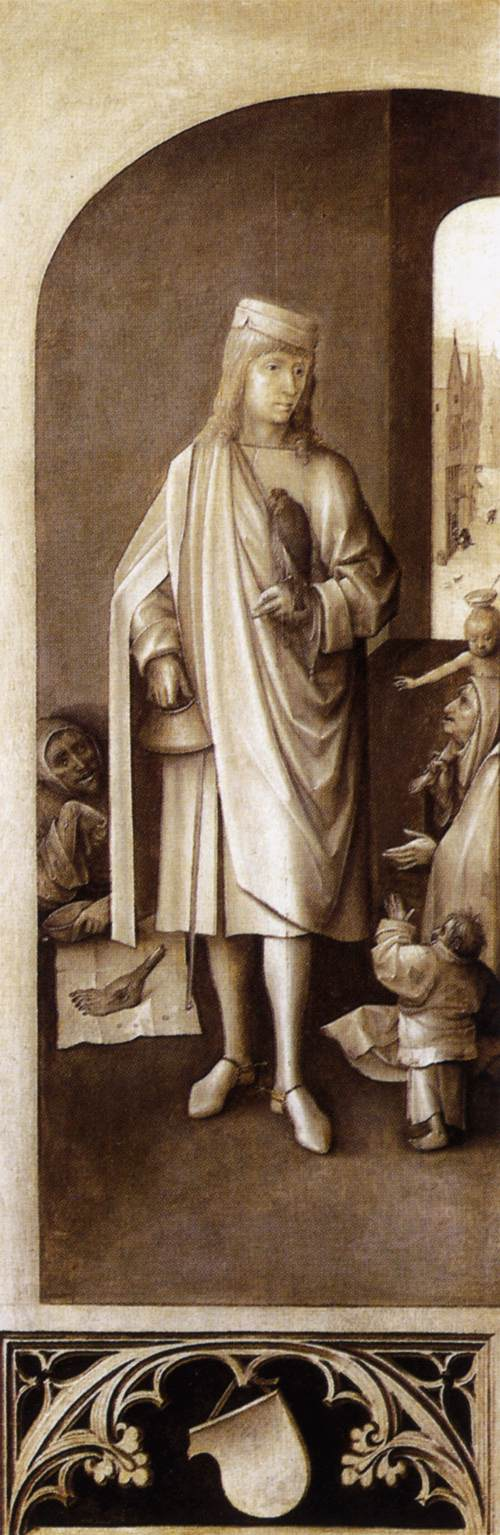
Saint Bavo by Hieronymous Bosch, with both attributes, the purse and falcon, ca.1498-1504, detail from The Last Judgment (Bosch triptych)

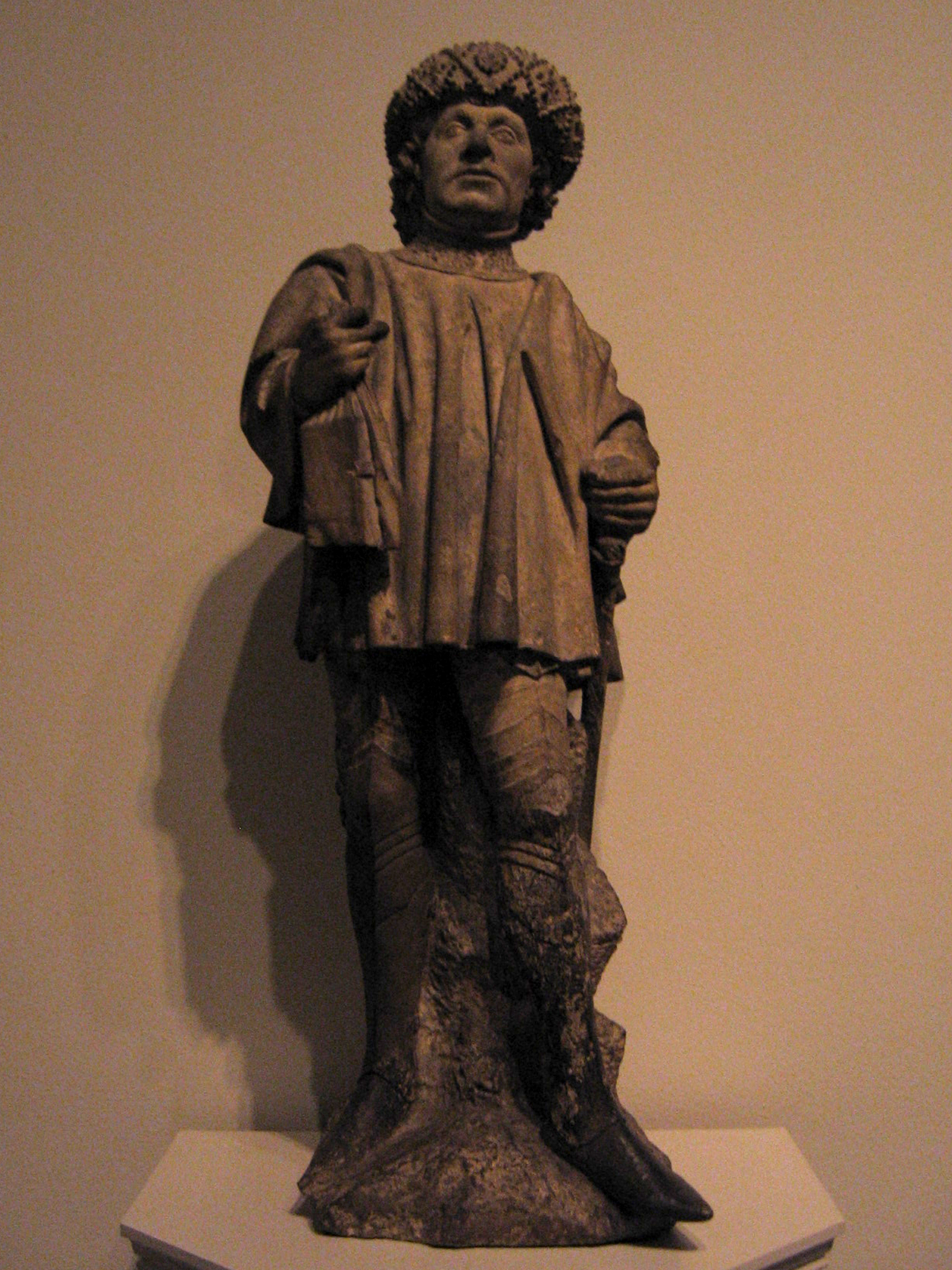
Saint Bavo, ca. 1460. North Netherlandish. Limestone with traces of polychromy. Metropolitan Museum of Art, New York City.

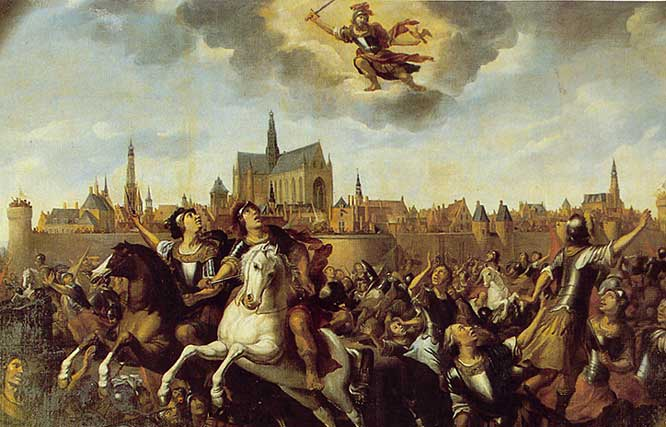
Saint Bavo saves Haarlem from the Kennemers. Dated 1673 but showing legend from 1274.
