= Johannes Hendriks =

Dutch Catholic prelate (born 1954)

The Most Reverend Johannes Hendriks
- Bishop of Haarlem-Amsterdam
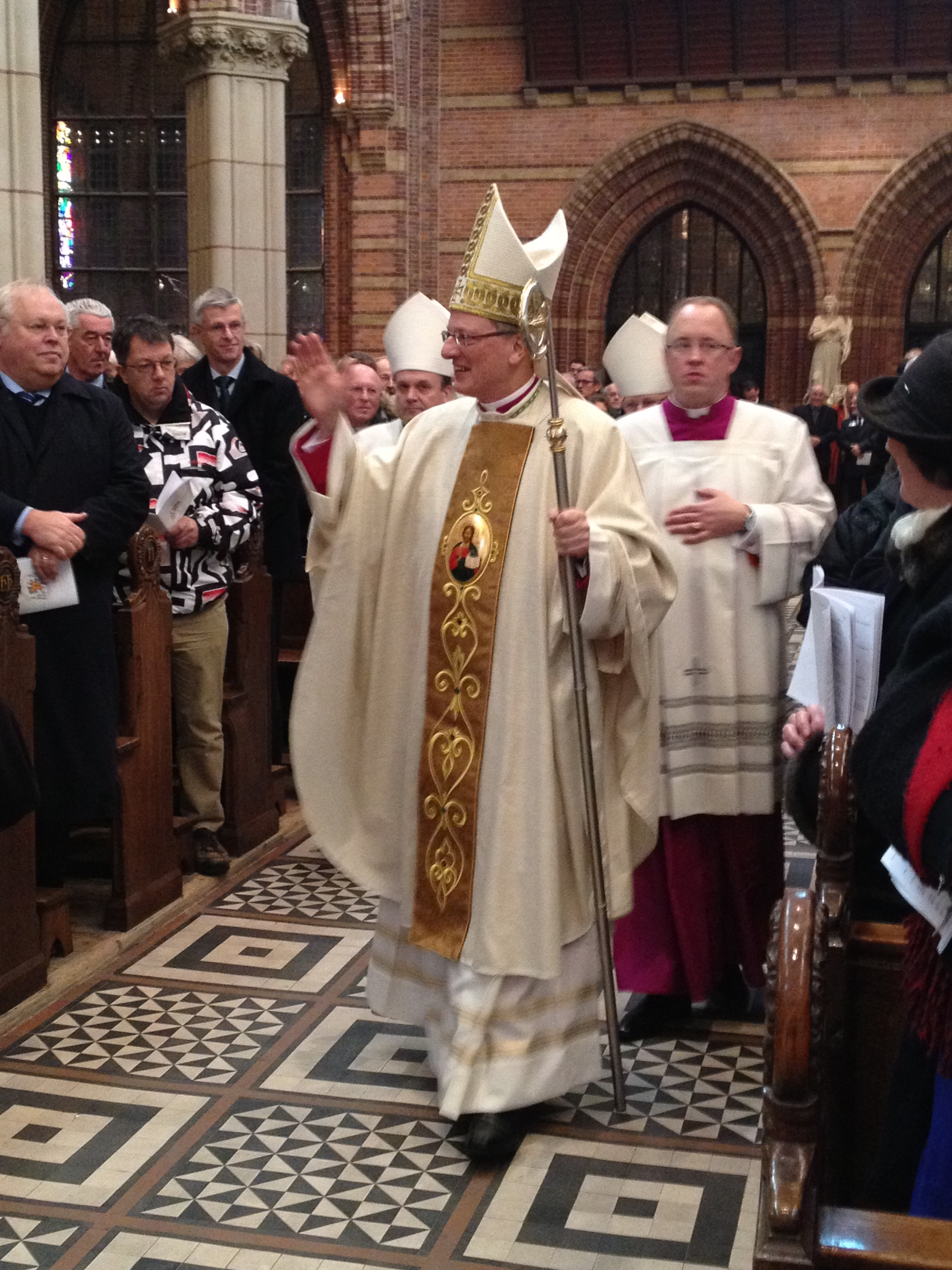
- Hendriks in 2011
- Church: Catholic Church
- Diocese: Haarlem–Amsterdam
- Installed: 1 June 2020
- Predecessor: Jozef Marianus Punt
- Previous posts: Auxiliary Bishop of Haarlem–Amsterdam & Titular Bishop of Arsacal (2011–2018); Coadjutor Bishop of Haarlem–Amsterdam (2018–2020)

Orders
- Ordination: 29 September 1979 by Adrianus Simonis
- Consecration: 10 December 2011 by Jozef Marianus Punt

Personal details
- Born: Johannes Willibrordus Maria Hendriks; 17 November 1954 (age 71) Leidschendam, Netherlands
- Motto: Quodcumque dixit vobis faciet (Latin for 'Do whatever He tells you')
- Styles
- Reference style: The Reverend
- Spoken style: Your Excellency
- Religious style: Bishop

Johannes Willibrordus Maria Hendriks is a Dutch Catholic prelate serving as Bishop of Haarlem-Amsterdam since 2020. He previously served as auxiliary bishop of the diocese from 2011 to 2018 and coadjutor bishop from 2018 to 2020.

Hendriks was ordained as a priest in 1979 and served in Den Haag and Haastrecht before being transferred to Haarlem-Amsterdam.

== Early life and education ==
Hendriks was born on November 17, 1954, in Leidschendam, in the Roman Catholic Diocese of Rotterdam. He studied philosophy and theology at the Higher Institute of Theology in Amsterdam, Netherlands and at the major seminary of the Roman Catholic Diocese of Roermond in Rolduc, Netherlands (former abbey). Later, he continued his studies at the Pontifical Gregorian University, obtaining his Doctorate in Canon Law (J.C.D.), while living at the Pontifical Dutch College.

== Career ==
Hendriks was ordained a priest on September 29, 1979, for the Diocese of Rotterdam. From 1979 to 1981, he was assistant parish priest in Den Haag, Netherlands. From 1987 to 1997, he was in charge of the parish of Haastrecht, Netherlands. In 1997, he was appointed Vice-Rector, and in 1998, Rector, of the Seminary of the Diocese of Haarlem-Amsterdam, where he also teaches Canon Law.

In 2005, he was awarded the title "Chaplain of His Holiness", the lowest grade of Monsignor. He also became the Canon of the Cathedral Chapter of Haarlem-Amsterdam and a member of the Diocesan Council of Priests. Until 2022, he was also a consultant to the Sacred Congregation for the Clergy in the Roman Curia.

He was appointed Auxiliary Bishop of Haarlem–Amsterdam and Titular Bishop of Arsacal (Algeria), and was ordained bishop on December 10, 2011. On September 30, 2017, Pope Francis appointed him a member of the Supreme Tribunal of the Apostolic Signatura. On December 22, 2018, he was appointed as Coadjutor Bishop of the same diocese, with the right of succession. On 1 June 2020, he succeeded as Bishop upon the retirement of Jozef Marianus Punt.
