= St. Joseph Kerk, Haarlem =

Church in Haarlem, Netherlands

Coordinates: 52°22′59″N 4°38′19″E

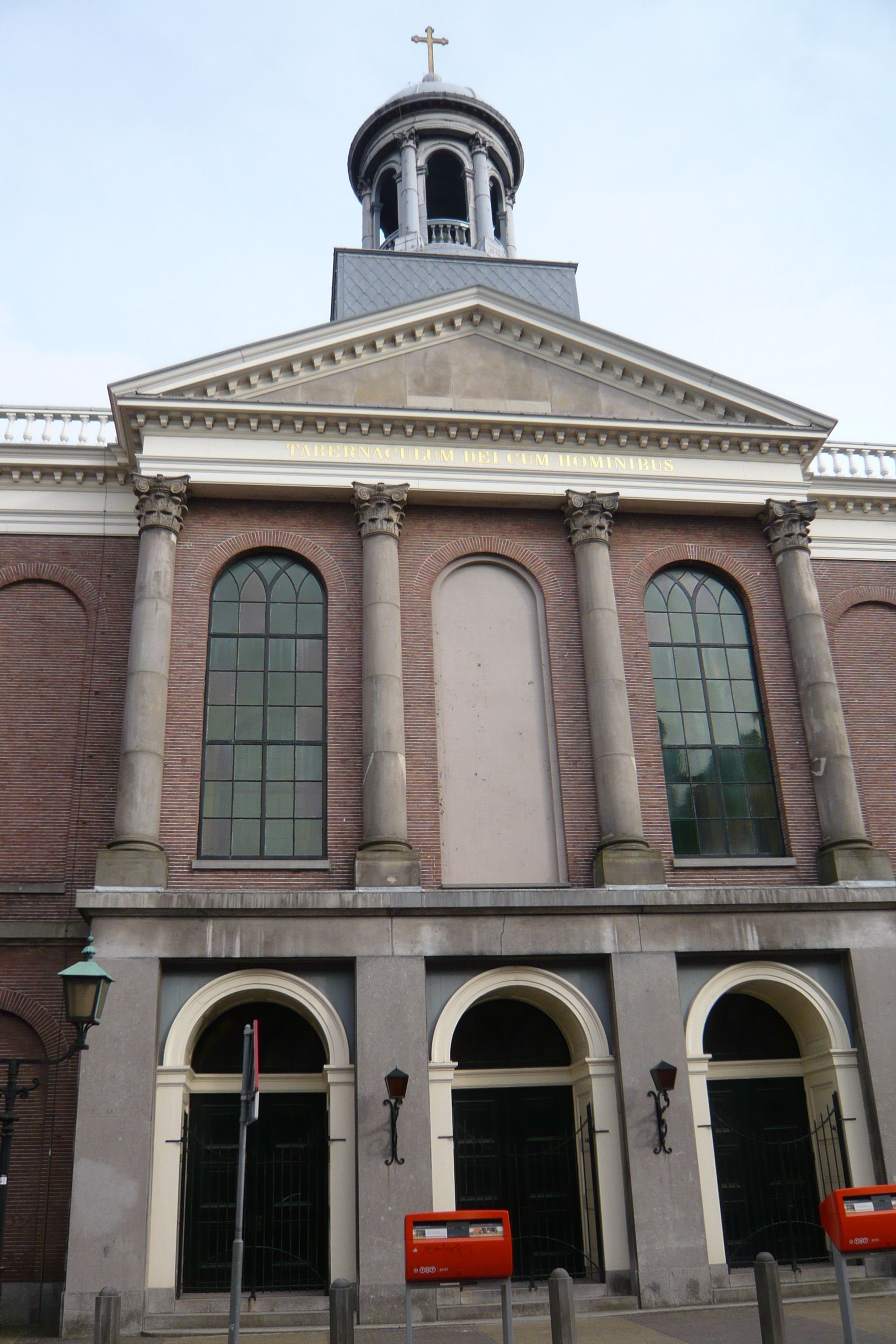
St. Joseph kerk in Haarlem.

The St. Joseph kerk is a church dating from the 19th century on the Jansstraat in Haarlem, Netherlands. It is located across from the Janskerk (Haarlem).

On 7 July 1853, Pope Pius IX elevated the St. Joseph Church to the status of cathedral of the diocese of Haarlem. In 1856, the church was enlarged in length and width, with oak canon benches in the chancel. Since 1898, the St. Joseph Church has been a regular church again. Since 2 May 1948, the cathedral of Haarlem has been the Cathedral of St. Bavo on the Leidsevaart.

== History ==
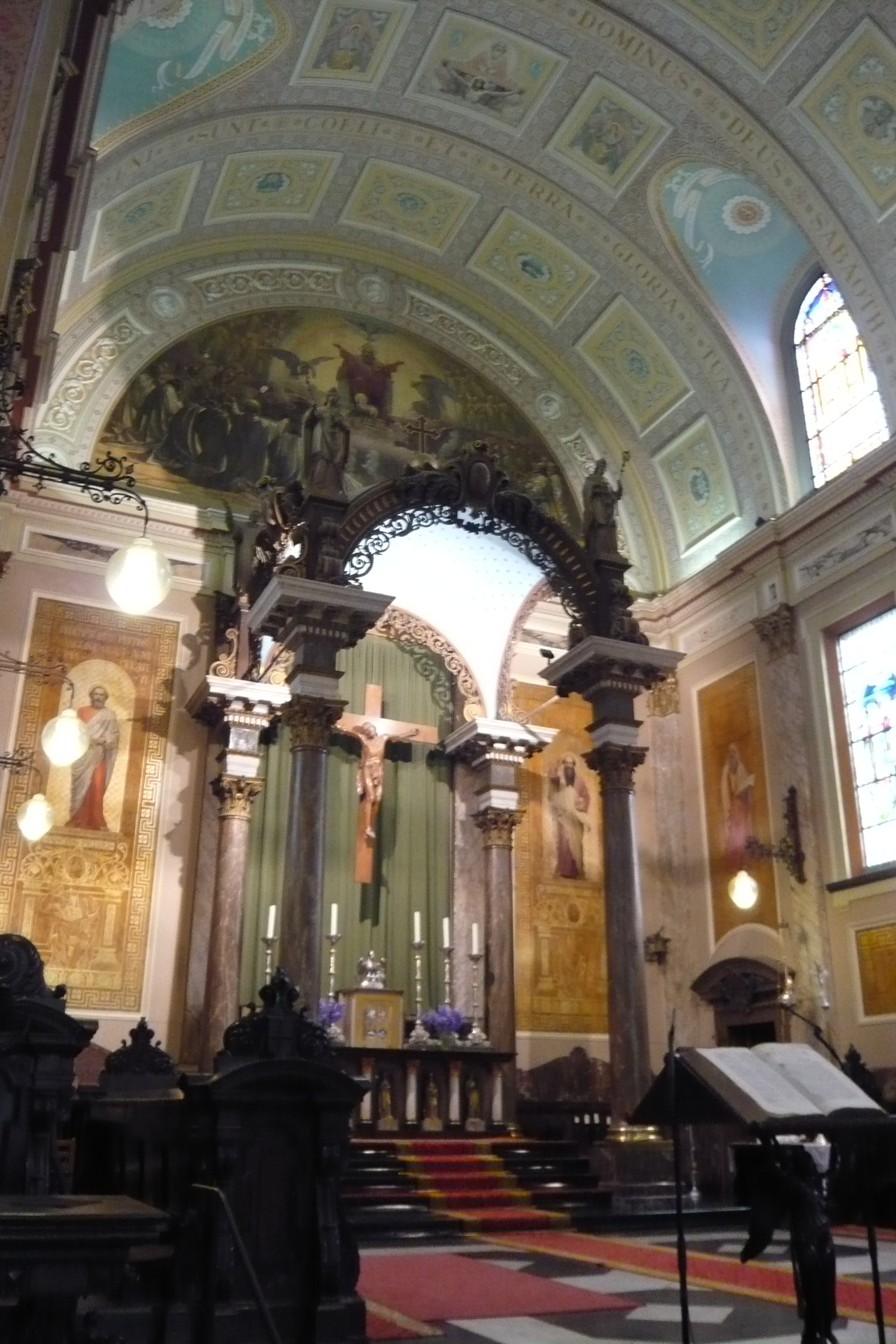
Interior with altar.

The Catholic church was built between 1841 and 1843 and was designed by H.H. Dansdorp in a neoclassical style. The organ was built in 1906 by P.J. Adema to replace an organ made in 1855 by H. Lindsen.
