= De Vishal =

Coordinates: 52°22′53″N 4°38′12″E

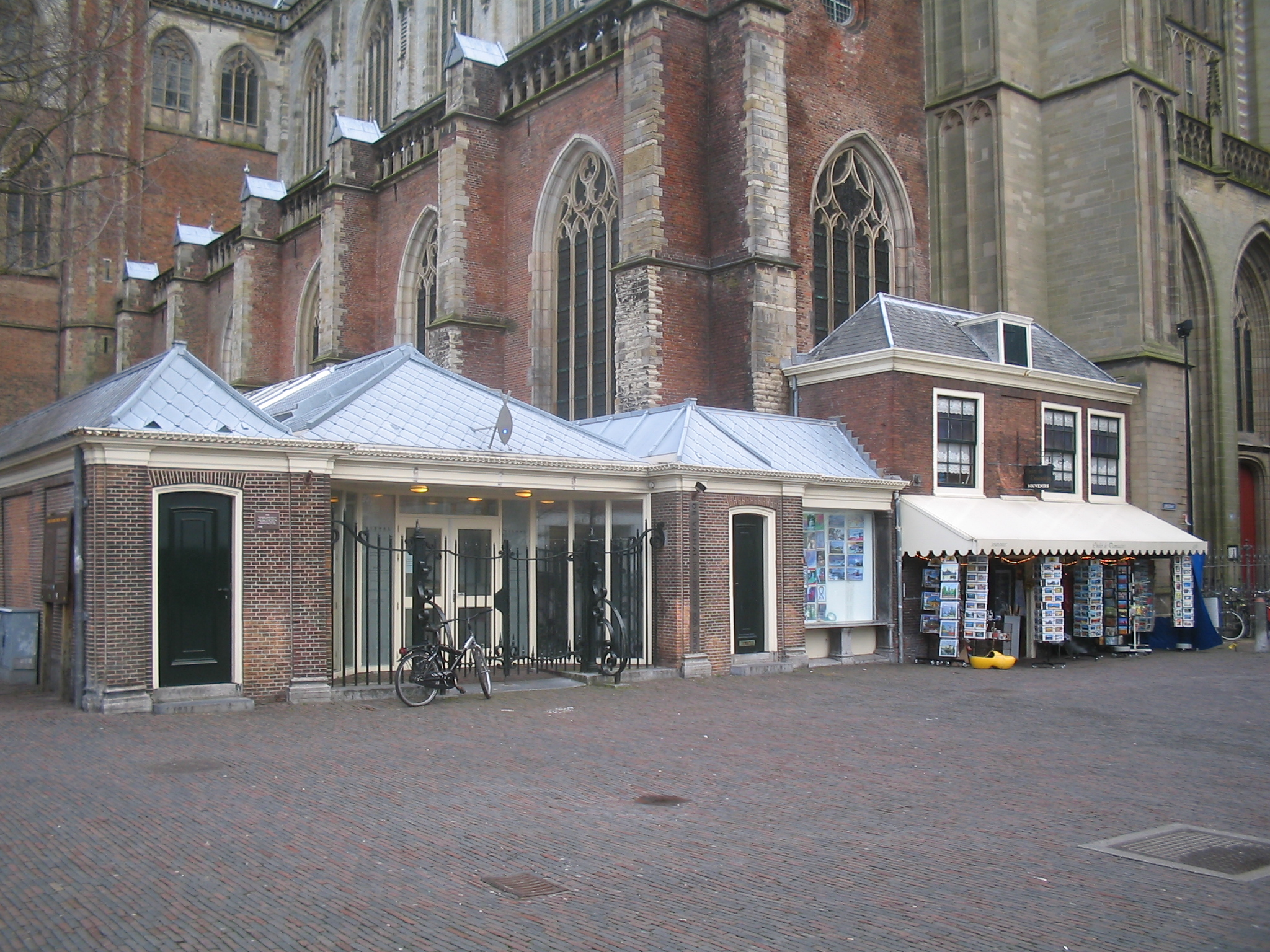
Vishal

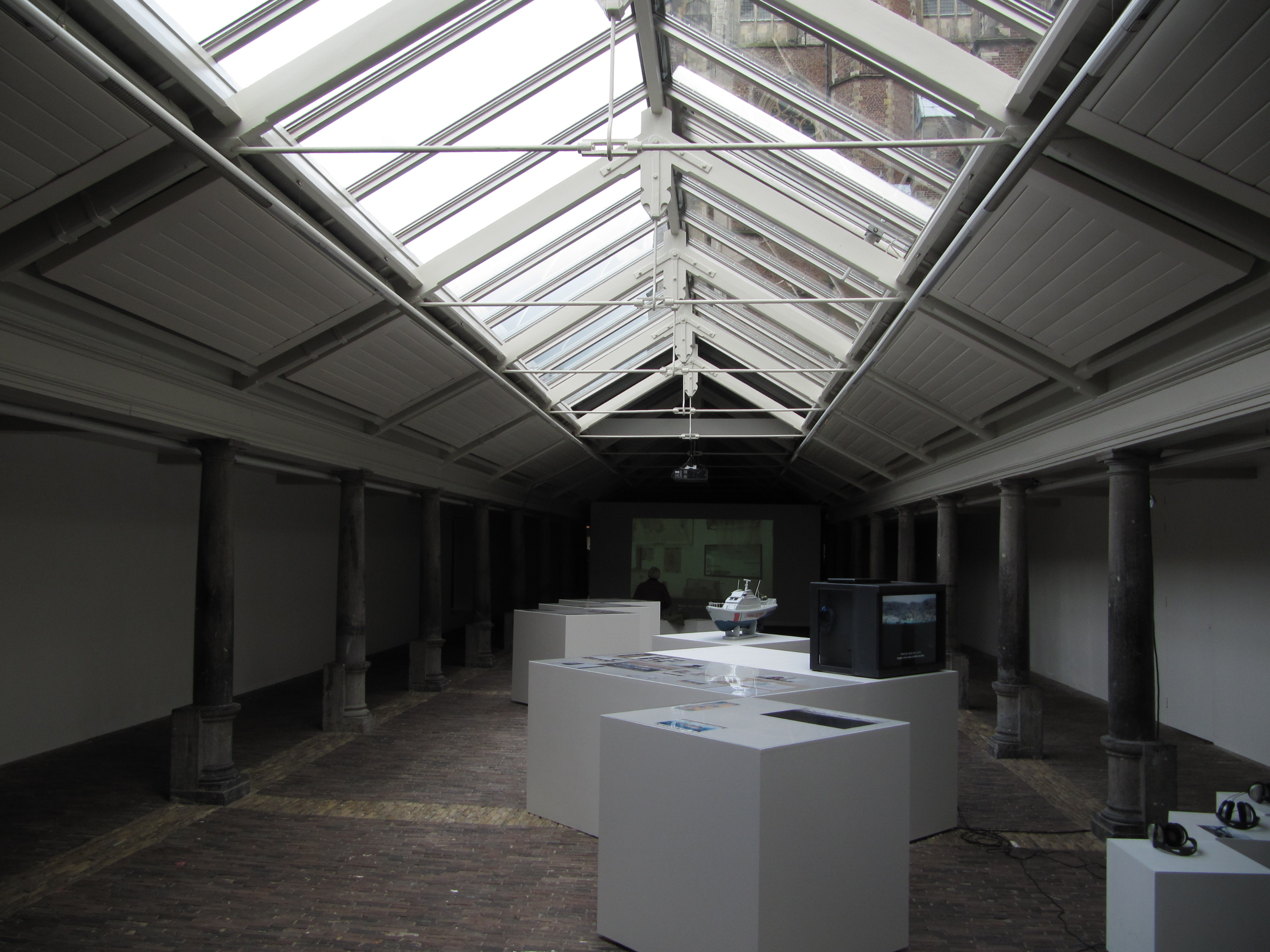
Inside

De Vishal is a historical building dating from 1769 on the Grote Markt in Haarlem, the Netherlands.

It is built up against the St. Bavochurch. As the name Vishal (fish-hall) literally indicates, it was constructed as a hall for selling fish to replace a much more extensive fish market that extended further into the town square and which dated from 1603, the same year as the Vleeshal (meat-hall) across the square. It was originally an open air market in the middle and the roof with skylight was installed in 1899. It functioned as a fish market until 1941. Today it serves as a gallery for temporary exhibitions of modern art.

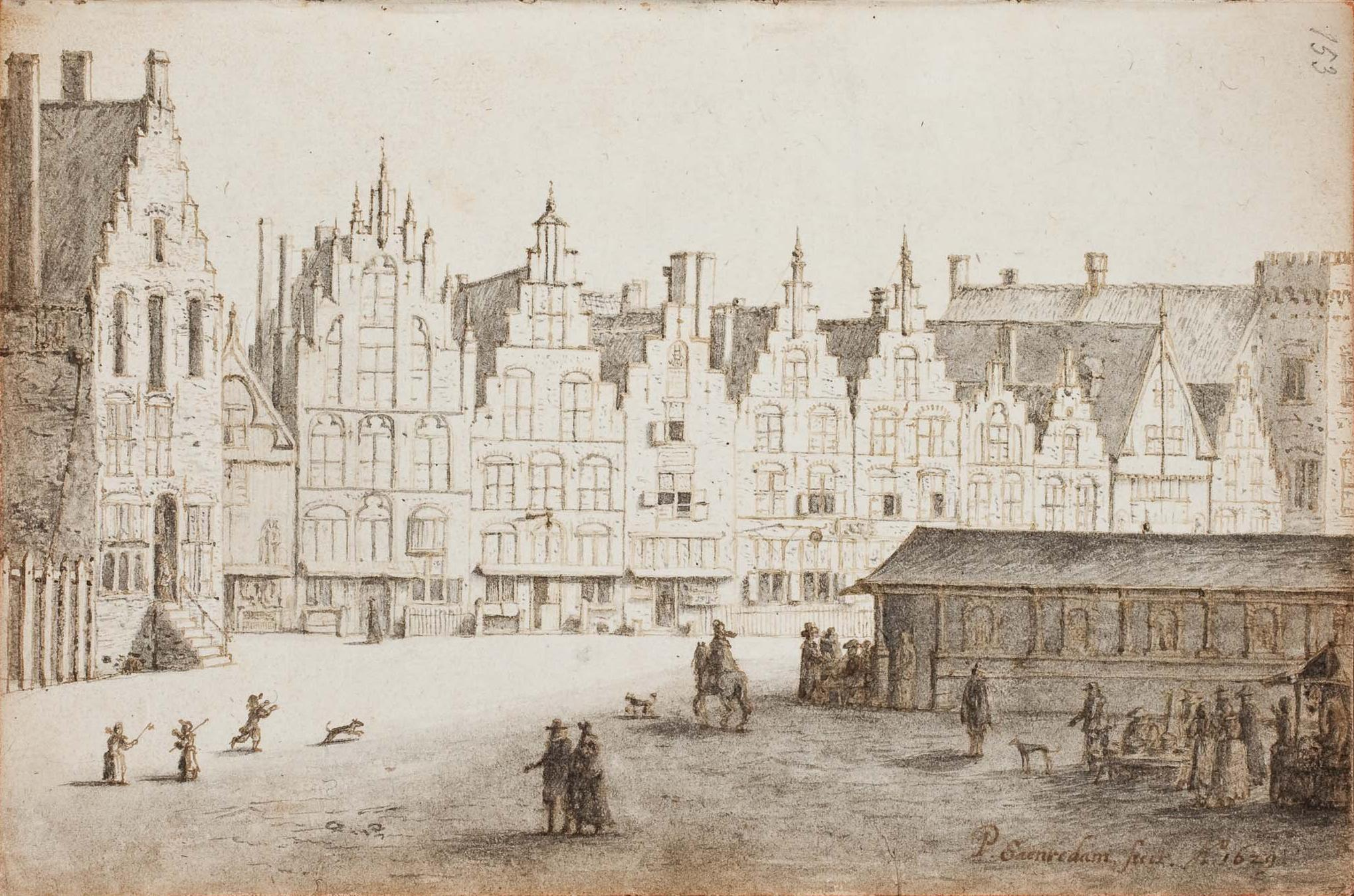
Drawing by Pieter Jansz Saenredam in 1629 of the Grote Markt with the northern edge of the old fish market extending across the market to the Hoofdwacht, Haarlem.

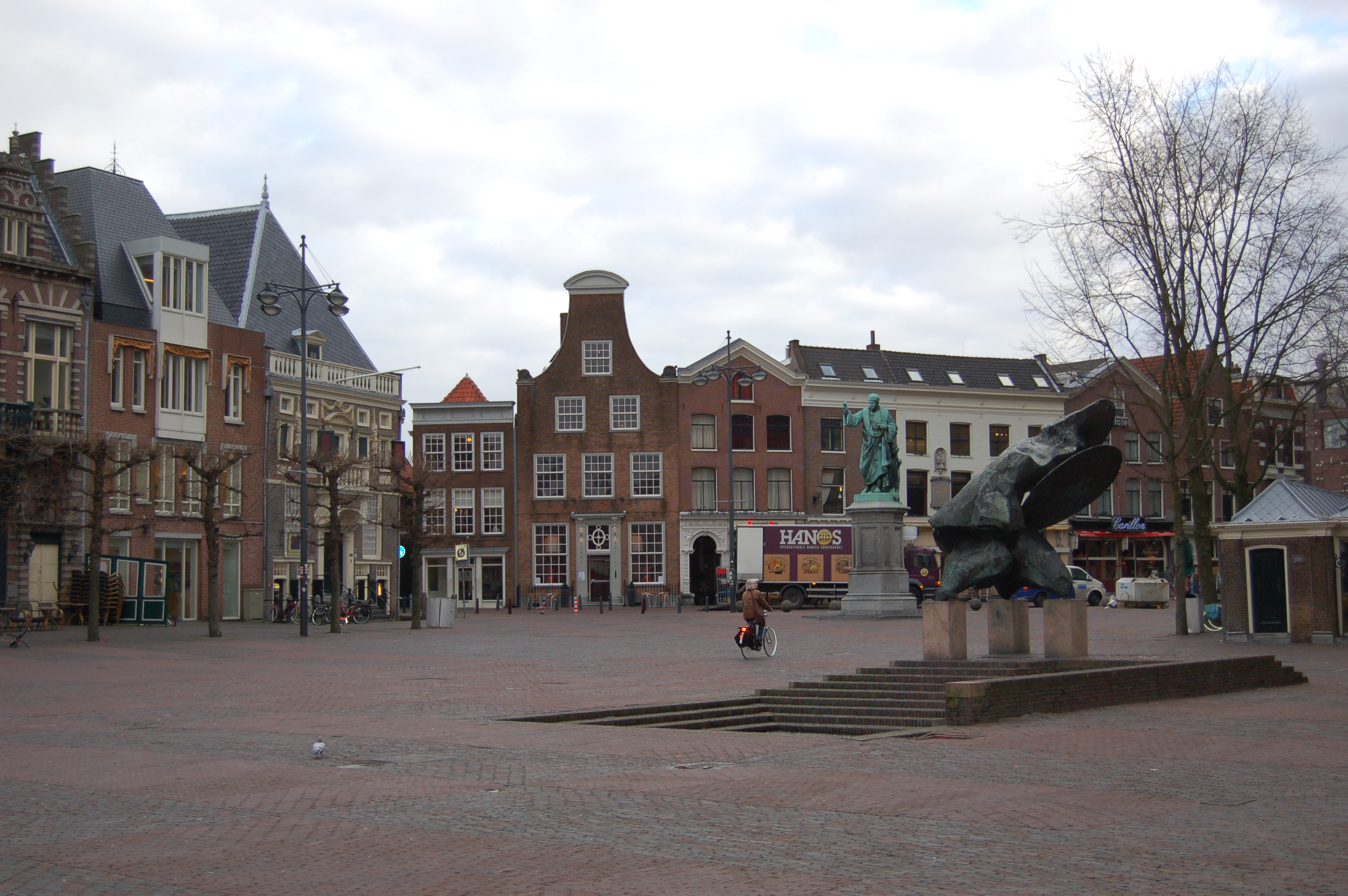
Same view today with Hoofwacht on the left and corner of the Vishal on the right.

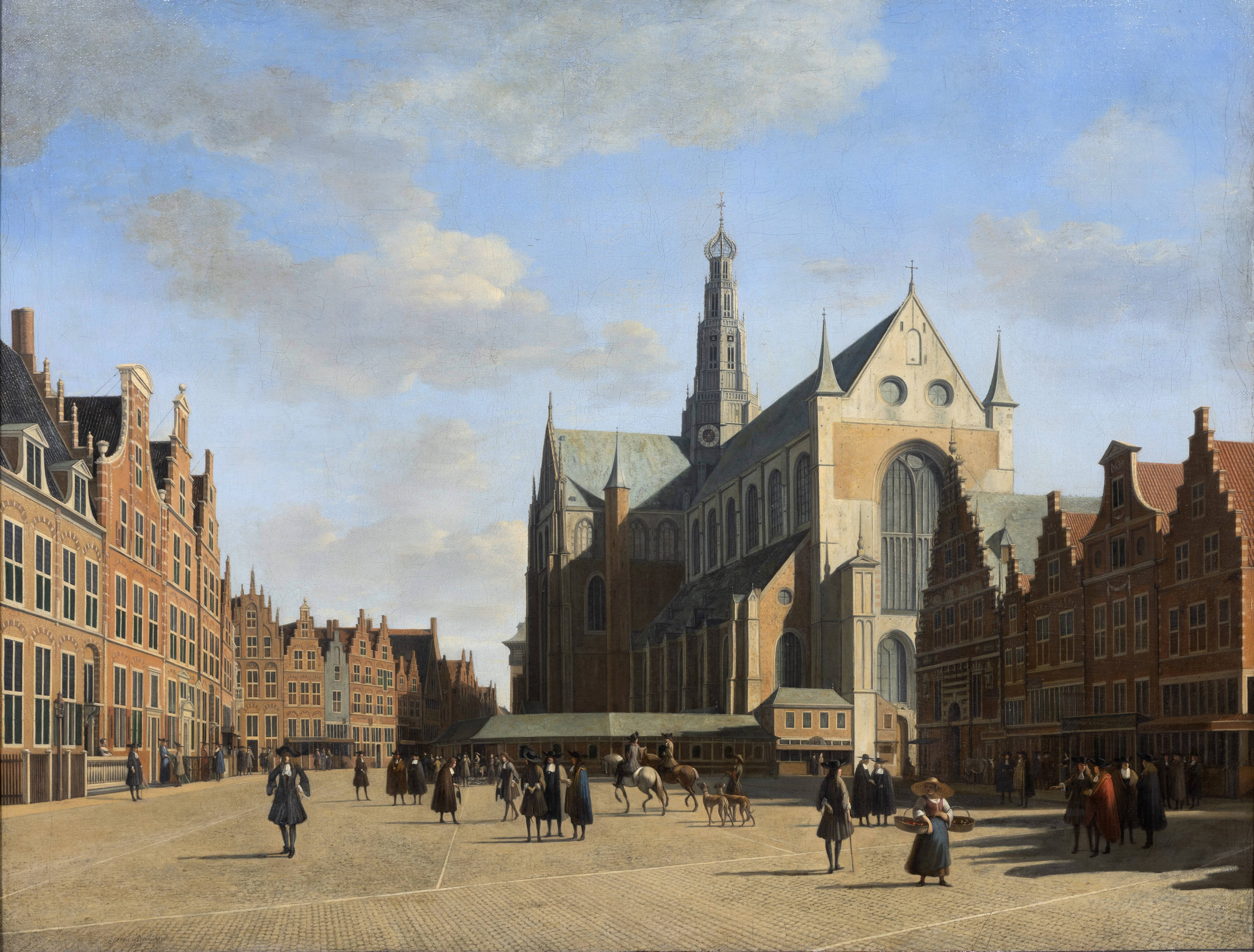
Painting by Gerrit Adriaensz Berckheyde in 1696 with the old Vishal and the church.

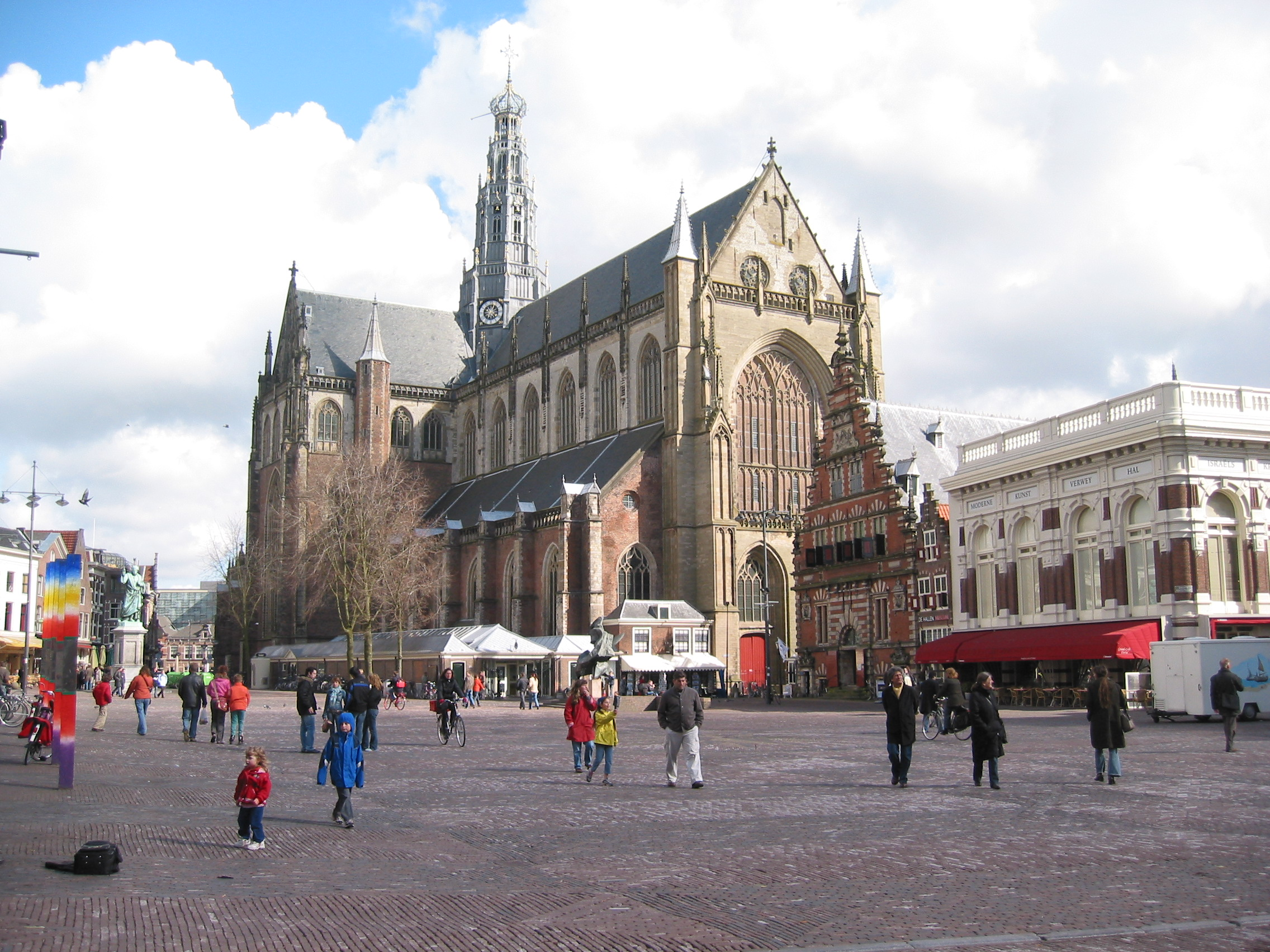
View of the Vishal and church behind it today.
