= Jan Saenredam =

Dutch artist

Jan Pieterszoon Saenredam
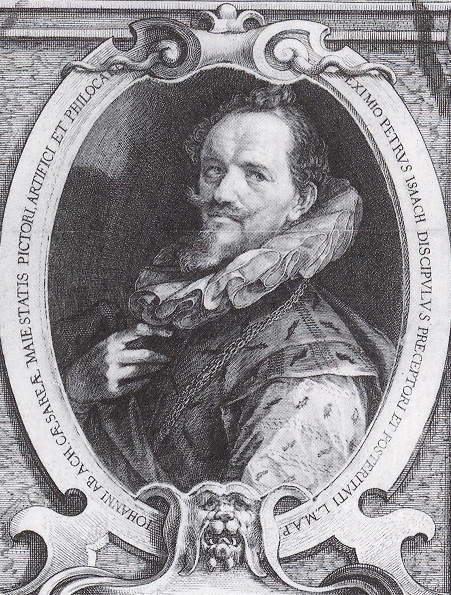
- Saenredam engraving, late 16th century
- Born: c. 1565; Zaandam, County of Holland
- Died: 6 April 1607; Assendelft, Dutch Republic
- Burial place: St. Adolphus Church, Assendelft
- Education: Hendrick Goltzius
- Occupations: Engraver; printmaker; cartographer
- Known for: Engravings of allegorical, mythological, and biblical subjects
- Movement: Northern Mannerism
- Spouse: Anna Pauwelsdochter
- Children: Pieter Jansz Saenredam

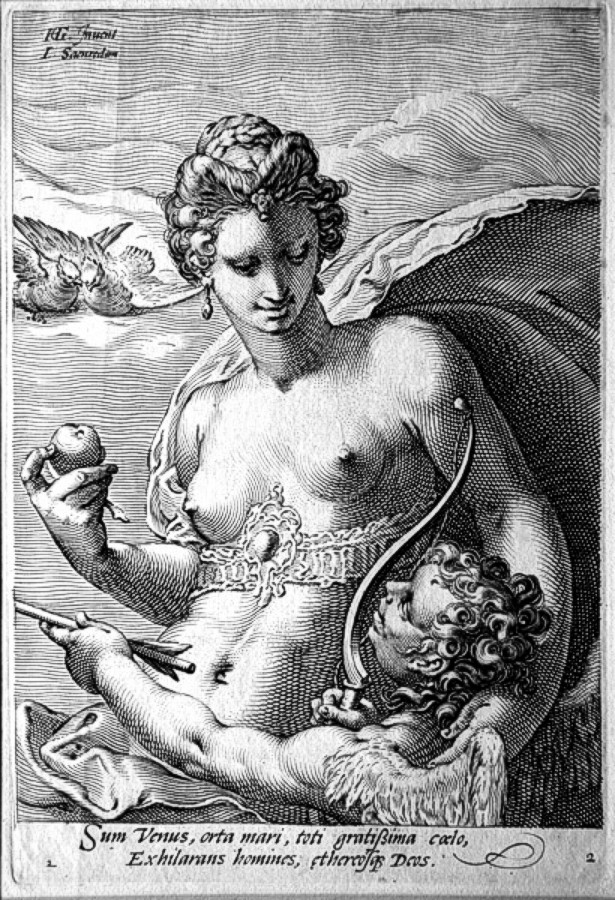
Venus and Cupid

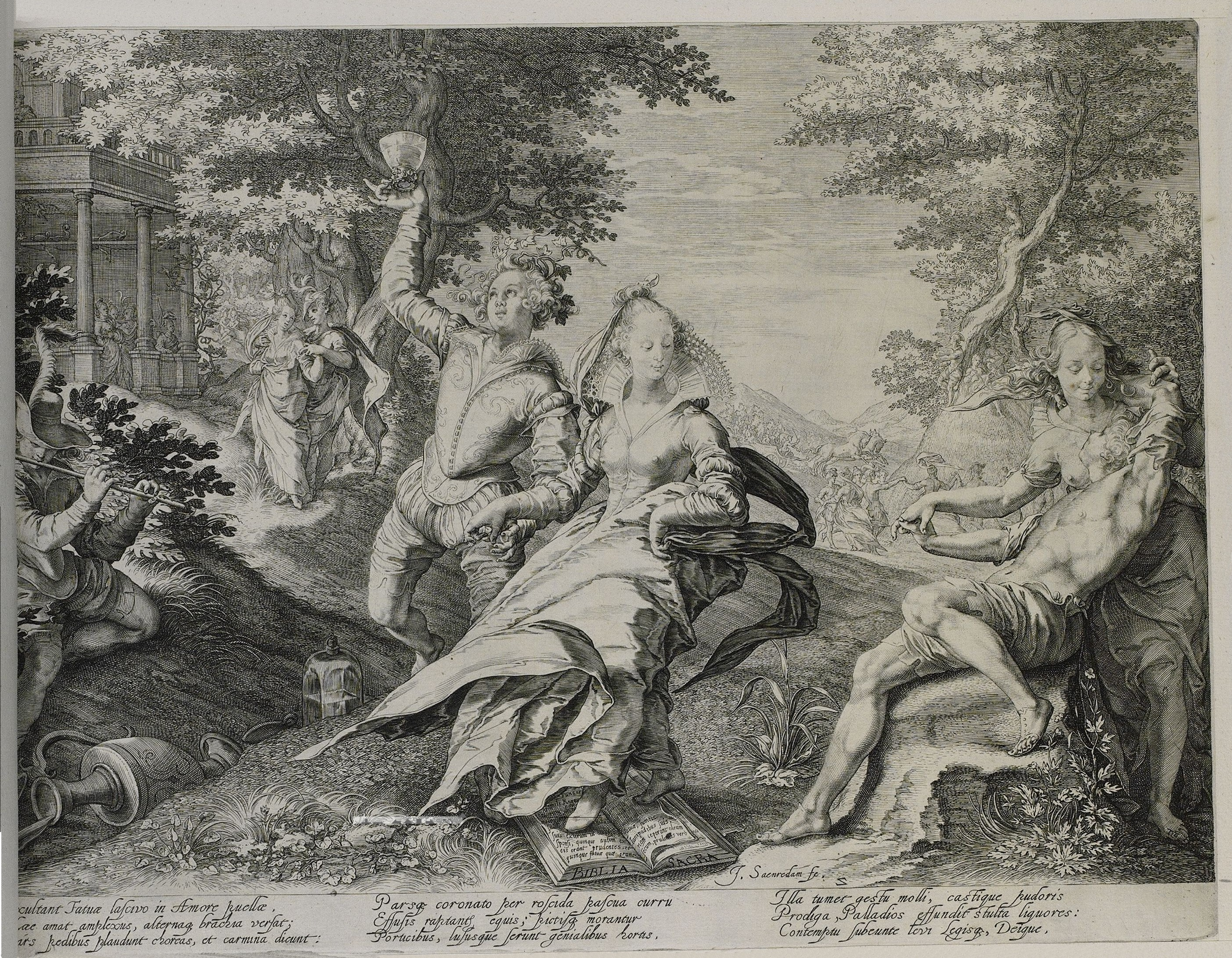
The Foolish Virgins

Jan Pieterszoon (abbr. Pietersz.) Saenredam (c. 1565 – 6 April 1607) was a Dutch Northern Mannerist painter, printmaker in engraving, and cartographer, and father of the painter of church interiors, Pieter Jansz Saenredam. He is noted for the many allegorical images he created from classical mythology and the Bible.

== Early life and education ==
Saenredam was born in Zaandam. As an orphan, Jan lived with his uncle, Pieter de Jongh, a bailiff in Assendelft who first sent him to learn basket weaving as a profession.

Being an apt student, he was taught reading and writing, but astonished his teachers when he proved already so accomplished in this that he decorated his texts with curled decorations. An example of his penmanship could once be seen on display at Assum House near Heemskerk (residence of the Lord of Assendelft), which was his copywork of the ten commandments.

Despite a decision that he follow a career in a trade or farming, he showed such artistic talent that he started as an apprentice cartographer. His first map is dated 1589 and is of the province of Holland, which could be seen in the city book of Guiccardijn (referring to a 1593 work by Lodovico Guicciardini called The Description of the Low Countries).

He was visited by a lawyer called Spoorwater tot Assendelft, who convinced his guardian to let him apply his gift, and thus young Saenredam was sent to learn drawing from Hendrick Goltzius in Haarlem, where he became a master at the age of 24 (in 1589).

After working for some time with Goltzius, he encountered the almost inevitable professional rivalry and jealousy, prompting his departure to work in Amsterdam for two years.

== Career ==
He then returned to Assendelft where he married and set up his own workshop. His first engraving was of the 12 apostles after a drawing by Karel van Mander. He produced prints after Goltzius, Abraham Bloemaert, Cornelis van Haarlem, Polidoro da Caravaggio, and his own invention. He made over 170 plates of which the last one was a history of Diana and Callisto by Paulus Moreelse in 1606. Two plates he was working on, after drawings by Bartholomeus Spranger and Willem Thibaut, were finished later by Jacob Matham.

According to the Rijksmuseum, he returned in 1595 from Amsterdam to Assendelft, where he married Anna Pauwelsdochter (abbr. Pauwelsdr.).

== Death ==
He died of typhus on April 6, 1607, and was buried in the choir of the Saint Adolphus church at Assendelft, with the gravestone inscription Ioannis Saenredam Sculptoris celeberrimi. He died in Assendelft, aged about 41.

Jan left his wife a sizeable estate as a result of lucrative investments in the Dutch East India Company.
