= Interior of the Sint-Odulphuskerk in Assendelft =

1649 painting by Pieter Jansz. Saenredam

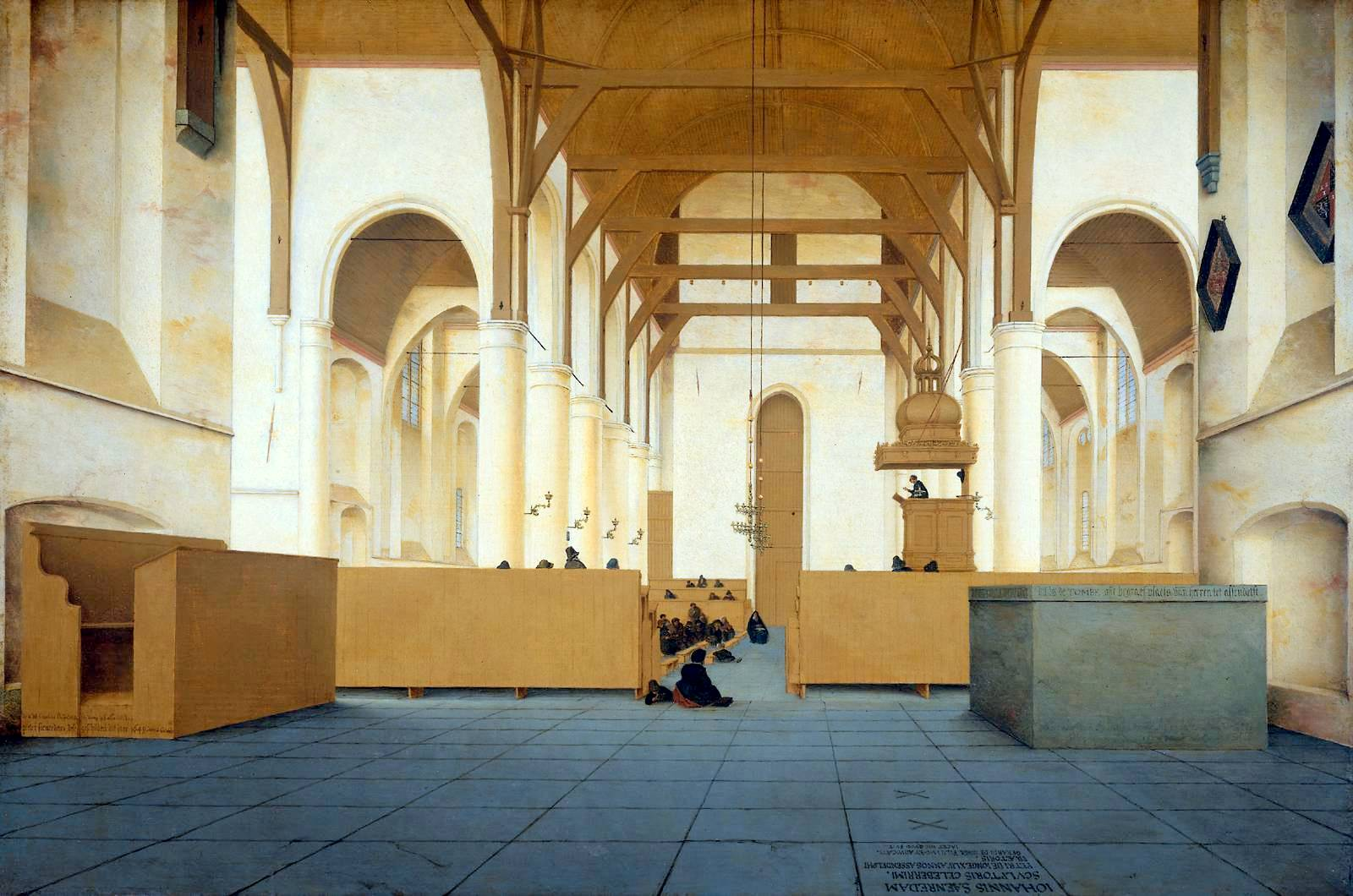

Interior of the Sint-Odulphuskerk in Assendelft is a 1649 painting by the Dutch artist Pieter Jansz. Saenredam (1597-1665), showing the interior of a church in Assendelft. It is now in the Rijksmuseum in Amsterdam.

The artist had decided to specialize in architectural interiors in 1628 and made his first sketches for this work in 1633–1634. He then used these as the basis for a 1643 preparatory drawing to establish the perspective, finally completing the painting itself on 2 October 1649, as shown by the date painted on the bench to the left.

== Sources ==
- https://www.rijksmuseum.nl/nl/collectie/SK-C-217
