= Liesbeth Helmus =

Dutch art historian and curator (born 1961)

Liesbeth M. Helmus
- Born: 1961 (age 64–65)
- Education: Centraal Museum, Vrije Universiteit Amsterdam, researcher
- Occupations: Art historian, curator

Liesbeth M. Helmus (born 1961) is a Dutch art historian and Senior Curator of Old Masters at the Centraal Museum in Utrecht. Known for her expertise in Dutch and Flemish painting, particularly from the 16th and 17th centuries, she has made contributions to the study and presentation of art history through exhibitions, publications, and collaborative research projects.

== Education and career ==
Helmus studied art history at the Vrije Universiteit Amsterdam, where her research interests focused on the artistic exchanges between the Netherlands and Italy during the Renaissance. This focus on international artistic influences has shaped her curatorial career and academic publications.

In 1996, she became the Curator of Old Masters at the Centraal Museum, overseeing a collection of pre-1850 artworks, including paintings, sculptures, and works on paper. Her tenure at the museum has been marked by extensive published research and exhibitions Dutch art.

== Major exhibitions ==
Helmus has curated several exhibitions, including:

- The Madonnas of Jan van Scorel 1495-1562: Serial Production of a Cherished Motif (2000): A detailed examination of the workshop practices of Jan van Scorel and his influence on Marian iconography.
- Pieter Saenredam, The Utrecht Work: Paintings and Drawings by the 17th-Century Master of Perspective (2002): A comprehensive showcase of Saenredam's depictions of Utrecht's church interiors.
- Pleasure and Piety: The Art of Joachim Wtewael (1566–1638) (2015–2016): The first major retrospective of Wtewael's work, focusing on his mastery of Mannerism.
- Utrecht, Caravaggio and Europe (2018–2019): An exhibition examining the influence of Caravaggio on Utrecht painters, which she co-curated with Bernd Ebert.

== Publications ==
Helmus has authored and contributed to numerous scholarly works, including:

- ‘‘Schilderkunst tot 1850’’ (1999): A catalog of the Centraal Museum’s painting collection up to 1850.
- ‘‘De Madonna’s van Jan van Scorel 1495-1562: Serieproductie van een Geliefd Motief’’ (2000): A study of Jan van Scorel’s Madonna paintings.
- ‘‘Pieter Saenredam, The Utrecht Work’’ (2002): Co-authored with Arie de Groot, a detailed study of Saenredam’s architectural art.
- ‘‘Utrecht, Caravaggio and Europe’’ (2018): A publication accompanying the exhibition of the same name.
- De Bentvueghels. Een berucht kunstgenootschap in Rome 1620–1720' (2023).
