= Antonius Mathijsen =

Dutch army surgeon

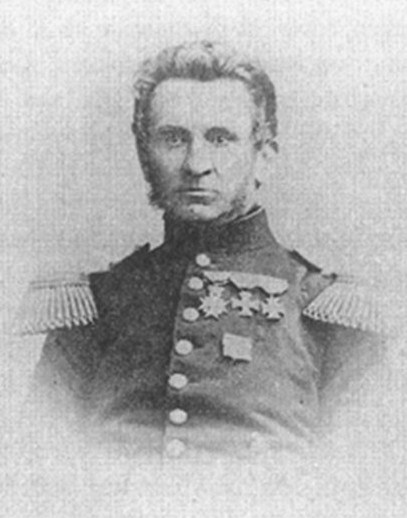
Antonius Mathijsen

Antonius Mathijsen (November 4, 1805 – June 15, 1878) was a Dutch army surgeon who first used plaster of Paris to fixate broken bones in a plaster cast.

== Biography ==
=== Early life and education ===
Antonius Mathijsen was born November 4, 1805, to a village physician in Budel, a Dutch town on the Belgian border. He was educated at hospitals in Maastricht, Brussels and the army medical school in Utrecht.

=== Career ===
He received his commission as medical officer 3d class in the Royal Netherlands Army in 1828. In 1838 he participated in the 10-day war of Belgian Revolution.

While working in Haarlem at the military hospital in 1851, Mathijsen first used plaster of Paris as a bandage. Until then a Belgian method was used with starch that took up to a day to dry and harden. Across the street he watched workers repairing cracks in the church with strips of jute dunked in plaster of Paris. He reasoned that a jute bandage soaked in water and plaster of Paris applied in the same way as the Belgian method would harden within a few minutes and thus made a better fixation for broken bones. After testing his idea on chickens he published his findings in a Dutch medical magazine Repertorium in February 1852. In 1853 his idea was praised by a research panel for its value to the military, "especially on the battlefield". Haarlemmers remembered him as "Uncle Plaster" or "Oom Gips".

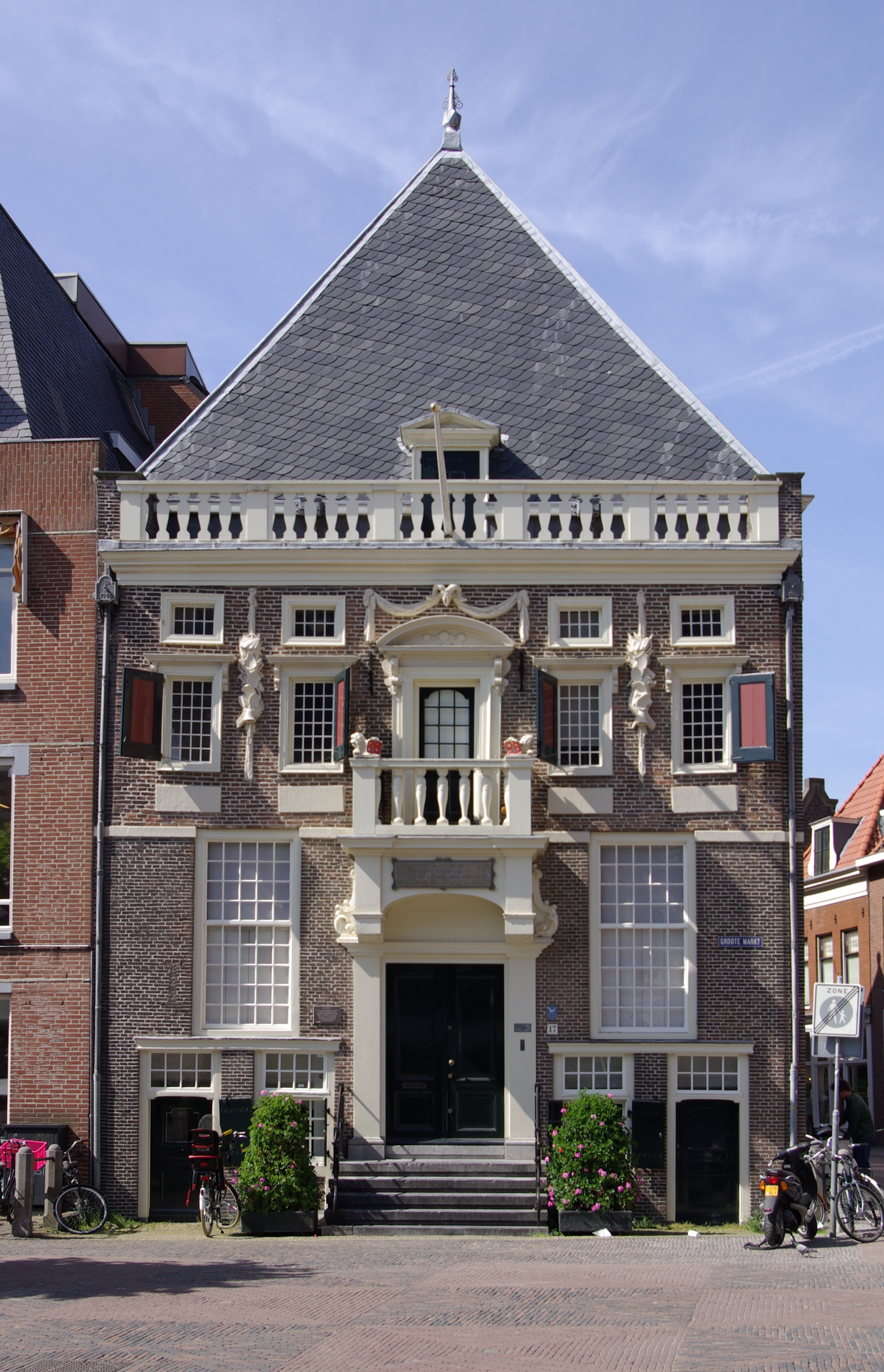
The military hospital was located in Hoofdwacht, Haarlem across from the church

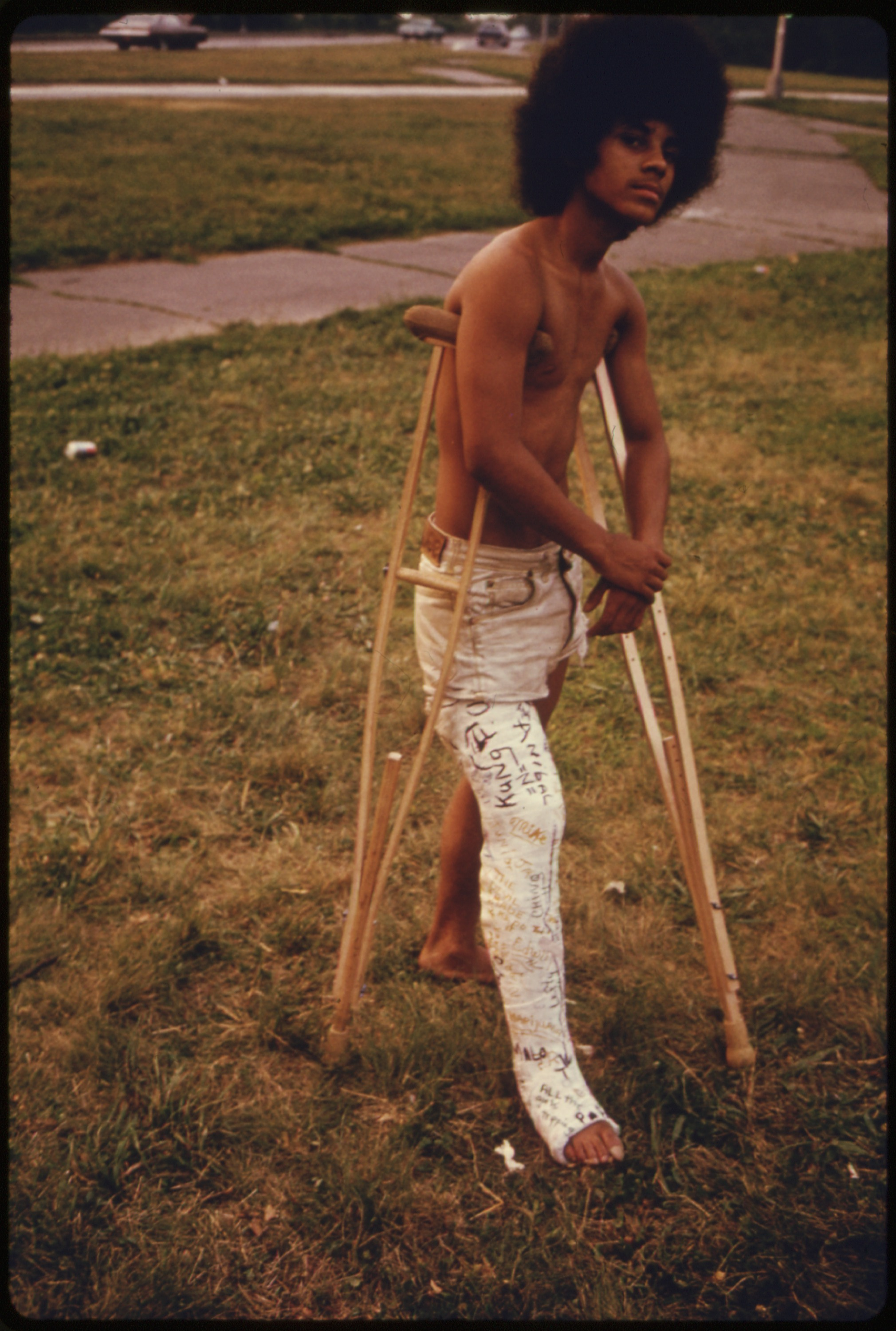
Young man in full leg plaster cast in 1974

He retired from the army in 1868 as first medical officer first class (Lieutenant Colonel).

=== Death ===
Mathijsen died June 15, 1878, aged 72, in Hamont.

== Memorials ==
Memorial monuments are located in both Budel and Hamont. The last Dutch army hospital in Utrecht was named after Dr Mathijsen until the army hospital merged with the navy hospital in the early 1990s.

== Decorations and awards ==
- Metalen kruis (metal cross)
- Order of the Oak Crown
