= Interior of St Bavo's Church in Haarlem =

1636 painting by Pieter Jansz Saenredam

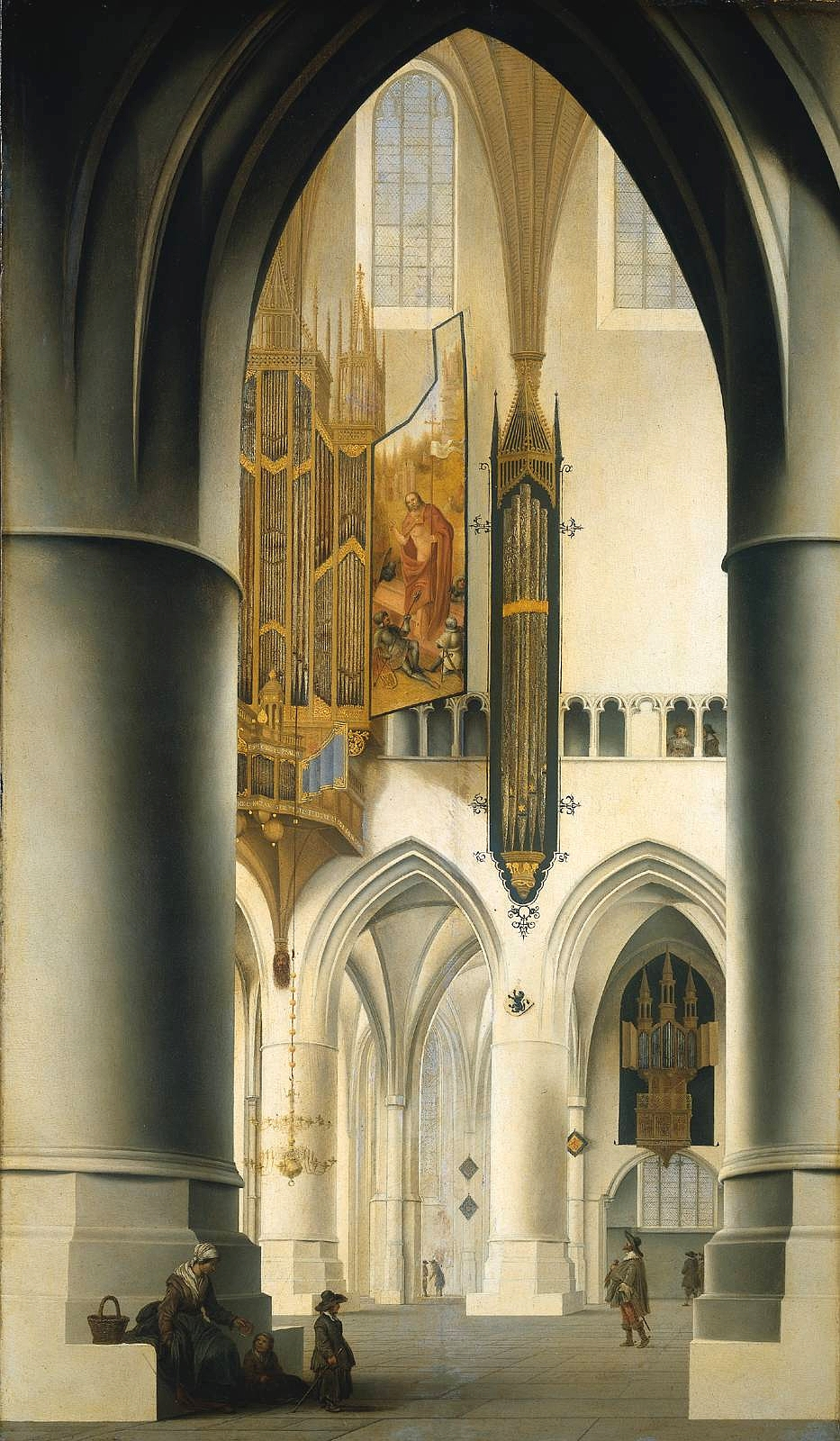
- Artist: Pieter Jansz Saenredam
- Year: 1636
- Location: Rijksmuseum, Amsterdam

Interior of St Bavo's Church in Haarlem is a 1636 oil on panel painting by the Dutch artist Pieter Jansz Saenredam, now in the Rijksmuseum Amsterdam. As the title suggests, it shows a view of the interior of St Bavo's Church in the Dutch town of Haarlem.
