= Hoofdwacht, Haarlem =

Guard House
- Hoofdwacht
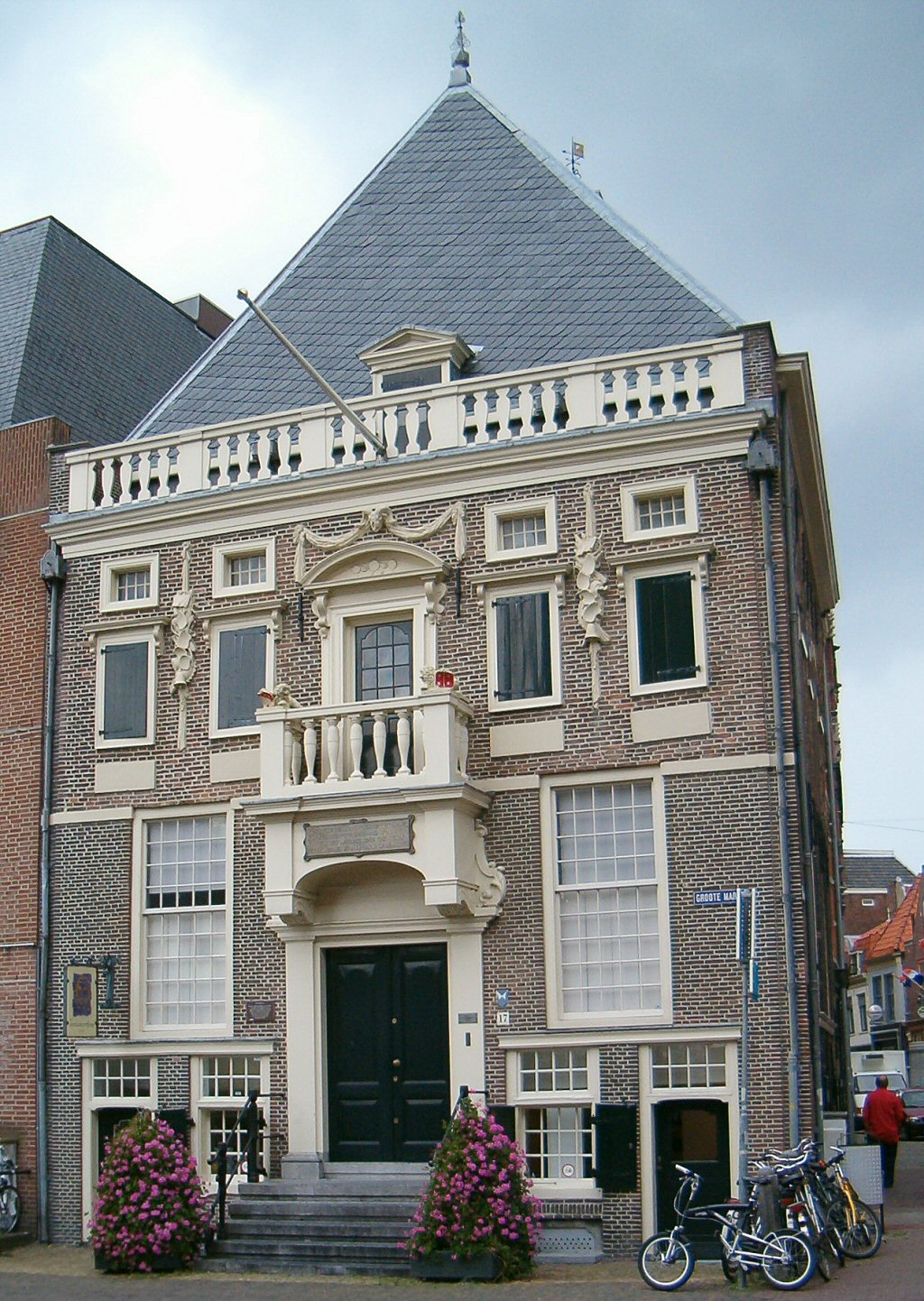
- Hoofdwacht Haarlem

General information
- Status: Rijksmonument
- Location: Haarlem
- Address: Grote Markt 17
- Country: Netherlands
- Coordinates: 52°22′54″N 4°38′11.36″E
- Owner: City of Haarlem
- Designations: Rijksmonument

Website
- www.haerlem.nl

The Hoofdwacht (Head Watch, or "Civic guard headquarters") is a historically important rijksmonument. It was built in the 13th century and it is considered the oldest building in Haarlem, Netherlands. It has served as a printshop for Coornhert, as a temporary council meeting location across from City Hall and even as a jail. It is located on the Grote Markt across from the St. Bavochurch.

== History ==
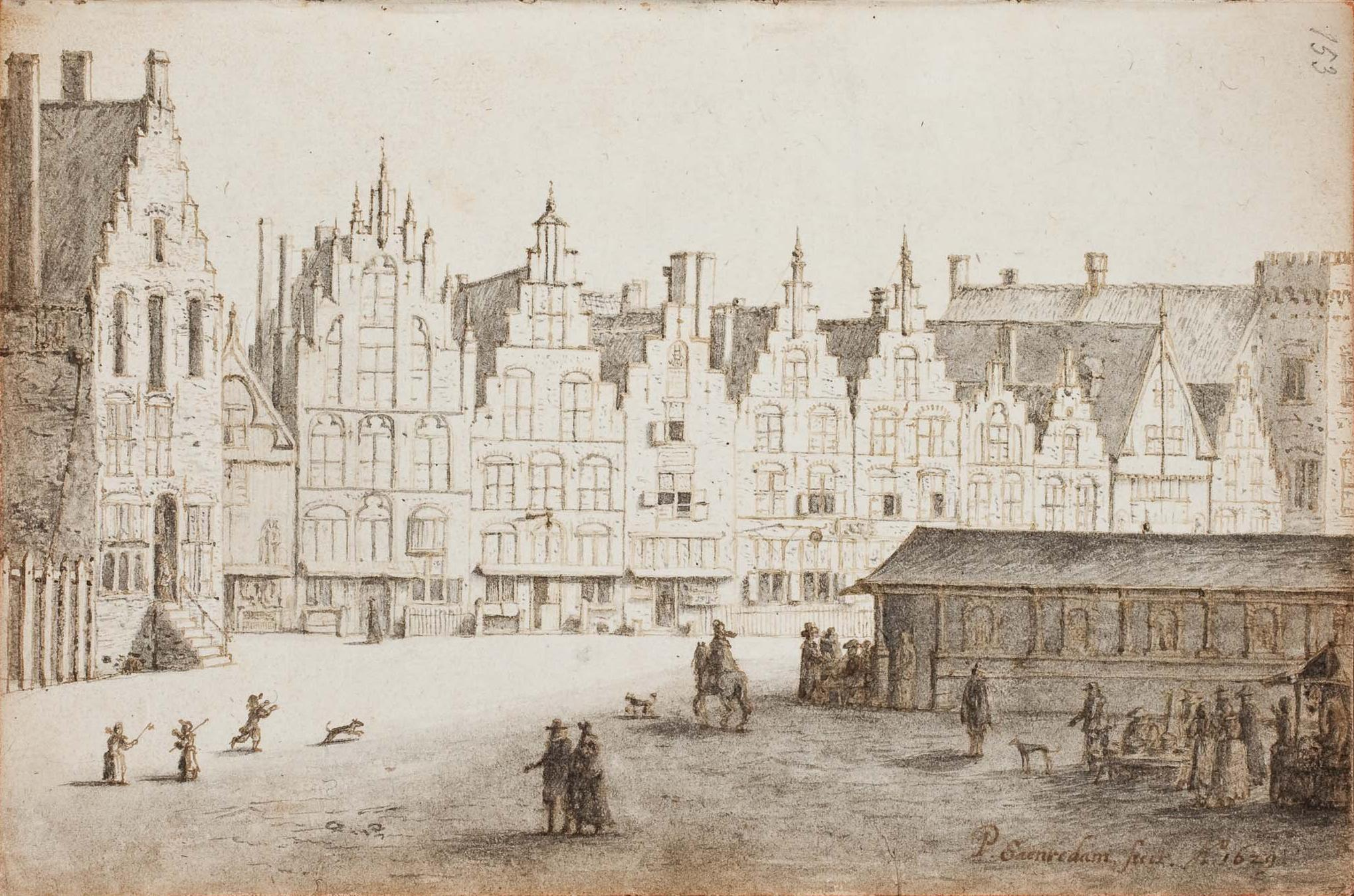
The Hoofwacht on the left before the balcony was added, shown in a sketch of the Grote Markt looking eastwards towards the Smedesstraat and the Klokhuisplein. On the right, the fish market (today much smaller) enjoys the shade on the north side of the St. Bavochurch. By Pieter Jansz Saenredam in 1629

From 1250 to around 1350 the building served as the first city hall of Haarlem. After the current city hall was built across the square, various important families lived in the house. The lower part of the building was used as a printing shop, a general store and for storing beer. Though it had lost its official function, as a large and imposing building in medieval Haarlem, it continued to be used for council meetings whenever the Count of Holland was visiting. A plaque above the door states:

Wanneer de Graef hier op het Sand Sijn Princenwoning had geplant, So was dit loflijk oud gesticht. Tot Haerlems Raedhuys opgericht

— see photo

This text in old Dutch says that whenever the Count "planted his court here on the sand" (meaning when he stayed in the large "Gravenzaal" or Count's hall across the square), this honorable building was put to use as the courthouse. The humanist Dirck Volckertszoon Coornhert once ran a printshop from the basement in the 16th century. The baroque facade is newer and dates from circa 1650.

On May 17, 1755 the building was bought by the municipality to serve as headquarters for the civic guard (schutterij). This is the reason for the building's current name. Each evening and morning the gates of the city would be unlocked by the militia who lived here.

== Town Jail ==
Until the Spaarne prison was built on the east side of the river (known as the Koepelgevangenis) in 1899, there were a few jail rooms upstairs here. Before 1755, prisoners were kept in the cellar of the city hall across the street, which was often quite damp, but open to the street level and allowed some exchange with townsfolk in the rear alleyway. After sentencing, prisoners received public humiliation though corporal punishment such as branding, eye gouging, or execution, but for minor crimes they were sent to the Tuchthuis, the local workhouse. Coornhert wrote the first treatise on criminals and pleaded for more humane treatment. The latter 17th century saw some reforms and a restriction in public executions, which came to be seen as barbaric.

After 1755, keeping the prisoners upstairs significantly improved their living conditions, but it also saw a change in the purpose of their stay, as they had no contact anymore with the outside world. Before this change, prisoners were only held until sentencing, and their stay in jail was relatively short and not considered part of their punishment. With abolishment of public displays of corporal punishment, there was no solution for convicted felons that were not suited for the workhouse. For these prisoners, imprisonment became their punishment, but there was no longer any need to house them near the courthouse or near the Grote Markt. This building could not house longer term prisoners and thus the jail function was moved.

== Sentinel post ==
For a short period the Hoofdwacht was in use as a military hospital, where Antonius Mathijsen made his discovery of the orthopedic plaster cast in 1851. The upstairs was also the place where the watchmen would stand guard near the balcony. The church opposite had a sentry lookout posted in the steeple who could signal the guards on the balcony using red flags so that the guards in the Hoofdwacht could react to fires or other unrest. This sentry position was still in use in 1919.

Since 1919 the building has been occupied by the Haarlem historical association Historische vereniging Haerlem, which uses it today for its meetings and small public exhibitions on the history of Haarlem. From May to September it is open to the public as a free "mini-museum" on weekend afternoons from 1:00-5:00 PM.
