= Pieter Jansz. Saenredam =

Painter of the Dutch Golden Age

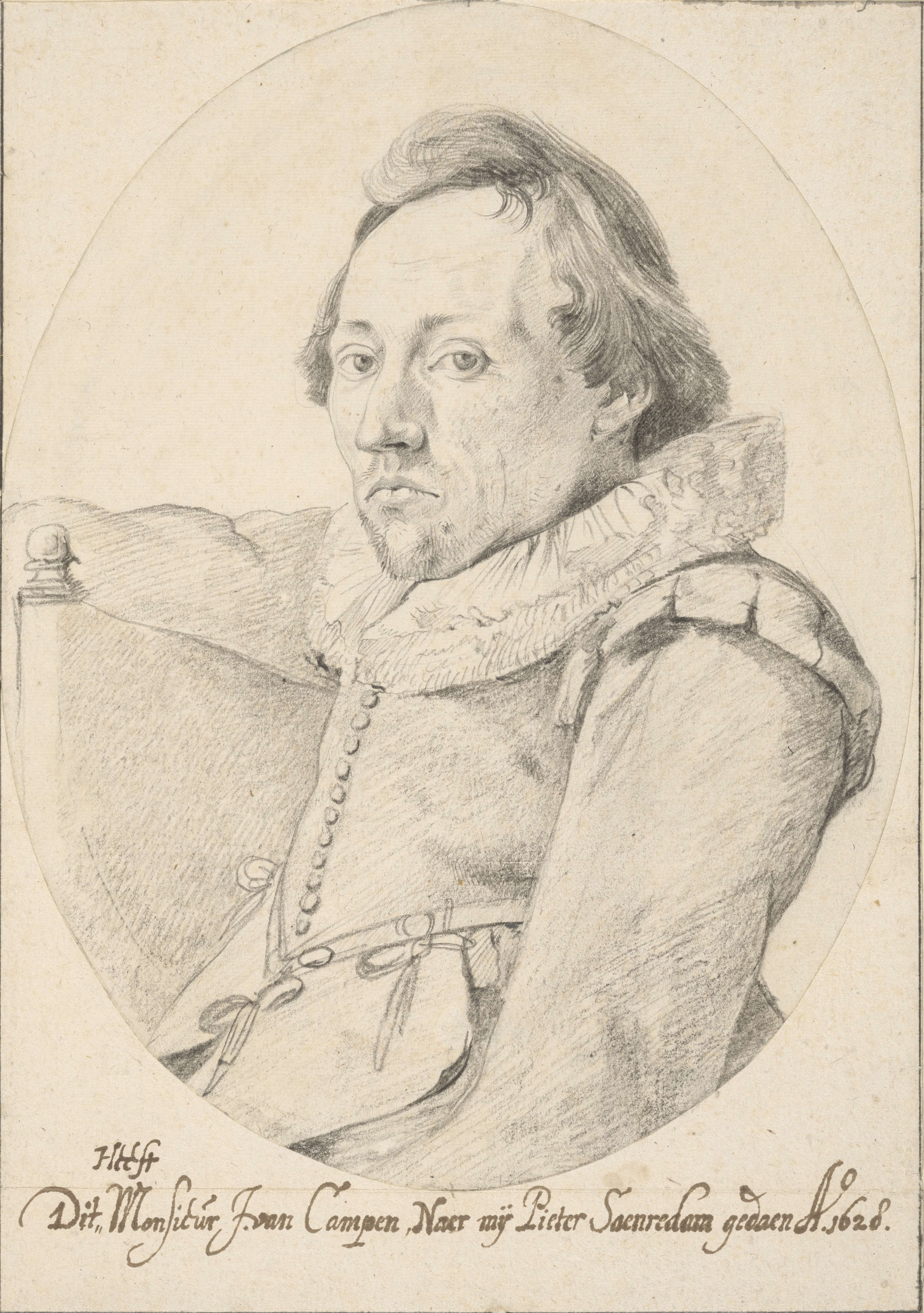
- Pieter Saenredam in 1628 by Jacob van Campen
- Born: 9 June 1597; Assendelft
- Died: 31 May 1665 (aged 67); Haarlem
- Parent: Jan Pietersz Saenredam

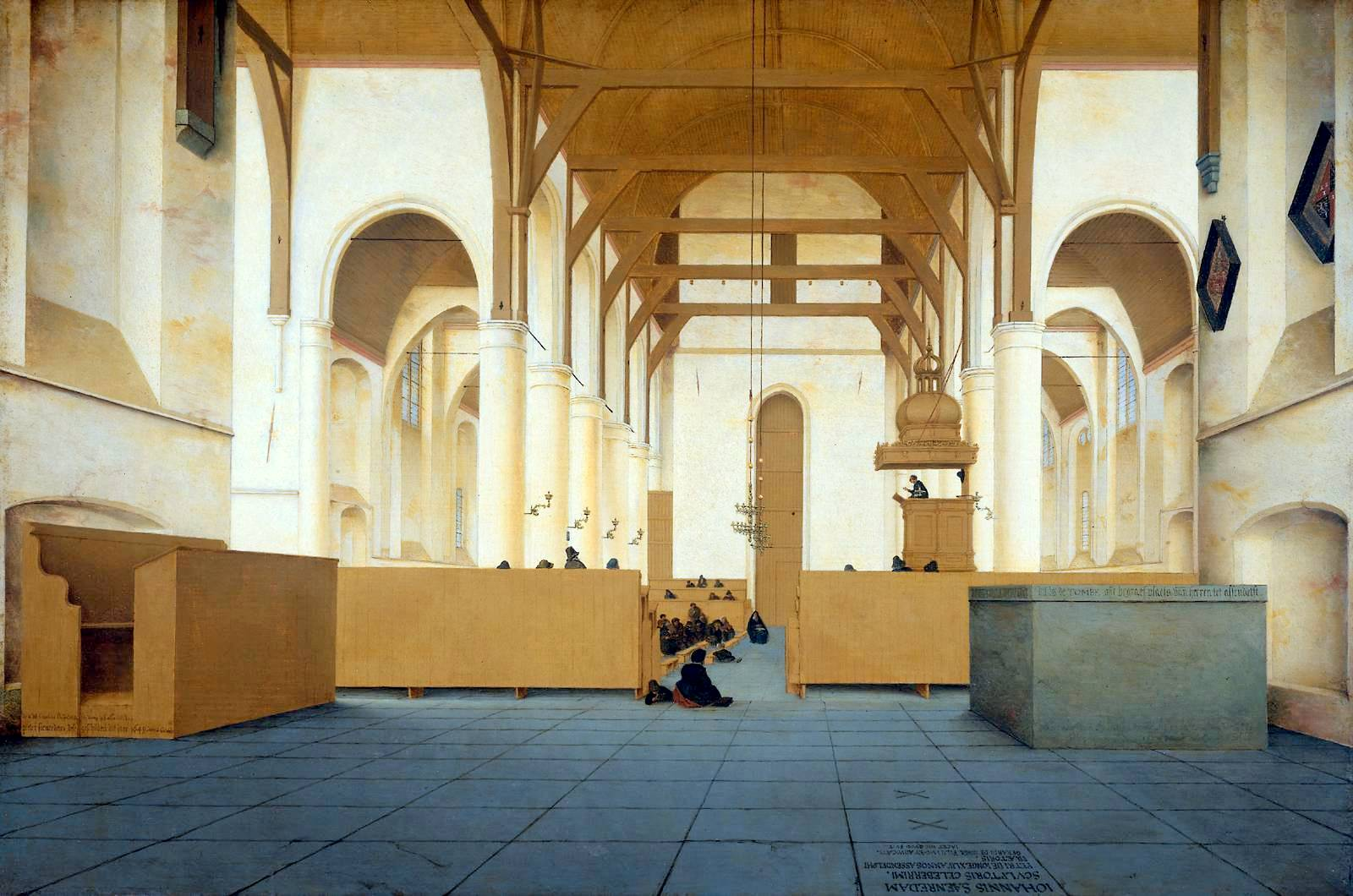
Interior of the Sint-Odulphuskerk in Assendelft (1649), oil on panel, with the gravestone of Saenredam's father in the foreground

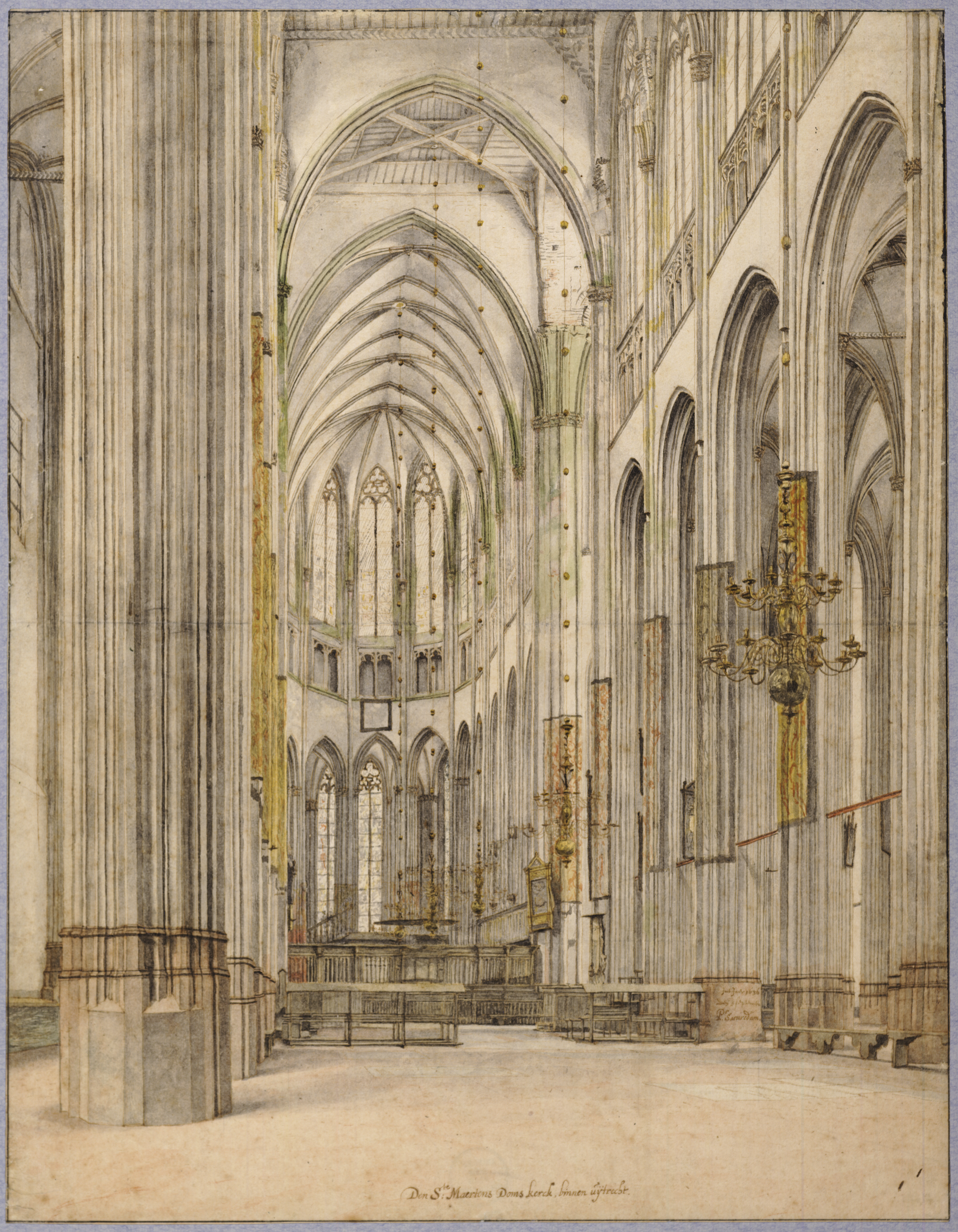
Interior of St. Martin's Cathedral, Utrecht (1636), drawing on paper

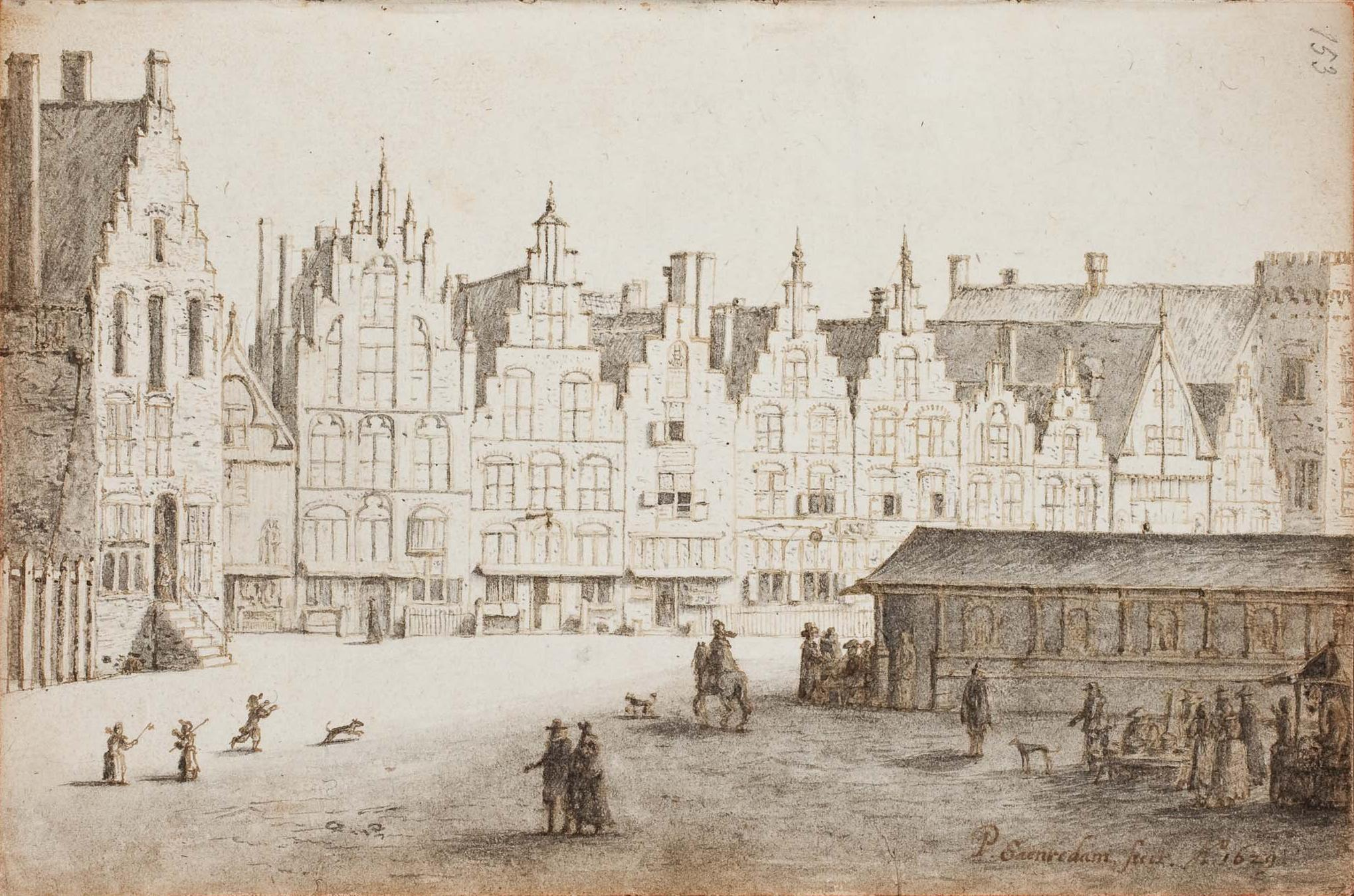
View of the Markt in Haarlem (1629), including the Hoofwacht on the left. Pen and brush on paper.

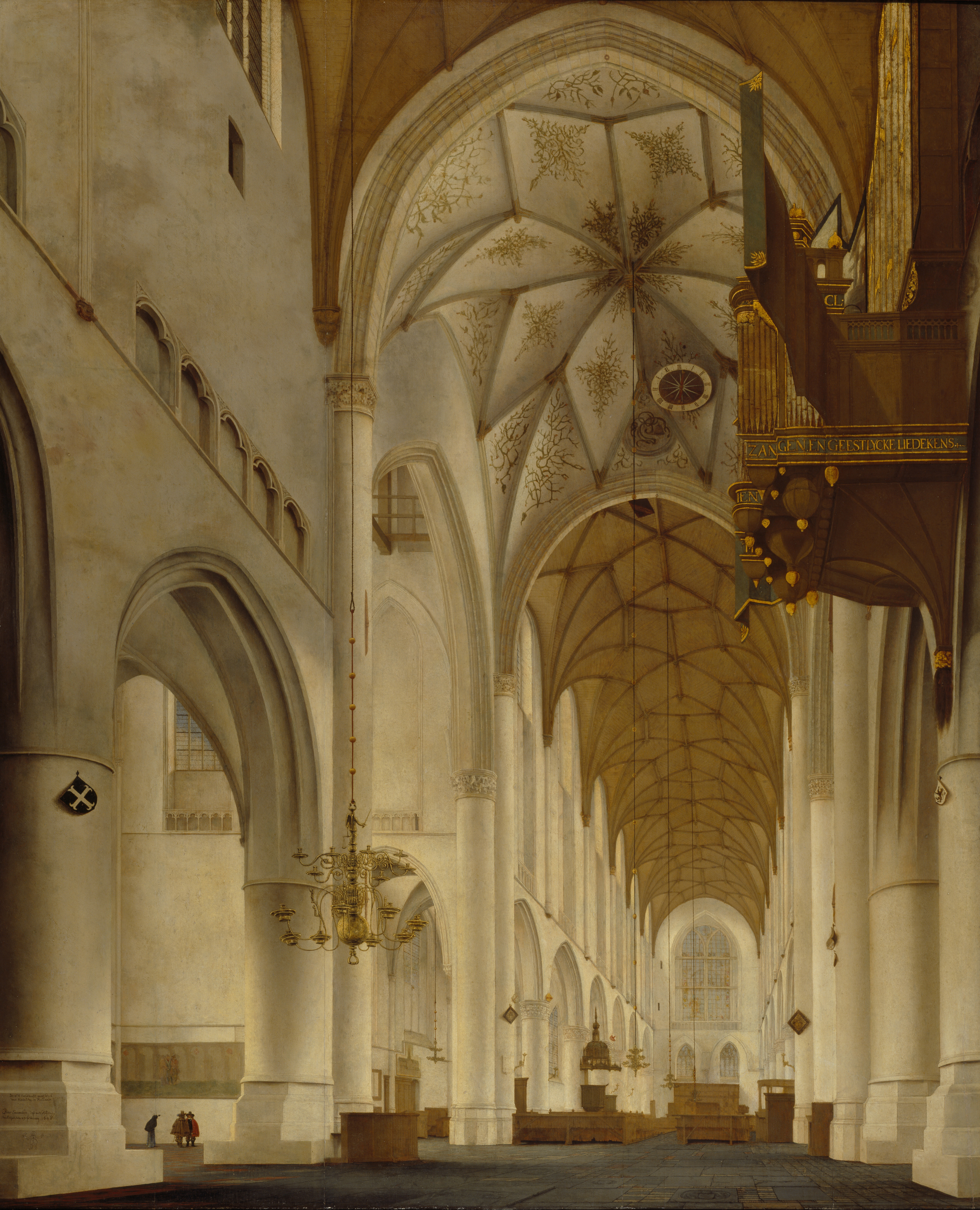
Interior of the Church of St Bavo in Haarlem (1648), oil on panel. The work is typical of Saenredam's perspective paintings of whitewashed church interiors.

Pieter Janszoon (abbr. Jansz.) Saenredam (9 June 1597 – buried 31 May 1665) was a painter of the Dutch Golden Age, known for his distinctive paintings of whitewashed church interiors such as Interior of St Bavo's Church in Haarlem (1636) and Interior of the Sint-Odulphuskerk in Assendelft.

== Biography ==
Saenredam was born in Assendelft, the son of the Northern Mannerist printmaker and draughtsman Jan Pietersz Saenredam. In 1612, Saenredam moved permanently to Haarlem, where he became a pupil of Frans de Grebber. In 1623, he became a member of the Haarlem Guild of St. Luke. A drawing in the British Museum by his friend Jacob van Campen shows him to be very short and hunch backed. He died in Haarlem.

Saenredam was a contemporary of the painter-architects Jacob van Campen, Salomon de Bray, and Pieter Post.

== Works ==
Saenredam specialised in the representation of church interiors. These pictures were based on precise measurements of the building and meticulously rendered sketches, done on site, in pencil, pen, and chalk, after which washes were applied. Painting took place in the studio, often years after the studies were made.

Saenredam's emphasis on even light and geometry is brought out by comparing his works with those of the rather younger Emanuel de Witte, who included people, contrasts of light and such clutter of church furniture as remained in Calvinist churches, all usually ignored by Saenredam. Unlike de Witte's, Saenredam's views are usually roughly aligned with a main axis of the church.

Saenredam's paintings frequently show medieval churches, usually Gothic, but sometimes late Romanesque, which had been stripped bare of their original decorations after the iconoclasm of the Protestant Reformation. Although Utrecht was the centre of the remaining Catholic population of the mainly Calvinist United Provinces, all the old churches were retained by the Protestants. The drawing for Saenredam's Interior of St. Martin's Cathedral, Utrecht (above) is typical. As a Catholic church the cathedral had been heavily decorated. When the Church fell into Protestant ownership during the Dutch Revolt, the altarpieces and statuary were removed, and the walls and ceiling were painted white.

Alternatively, the paintings of church interiors by Saenredam and other 17th-century Dutch painters have been interpreted as having less to do with religion and more with the new-found interest in perspective and with the Dutch interpretation (known as Dutch Classicism) of Palladio's theories of proportion, balance and symmetry.

In any case, Saenredam wanted to record this time of change by documenting the country's buildings. Many artists before him had specialised in imaginary and fanciful architecture, but Saenredam was one of the first to focus on existing buildings. According to the J. Paul Getty Trust "Saenredam's church paintings...owe their poetry to his remarkable blend of fact and fiction. He began by making site drawings of buildings that record measurements and detail with archaeological thoroughness." These meticulous measurements aided him in using scientific linear perspective, allowing him to create images featuring realistic depth.

There is a small number of Saenredam's works in British collections but the Utrecht Archives houses a large number of Saenredam's drawings. In 2000–2001, the Centraal Museum at Utrecht held a major exhibition of his drawings and paintings.

Perhaps his best known works are a matching pair of oil paintings both titled Interior of the Buurkerk, Utrecht. One hangs in London's National Gallery, the other in the Kimbell Art Museum in Fort Worth, Texas. In their simplicity and semi-abstract formalism, they foreshadow more modern works such as those of Mondrian and Feininger.

In July 2012, a picture of Saenredam's village at Assendelft was sold at Christie's for more than £3,500,000. Six months earlier it was entered into a Christie's sale advertised as by a follower of Saenredam with an estimate of between £3,000-5,000 before being withdrawn from sale.

== Bibliography ==
- Hans Jantzen, Das Niederländische Architekturbild, Braunschweig, Klinkhardt & Biermann, 1910
- Maillet, Bernard G. (2012). La Peinture Architecturale des Ecoles du Nord : les Intérieurs d'Eglises 1580-1720. Pandora Publishers Wijnegem. ISBN 9789053253373.
