= Assendelft =

Village in North Holland, Netherlands

- Town
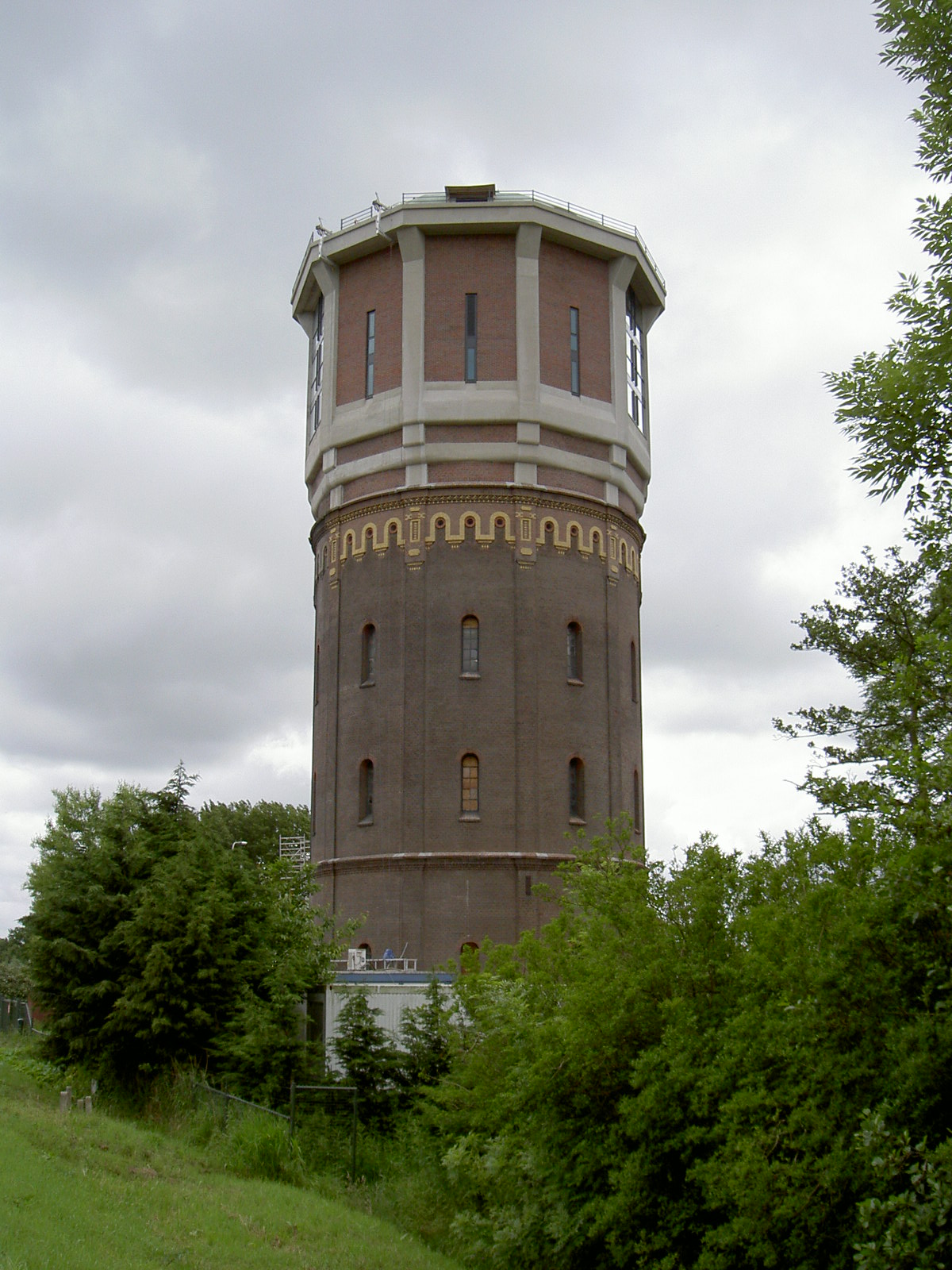
- The water tower of Assendelft

- Flag Coat of arms

- Location in the Netherlands Location in the province of North Holland in the Netherlands
- Coordinates: 52°28′N 4°45′E
- Country: Netherlands
- Province: North Holland
- Municipality: Zaanstad

Area
  - Total: 31.89 km^{2} (12.31 sq mi)
- Elevation: −1.0 m (−3.3 ft)

Population (2021)
  - Total: 24,230
  - Density: 759.8/km^{2} (1,968/sq mi)
- Time zone: UTC+1 (CET)
  - Summer (DST): UTC+2 (CEST)
- Postal code: 1566 & 1567
- Dialing code: 075
- Major roads: A8 N8 / N246 N203

Assendelft (Dutch pronunciation: [ˌɑsə(n)ˈdɛl(ə)ft]) is a town in the province of North Holland, Netherlands. It is a part of the municipality of Zaanstad. Assendelft was a separate municipality until 1974, when the municipality of Zaanstad was formed. However, Assendelft didn't want to be part of Zaanstad and pled together with Krommenie to be part of a new municipality called Krommenie-Assendelft. Zaanstad is part of the Amsterdam Agglomeration (GA).

The North Sea Canal connects Assendelft with Amsterdam and Velsen, and it lies about 13 km northeast of Haarlem and about 15 km south of Alkmaar.

== History ==
Assendelft is one of the oldest settlements in North Holland, with signs of settlement dating from as early as 500BC. The earliest written form of the name appears as 'Ascmannedilf' in 1063. The name is derived from the old Germanic word for Norsemen, 'Ascomanni', 'dilf' most likely meaning 'dug by'.

== Train services ==
The town is served by Krommenie-Assendelft railway station. From here, there are four trains an hour to Amsterdam, with a journey time of 25 minutes.

== Rural culture ==
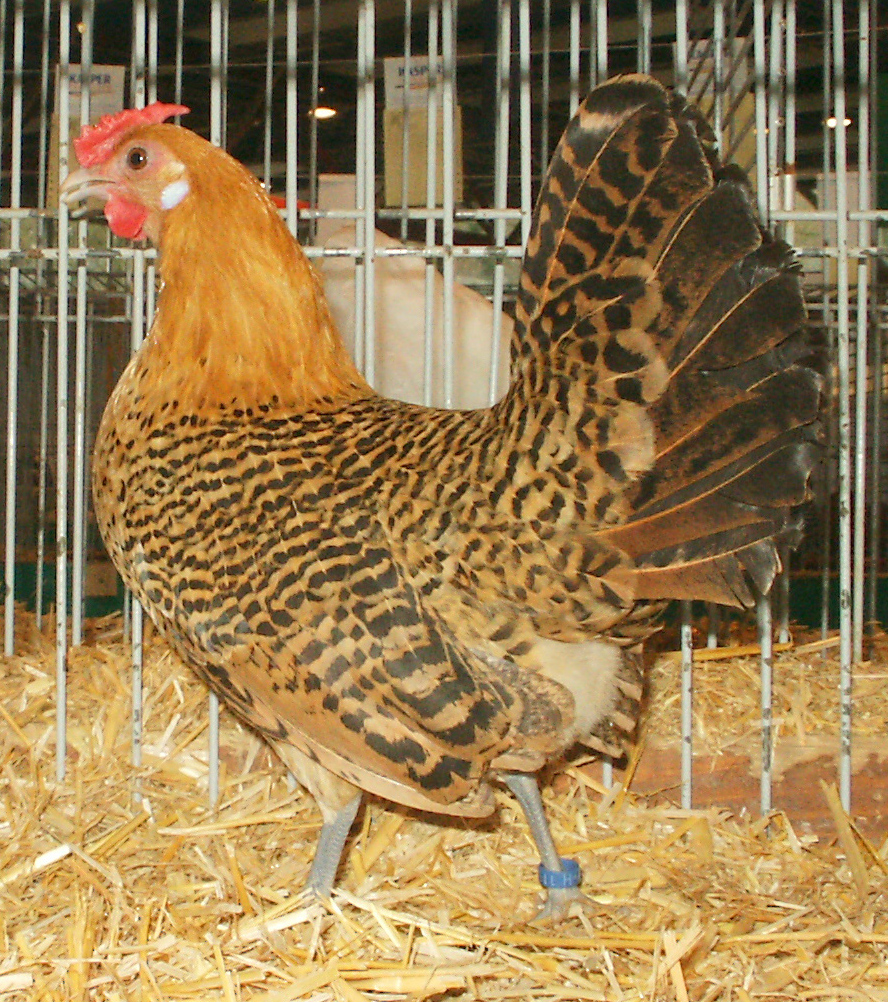
Assendelfter bantam

Known is the local chicken breed, called "Assendelfter". It is an ancient pencilled breed, related to the pencilled Hamburg chicken.
