= The Hiding Place (film) =

1975 film

- Theatrical release poster
- Directed by: James F. Collier
- Written by: Allan Sloane; Lawrence Holben (screenplay); Corrie ten Boom; John and Elizabeth Sherrill (book)
- Produced by: Frank R. Jacobson; William F. Brown
- Starring: Julie Harris; Eileen Heckart; Arthur O'Connell; Jeannette Clift
- Cinematography: Michael Reed
- Edited by: Ann Chegwidden
- Music by: Tedd Smith
- Distributed by: World Wide Pictures
- Release date: May 1975
- Running time: 150 minutes
- Country: United States
- Language: English

The Hiding Place is a 1975 film based on the autobiographical novel The Hiding Place by Corrie ten Boom. The film recounts the ten Boom family's experiences in the Netherlands as they provide a hiding place for Jewish refugees during the Holocaust, which leads to their arrest and imprisonment in the Ravensbrück concentration camp.

It was directed by James F. Collier and stars Jeannette Clift as Corrie, Julie Harris as Betsie ten Boom, and Arthur O'Connell as Casper ten Boom in his final film appearance. It was produced by World Wide Pictures, the motion-picture ministry of the Billy Graham Evangelistic Association. The project originated after Graham's wife, Ruth Graham, met ten Boom in Switzerland and recommended her story to the book's eventual authors.

The film's 1975 world premiere at the Beverly Theatre was disrupted by a tear-gas canister marked with a swastika, and the premiere resumed the next day. For her performance, Clift received nominations for the Golden Globe Award for New Star of the Year – Actress and the BAFTA Award for Most Promising Newcomer to Leading Film Roles.

== Plot ==
As the Nazis invade the Netherlands in 1940, Corrie (Jeannette Clift George) and the rest of her family bravely choose to open their home to Jews as a hiding place, trusting that God would help them to do this. A part of their home is specially remodeled by members of the Dutch resistance to form a hidden room that the Jews can escape to in the event of a Nazi raid. The family makes several mistakes, such as allowing the Jews to sing so loudly on one occasion that it disturbed the neighbors, but the Jews remained safely hidden. However, after the betrayal of a Dutch collaborator, the house is raided by Nazis on February 28, 1944, and the entire family and its friends are arrested. The house is thoroughly searched, but the Jews and the hiding place are never found by authorities.

Corrie's father, Casper, dies before he reaches the concentration camp, and Corrie worries that she will never see her home again. The Nazis send Corrie and her sister, Betsie (Julie Harris), to the Ravensbrück concentration camp, Germany, for hiding Jews in their home. At the concentration camp, Betsie encourages Corrie to remain hopeful that God will rescue them from the brutalities they experience.

With little food, constant work and brutal treatment, the women suffer constantly, and Betsie dies. Ultimately, Corrie leaves the camp in December 1944 through what is discovered years later to have been a clerical error, as everyone else in her group of prisoners was exterminated by poison gas the next month (January 1945). Her life after the ordeal was dedicated to showing that Jesus's love is greater than the deepest pit of humanity.

== Cast ==
- Jeannette Clift as Corrie ten Boom
- Julie Harris as Betsie ten Boom
- Arthur O'Connell as Casper ten Boom a.k.a. "Papa"
- Robert Rietti as Willem ten Boom
- Pamela Sholto as Tine
- Paul Henley as Peter ten Boom
- Richard Wren as Kik ten Boom
- Broes Hartman as Dutch Policeman
- Lex van Delden as Young German Officer
- Tom van Beek as Dr. Heemstra
- Nigel Hawthorne as Pastor De Ruiter
- John Gabriel as Professor Zeiner
- Edward Burnham as Underground Leader
- Cyril Shaps as Building Inspector Smit
- Forbes Collins as Mason Smit
- Eileen Heckart as Katje
- Carol Gillies as The Prison Matron a.k.a. "The Snake"

== Production ==
The film was produced by World Wide Pictures, the motion-picture ministry of the Billy Graham Evangelistic Association. According to Billy Graham's autobiography, his wife, Ruth Graham, met Corrie ten Boom in Switzerland and was so impressed by her story that she recommended it to authors John and Elizabeth Sherrill. The Sherrills subsequently co-wrote the book The Hiding Place with ten Boom.

== Release ==
The film's 1975 world premiere at the Beverly Theatre in Beverly Hills, California, was disrupted when a tear gas canister marked with a swastika was thrown into the theater, forcing the crowd to evacuate. Billy Graham held an impromptu street meeting while police and fire departments investigated. At a reception later that evening, Corrie ten Boom commented on the incident, stating, "What we have to do is love these people who hate us—love them, pray for them. These people are wounded people who have hate in their hearts." Graham later noted that the "furor over the tear-gas canister created enormous interest in the film", which premiered successfully the following night. It became the most widely seen motion picture produced by World Wide Pictures.

== Reception ==
The New York Times critic Vincent Canby described the film as "pious" and noted that the performers' "Dutch accents sound quite Swedish on occasion".

For her performance as Corrie ten Boom, Jeannette Clift (credited as Jeanette Clift George) received nominations for the Golden Globe Award for New Star of the Year – Actress in 1976 and the BAFTA Award for Most Promising Newcomer to Leading Film Roles in 1978.

== See also ==
- List of American films of 1975
- List of Holocaust films
