= Ten Boom =

Ten Boom is a rather uncommon Dutch toponymic surname meaning "at the tree". It may refer to:

- Corrie ten Boom (1892–1983), author and Holocaust survivor who helped many Jews escape the Nazis during World War II
- Betsie ten Boom (1885–1944), Corrie's sister, also helped hide Jews in their home
- Casper ten Boom (1859–1944), father of Corrie and Betsie, also helped save Jews
