= The Hiding Place (biography) =

1971 book on the life of Corrie ten Boom

- First edition
- Author: Corrie ten Boom
- Language: English
- Genre: Nonfiction, autobiography
- Publisher: Chosen Books
- Publication date: November 1971
- Publication place: Netherlands
- Media type: hardcover
- Pages: 241 pp
- ISBN: 0-553-25669-6
- OCLC: 30489558

The Hiding Place is an autobiographical book written by Corrie ten Boom with John and Elizabeth Sherrill. It was published in 1971.

The Sherrills came up with the idea for The Hiding Place while doing research for another book of theirs called God's Smuggler, a book about Dutch Christian missionary Andrew van der Bijl. At the time, ten Boom was already in her mid-70s.

As one of van der Bijl's favorite traveling companions, ten Boom is referenced often in his recollections. In the preface to the book, the Sherrills recount:

...his [Brother Andrew's] fascinating stories about her in Vietnam, where she had earned that most honorable title "Double-old Grandmother" - and in a dozen other Communist countries - came to mind so often that we finally had to hold up her hands to stop his flow of reminiscence. "We could never fit her into the book," we said. "She sounds like a book in herself." It's the sort of thing you say, not meaning anything.

The title refers to both the literal hiding place where the ten Boom family hid Jews from the Nazis, and also to the Scriptural message found in Psalm 119:114: "Thou art my hiding place and my shield..."

== Plot ==
The book begins with the Ten Boom family celebrating the 100th anniversary of the family business; they sell and repair watches under the family's elderly father, Casper ten Boom. The business takes up the ground floor of the family home, known as the Béjé. Casper lives with his two unmarried daughters; Corrie, the narrator and a watchmaker herself, and Betsie, who takes care of the house. It seems as if everyone in the Dutch town of Haarlem has shown up to the party, including Corrie's sister Nollie, her brother Willem, and her nephews Peter and Kik. Willem, a minister in the Dutch Reformed Church, brings a Jewish man, who has just escaped from Germany. The man's beard has been burned off by some thugs, a grim reminder of what was happening just to the east of the Netherlands.

In the next few chapters, Corrie talks about her childhood, her infirm but glad-hearted mother, and the three aunts who once lived in the Béjé. Additionally, she talks about the only man she ever loved: a young man named Karel, who ultimately married a woman from a rich family.

Eventually, both Nollie and Willem marry. And after the deaths of Corrie's mother and aunts, Casper, Corrie and Betsie settle down into a pleasant domestic life. Later, in 1940, the Nazis invade the Netherlands.

Having strong morals based on Christian beliefs, the family feels obligated to help the Jews in every way possible. The Béjé soon becomes the centre of a major anti-Nazi operation. Corrie, who had grown to think of herself as a middle-aged spinster, becomes entangled in black market operations, uses stolen ration cards, and eventually hides Jews in her own home.

Corrie suffers a moral crisis over the lying, theft, forgery, and bribery that are necessary to keep the Jews that her family is hiding. Moreover, it is unlikely that her family will get away with helping Jews for long, as they have nowhere to hide them. The Dutch underground arranges for a secret room to be built in the Béjé so that the Jews will have a place to hide during an inevitable raid.

It is a constant struggle for Corrie to keep the Jews safe; she sacrifices her own safety and her personal room to give constant safety to the Jews. Rolf, a friend who is a police officer, trains her to be able to think clearly any time when the Nazis invade her home and start to question her.

When a man asks Corrie to help his wife who had been arrested, Corrie agrees, but with reservation. As it turns out, the man was a spy and the watch shop is raided. The entire family is arrested, along with the shop employees, but the Jews manage to stay hidden in the secret room.

Casper is now in his mid-80s, and a Nazi official offers to let him go if he agrees to cause no more trouble. Casper does not agree and states that if he is set free, he will return home and help the first person who asks him for it. For this, Casper is shipped off to prison. It is later learned that he died ten days later.

Meanwhile, Corrie was sent to Scheveningen, a Dutch prison nicknamed '"Oranjehotel"', a hotel for people loyal to the House of Orange. She later learned that her sister is being held in another cell and that, aside from her father, all of her family members and friends have been released. A coded letter from Nollie reveals that the hidden Jews are safe. At Scheveningen, Corrie befriends a depressed Nazi officer. He arranges a brief meeting with her family under the pretense of reading Casper's will. Corrie is horrified to see how ill Willem is, as he contracted jaundice in prison and would later die in 1946. Corrie also learned that her nephew, Kik, was captured while he worked for the Dutch underground. He is later killed, but the family does not learn about his misfortune until 1953.

After four months at Scheveningen, Corrie and Betsie are transferred to Vught, a concentration camp for political prisoners in the Netherlands. Corrie is assigned to a factory that makes radios for aircraft. The work is not hard, and the prisoner-foreman, Mr. Moorman, is kind. Betsie, whose health is starting to fail, is sent to work sewing prison uniforms.

When a counteroffensive against the Nazis seems imminent, the prisoners are shipped by train to Germany, where they are imprisoned at Ravensbrück, a notorious women's concentration camp. The conditions there are hellish; both Corrie and Betsie are forced to perform backbreaking manual labour. It is at Ravensbruck that Betsie's health completely fails. Throughout the ordeal, Corrie is amazed at her sister's faith. In every camp, the sisters use a hidden Bible to teach their fellow prisoners about Jesus.

In Ravensbrück, where there is only hatred and misery, Corrie finds it hard to look to Heaven. Betsie, however, shows a universal love for everyone: not only the prisoners, but also their guards. Instead of feeling anger and hatred, Betsie pities the Germans and is sorrowful that they are blinded by their loathing. She yearns to show them the love of Christ, but dies before the war is over. Corrie is later released because of a clerical error, but she is forced to stay in a hospital barracks while she recovers from edema. Corrie arrives back in the Netherlands by January 1945.

After the armistice, Corrie works with persecuted victims as well as the Nazis themselves who were scarred by the war.

== Adaptations ==
In 1975 the book was made into a film of the same name starring Jeannette Clift (Corrie ten Boom), Julie Harris (Betsie ten Boom), and Arthur O'Connell (Casper ten Boom). It was remade as a film again in 2023.

Focus on the Family dramatized the story in 2007 for their Radio Theatre productions.

== Sources ==
- ten Boom, Corrie (1971). The Hiding Place. With John and Elizabeth Sherrill. Guideposts Associates. ISBN 0-912376-01-5.
