= Barteljorisstraat =

The Barteljorisstraat is a shopping street in Haarlem that connects the Grote Markt to the Kruisstraat.

== History ==
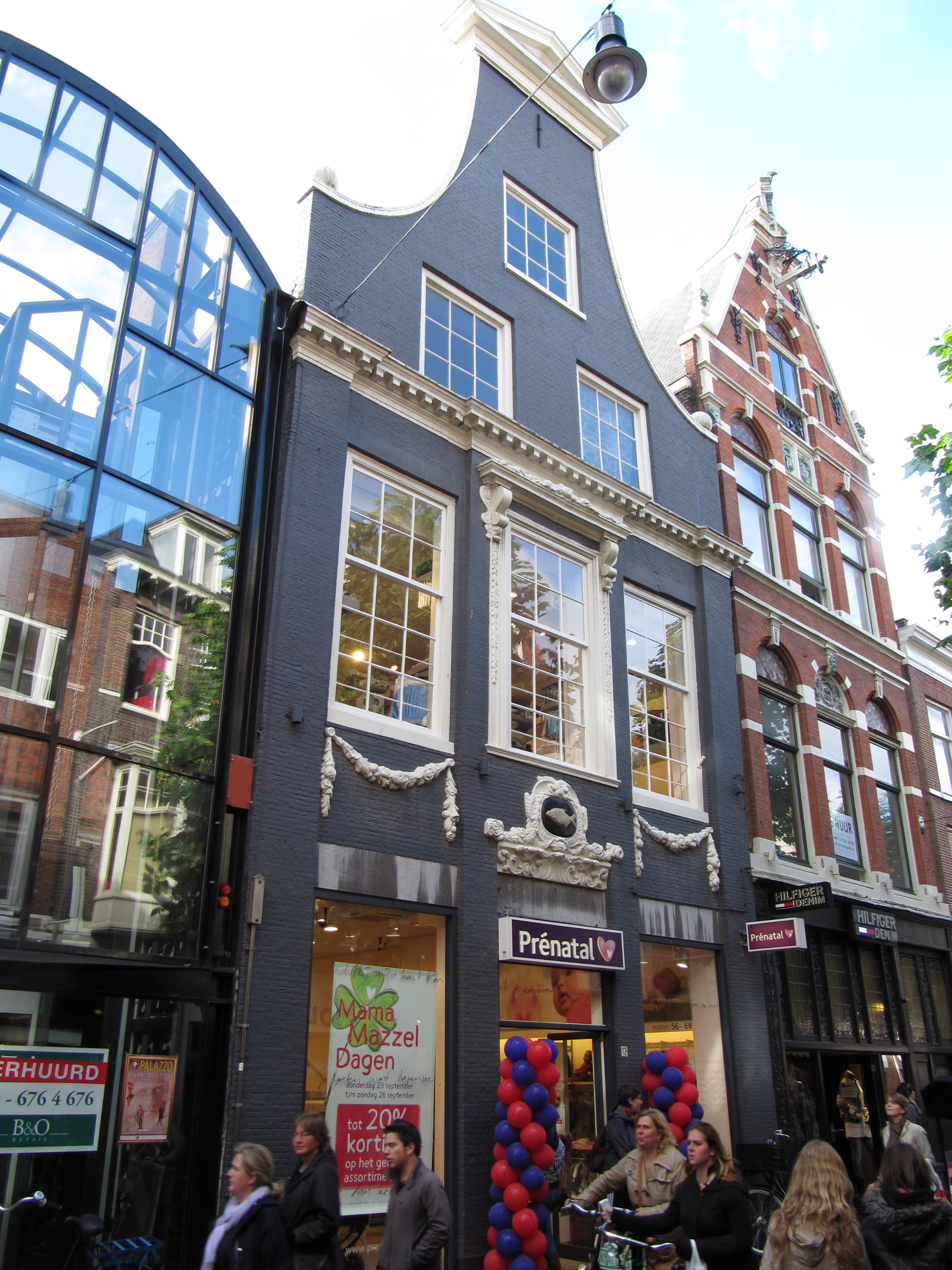
House built by Jacob van Campen

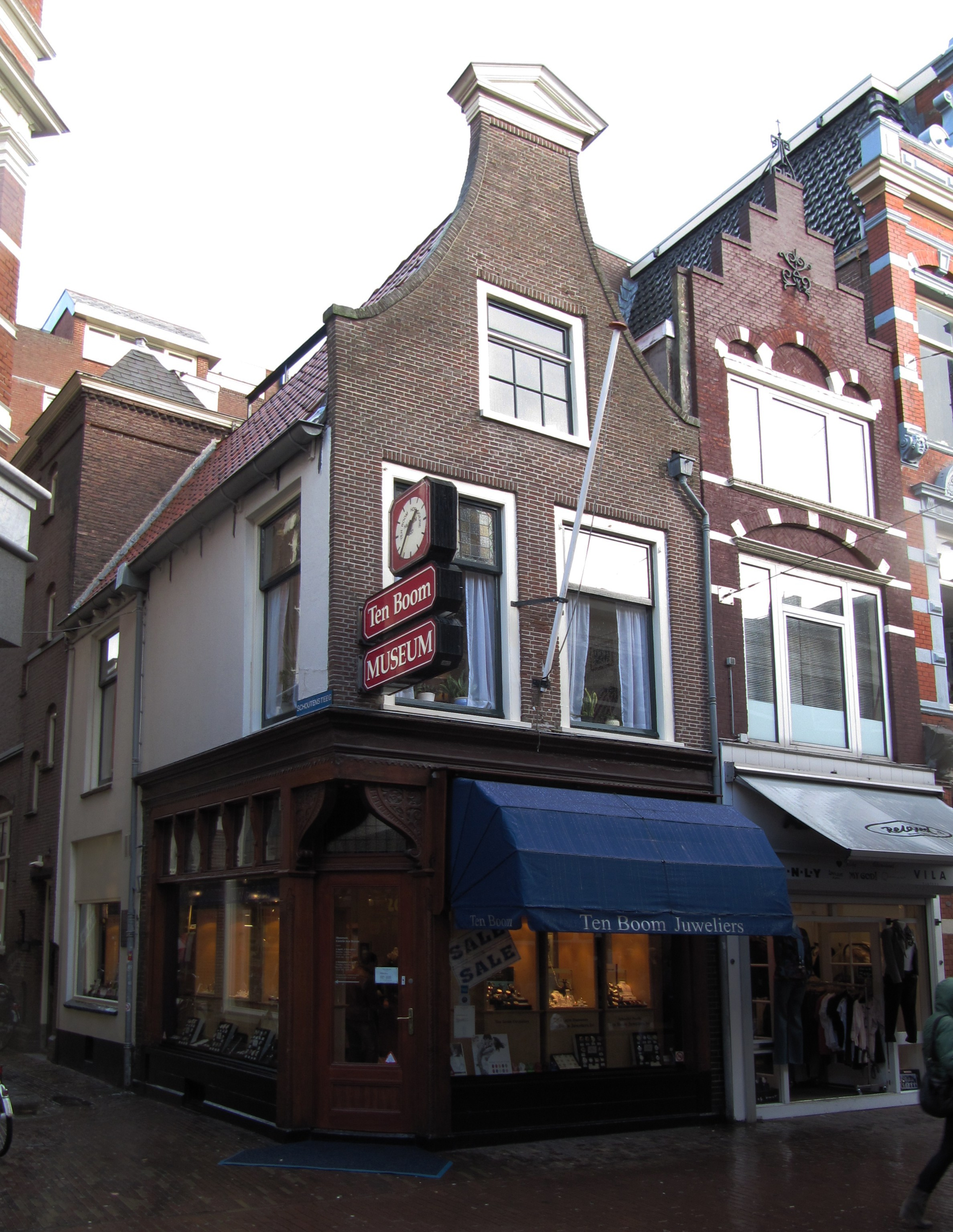
The Ten Boom Museum on the corner of the Schoutensteeg

The street is a main shopping street linking the Haarlem railway station to the Grote Markt. It form one of two old parallel routes running through the city on either side of the Grote Markt linking Heemstede to Schoten, and is one of the oldest atreets in Haarlem. It is mentioned in the book "The Hiding Place" by Corrie Ten Boom.

The streets in Haarlem were formally named and given signboards in 1876. At that time it was thought to be named after a certain "Bartel Jorisz", but the street was recorded in 14th and 15th century documents as "Batte Joris straat", which could be named after a woman named "Batte Jorisdr". In the 1827 Nautz map of Haarlem, the street is also called "Batte Joris straat". The street contains several rijksmonuments, including the Ten Boom Museum at number 19 dedicated to the memory of Corrie ten Boom and her family, who harbored Jews and other political refugees during World War II.

The Dutch version of Monopoly includes three Haarlem streets: Barteljorisstraat, Zijlweg and "Houtstraat" which refers to the Grote Houtstraat and the Kleine Houtstraat. All four of these streets are shopping streets today that convey pedestrians from the north, west and south to the Grote Markt. Halfway down the street is a small statue commemorating Malle Babbe by Kees Verkade.
