= BAFTA Award for Most Promising Newcomer to Leading Film Roles =

British film industry award

- Country: United Kingdom
- Presented by: British Academy of Film and Television Arts
- First award: 1952 (presented 1953)
- Final award: 1984 (presented 1985)
- Website: http://www.bafta.org/

The British Academy Award for Most Promising Newcomer to Leading Film Roles is a discontinued British Academy Film Award presented annually by the British Academy of Film and Television Arts (BAFTA) until 1984.

The category has had several name changes throughout its history, as detailed on the recipient's list below:

- 1952–1959: Most Promising Newcomer to Film
- 1960–1979: Most Promising Newcomer to Leading Film Roles
- 1980–1982: Most Outstanding Newcomer to Leading Film Roles
- 1983–1984: Most Outstanding Newcomer to Film

Note: The BAFTA site differs on what the category title is for the 1980s, with the actors own pages on the site using the titles given above, while other pages use Most Promising Newcomer to Film.

A similar award honoring new acting talent, the Rising Star Award, was introduced in 2006. Even though its nominees are selected by the BAFTA juries, the eventual Rising Star winner is decided by public votes via text, internet, or phone.

In the following lists, the titles and names in bold with a gold background are the winners and recipients respectively; those not in bold are the nominees. The years given are those in which the films under consideration were released, not the year of the ceremony, which always takes place the following year.

== Winners and nominees ==
indicates the winner

=== 1950s ===
Year	Actor	Film	Character
Most Promising Newcomer to Film
**1952** (6th)	**Claire Bloom**	**Limelight**	**Terry**
**1952** (6th)	Dorothy Alison	Mandy	Miss Stockston
**1952** (6th)	Mandy Miller	Mandy	Mandy Garland
**1952** (6th)	Dorothy Tutin	The Importance of Being Earnest	Cecily Cardew
**1953** (7th)	**Norman Wisdom**	**Trouble in Store**	**Norman**
**1953** (7th)	Colette Marchand	Moulin Rouge	Marie Charlet
**1954** (8th)	**David Kossoff**	**The Young Lovers**	**Geza Szobek**
**1954** (8th)	Maggie McNamara	The Moon is Blue	Patty O'Neill
**1954** (8th)	Eva Marie Saint	On the Waterfront	Edie Doyle
**1955** (9th)	**Paul Scofield**	**That Lady**	**King Philip II of Spain**
**1955** (9th)	Jo Van Fleet	East of Eden	Kate
**1956** (10th)	**Eli Wallach**	**Baby Doll**	**Silva Vaccara**
**1956** (10th)	Stephen Boyd	The Man Who Never Was	Patrick O'Reilly
**1956** (10th)	Don Murray	Bus Stop	Beauregard "Bo" Decker
**1956** (10th)	Susan Strasberg	Picnic	Millie Owens
**1956** (10th)	Elizabeth Wilson	Patterns of Power	Marge Fleming
**1957** (11th)	**Eric Barker**	**Brothers in Law**	**Alec Blair**
**1957** (11th)	Mylène Demongeot	The Witches of Salem	Abigail Williams
**1957** (11th)	Elvi Hale	True as a Turtle	Ann
**1957** (11th)	James MacArthur	The Young Stranger	Harold "Hal" Ditmar
**1957** (11th)	Keith Michell	True as a Turtle	Harry Bell
**1958** (12th)	**Paul Massie**	**Orders to Kill**	**Gene Summers**
**1958** (12th)	Red Buttons	Sayonara	Joe Kelly
**1958** (12th)	Teresa Iżewska	Kanał	Stokrotka
**1958** (12th)	Mary Peach	Room at the Top	June Samson
**1958** (12th)	Ronald Radd	The Camp on Blood Island	Commander Yamamitsu
**1958** (12th)	Maggie Smith	Nowhere to Go	Bridget Howard
**1958** (12th)	Gwen Verdon	What Lola Wants	Lola
**1959** (13th)	**Hayley Mills**	**Tiger Bay**	**Gillie Evans**
**1959** (13th)	Gerry Duggan	The Siege of Pinchgut	Pat Fulton
**1959** (13th)	Liz Fraser	I'm All Right Jack	Cynthia Kite
**1959** (13th)	Joseph N. Welch	Anatomy of a Murder	Judge Weaver

=== 1960s ===
Year	Actor	Film	Character
Most Promising Newcomer to Leading Film Roles
**1960** (14th)	**Albert Finney**	**Saturday Night and Sunday Morning**	**Arthur Seaton**
**1960** (14th)	Lelia Goldoni	Shadows	Lelia
**1960** (14th)	Jean-Pierre Léaud	The 400 Blows	Antoine Doinel
**1960** (14th)	George Peppard	Home from the Hill	Raphael "Rafe" Copley
**1960** (14th)	Joan Plowright	The Entertainer	Jean Rice
**1960** (14th)	Anthony Ray	Shadows	Tony
**1960** (14th)	Billie Whitelaw	Hell Is a City	Chloe Hawkins
**1961** (15th)	**Rita Tushingham**	**A Taste of Honey**	**Josephine "Jo"**
**1961** (15th)	Tony Hancock	The Rebel	Anthony Hancock
**1961** (15th)	Murray Melvin	A Taste of Honey	Geoffrey Ingham
**1962** (16th)	**Tom Courtenay**	**The Loneliness of the Long Distance Runner**	**Colin Smith**
**1962** (16th)	Mariette Hartley	Guns in the Afternoon	Elsa Knudsen
**1962** (16th)	Ian Hendry	Live Now, Pay Later	Albert
**1962** (16th)	Sarah Miles	Term of Trial	Shirley Taylor
**1962** (16th)	Terence Stamp	Billy Budd	Billy Budd
**1963** (17th)	**James Fox**	**The Servant**	**Tony**
**1963** (17th)	Wendy Craig	The Servant	Susan
**1963** (17th)	Keir Dullea	David and Lisa	David Clemens
**1963** (17th)	Janet Margolin	David and Lisa	Lisa Brandt
**1964** (18th)	**Julie Andrews**	**Mary Poppins**	**Mary Poppins**
**1964** (18th)	Elizabeth Ashley	The Carpetbaggers	Monica Winthrop
**1964** (18th)	The Beatles	A Hard Day's Night	The Beatles
**1964** (18th)	Lynn Redgrave	Girl with Green Eyes	Baba Brennan
**1965** (19th)	**Judi Dench**	**Four in the Morning**	**Wife**
**1965** (19th)	Michael Crawford	The Knack...and How to Get It	Colin
**1965** (19th)	Barbara Ferris	Catch Us If You Can	Dinah
**1965** (19th)	Tom Nardini	Cat Ballou	Jackson Two-Bears
**1966** (20th)	**Vivien Merchant**	**Alfie**	**Lily**
**1966** (20th)	Alan Arkin	The Russians Are Coming the Russians Are Coming	Lt. Yuri Rozanov
**1966** (20th)	Frank Finlay	Othello	Iago
**1966** (20th)	Jeremy Kemp	The Blue Max	Lt. Willi von Klugermann
**1967** (21st)	**Faye Dunaway ^{[A]}**	**Bonnie and Clyde**	**Bonnie Parker**
**1967** (21st)	**Faye Dunaway ^{[A]}**	**Hurry Sundown**	**Lou McDowell**
**1967** (21st)	Peter Kastner	You're A Big Boy Now	Bernard Chanticleer
**1967** (21st)	Milo O'Shea	Ulysses	Leopold Bloom
**1967** (21st)	Michael J. Pollard	Bonnie and Clyde	C.W Moss
**1968** (22nd)	**Dustin Hoffman**	**The Graduate**	**Benjamin Braddock**
**1968** (22nd)	Pia Degermark	Elvira Madigan	Hedvig Jensen "Elvira Madigan"
**1968** (22nd)	Katharine Ross	The Graduate	Elaine Robinson
**1968** (22nd)	Jack Wild	Oliver!	The Artful Dodger
**1969** (23rd)	**Jon Voight**	**Midnight Cowboy**	**Joe Buck**
**1969** (23rd)	Kim Darby	True Grit	Mattie Ross
**1969** (23rd)	Jennie Linden	Women in Love	Ursula Brangwen
**1969** (23rd)	Ali MacGraw	Goodbye, Columbus	Brenda Patimkin

=== 1970s ===
Year	Actor	Film	Character
**1970** (24th)	**David Bradley**	**Kes**	**Billy Casper**
**1970** (24th)	Liza Minnelli	Pookie	Mary Ann "Pookie" Adams
**1970** (24th)	Michael Sarrazin	They Shoot Horses, Don't They?	Robert Syverton
**1970** (24th)	Sally Thomsett	The Railway Children	Phyllis Waterbury
**1971** (25th)	**Dominic Guard**	**The Go-Between**	**Leo Colston**
**1971** (25th)	Gary Grimes	Summer of '42	Hermie
**1971** (25th)	Carrie Snodgress	Diary of a Mad Housewife	Tina Balser
**1971** (25th)	Janet Suzman	Nicholas and Alexandra	Alexandra
**1972** (26th)	**Joel Grey**	**Cabaret**	**Emcee**
**1972** (26th)	Bud Cort	Harold and Maude	Harold Parker Chason
**1972** (26th)	Al Pacino	The Godfather	Michael Corleone
**1972** (26th)	Simon Ward	Young Winston	Winston Churchill
**1973** (27th)	**Peter Egan**	**The Hireling**	**Captain Hugh Cantrip**
**1973** (27th)	Jim Dale	Adolf Hitler: My Part in his Downfall	Terence "Spike" Milligan
**1973** (27th)	David Essex	That'll Be the Day	Jim MacLain
**1973** (27th)	Kris Kristofferson	Pat Garrett and Billy the Kid	Billy the Kid
**1974** (28th)	**Georgina Hale**	**Mahler**	**Alma Werfel**
**1974** (28th)	Cleavon Little	Blazing Saddles	Sheriff Bart
**1974** (28th)	Sissy Spacek	Badlands	Holly Sargis
**1975** (29th)	**Valerie Perrine**	**Lenny**	**Honey Bruce**
**1975** (29th)	Robert De Niro	The Godfather Part II	Vito Corleone
**1975** (29th)	Alfred Lutter	Alice Doesn't Live Here Anymore	Tommy
**1975** (29th)	Lily Tomlin	Nashville	Linnea Reese
**1976** (30th)	**Jodie Foster ^{[A]}**	**Bugsy Malone**	**Tallulah**
**1976** (30th)	**Jodie Foster ^{[A]}**	**Taxi Driver**	**Iris Steensma**
**1976** (30th)	No nominees were recognized		
**1977** (31st)	**Isabelle Huppert**	**The Lacemaker**	**Pomme**
**1977** (31st)	Olimpia Carlisi	The Middle of the World	Adriana
**1977** (31st)	Jeannette Clift	The Hiding Place	Corrie ten Boom
**1977** (31st)	Saverio Marconi	Padre Padrone	Gavino
**1978** (32nd)	**Christopher Reeve**	**Superman**	**Clark Kent / Superman**
**1978** (32nd)	Brad Davis	Midnight Express	Billy Hayes
**1978** (32nd)	Mary Beth Hurt	Interiors	Joey
**1978** (32nd)	Melanie Mayron	Girlfriends	Susan Weinblatt
**1979** (33rd)	**Dennis Christopher**	**Breaking Away**	**Dave Stoller**
**1979** (33rd)	Gary Busey	The Buddy Holly Story	Buddy Holly
**1979** (33rd)	Sigourney Weaver	Alien	Ellen Ripley
**1979** (33rd)	Ray Winstone	That Summer!	Steve Brody

=== 1980s ===
Year	Actor	Film	Character
Most Outstanding Newcomer to Leading Film Roles
**1980** (34th)	**Judy Davis**	**My Brilliant Career**	**Sybylla Melvyn**
**1980** (34th)	Sônia Braga	Dona Flor and Her Two Husbands	Flor
**1980** (34th)	John Gordon Sinclair	Gregory's Girl	Gregory Underwood
**1980** (34th)	Debra Winger	Urban Cowboy	Sissy Davis
**1981** (35th)	**Joe Pesci**	**Raging Bull**	**Joey LaMotta**
**1981** (35th)	Klaus Maria Brandauer	Mephisto	Hendrik Hoefgen
**1981** (35th)	Timothy Hutton	Ordinary People	Conrad Jarrett
**1981** (35th)	Cathy Moriarty	Raging Bull	Vicki Thailer
**1982** (36th)	**Ben Kingsley**	**Gandhi**	**Mahatma Gandhi**
**1982** (36th)	Drew Barrymore	E.T. the Extra-Terrestrial	Gertie
**1982** (36th)	Henry Thomas	E.T. the Extra-Terrestrial	Elliott
**1982** (36th)	Kathleen Turner	Body Heat	Matty Walker
Most Outstanding Newcomer to Film
**1983** (37th)	**Phyllis Logan**	**Another Time, Another Place**	**Janie**
**1983** (37th)	Kevin Kline	Sophie's Choice	Nathan Landau
**1983** (37th)	Greta Scacchi	Heat and Dust	Olivia Rivers
**1983** (37th)	Julie Walters	Educating Rita	Susan "Rita" White
**1984** (38th)	**Haing S. Ngor**	**The Killing Fields**	**Pran**
**1984** (38th)	Rupert Everett	Another Country	Guy Bennett
**1984** (38th)	John Lynch	Cal	Cal
**1984** (38th)	Tim Roth	The Hit	Myron

== Notes ==
A^{1} ^{2} : Rules from the 1960s to the 1970s allowed for a performer to receive a single citation which could honor their work in more than one film. Faye Dunaway and Jodie Foster were both nominated for their roles in two different films in the same category.
