= Girl Singing (Hals) =

Painting by Frans Hals

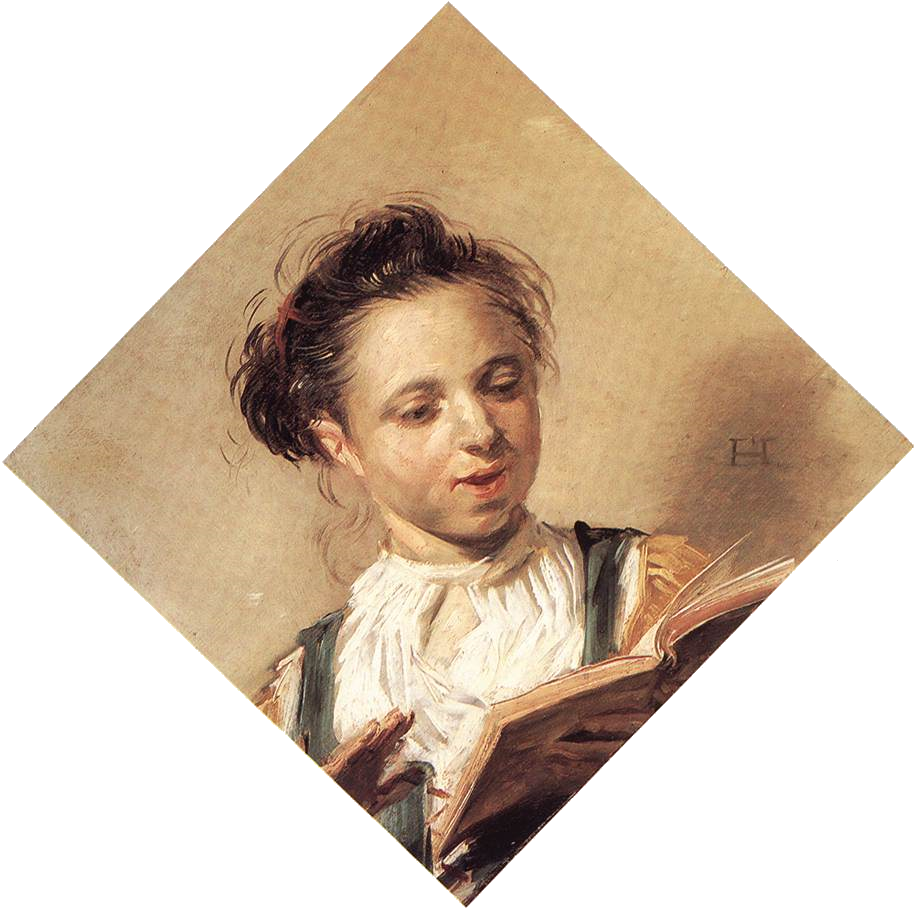
- Artist: Frans Hals
- Year: About 1628
- Medium: Oil on panel
- Subject: Head and shoulders of a young woman singing from a book
- Dimensions: Lozenge with sides of about 18.5 cm × 18.5 cm (7½ in × 7½ in)
- Owner: Frans Hals Museum (Haarlem) and Mauritshuis (The Hague) (shared)
- Accession: os 2025-16 at Haarlem; 1231 at The Hague

Girl Singing is a figurative painting by Frans Hals, who was a male 17th-century Dutch master. Its subject is a girl or young woman singing. More particularly, it is her expressive face as she focuses intently on singing from her music book, and the apparent spontaneity of the moment in which the artist 'captures' her. Girl Singing is one of a pair of pictures Hals painted at Haarlem in about 1628; its pendant is the Boy Playing the Violin. Both paintings have a musical theme. Both show casually dressed young people, presumably at home. They are the same quite small size and each is in square lozenge format, in oil colours on a wooden panel. It has been suggested the models were two of Hals's own children.

== Description ==
Seymour Slive remarked that Girl Singing exhibits the same sparkling technique and blond tonality seen in the commissioned portraits on the same small scale that Hals painted in the second half of the 1620s.

Girl Singing depicts the head, part of the upper body, and hands of a girl or young woman singing from a book. As is the case in most of Hals's work, the light falls from the subject's right (our left). To the right, in an otherwise plain background in warm shades of light brown, is a patch of shade (the young woman's shadow) in which Hals has put his usual FH monogram signature. The painting is not dated; the conjectured date of "about 1628" relies on comparison with other works by Hals.

The lines of the Girl's brow, mouth, shoulders, finger tips, and the page from which she sings almost rhyme with two sides of the painting's lozenge shape; her nose and her one visible ear nearly (but not quite) echo the other two sides—all of which brings unity to the painting's composition while supporting the impression that the subject is in motion within its compositional frame.

The Girl's face is depicted as cheerful, animated, and open. Her lips part as she sings. She is concentrating on the music in her book and absorbed in her singing. She keeps rhythm with her right hand. She turns her face a little to her left and down towards her book, which she holds in her left hand at the lower right-hand edge of the painting. Because the artist looks up from a position slightly lower than the youngster's face, we can see her eyes. The page she is singing from flitters above the other pages. It does not lie flat. The artist's low viewpoint together with the girl's turning gesture and downward look focus the viewer’s attention on the relationship between her and her music.

Overall, Hals's painting convincingly evokes a young person's energy and joy in a passing moment.

The girl or young woman in Girl Singing wears no lace, embroidery, or other finery to signal elevated social class. That would have suggested she was dressed up to have her portrait painted, compromising the intended illusion of spontaneity. (Compare, for example, the seven daughters in Hals's group portrait of Gijsbert Claeszoon van Campen's family, who are all dressed to the nines.)

Discussing the artist's several pictures of young singers, Ernst Wilhelm Moes commented that Hals does not just paint 'figures singing': the natural play of their facial expression shows us that his youngsters really are singing to us—and we can all but hear their voices.

The Catholic Herald discerns something in the countenance of the Girl Singing that could have been angelic, had she not been painted for a Protestant market. Studio International imagines Girl Singing as a panel in an altar.

Girl Singing is a cabinet picture in the sense that it was painted small enough (about 26.5 x 26.5 cm or 10½ x 10½ inches from side to side or top to bottom, without frame) to hang in an ordinary Dutch home. It is (unusually for Hals) square (each side is about 18.5 cm or 7½ inches) and (also unusually for Hals) in lozenge format (that is to say, it hangs as if from one of its corners). The panel on which Girl Singing is painted is bookmatched with the Boy Playing the Violin's panel: in the case of Girl Singing the grain can be seen to slope from the lower left-hand side of the painting towards the upper right, mirroring the grain in Boy Playing the Violin (which is the same size and shape). The panels are probably Baltic oak. Girl Singing is quite tightly cropped. Both paintings are currently (2025) in elaborate perpendicular tortoise-shell frames — "delightful carapace" in "uncompromising good taste".

The panels on which Girl Singing and Boy Playing the Violin are painted are both cradled at the back.

== Clothes and hair: social conventions ==
The young woman is dressed casually in an everyday green bodice over a white linen chemise, reminiscent of Hals's similarly attired, similarly posed, lusty Bohémienne (known in the past as "The Gypsy Girl"), which is also from about 1628. (For these reasons, the Girl Singing and La Bohémienne have adjacent entries in Cornelis Hofstede de Groot's 1910 Catalogue Raisonné of the Works of the Most Eminent Dutch Painters of the Seventeenth Century.)

The conventions applying to girls' and women's clothes, hairstyles, and headwear were stern in the Dutch Republic in Hals's time—and particularly so in Haarlem, where Mennonite and Reformed influences were strong. A low neckline, unbound hair, or even too skimpy headwear might attract a chiding or worse. (In this context, Isabella Coymans' fashionable marriage-portrait attire would have been seen as forward in Haarlem.)

The art market also expected strict propriety. For instance, the model for Hals's Smiling Fishergirl wears a chemise closed tight up to the throat and a big black bonnet concealing nearly all her hair. This contrasts with the model for Girl Singing, who is bare-headed. The Girl Singing model has her hair tied back loosely in what the early 21st century would call a 'low messy bun'. It seems on the point of coming undone, with strands spilling out in almost every direction. Her chemise comes apart a little at the placket below her collar. That was not the fashion of the time in Haarlem, nor are her loose hair and loose chemise wiles to attract attention—she is just busy singing. But they suggest an enthusiastic singer in action, and they may suggest a domestic, rather than a public, setting: in 1628 a respectable young woman might have preferred not to be seen out and about in Haarlem in such disarray.

== Titles and models ==
Hals did not give his paintings titles. The names by which we now know them do not always identify them uniquely, nor do all authors necessarily use the same name for a particular painting. Hofstede de Groot's Catalogue Raisonné lists Girl Singing as "A Girl Singing from a Book". Slive has it as "Singing Girl".

There are reasons to think the models for Girl Singing and Boy Playing the Violin were two of Frans Hals's own children: He had many children, and a Haarlem resident who claimed to have known most of them told Arnold Houbraken they were all keen musicians. Moreover, Hals seldom painted square pictures—but "two square likenesses [specifically conterfeytsels in the original Dutch] of the children of Hals done in Haarlem by [Hals himself]" are recorded in a 1644 inventory. Jaap van der Veen suggests they may well have been the Girl Singing and the Boy Playing the Violin. It has been conjectured that the artist's daughter Sara Hals (baptised 21 February 1617) could have been the model for Girl Singing. If the picture was indeed painted in about 1628, she would have been some 10 or 11 years old at the time. Sara was to prove something of a handfull to manage: after she had twice given birth to a child out of wedlock, her parents had her committed to the same "dolhuys" (a workhouse doubling as an asylum) at which Malle Babbe was an inmate.

The Dutch language of Hals's time conventionally distinguished various categories of painting that featured people. For example, there were commissioned group portraits of "regents", that is: governors of charitable institutions, volunteer officers of city guards, and the like. There were also individual likenesses or portraits (conterfeytsels in the Dutch of the 17th century), which showed a specific person (or sometimes a couple or family) and were typically painted to order for a paying client. Unless Hals meant it to be kept in the family (which we do not know), we could think of the Girl Singing as more like a tronie, the term for another category, in which the subject is an expressive, characteristic, or funny generic face (so, not an individual person). Tronies and other genre paintings were intended to be offered on the open art market. A tronie is thus distinct from a likeness (or portrait) in the Dutch analysis and terminology of the time. If money changed hands between the artist and the sitter for a tronie, it was the artist who paid the model. Normally, we cannot tell who the individuals were who modelled for tronies. Often we can put names to the relatively wealthy people who sat, and paid, for portraits by Hals. Hals's work includes several examples in each of these three categories (and others).

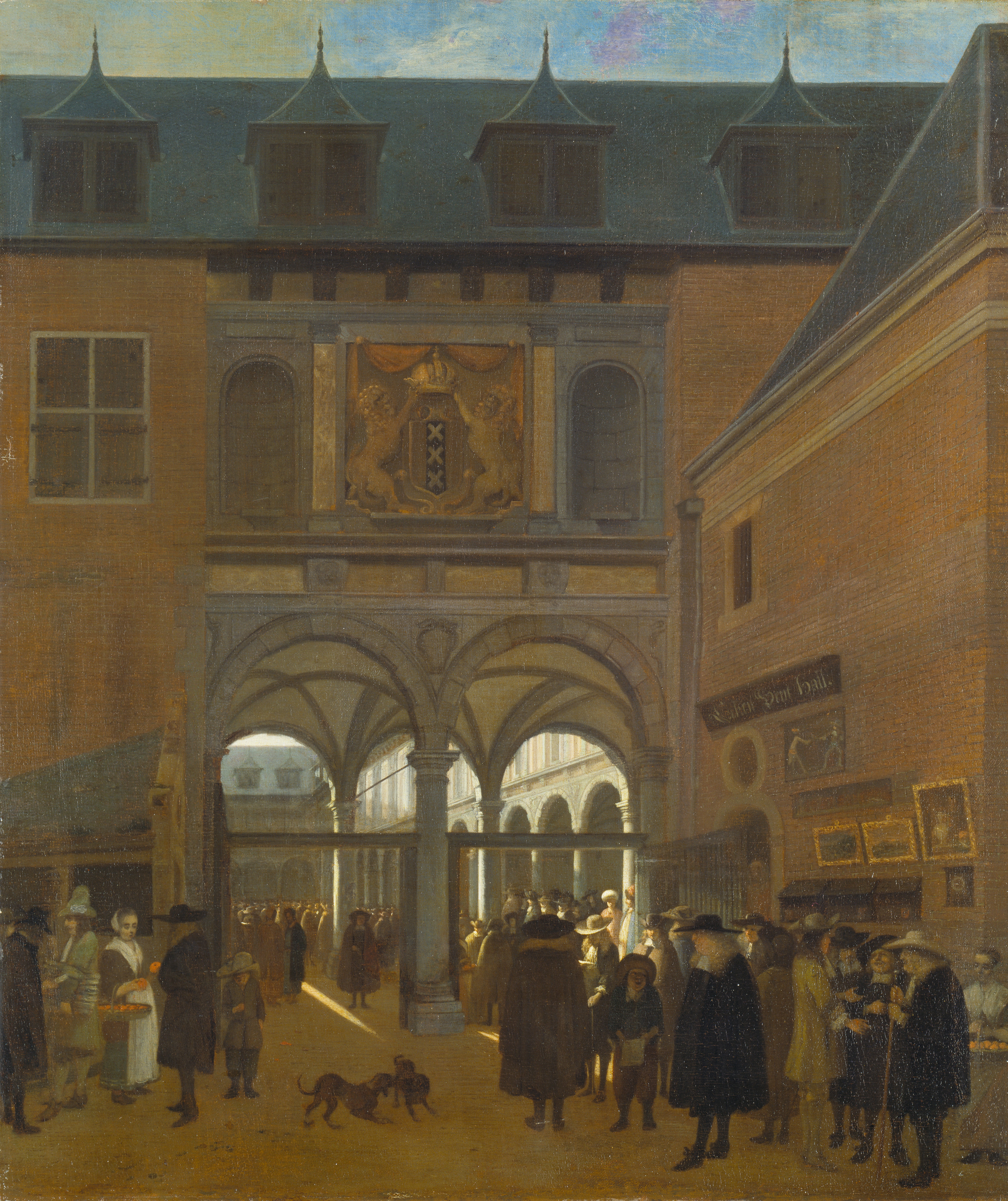
The open art market: In the 17th century, there was little call for religious art to hang in Protestant Dutch churches, but ordinary townspeople in the Dutch Republic would buy paintings (such as tronies and genre works) to hang at home. Open-market channels for art included lotteries and Dutch auctions as well as retail sales. On the right-hand side of this 1670s painting by Job Berckheyde (at the Städel, Frankfurt) we can see the stall of an art retailer outside the Amsterdam stock exchange.

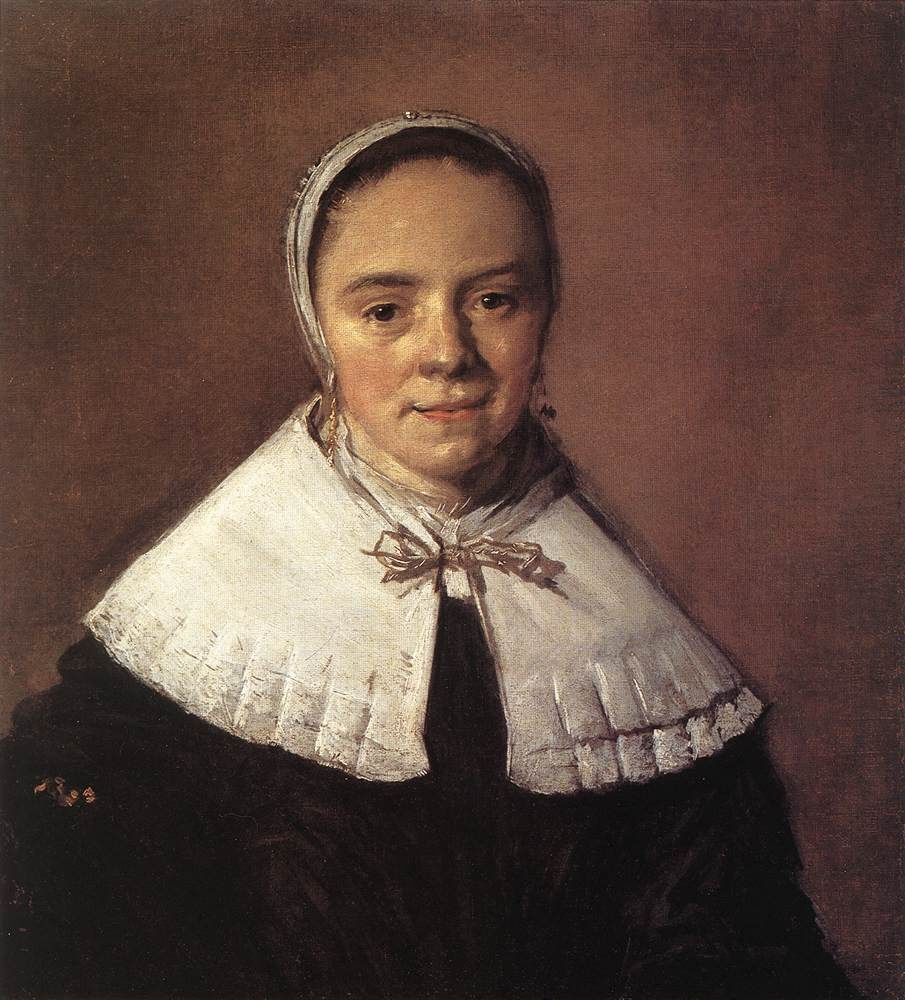
Hals's Portrait of a Young Woman (about 1658) at the Ferens in Hull—might be a tronie or an unconventional portrait for which the identity of the sitter is no longer known.

== Style and technique ==
Painter and art theoretician Karel van Mander, the master under whom Hals learnt his trade, taught a distinction between the rough ('rouw') and the smooth or neat ('net') styles of painting. He advised apprentices and beginners to learn to paint in the smooth style before attempting the rough, because the rough is more difficult. Striking aspects of the smooth style are the painstaking attention to every detail and the absence of visible brushwork. A subject painted in the smooth style will look relatively static (or composed, or tranquil). Intended motion is likely to look frozen. A gifted exponent of the smooth style was Hals's apprentice Johannes Corneliszoon Verspronck, who later competed with Hals for portrait commissions in Haarlem. Clients chose Verspronck if they sought a detailed, carefully posed and controlled smooth portrait like his Portrait of a Lady, illustrated elsewhere in the present article.

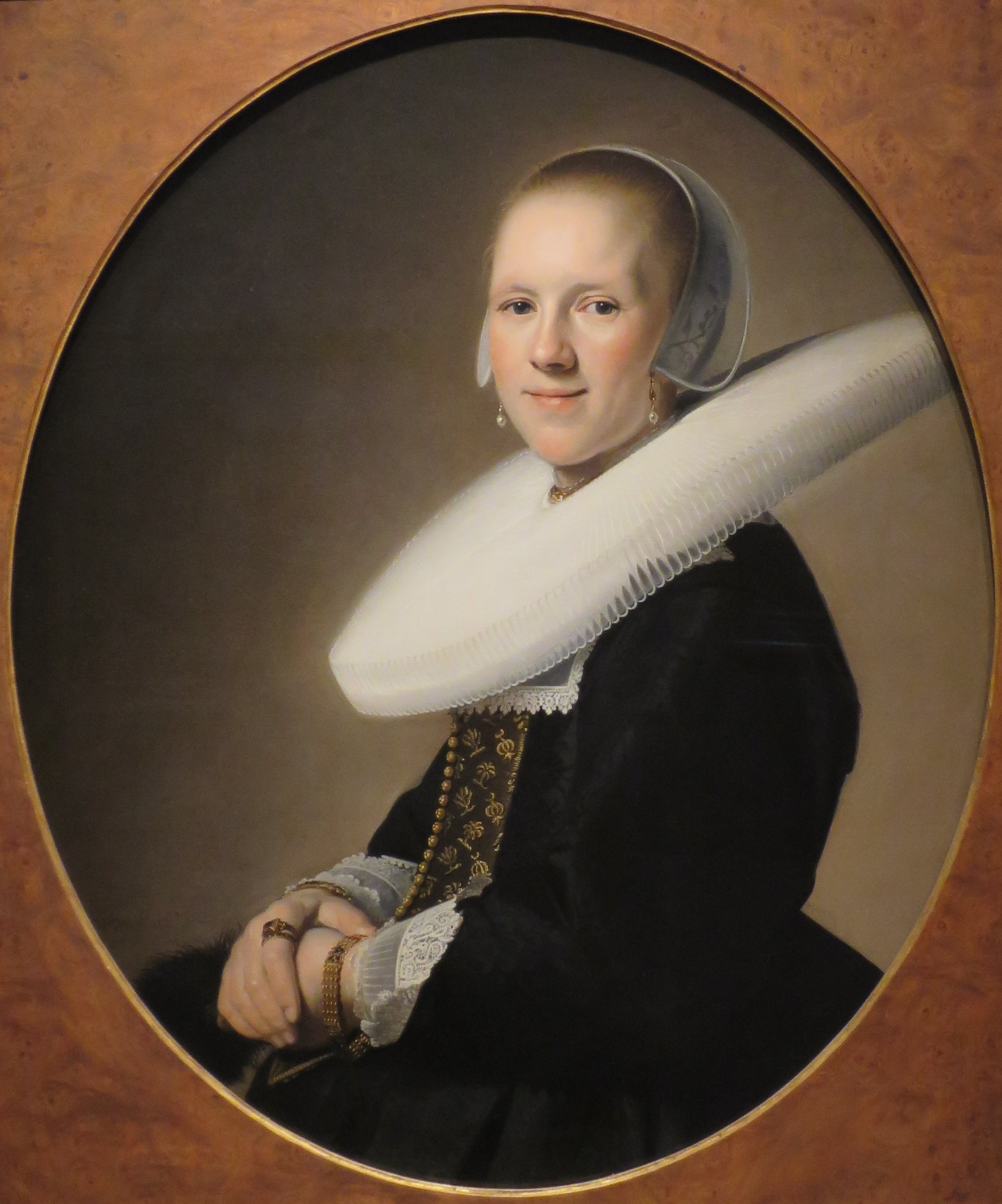
The smooth style in a conventional formal portrait: Verspronck's Portrait of a Lady (1641; Norton Simon Museum, Pasadena, California)

However, Bart Cornelis has commented: "I'm not sure Hals was interested in people sitting still; he wanted to capture what they were like when they were talking, drinking, or smiling."

Hals's aim for his Girl Singing was clearly not detail, or composure, or tranquillity. "Hals did not dash off painted sketches, but he encouraged viewers to think [so]" (Christopher D. M. Atkins). The 'dashed-off' look of Girl Singing chimes with the seeming spontaneity of the scene it depicts.

No preparatory drawing is known for Girl Singing, but we know Hals did employ a multi-stage process to help create an illusion of spontaneity. He generally painted layer over slowly dried layer, like other artists of his time working in oils, and he addressed the hands and facial details in his last (top) layers. Hals constructed the face of the Girl Singing from broad patches of colour and then made it 'vibrate' in the light with the short parallel strokes visible, for example, in the young woman's forehead. Observers from his own time, as well as more recent technical examinations of his work, tell us Hals 'added' liveliness to his subjects at the end of his process. Energetic finishing flourishes, including facial highlights and the like, might be added wet-in-wet. According to Houbraken, Hals called such added liveliness "het kennelyke van den meester"—the master's distinctive touch.

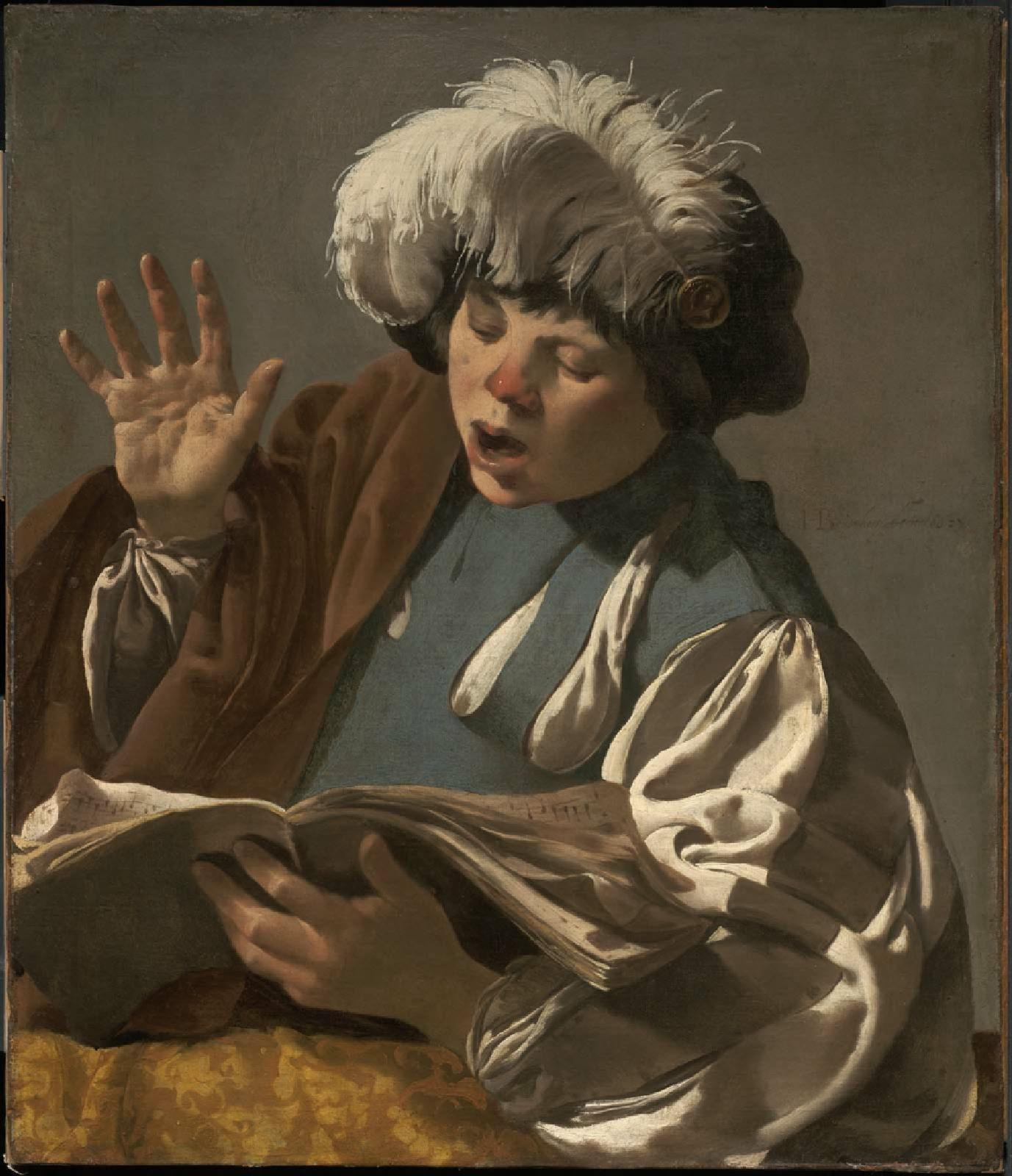
For comparison: Hendrick ter Brugghen's Boy Singing (1627; Museum of Fine Arts, Boston, Massachusetts)

Instructive comparison can be drawn between Girl Singing and a nearly contemporary work, Boy Singing (1627) by Hendrick ter Brugghen. Ter Brugghen was an Utrecht Caravaggist who used deep shade and bright highlights ('chiaroscuro') to model the physical depth of his subject. He left little visible trace of brushwork on the surface of his painting. The Ter Brugghen singer's gestures are similar to, but more pronounced (and more dramatic) than, the 'busy-ness' of Hals's Girl Singing. Nonetheless, the singer in the Ter Brugghen painting appears posed and static alongside the active young woman pictured in the Hals work.

As reported by Houbraken, Anthony van Dyck rather condescendingly judged that if only he had blended his colours a little more delicately or thinly, Hals "could have been" one of the greatest masters. However, as Bart Cornelis contends, "Hals's brush can turn a portrait into a palpable presence." In painting, movement (activity, vitality) can be imparted through imprecision and with "springy" brushstrokes—and these effects are evident in the emphatically unblended, non-delicate brushwork of Hals's Girl Singing. The up-and-down movement of the young woman's right hand as she beats the rhythm of her song is captured in Hals's flickeringly indistinct handling of her fingers. The roll of her upper body comes across in the jagged, unfinished outline of her shoulders and especially in the shifting pleats of her chemise, which are executed as broad, angular, unblended brushstrokes. And above all, the bouncy strands of her unruly hair double as 'motion lines' anticipating the draughtsmanship of comics artists more than three centuries later. Joshua Reynolds, who admired Hals's work, noted that imprecision can actually enhance the "likeness" of a portrait, which "consists more in preserving the general effect of the countenance than in the most minute finishing of the features or any of the particular parts". The viewer's imagination, Reynolds added, fills in the details more satisfactorily than could an artist, however careful.

== Hals's art and artifice ==
Only Rembrandt and Hals place such unembarrassed emphasis on the artifice of their art, a break with tradition that would not be taken up again until the 19th century. Yet all these whorls and scratches inevitably resolve into Haarlemmers who, though centuries dead, illustrate the paradox that makes Hals's work so fascinating: Blatantly artificial, yet so alive that his subjects always seem to have been snapped in flagrante as if by a canny street photographer. Roman Vishniac's Warsaw, Vivian Maier's Chicago, Henri Cartier-Bresson's Paris: all descend from Frans Hals's Haarlem.

— Benjamin Moser

== Location, owners, exhibitions, and authenticity ==
Since May 2025, Girl Singing and Boy Playing the Violin have been in the shared possession of the Frans Hals Museum (Haarlem) and the Mauritshuis (The Hague), which intend to take turns in showing them together as a pair. Before that, they were in the collection of Jordan Saunders and the late Thomas A. Saunders III.

Girl Singing had always been in private ownership and changed hands several times. Often its whereabouts was not known to the public. At the time Hofstede de Groot compiled his 1910 Catalogue Raisonné of the Dutch masters, it was owned by American railway financier Charles T. Yerkes, who developed what would become the Bakerloo and Piccadilly lines of the London Underground.

Girl Singing was not included in the 1962 centenary exhibition at the Frans Hals Museum. In 1989–1990 the painting was shown at the National Gallery of Art Frans Hals exhibition in Washington, D.C., the Royal Academy, London, and the Frans Hals Museum. From March 2023 to January 2025 Girl Singing was on loan to the Virginia Museum of Fine Arts ("VMFA"), where it could be seen in an exhibition titled Elegance and Wonder: Masterpieces of European Art from the Jordan and Thomas A. Saunders III Collection. While it was on loan to the VMFA it travelled to London (the National Gallery) and Amsterdam (the Rijksmuseum) for Frans Hals exhibitions (2023–2024) but not to Berlin (Gemäldegalerie) for a similar 2024 exhibition there, Frans Hals—Meister des Augenblicks.

Claus Grimm did not include Girl Singing in his 1989 catalogue of Hals's complete works (Das Gesamtwerk). Based on his detailed analysis of the painting's execution, Grimm subsequently assigned it to Hals's workshop, possibly Judith Leyster, with later corrections by Frans Hals.

Otherwise it has generally been regarded by the reliable writers and by the curators as an authentic Frans Hals work, and attributed accordingly in the catalogues. For example, Girl Singing is no. 118 in Hofstede de Groot's Catalogue Raisonné and is also included with an illustration at p. 68 in Wilhelm Valentiner's exhaustive 1923 catalogue of Hals's paintings. In Frans Dony's 1976 catalogue of Hals's works it is no. F312. It is no. 25 in Seymour Slive's catalogue for the 1990 Hals exhibition at the Royal Academy, London.

(Scroll down to the external links for detailed provenance, exhibition, and literature lists.)
