= The Gypsy Girl (Hals) =

1628 painting by Frans Hals

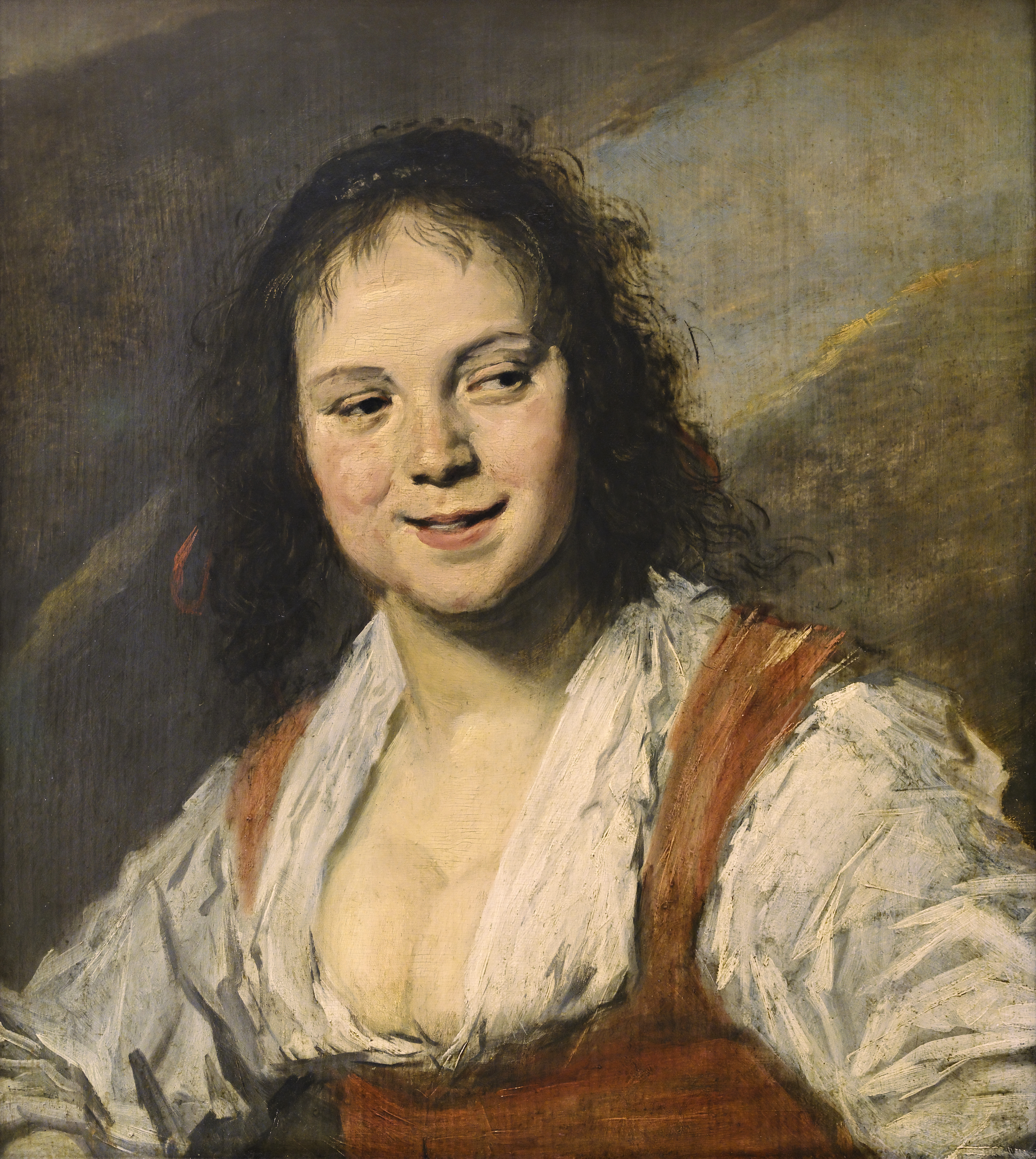
- The Gypsy Girl, c.1628 Oil on wood, 57.8 x 52.1 cm
- Artist: Frans Hals
- Year: 1628–1630
- Catalogue: Seymour Slive, Catalog 1974: #62
- Medium: Oil on wood
- Dimensions: 57.8 cm × 52.1 cm (22.8 in × 20.5 in)
- Location: Louvre Museum; Paris
- Accession: M.I. 926

The Gypsy Girl, also known as Gypsy Girl or Young Woman (La Bohémienne) (and sometimes erroneously referred to as Malle Babbe) is an oil-on-wood painting by the Dutch Golden Age painter Frans Hals, painted in 1628–1630, and now in the Louvre Museum, in Paris. It is a tronie, a study of facial expression and unusual costume, rather than a commissioned portrait.

The display of cleavage was not a common feature of costume seen in public in Hals' time and place. For this reason various art historians have assumed a painting of a prostitute was intended. From the 19th century the Louvre titled the painting La Bohémienne, meaning a female gypsy, but there is no reason to assume the model was Romani.

== Painting ==
This painting was cataloged by Hofstede de Groot in 1910, who wrote "119. THE GYPSY GIRL. B. 41; M. 263 – Half-length; life-size. A laughing gypsy girl, seen almost in full face, looks down towards the right. Her brown hair falls on her shoulders. She wears a red bodice over a white chemise which exposes her breast. Yellow flesh-tones. A superb picture."

Hofstede de Groot noticed that the dress of the sitter in this painting is similar to two other paintings by Hals, and he included them on either side of this one (catalog numbers 118 and 120). This painting was first documented in a Paris sale in 1782 and every Frans Hals catalog after that includes her. In the exhibition catalog for the 1962 show, this painting's entry at #23 states that in a raking light one can see that diagonal strokes were once painted on either side of her breasts, indicating that Hals first made her décolleté less daring. Since Hals usually painted his genre works wet-on-wet in one go, such evidence of discovery while working is perhaps evidence of a certain reservation on Hals's part to make a portrait of a wanton woman, though in his time it was a common subject.

== Song ==
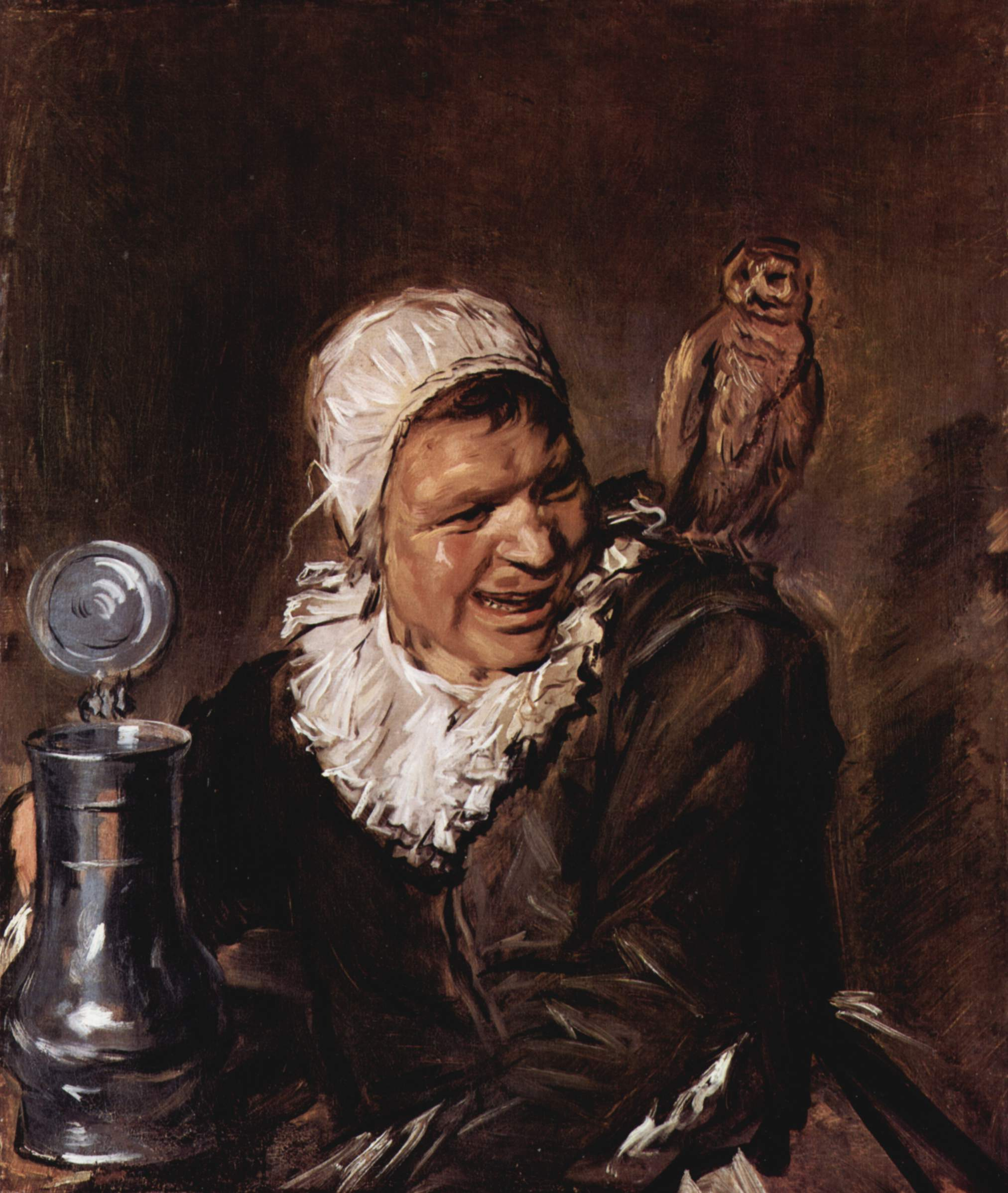
Malle Babbe, c. 1633/35. Oil on canvas, 75 x 64 cm, Berlin

The Gypsy Girl was lent out for the 1962 Frans Hals exhibition in the Frans Hals Museum, where she inspired the Haarlem singer-songwriter Lennaert Nijgh to write a song about her which he called Malle Babbe, mistakenly named after another painting in the same exhibition. The song celebrates the girl's lusty, vibrant sexuality. The raunchy song became a Dutch hit for Rob de Nijs in 1975 and is still popular in versions by different artists. Today the painting is also sometimes referred to as Malle Babbe for this reason.

Girls painted by Hals who are wearing similar chemises:

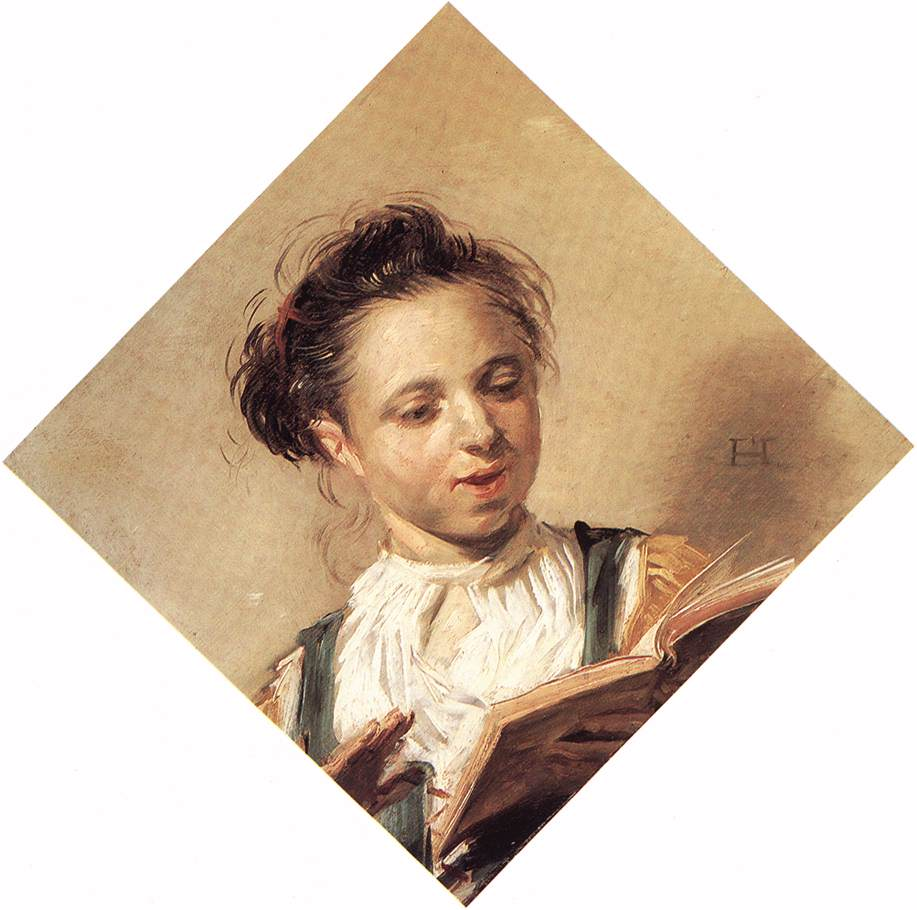
HdG cat. nr. 118: Girl Singing, with a buttoned-up chemise under a green tunic

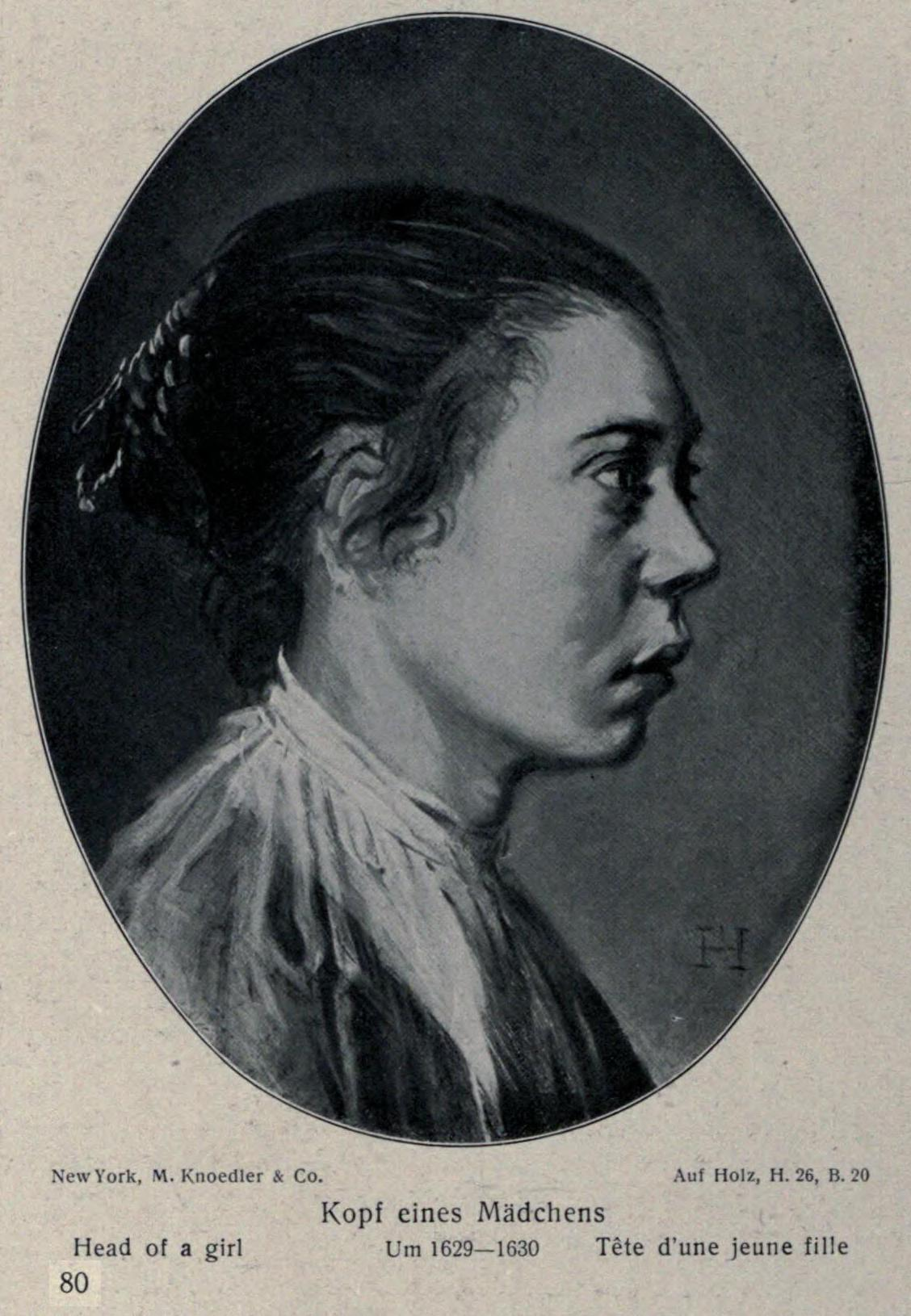
HdG cat. nr. 120: Portrait of a girl facing right, with a delicate transparent chemise worn over a darker under garment.

== See also ==
- List of paintings by Frans Hals
