= Ten Boom Museum =

Museum in Haarlem, the Netherlands

Coordinates: 52.3823°N 4.6354°E

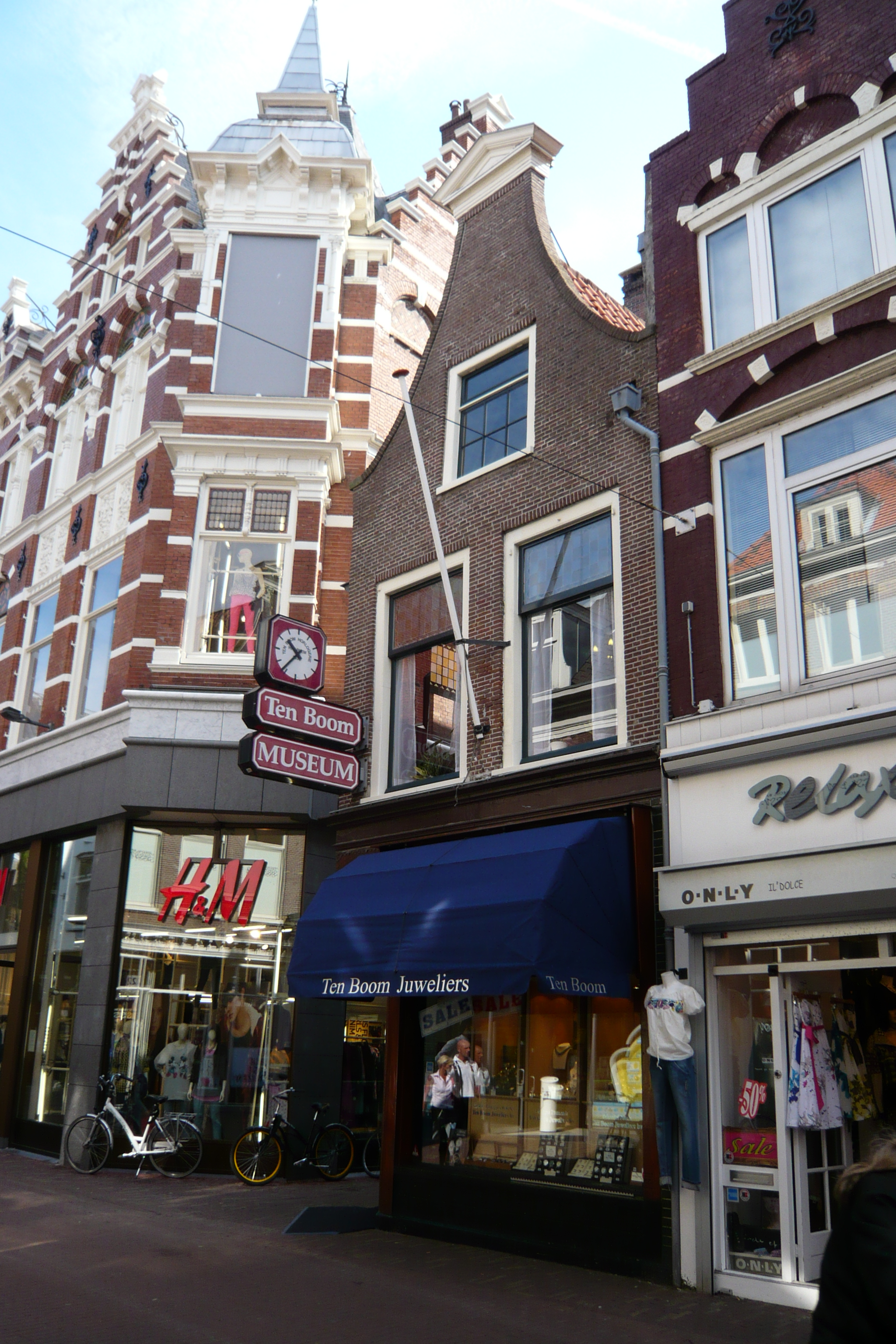
Ten Boom Museum on the Barteljorisstraat in Haarlem. It is a 17th-century house with a neck gable facade.

The Ten Boom Museum is a museum in Haarlem, the Netherlands, dedicated to The Hiding Place, the subject of a book by Corrie ten Boom. The house where the museum is located was purchased and restored in 1983 by the Corrie ten Boom Fellowship, a non-profit 501(c)(3) corporation governed by a board of directors. Mike Evans serves as the chairman of the Board.

The Ten Boom family ran a watch shop (horlogerie) on the corner of an alleyway and the main shopping street of Haarlem, the Netherlands. During the Nazi occupation of Haarlem starting in 1942, they provided safe harbour for Jews and other underground refugees in a hiding place they built upstairs. Their large social network in church charities and watchmaker circles made the family quite successful in smuggling refugees until it was betrayed on February 28, 1944. In the alleyway, it would place a small triangular sign to indicate that the coast was clear. After the betrayal, the Nazis were able to collect many more prisoners by falsely placing the triangle in the window.

Casper ten Boom, the father, died on March 9, 1944, less than two weeks later, in Scheveningen prison, at 84. Betsie ten Boom died on December 16 in Ravensbrück concentration camp, at 59. Willem died on December 16, 1946, in Hilversum, at 60. His son Christiaan ("Kik") died sometime in April 1945, at 25. Corrie ten Boom survived Ravensbrück and returned to Haarlem and the watch shop. She died in 1983, on her 91st birthday. She wrote several books about her experiences, and this museum opened on her birthday in 1988.

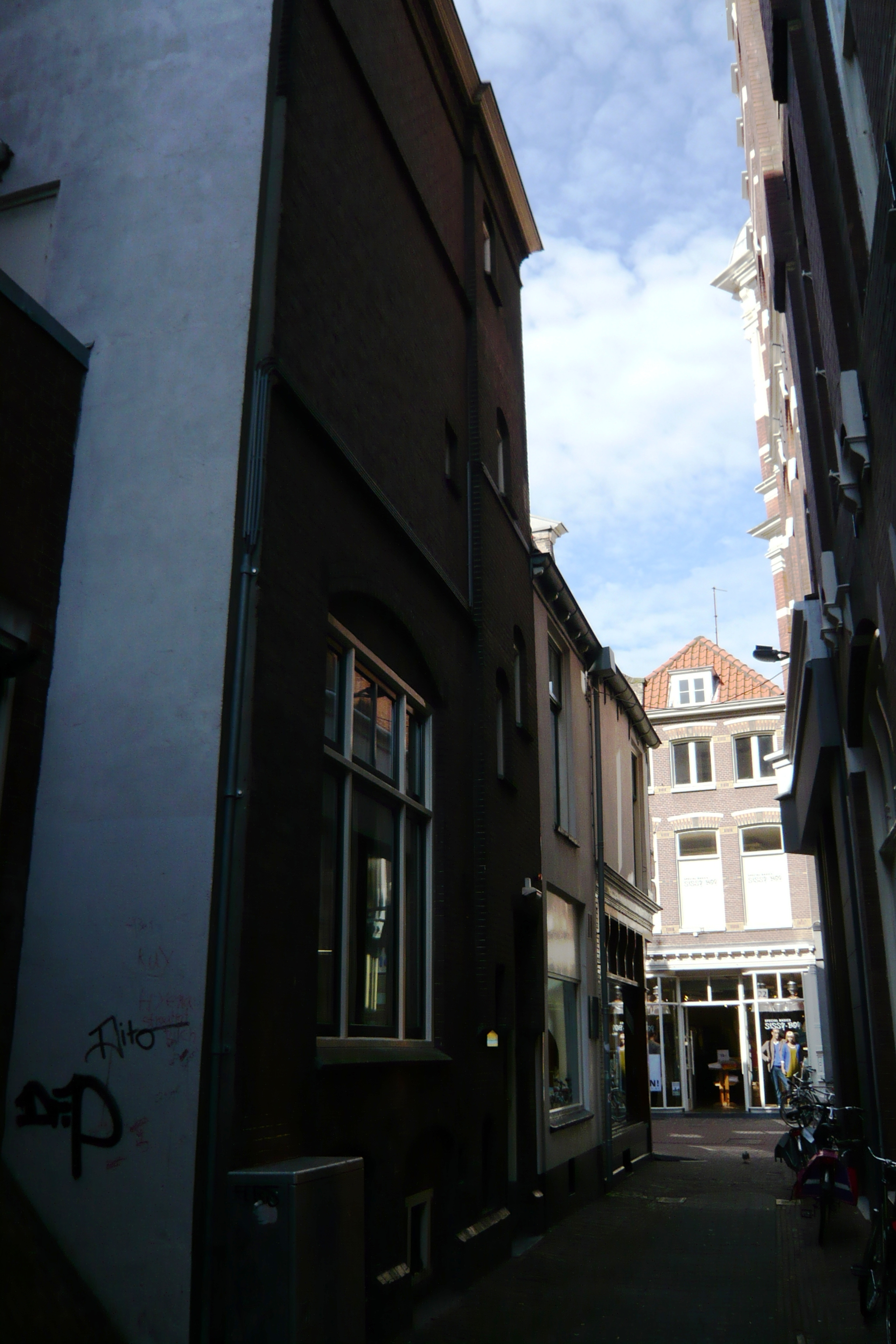
View from the Schoutensteeg, a side alley looking West towards the Barteljorisstraat

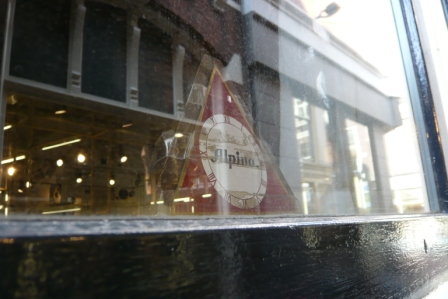
The Alpina triangle, which the Ten Boom family would place in their Schoutensteeg, Haarlem, shop window as an "all clear" sign

The museum is open from 10:00 to 15:30 Tuesday to Saturday.
