= Open Doors =

Christian international human rights organization

- Founded: 1955
- Founder: Andrew van der Bijl
- Type: Christian charitable organisation
- Legal status: Stichting
- Purpose: Supporting persecuted Christians worldwide
- Region served: 70 countries
- Revenue: $116.3 million (2015; including affiliates)
- Website: www.opendoors.org

Open Doors is a non-denominational Christian mission supporting persecuted Christians around the world. It works with local partners to distribute Bibles and Christian literature, give discipleship training and provide practical support, including emergency relief. It is based in Ermelo, Netherlands. Open Doors is a member of the Forum of Bible Agencies International.

== History ==
Open Doors was founded in 1955 by Andrew van der Bijl, a Dutchman more widely known as Brother Andrew, when he decided to smuggle Bibles to persecuted Christians in Communist Poland. He continued this work in smuggling Bibles to many of the Soviet-controlled countries and in 1957 was given a Volkswagen Beetle which he used to make deliveries within the Communist bloc. With this car he was able to carry more literature. Thereafter, the work of Open Doors continued to expand as it extended its network throughout Eastern Europe and the Soviet Union. The name "Open Doors" references a welcoming group with the doors being open at all times. He was responsible for smuggling millions of Bibles behind the Iron Curtain.

On 18 June 1981, Open Doors delivered one million contraband Chinese Bibles in one night to a beach near Shantou on a mission they named Project Pearl. Project Pearl was carried out by an international crew of 20, led by Brother David. A semi-submersible, 137-foot (42 m) barge Gabriella was loaded with 232 waterproof, poly-wrapped, one-ton packages containing a million Chinese Bibles. A 97-foot (30 m) tugboat Michael was used to tow Gabriella to the beach, weaving through a maze of anchored Chinese navy ships. The crew arrived at the beach at 9 pm. 10,000 Chinese Christians had gathered to bring the Bibles to shore and then deliver them all over China. Time magazine describes Project Pearl as "A remarkable mission… the largest operation of its kind in the history of China."

In 1988, Open Doors used Glasnost as an opportunity to openly provide one million Russian Bibles to the Russian Orthodox Church, at a cost of $2.5 million. Open Doors partnered with the United Bible Societies to complete the task in just over one year. In 2005, 428,856 people from over 70 countries signed Open Doors' global Right to Believe petition, saying Yes to religious liberty and No to the UN's Defamation of Religions Resolution. The petition was presented to the UN in New York in December 2010. In 2015, Open Doors (including its affiliates) delivered 3 million Bibles and literature, and delivered relief and aid to 239,164 people. In 2018, the U.S. organization spent $19,291,134 on programs to the persecuted church (72% of its budget) with $4.7 M spent on fundraising (18% of its budget) and $2.8 on administration (10% of its budget).

As of 2022, Open Doors was reportedly active in 70 countries. On September 27, 2022, Brother Andrew, the founder of Open Doors, died at age 94 at his home in Harderwijk, Netherlands.

== Programs ==
Open Doors and its affiliates conduct programs in many countries:

- Delivering Bibles and other Christian literature
- Providing pastoral and discipleship training
- Conducting seminars on Christian living, family life. "Standing Strong Through the Storm" is the seminar they use to teach churches on how to survive under persecution.
- Running Bible-based literacy courses
- Supplying equipment and vocational training to help widows, families of prisoners of conscience, the displaced, and the unemployed to earn a living
- Providing legal aid and spiritual and emotional comfort to prisoners and their families
- Financing and supplying equipment to pastors, churches, and Bible colleges
- Supplying printing presses, radios, cassette players, photocopiers, and A/V and transport equipment
- Sponsoring Bible colleges, reconciliation ministries and restoration centres for Christian refugees, widows and orphans
- Acting as a "watchdog group" and reporting on the killing of Christians in various countries

=== World Watch List ===
The organization publishes an annual "World Watch List" which ranks countries by the severity of persecution faced by active Christians. The list is based on research and comparison of field researchers, external experts, academics, and publicly available research documents but is subjective. In 2012, the methodology was comprehensively revised in order to provide greater credibility, transparency, objectivity and scientific quality. In 2013, further refinement of the methodology took place.

Countries are ranked on a scale from 0 to 100 depending on the persecution of church life, national life, community life, family life, private life and violence against Christians. Countries are categorized under "Extreme Persecution", "Very High Persecution" or "High Persecution". In 2021, all top 50 countries were in both the "Extreme Persecution" and "Very High Persecution" categories for the first time since the World Watch List was originally published. In 2022, Afghanistan overtook North Korea to become the country with the highest level of persecution. North Korea returned to the top of the list in 2023, with the highest levels of persecution ever seen. The report finds Nigeria and Sub-Saharan Africa at the epicentre of violence against Christians.

The 2024 list claims that the number of Christians suffering persecution and discrimination for their faith has risen to 365 million. In 2025, this had once again risen to 380 million.

Extreme levels of persecution

1. North Korea
2. Somalia
3. Libya
4. Eritrea
5. Yemen
6. Nigeria
7. Pakistan
8. Sudan
9. Iran
10. Afghanistan
11. India
12. Syria
13. Saudi Arabia
14. Indonesia (Aceh only)
15. Brunei Darussalam

Very high levels of persecution

15. Mali
16. Algeria
17. Iraq
18. Myanmar
19. Maldives
20. China
21. Burkina Faso
22. Laos
23. Cuba
24. Mauritania
25. Morocco
26. Uzbekistan
27. Bangladesh
28. Niger
29. Central African Republic
30. Turkmenistan
31. Nicaragua
32. Oman
33. Ethiopia
34. Tunisia
35. Colombia
36. Vietnam
37. Bhutan
38. Mexico
39. Egypt
40. Mozambique
41. Qatar
42. DRC
43. Indonesia (except Aceh)
44. Cameroon
45. Comoros
46. Tajikistan
47. Kazakhstan
48. Jordan
49. Malaysia (Peninsular Malaysia only)
50. Turkey

== See also ==
- Anti-Christian sentiment
- International Christian Concern
- Religious intolerance
- Religious persecution
