= Jeannette Clift George =

American actress

- George, circa 2010
- Born: Jeannette Clift; June 1, 1925; Houston, Texas, U.S.
- Died: December 23, 2017 (aged 92); Houston, Texas, U.S.
- Occupations: Actress; Playwright; Theater director
- Spouse: Lorraine George (1971-2004; his death)
- Parent(s): Hubert E. and Jeannette C. Clift

Jeannette Clift George, often credited professionally as Jeannette Clift (June 1, 1925 – December 23, 2017), was an American film and stage actress, playwright, and founder of the A.D. Players theater company in Houston, Texas. Clift was best known for her portrayal of Corrie ten Boom, a Dutch woman who hid Jews from the Nazis during World War II, in the 1975 biographical film, The Hiding Place. The role earned Clift a Golden Globe nomination in 1975 and a BAFTA Award for Most Promising Newcomer to Leading Film Roles in 1977.

== Early years ==
Born in Houston, Texas, George was the daughter of Hubert E. and Jeannette C. Clift. She earned her degree from the Department of Theater and Dance at the University of Texas at Austin.

== Acting ==
George's professional experience included acting with the Alley Theatre in Houston, Philadelphia's Playhouse in the Park, the District of Columbia's Arena Stage, and Houston’s Stages Repertory Theatre. She also toured with the New York Shakespeare Company.

In 1967, George founded the After Dinner (A.D.) Players Theater Company in Houston. She led the company, which produces six main shows annually, for more than 50 years until her death in December 2017. Her acting with the group spanned 44 years, beginning with IBID (1968) and ending with Whatever Happened to the Villa Real (2012).

In addition to her acting and theater careers, Clift was also an author and Bible teacher.

In the 1980s, George performed in the one-act, one-woman play Rachel, Woman of Masada, portraying a grandmother who survived a mass suicide at the ancient Masada fortress in Israel.

On screen, George (billed as Jeannette Clift) was best known for her role as Corrie ten Boom in the 1975 film, The Hiding Place. The film recounted the real-life story of Corrie ten Boom, a Dutch Christian woman who hid and rescued Jews from the Nazis during the German occupation of the Netherlands.

== Writing ==
Plays that George wrote include John, His Story, IBID, Whatever Happened to the Villa Real, Rowena, Virgule and Ret.

== Personal life ==
George was married to Lorraine Malcom George, who died in 2004.

== Death ==
George died on December 23, 2017, in Houston, Texas, at the age of 92.

== Recognition ==
George was named a "distinguished alumnus" by the University of Texas, and she received honorary degrees from Houston Baptist University and Dallas Baptist University.

She received a 1976 Golden Globe nomination for New Star of the Year—Actress for her role in The Hiding Place. In addition to that nomination, George was honored by the Association for Women in Communications with a Matrix Award for "outstanding contributions" as a playwright. She also received a Texas Baptist Communications Award in 1988, as a well as a Delta Gamma fraternity Shield Award.

== Legacy ==
The Jeannette & L.M. George Theater in Houston is named for George and her husband. Dedicated in 2017, the 450-seat theater is in the city’s Galleria-Uptown area.
