= Malle Babbe =

Painting by Frans Hals

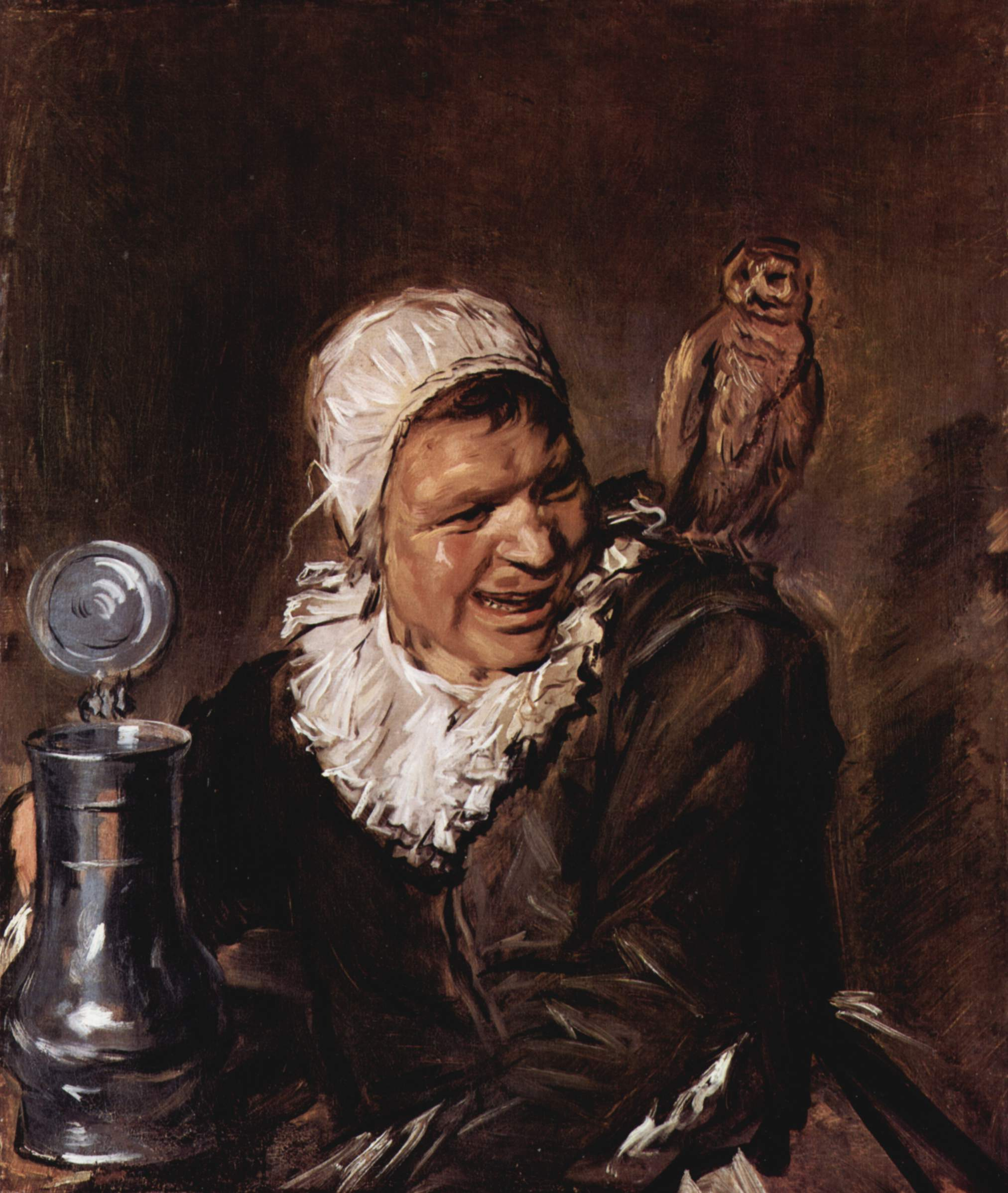
- Malle Babbe, c. 1633/35. Oil on canvas, 75 x 64 cm
- Artist: Frans Hals
- Year: c. 1633–1635
- Medium: Oil on canvas
- Dimensions: 75 cm × 64 cm (30 in × 25 in)
- Location: Gemäldegalerie; Berlin

Malle Babbe (Dutch pronunciation: [ˈmɑlə ˈbɑbə]) is a painting by the Dutch Golden Age painter Frans Hals, painted c. 1633-1635, and now in the Gemäldegalerie, in Berlin. The painting has also been titled as Hille Bobbe or the Witch of Haarlem. It was traditionally interpreted as a tronie, or genre painting in a portrait format, depicting a mythic witch-figure. The painting is now often identified as a genre-style portrait of a specific individual from Haarlem, known as Malle (meaning "crazy") Babbe, who may have been an alcoholic or suffered from a mental illness.

The painting has been an object of artistic admiration from Hals's lifetime, as there are several copies and variants painted by his followers. It was admired by Gustave Courbet, who made a copy of it in 1869 while it was on view in Munich.

== Painting ==
The painting is an oil on canvas measuring 75 × 64 cm and shows the face of a smiling woman, sitting at the corner of a table, apparently talking or laughing at someone or something to the right of the canvas. With her right hand, the woman is gripping a pewter beer mug with an opened lid. An owl sits on the woman's left shoulder. The clothing of the woman is simple and corresponds with the mode around 1630 in Haarlem. Her face is animated in an almost manic grimace. The very free handling of paint is typical of Hals' style, and not very different from that on his more formal commissioned portraits.

== Name ==
The painting was for a long time mislabelled as Retarded Man (alternatively The Witch of Haarlem) through a misreading of the inscription on the back of the picture frame which in fact reads Malle Babbe van Haerlem … Fr[a]ns Hals (Malle Babbe of Haarlem).

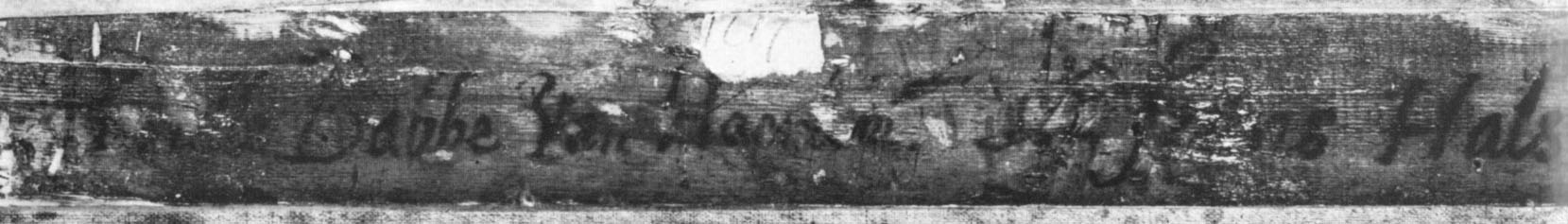
Inscription to verso: Malle Babbe van Haerlem ... Fr[a]ns Hals

Under the witch interpretation, the owl was considered a possible familiar. However the subject matter of Frans Hals in his other paintings would suggest that the painting is probably of a pub scene, in which case the owl would reflect the Dutch proverb, "drunk as an owl."

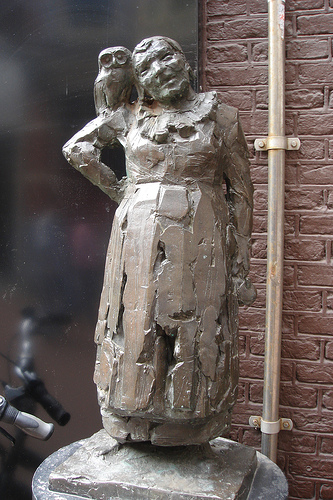
Bronze Malle Babbe, by Kees Verkade (1978), located on Barteljorisstraat, Haarlem

== The real Malle Babbe ==
Research in the Netherlands municipality of Haarlem showed that a real Malle Babbe actually existed, named Barbara Claes. She was included in a list of residents of the local hospital called Het Dolhuys, situated outside the city walls, which served people who were dangerous to themselves or to society, as well as a hospice for travellers arriving after the city gates had closed. Around 1642, Pieter Hals, a son of Frans Hals, was also in this hospice. Hals and this Malle Babbe had probably already met by this time, as she was evidently a known personality in Haarlem, although none other of her biographical details survive except that she died in 1663. In Dutch the adjective "Malle" signifies "loony" and it is not uncommon to see painters or writers depict this type of village figure. In this type of depiction one can find a record of unbalanced figures of society as belonging to the scenery of everyday life, or the artist may enjoy exploring the thin line between sanity and lunacy.

== Other paintings ==
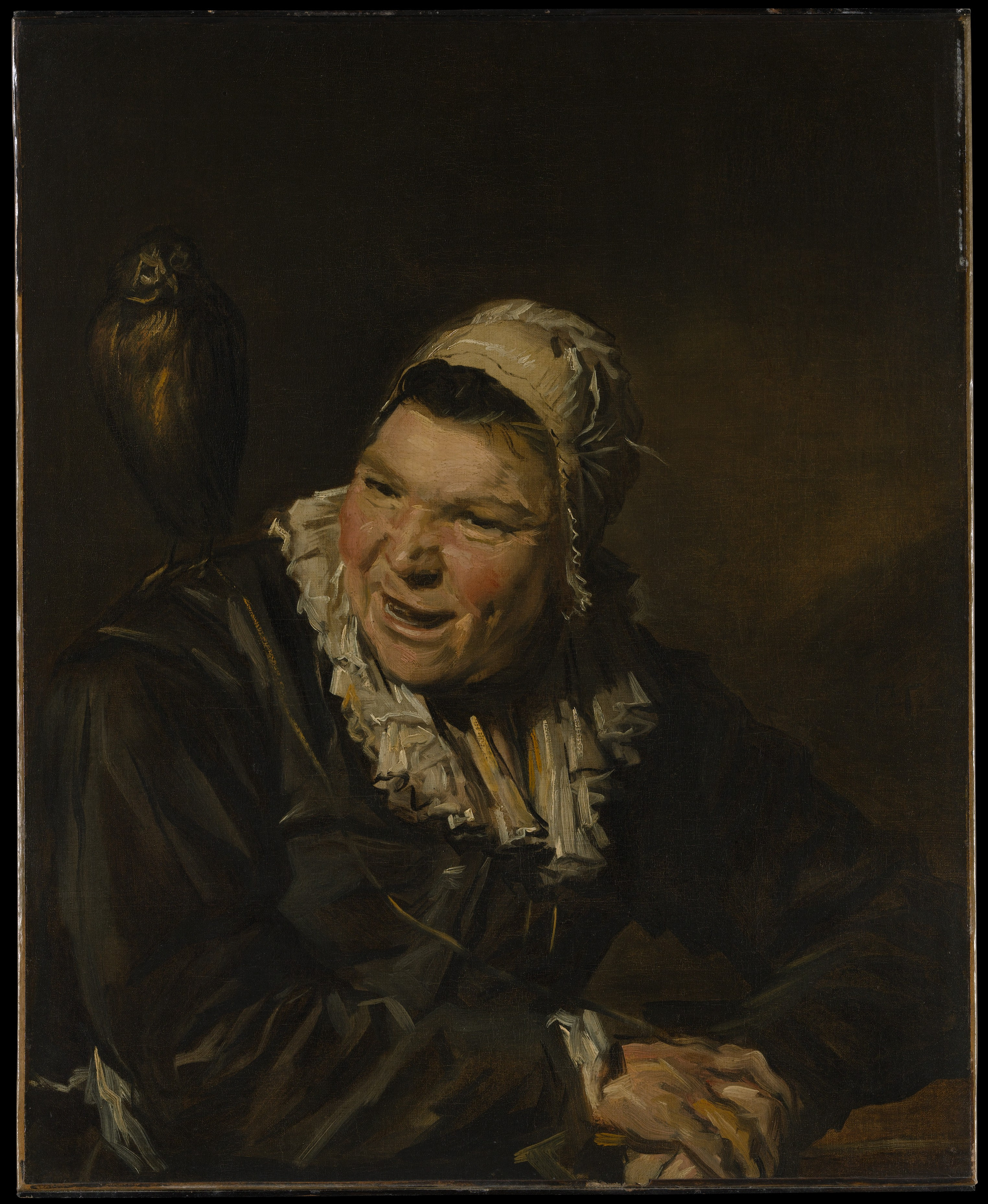
Malle Babbe, oil on canvas, 74.9 x 61 cm, Metropolitan Museum of Art

The Metropolitan Museum of Art in New York City is in possession of a similar painting. It is not clear who the creator of this painting is. In the past it was also attributed to Frans Hals, but it is now thought to be the work of one of his pupils.

Another variant depicts Malle Babbe accompanied by a male drinker. There are two paintings of unknown authorship in which she is depicted with a male figure adapted from a work by Adriaen Brouwer. Both figures are depicted behind a table full of fish. There are also two portraits apparently depicting Babbe, but without the owl.

Han van Meegeren created a version of the subject in the style of Vermeer which is now being exhibited in the Rijksmuseum.

== Song ==
External videos
- Hals's Malle Babbe, Smarthistory

In the Netherlands, the painting also gave its name to a well-known song, written by Boudewijn de Groot and Lennaert Nijgh and first performed in 1973 by Rob de Nijs. The actual subject of the song "Malle Babbe" however was inspired by another painting by Frans Hals, The Gypsy Girl, depicting a busty young woman, possibly a prostitute. The song celebrates her lusty sexuality. However, it also refers to her having frothy beer in a tavern, the setting for Malle Babbe, not The Gypsy Girl. Both pictures were seen by Nijgh in a 1962 exhibition.

== See also ==
- List of paintings by Frans Hals
