= Casper ten Boom =

Dutch resistance member in World War Two

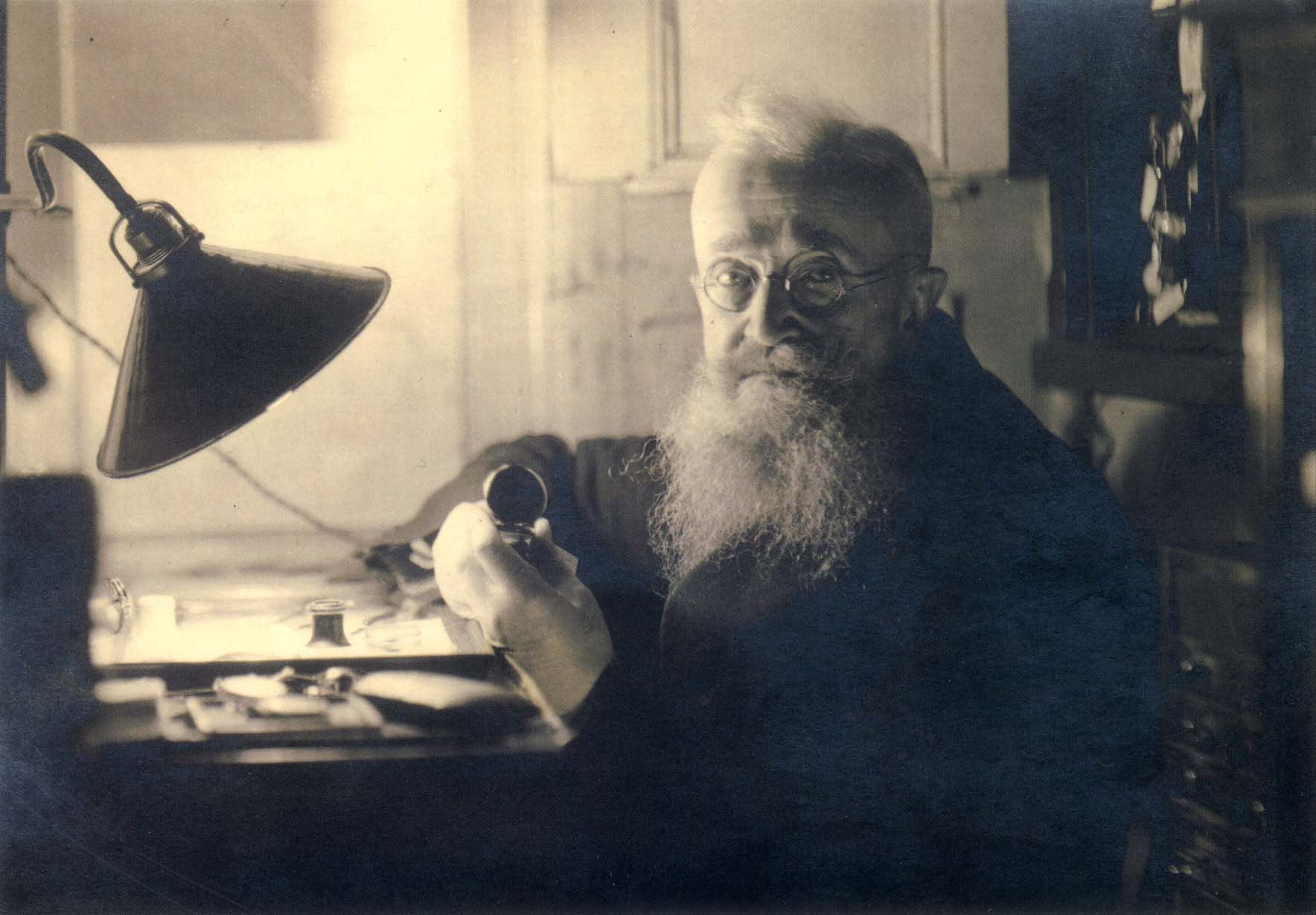

Personal details
- Born: 18 May 1859 Haarlem, Netherlands
- Died: 9 March 1944 (aged 84) Scheveningen Prison, Netherlands
- Denomination: Dutch Reformed Protestant
- Residence: Barteljorisstraat 19, Haarlem, Netherlands
- Parents: Willem and Elisabeth ten Boom
- Spouse: Cornelia Luitingh (m. 1884; died 1921)
- Children: Betsie, Willem, Hendrik, Nollie and Corrie ten Boom
- Occupation: Watchmaker
- Education: Primary school

Casper ten Boom (18 May 1859 – 9 March 1944) was a Dutch Christian who helped many Jews and resisters escape Nazi Germany during the Holocaust of World War II. He is the father of Betsie and Corrie ten Boom, who also aided the Jews and were sent to Ravensbrück concentration camp, where Betsie died. Casper died 9 March 1944 in The Hague, after nine days of imprisonment in the Scheveningen Prison. In 2008, he was recognised as Righteous Among the Nations by Yad Vashem.

== Background ==
Casper was born in Haarlem as the son of Willem ten Boom, who had a watch shop. When Ten Boom was 18, he started a jewelry store in Amsterdam. He had grown up in a family that belonged to the Dutch Reformed Church and had strong faith. While living in Amsterdam, he started a work among the poor people, Tot Heil des Volks (For the Salvation of the People). He later returned to Haarlem to live.

== Marriage and family ==
In Sunday school, he met Cornelia Johanna Arnolda Luitingh (commonly known as "Cor"), whom he married in 1884. Like his father, he lived and worked in the same building, with the shop on the ground floor and living quarters on the two floors above. He and Cor had five children, four of whom survived to adulthood: Elisabeth "Betsie" (1885–1944), Willem (21 November 1886 - 13 December 1946), Arnolda Johanna "Nollie" (1890 - 22 October 1953), and Cornelia Arnolda Johanna "Corrie" (1892–1983). Another child, Hendrik Jan (12 September 1888 - 6 March 1889), died in infancy. Casper's wife died in 1921 from a stroke.

While Willem and Nollie married and moved away, he lived with his two unmarried daughters, Betsie and Corrie, in their home and watchmaking workshop. The Ten Boom family belonged to the Protestant Dutch Reformed Church. Willem married Tine van Veen and had four children. Nollie married Flip van Woerden and had six children.

== Wartime activities ==
According to The Hiding Place, the family, in 1918, took in the first of many foster children whom they would shelter over the years. Corrie ran special church services for disabled children for 20 years. The Dutch Reformed Church "protested Nazi persecution of Jews as an injustice to fellow human beings and an affront to divine authority." The family strongly believed that people were equal before God.

During the Nazi occupation of the Netherlands, he and his daughters became active in sheltering Jewish people who were trying to escape the Nazis at their home. In May 1942, a woman came to the house and asked for help. She said she was a Jew, her husband had been arrested several months before and her son had gone into hiding. As occupation authorities had visited her, she was afraid to return home. She had heard that the family had helped other Jews and asked if she could stay with them, and Casper agreed. He told her, "In this household, God's people are always welcome." When the Nazis began requiring all Jews to wear the Star of David, he voluntarily wore one as well. His son Willem, a minister in the Dutch Reformed Church, also worked in a nondenominational nursing home. During the occupation, he sheltered many Jews there to save them from the Nazis.

== Arrest and death ==
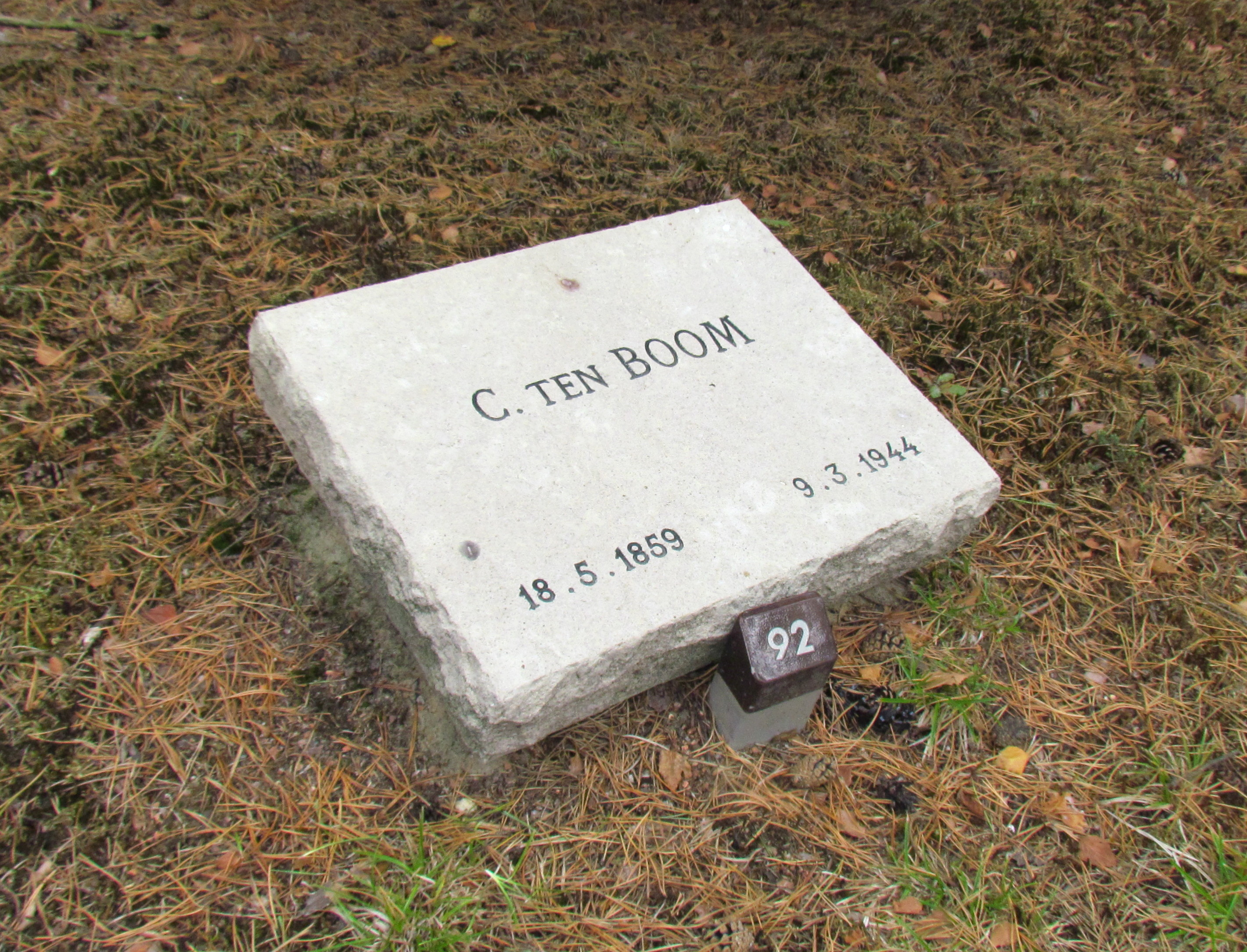
Gravestone of Casper ten Boom

On 28 February 1944, the Gestapo raided his house and arrested him, his daughters, his son Willem, and his grandson Peter, who were visiting. The Gestapo arrested other supporters, who visited the house during the day, taking a total of about 30 people to Scheveningen prison.

When he was interrogated in prison, the Gestapo told him that they would release him because of his age so that he could "die in his own bed". He replied, "If I go home today, tomorrow I will open my door to anyone who knocks for help". When asked if he knew he could die for helping Jews, he replied, "I would consider that the greatest honour that could come to my family." On 9 March, Casper died at the Hague Municipal Hospital, at the age of 84, after nine days in Scheveningen prison. Like all who died there he was buried in the dunes of Scheveningen. After the war he was reburied at the National Cemetery of Honours in Loenen.

His daughter Betsie died at Ravensbrück in December 1944. Willem contracted spinal tuberculosis while he was imprisoned for his resistance work. Although he was released, he died of tuberculosis shortly after the war. Willem's son Christiaan (commonly known as Kik), 24, was sent to the Bergen Belsen concentration camp for his work in the underground and died there during the war. Corrie was finally released from Ravensbruck several weeks after Betsie's death.

== Honours ==
In 2008, he was honored by Yad Vashem as one of the Righteous Among the Nations.

The Ten Boom Museum in Haarlem, situated in their former house, honors all the family.

== Sources ==
- Corrie ten Boom museum
- Corrie ten Boom Museum Virtual Tour
- Corrie ten Boom with John and Elizabeth Sherrill, The Hiding Place, Guideposts Associates, 1971. ISBN 0-340-17930-9, ISBN 0-340-20845-7
- Casper ten Boom – his activity to save Jews' lives during the Holocaust, at Yad Vashem website
