= John and Elizabeth Sherrill =

American author and Anglican priest

- Occupation: Authors, publishers
- Genre: Memoir, Christian inspiration
- Notable works: God's Smuggler, The Hiding Place, The Cross and the Switchblade

Website
- www.elizabethsherrill.com

John Lewis Sherrill (August 2, 1923, Covington, Tennessee – December 2, 2017) and Elizabeth "Tib" Sherrill, née Schindler, (February 14, 1928, Hollywood, California – May 20, 2023) were Christian writers and publishers. They co-authored a number of best-selling books, including God's Smuggler, by Brother Andrew; The Hiding Place, by Corrie ten Boom; and The Cross and the Switchblade, by David Wilkerson.

== Biographies ==
From 1944 to 1951 John Sherrill was a freelance writer in Europe. John Sherrill and Elizabeth Schindler met aboard a ship on their way to Europe and were married in Geneva, Switzerland in December 1947. From 1947 to 1963 Elizabeth was a freelance writer for magazines. In 1970 they founded a publishing company, Chosen Books, dedicated to searching "the world for books that would have two criteria. They would be interesting. They would be helpful." Their first title was The Hiding Place.

Elizabeth authored more than 30 books, many co-written with her husband. Some of these books have been translated into more than 40 languages.

== Personal lives ==
The Sherrills had three children: John Scott Sherrill, Donn Sherrill, and Elizabeth Flint. John Sherrill died on December 2, 2017, aged 94. Elizabeth Sherrill died on May 20, 2023, aged 95, in Hingham, Massachusetts.

== Bibliography ==
- David Wilkerson; Elizabeth Sherrill; John Sherrill (1962). The Cross and the Switchblade. Jove.
- Corrie ten Boom, John and Elizabeth Sherrill (1971). The Hiding Place. Guideposts Associates.
- Demos Shakarian, John and Elizabeth Sherrill (1975). The Happiest People on Earth. Steward Press.
- Brother Andrew; Sherrill, John & Sherrill, Elizabeth (2001). God's Smuggler. Chosen Books. ISBN 0-8007-9301-3.
- Brother Andrew; Sherrill, John; Sherrill, Elizabeth; featuring Jars of Clay (2001). The Narrow Road: Stories of Those Who Walk This Road Together. Baker Publishing Group. ISBN 0-8007-5793-9.
- Elizabeth Sherrill, All the Way to Heaven: A Surprising Faith Journey, Revell, 2002.
- John L. Sherrill, They Speak With Other Tongues, Chosen Books, 1999. (originally published 1964)
