= Andrew van der Bijl =

Dutch Christian missionary (1928–2022)

Anne van der Bijl
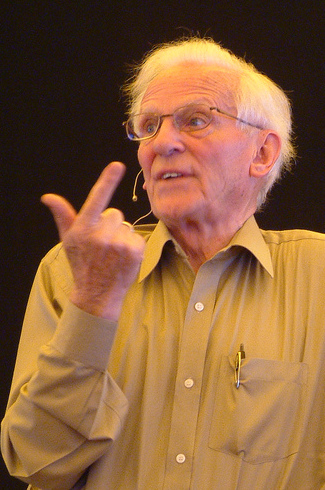
- Brother Andrew in 2006
- Born: 11 May 1928; Alkmaar, North Holland, Netherlands
- Died: 27 September 2022 (aged 94); Harderwijk, Gelderland, Netherlands
- Other names: Brother Andrew, "God's smuggler"
- Occupations: Christian missionary, author
- Known for: Founding Open Doors
- Spouse: Corry van der Bijl (m. 1958; died 2018)
- Children: 5

Andrew "Anne" van der Bijl (Dutch: [ˈɑnə vɑn dər ˈbɛil]; 11 May 1928 – 27 September 2022), known in English-speaking countries as Brother Andrew, was a Dutch Christian missionary and founder of the Christian organization Open Doors. He was known for smuggling Bibles and other Christian literature into communist countries during the Cold War and, because of his activities, he was nicknamed "God's Smuggler".

== Early life ==
Van der Bijl was born in Sint Pancras, the Netherlands, on 11 May 1928, the fourth of six children of a poor blacksmith and an invalid mother. In the 1940s he enlisted in the colonial army of the Dutch East Indies during the Indonesian National Revolution. After being involved in a massacre of Indonesian villagers while he was serving as a soldier, he endured a period of severe emotional stress, and later was wounded in the ankle during the fighting. During his rehabilitation, he began reading a Bible given to him by his mother. When he returned to the Netherlands he started attending church and committed himself to Christianity. In 1953, Van der Bijl studied at the WEC Missionary Training College in Glasgow, Scotland.

== Ministry ==
In July 1955, Van der Bijl visited Communist Poland to attend the 5th World Festival of Youth and Students in Warsaw, where he met a Christian bookstore owner who told him about a lack of Bibles in the Soviet Union. He signed up on a government-controlled Communist tour to Czechoslovakia, the only legal way to be in the country, during which he left the tour to meet with local Christian groups. Later that year, Van der Bijl founded Open Doors, a non-denominational mission supporting persecuted Christians. Open Doors was involved in smuggling Bibles and Christian literature, offering training for Christian leaders, and providing financial and other support for persecuted Christians.

In 1957, Van der Bijl travelled to the Soviet Union's capital, Moscow, in a Volkswagen Beetle, which later became the symbol of Open Doors. An older couple, the Whetstras, had given him their new car because they had prayed about it and believed that Van der Bijl would need the car. A man who lived in Amersfoort, Karl de Graaf, claimed that God told him to teach Van der Bijl to drive. Later, when Van der Bijl was in a refugee camp in West Germany, Philip Whetstra called Van der Bijl to come to the Whetstras' new house in Amsterdam.

Although Van der Bijl was violating the laws of all of the countries that he visited by bringing religious literature, he often placed the material in view when he was stopped at police checkpoints, as a gesture of his trust in what he believed to be God's protection.

Van der Bijl visited China in the 1960s, after the Cultural Revolution had created a hostile policy towards Christianity and other religions, during the era of the so-called Bamboo Curtain. He went to Czechoslovakia when the suppression by Soviet troops of the Prague Spring had put an end to relative religious freedom there. He visited with Czech Christians and gave Bibles to the Russian occupying forces. During that decade, he also made his first visits to Cuba, which was relatively easy for him to visit because the country did not require visas from Dutch citizens, to bring Bibles after the Cuban Revolution.

At that time, several Christian organizations, such as the American Bible Society and the Southern Baptist Convention's Foreign Mission Board, did not support the practice of Bible smuggling, calling it dangerous and ineffective, and noting that Bibles were "freely on sale" in many Iron Curtain countries. KGB informers ultimately infiltrated Open Doors, and the KGB tracked Van der Bijl's activities.

=== God's Smuggler ===
In 1967, Van der Bijl published the first edition of God's Smuggler, written with John and Elizabeth Sherrill. An autobiography, God's Smuggler tells the story of his early childhood, conversion to Christianity, and adventures as a Bible-smuggler behind the Iron Curtain. Due to the press exposure following the book, Van der Bijl stopped personally smuggling Bibles and Christian literature to other countries, and shifted to evangelism and fundraising campaigns in North America and Europe to support Open Doors. By 2022, it had sold over 10 million copies and was published in thirty-five languages. A comic book adaptation of God's Smuggler was published in 1972 by Spire Christian Comics.

== Later life ==
After the fall of Communism in Europe, Van der Bijl shifted his focus to the Middle East and worked to strengthen the church in the Muslim world, having visited Lebanon several times in the 1970s. In the 1990s, Van der Bijl again travelled several times more to the Middle East. In his book Light Force, he tells of Arab and Lebanese churches in Lebanon, Israel and Israeli-occupied areas expressing great delight at the mere visit of a fellow Christian from abroad since they felt that the church in the Western world at large was mostly ignoring them. In similar fashion, Van der Bijl and a companion, Al Janssen, visited Hamas and PLO leaders, including Ahmed Yassin and Yasser Arafat. Arafat granted Van der Bijl permission to open a Christian book store in the Gaza Strip. During the trip, Van der Bijl also spoke about Christianity at the Islamic University of Gaza. Later visits also included trips to Pakistan in the 2010s, where Van der Bijl attempted to meet with members of the Taliban. Van der Bijl criticized the US invasion of Afghanistan in 2001 and the 2003 invasion of Iraq, stating that American evangelical Christians were too supportive of these wars. He also criticized the killing of Osama bin Laden, having previously prayed for him, and called the operation "murder".

Van der Bijl's tenth book, Secret Believers: What Happens When Muslims Believe in Christ, was released in 2007.

Van der Bijl died at age 94 on 27 September 2022; he had been married for 59 years to his wife, Corry (who lived 1931–2018). They had continued to live in Holland and were survived by five children and 11 grandchildren. At the time of his death, Open Doors was active in over 60 countries. The ministry distributes 300,000 Bibles and 1.5 million Christian books and materials annually. The group is active in providing relief, aid, community development, and trauma counseling, while advocating for persecuted Christians around the globe.

== Books ==
- Brother Andrew; Sherrill, John; Sherrill, Elizabeth (2001). God's Smuggler. Chosen Books. ISBN 0-8007-9301-3.
- Brother Andrew (1974). The Ethics of Smuggling. Tyndale House. ISBN 978-0-84230730-7.
- Brother Andrew; Conn, Charles Paul (1977). Battle for Africa. Fleming H. Revell. ISBN 978-0-80070876-4.
- Brother Andrew (1981). Building in a Broken World. Tyndale House. ISBN 0-86065-170-3.
- Brother Andrew; Jackson, Dave; Jackson, Neta (1988). A Time for Heroes. Servant Books. ISBN 0-89283-395-5.
- Brother Andrew; DeVore Williams, Susan (1990). And God Changed His Mind. Chosen Books. ISBN 0-8007-9272-6.
- Brother Andrew; Sherrill, John; Sherrill, Elizabeth; featuring Jars of Clay (2001). The Narrow Road: Stories of Those Who Walk This Road Together. Baker. ISBN 0-8007-5793-9.
- Brother Andrew; Becker, Verne (2002). The Calling. Fleming H. Revell. ISBN 0-8007-5838-2.
- Brother Andrew; Janssen, Al (2004). Light Force. Fleming H. Revell. ISBN 0-8007-1872-0.
- Brother Andrew; Janssen, Al (2007). Secret Believers: What Happens When Muslims Believe in Christ. Fleming H. Revell. ISBN 978-0-8007-3264-6.
