= Betsie ten Boom =

Dutch concentration camp victim

- Born: 19 August 1885; Amsterdam, Netherlands
- Died: 16 December 1944 (aged 59); Ravensbrück concentration camp, Germany
- Resting place: Ravensbrück concentration camp, Germany
- Education: Through local secondary school
- Occupations: Bookkeeper, homemaker
- Employer: Casper ten Boom
- Known for: Righteous Among the Nations, The Hiding Place by Corrie ten Boom
- Height: 5 ft 3 in (160 cm)
- Parent(s): Casper ten Boom; Cornelia Luitingh
- Relatives: Corrie ten Boom (sister)
- Website: ten Boom Museum

Elisabeth ten Boom (19 August 1885 – 16 December 1944) was a Dutch woman, the daughter of a watchmaker, who suffered persecution under the Nazi regime in World War II, including incarceration in Ravensbrück concentration camp, where she died aged 59. The daughter of Casper ten Boom, she is one of the leading characters in The Hiding Place, a book written by her sister Corrie ten Boom about the family′s experiences during World War II. Nicknamed Betsie, she had suffered from pernicious anemia since birth. The oldest of four Ten Boom children, she neither left the family nor married, but remained at home until World War II. She was honored by the State of Israel in 2008 as a Righteous Among the Nations.

== Congenital pernicious anemia ==
Betsie ten Boom suffered from a case of pernicious anemia, believed to be caused by a malfunction of the gastric juices of intrinsic factor during the nine weeks before birth. Her illness prevented her from bearing children, so she chose, at a young age, not to marry.

== Career and education ==
Betsie ten Boom was educated in the local primary and secondary school until the age of 15. She remained at home to work with her father in his watch shop, where she served as the bookkeeper. She also cooked for their family.

Her younger sister Corrie later took over the bookkeeping role when Betsie caught influenza. Betsie then began housekeeping and continued to do so until her Nazi detention.

== 1940-1944 ==
The ten Boom family belonged to the Dutch Reformed Church and believed strongly in the equality of all people before God. Betsie’s brother Willem ten Boom was a minister, and the ten Boom sisters (Betsie, Nollie, and Corrie) had been active in charitable work before the war. During the Nazi occupation of the Netherlands, the family began to hide numerous Jews and resisters in their home and built a secret room to protect them.

In 1944, the ten Boom family and other people at the house, about 30 in all, were arrested for their resistance activities and taken to Scheveningen prison. The six Jews in hiding at the house were not discovered and all survived, with the help of other Resistance workers. Casper ten Boom became ill and died ten days later at the prison. Willem, Nollie, and a nephew were released.

In June 1944, Betsie ten Boom and her sister Corrie were sent to Ravensbrück concentration camp. Her strong faith in God kept her from depression throughout her life and especially within the camps. Corrie told of how Betsie reached out to help others and helped Corrie to see the best in everything, no matter what the circumstances.

Before her death, Betsie claimed she experienced three visions from God about what she and Corrie were to do after their release. Her first vision was of a house for former prisoners. The second was to own a concentration camp where they could teach Germans to learn to love again. The third was that they would be released before the New Year. All three of these visions came true. Betsie ten Boom died in Ravensbruck on 16 December 1944, at the age of 59. Her sister Corrie was released due to a clerical error and went on to set up the projects that she had seen in her visions, including traveling the world to speak about her faith.

Betsie and her father, Casper, were honored by the State of Israel in 2008 as Righteous Among the Nations. Her sister Corrie had been honored previously.
