= Corrie ten Boom =

Dutch resistance hero and writer

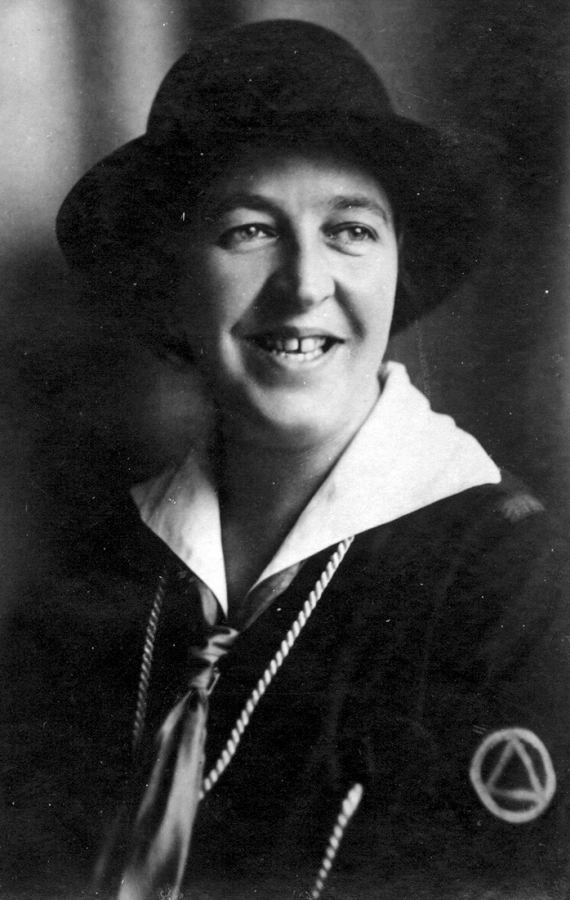
- Corrie ten Boom c. 1921
- Born: Cornelia Arnolda Johanna ten Boom; 15 April 1892; Haarlem, Netherlands
- Died: 15 April 1983 (aged 91); Placentia, California, U.S.
- Occupations: Writer, watchmaker
- Known for: Author of The Hiding Place, Righteous Among the Nations
- Parents: Casper ten Boom; Cornelia ten Boom-Luitingh
- Relatives: Betsie ten Boom (sister) Nollie ten Boom (sister)
- Website: Ten Boom Museum

Cornelia Arnolda Johanna "Corrie" ten Boom (15 April 1892 – 15 April 1983) was a Dutch watchmaker and later a Christian writer and public speaker, who worked with her father, Casper ten Boom, her sister Betsie ten Boom and other family members to help many Jewish people escape from the Nazis during the Holocaust in World War II by hiding them in her home. They were caught, and she was arrested and sent to the Ravensbrück concentration camp. Her most famous book, The Hiding Place, is an autobiography that recounts the story of her family's efforts and how she found and shared hope in God while she was imprisoned at the concentration camp.

== Early life ==
Corrie ten Boom was born on 15 April 1892 in Haarlem, Netherlands, the youngest child of Casper ten Boom, a jeweller and watchmaker, and Cornelia (commonly known as "Cor") Johanna Arnolda, née Luitingh, whom he married in 1884. She was named after her mother but known as Corrie all her life. Corrie had three older siblings: Betsie, Willem, and Nollie. Her three maternal aunts, Tante Bepa, Tante Jans, and Tante Anna, lived with the family. Her father was fascinated by the craft of watchmaking and often became so engrossed in his work that he forgot to charge customers for his services.

The Ten Boom family lived above Casper's watch shop in what Corrie called "the Beje" (pronounced bay-yay), a house named for the Barteljorisstraat where they lived. Corrie spent the first part of her life in charge of the housekeeping. However, when a cold sent Betsie, Corrie's sister, to bed for an extended period, Corrie took Betsie's place and began to work in the family watch shop. She quickly discovered that she loved the "business side" of the watch shop, and she organized the financial proceedings by developing a system of billings and ledgers. Even when Betsie recovered, Corrie kept her place in the shop and Betsie managed the housework, to the delight of them both.

She trained to be a watchmaker herself, and in 1922, she became the first woman to be licensed as a watchmaker in the Netherlands. Over the next decade, in addition to working in her father's shop, she established a youth club for teenage girls, which provided religious instruction and classes in the performing arts, sewing, and handicrafts. She and her family were Calvinist Christians in the Dutch Reformed Church, and their faith inspired them to serve their society, which they did by offering shelter, food and money to those who were in need. Some important tenets of their faith included the fact that the Jews were precious to God and that all people are created equal – powerful motivation for the selfless rescue work she would later become involved in.

== World War II ==
In May 1940, the Germans invaded the Netherlands. One of their restrictions was the banning of the youth club. In May 1942, a well-dressed woman came to the Ten Booms' with a suitcase in hand and told them that she was a Jew, her husband had been arrested several months earlier, her son had gone into hiding and Occupation authorities had recently visited her so she was afraid to go back. She heard that the Ten Booms had previously helped their Jewish neighbors, the Weils, and asked if they could help her too. Casper readily agreed that she could stay with them although the police headquarters was only half a block away. A devoted reader of the Old Testament, he believed that the Jews were the "chosen people" and told the woman, "In this household, God's people are always welcome."

Corrie and her sister Betsie opened their home to Jewish refugees and members of the resistance movement, and as a result, they were among those who were sought after by the Gestapo and its Dutch counterpart. The refugee work which Ten Boom and her sister did at the Beje became known by the Dutch Resistance, which sent an architect to the Ten Boom home to build a secret hiding place and an alert buzzer that could be used to warn the refugees to get into it as quickly as possible. Thus the Ten Booms created "The Hiding Place" (Dutch: De Schuilplaats). The secret room was in Corrie's bedroom behind a false wall and would hold 6 people. A ventilation system was installed for the occupants. A buzzer could be heard in the house to warn the refugees to get into the room as quickly as possible during security sweeps through the neighborhood. They had plenty of room, but wartime shortages meant that food was scarce. Every non-Jewish Dutch person had received a ration card, the requirement for obtaining weekly food coupons. Through her charitable work, Ten Boom knew many people in Haarlem and remembered a family with a disabled daughter, whose father was a civil servant who was now in charge of the local ration-card office. She went to his house one evening, and when he asked how many ration cards she needed, "I opened my mouth to say, 'Five,'" Ten Boom wrote in The Hiding Place. "But the number that unexpectedly and astonishingly came out instead was: 'One hundred.'" He gave them to her and she provided cards to every Jew she met.

Ten Boom's involvement in the Dutch resistance grew beyond gathering stolen ration cards and harboring Jews in her home. She soon became part of the Dutch underground resistance network and oversaw a network of smuggling Jews to safe places. All in all, it is estimated that around 800 Jews were saved by Ten Boom's efforts.

=== Arrest, detention and release ===
On 28 February 1944, a Dutch informant, Jan Vogel, told the Nazis about the Ten Booms' work; at around 12:30 p.m. of that day, the Nazis arrested the entire Ten Boom family. They were sent to Scheveningen Prison when Resistance materials and extra ration cards were found at the home. The group of six people hidden by the Ten Booms, made up of both Jews and resistance workers, remained undiscovered. Though the house was under constant surveillance after Ten Boom's arrest, police officers who were also members of the resistance group coordinated the refugees' escape. Ten Boom received a letter one day in prison, "All the watches in your cabinet are safe," meaning that the refugees had managed to escape and were safe. On the third day after the raid, resistance workers transferred them to other locations. Altogether, the Gestapo arrested over 30 people who were in the family home that day.

Though the Gestapo soon released most of the 30 people they had captured that day, Corrie, Betsie, and their father Casper were held in prison. Casper died ten days later. Corrie was initially held in solitary confinement. After three months, she was taken to her first hearing. At her trial, Ten Boom spoke about her work with people with mental disabilities; the Nazi lieutenant scoffed because the Nazis had been killing individuals with mental disabilities for years by their eugenics policies. Ten Boom defended her work by saying that in the eyes of God, a mentally disabled person might be more valuable "than a watchmaker. Or a lieutenant."

Corrie and Betsie were sent from Scheveningen to Herzogenbusch, a political concentration camp (also known as Kamp Vught), and finally to the Ravensbrück concentration camp, a women's labor camp in Germany. There, they held worship services after the hard days at work by using a Bible that they had managed to smuggle in. Through the two sisters’ teachings and examples of unfailing charity, many of the prisoners there converted to Christianity. While they were imprisoned at Ravensbrück, Betsie and her sister began to discuss plans for founding a place of healing after the war. Betsie's health continued to deteriorate, and she died on 16 December 1944 at the age of 59. Before she died, she told Corrie, "There is no pit so deep that He [God] is not deeper still." Twelve days later, Corrie was released. Afterward, she was told that her release was because of a clerical error and that a week later, all the women in her age group were sent to the gas chambers.

Ten Boom returned home amid the "hunger winter". She still opened her doors to people with disabilities who were in hiding for fear of execution.

== Life after the war ==
After the war, Ten Boom remained in the Netherlands and set up a rehabilitation center in Bloemendaal. The refuge housed concentration-camp survivors and until 1950 exclusively sheltered jobless Dutch who had collaborated with the Germans during the Occupation, after which it accepted anyone in need of care. She returned to Germany in 1946 and met with and forgave two Germans who had been employed at Ravensbrück, one of whom had been particularly cruel to Betsie. Ten Boom went on to travel the world as a public speaker, appearing in more than 60 countries. She wrote many books during this period.

One of these books is titled Tramp for the Lord and was written in the late 1960s and early 1970s. Each chapter tells a short, different story about her world travels and sharing the gospel message in Africa, Europe, the Americas, Asia, and even in difficult-to-reach and dangerous countries such as Soviet Union (now Russia), Cuba, and China. It features photographs of Ten Boom and her important messages of forgiveness, hope, love, and salvation through the saving grace of Jesus Christ.

Ten Boom told the story of her family members and their World War II work in her bestselling book, The Hiding Place (1971), which was made into a 1975 World Wide Pictures film, The Hiding Place, starring Jeannette Clift as Corrie and Julie Harris as Betsie. In 1977, the 85-year-old Corrie migrated to Placentia, California. In 1978, she suffered two strokes, the first rendered her unable to speak, and the second resulted in paralysis. She died on her 91st birthday, 15 April 1983, after suffering a third stroke. Ten Boom is buried in Fairhaven Memorial Park in Santa Ana, California.

A sequel film, Return to the Hiding Place (War of Resistance), was released in 2011 in the United Kingdom and in 2013 it was released in the United States. The film was based on Hans Poley's book, which painted a broader picture of the circle of which she was a part.

== Honors ==
- The Yad Vashem Remembrance Authority in Israel honored her by naming her Righteous Among the Nations on 12 December 1967.
- She was knighted by the Queen of the Netherlands in recognition of her work during the war.
- The Ten Boom Museum in Haarlem is dedicated to her and her family in recognition of their work.
- The King's College in New York City named a new women's house in her honor.
