= List of licensed and localized editions of Monopoly: Europe =

The following is a list of game boards of the Parker Brothers/Hasbro board game Monopoly adhering to a particular theme or particular locale in Europe. Lists for other regions can be found here. The game is licensed in 103 countries and printed in 37 languages. The longest-produced and most commercially successful edition in the UK and Commonwealth Countries is the original London version published in 1935.

== Austria ==
Austrian Edition ATS version

Copyright date: 1961	Released by: Parker Brothers	Issued through: General release, exclusive to Austria

Frei Parken	Ignaz-Harrer Straße; S.220	Ereignis-Feld	Auersperg Straße; S.220	Hellbrunner Straße; S.240	Nordbahnhof; S.200	Salurner Straße; S.260	Herzog-Ono-Straße; S.260	Wasser-Werk; S.150	Kaiserjäger Straße; S.280	Gehen Sie In Das Gefängnis
Viktringer Ring; S.200	Austrian Edition ATS version									Opernning; S.300
St. Veiter Straße; S.180	Austrian Edition ATS version									Hoher Markt; S.300
Gemeinschafts-Feld	Austrian Edition ATS version									Gemeinschafts-Feld
Beethoven Straße; S.180	Austrian Edition ATS version									Graben; S.320
Westbahnhof; S.200	Austrian Edition ATS version									Franz-Josef Bahnhof; S.200
Mozart Straße; S.160	Austrian Edition ATS version									Ereignis-Feld
Bismarck Straße; S.140	Austrian Edition ATS version									Römer Straße; S.350
Elektrizitäts-Werk; S.150	Austrian Edition ATS version									Zusatzsteuer (Zahle S.100)
Wiener Straße; S.140	Austrian Edition ATS version									Rhein Straße; S.400
Gefängnisbaliwi	Schloßberg; S.120	Herrengasse; S.100	Ereignis-Feld	Grieskai; S.100	Südbahnhof; S.200	Einkommensteuer (Zahle S.200)	Schloßpark; S.60	Gemeinschafts-Feld	Esterhazy Straße; S.60	Los (Ziehe S.200 ein)

Game description: This national edition is based on a standard board with street names from eight Austrian state capitals. Each capital gets one set of color properties. In order around the board, these include Eisenstadt, Graz, Linz, Klagenfurt, Salzburg, Innsbruck, Vienna, and Bregenz.

Österreich (Austria) Edition EUR version

Copyright date: 2001	Released by: Parker/Hasbro	Issued through: General release, EU only

Game description: This a board localized for the nation of Austria. Based on a Standard Edition game set, the streets used are from various Austrian cities. These include Eisenstadt (brown properties), Graz (light blue properties), Linz (maroon properties), Klagenfurt (orange properties), Salzburg (red properties), Innsbruck (yellow properties), Vienna (green properties) and Bregenz (dark blue properties). The set comes with standard currency denominations (1, 5, 10, 20, 50, 100 and 500); property values are given in euros. Pieces include green plastic houses and red plastic hotels.
Tokens: Ten metal tokens: Cannon, dog, wheelbarrow, car, battleship, iron, thimble, horse and rider, hat and shoe.
Other features: The train stations from the standard German edition are changed to North station, West station, South station and Franz Josef's station (in German: Nordbahnhof, Westbahnhof, Südbahnhof and Franz-Josefs-Bahnhof). This board edition also grants the same choice on the Income Tax space as the U.S. original; in this case it's 10% or €200. Many of the European boards simply charge €200. The Luxury Tax space is also called that (instead of the regular German Zusatzsteuer or add-on tax), but has a rate of €100.

== Belgium ==
There have been several editions of Belgian boards. They used to be either in Dutch or in French. Recent editions use bilingual game boards. Street names are taken from cities across the country, equally divided between the Dutch and French speaking halves of the kingdom. There are a few city editions also. All together -special editions included- there are some 53 listed versions using these variants, including translations of other variants (FIFA World Cup, Star Wars, etc.).

The currency values in the Belgian editions used to be francs. The bills that came with the set showed 20, 100, 200, 400, 1,000, 2,000, and 10,000 francs. The property and penalty prices are presumed to match the new billset, with the starting cash equal to 30,000 francs (1,500 x 20). Now the currency is the euro. Bills are the 500, 100, 50, 20, 10 and 1 euro coins with starting cash of 1500 euro.

Belgium Walloon Edition

Copyright date: 1938	Released by: Waddington (though suggested it may have been made by Miro, in France)	Issued through: General release in Belgium.

Parc Gratuit	SPA; Place du Monument; 4400	Chance	ARLON; Grand'Rue; 4400	HASSELT; Grand'Place; 4800	Tramway; Vicinaux; 4000	LIÉGE; Place St.Lambert; 5200	BRUXELLES; Rue de Laeken; 5200	Cie. De; Distribution; Des Eaux; 3000	GAND; Rue des Champs; 5600	Allez En Prison
COURTRAI; Rue de Lille; 4000	Belgium Walloon Edition									NAMUR; Rue de l'Ange; 6000
OSTENDE; Rue Adolphe; Buyl; 3600	Belgium Walloon Edition									VERVIERS; Place Verte; 6000
Caisse De; Communauté	Belgium Walloon Edition									Caisse De; Communauté
BRUGES; Rue des Pierres; 3600	Belgium Walloon Edition									HASSELT; Rue du Demer; 6400
Gare Centale; 4000	Belgium Walloon Edition									Gare Du Midi; 4000
KNOKKE Le Zoute; Avenue du Littoral; 3200	Belgium Walloon Edition									Chance
CHARLEROI; Rue de Marcinelle; 2800	Belgium Walloon Edition									ANVERS; Place de Meir; 7000
Cie. De; Distribution; D'Électricité; 3000	Belgium Walloon Edition									Taxe De; Luxe (pay 2000)
NAMUR; Avenue de la Gare; 2800	Belgium Walloon Edition									BRUXELLES; Rue Neuve; 8000
Prison	MONS; Grand'Rue; 2400	DINANT; Rue Grande; 2000	Chance	TOURNAI; Rue Royale; 2000	Gare Du; Nord; 4000	Impots Sur; Le Revenu (pay 4000)	MALINES; Rue Sainte- Catherine; 1600	Caisse De; Communauté	LOUVAIN; Rue de Diest; 1200	Départ

Game description: The Belgian Walloon edition of Monopoly features cities and streets from both the Walloon and Flemish areas of the country. The railroads are the three big Brussels railroad stations (Brussels North, Central and South) and one 'Buurtspoorwegen' or 'Chemins de Fer Vicinaux' which used to be the Belgian light railway and tram company. Electric Company and Waterworks stay the same, with translations.
Tokens: Colored wooden Man-What-You-Not-pin nets are used as tokens.
Other features: The houses and the (long) hotels are in the form of a triangular tent of beautiful shiny wood (later plastic). The dice are standard white plastic with black pips.

Belgium Flemish Edition

Copyright date: 1963	Released by: Parker Brothers/deSka Brussels	Issued through: General release in Flemish areas, in Belgium.

Vrij Parking	Leuvensestraat; 4400	Kans	Kortrijksestraat; 4400	Grote Markt; 4800	Buurtspoorwegen; 4000	Groenplaats; 5200	Lakenstraat; 5200	Waterleiding; 3000	Veldstraat; 5600	Naar De Gevangenis
Rijselstraat; 4000	Belgium Flemish Edition									Huidevettersstraat; 6000
Kapelstraat; 3600	Belgium Flemish Edition									Vlaanderenstraat; 6000
Algemeen Fonds	Belgium Flemish Edition									Algemeen Fonds
Steenstraat; 3600	Belgium Flemish Edition									Demerstraat; 6400
Station Centraal; 4000	Belgium Flemish Edition									Station Zuid; 4000
Kustlaan du Littord; 3200	Belgium Flemish Edition									Kans
Vlamingenstraat; 2800	Belgium Flemish Edition									Meir; 7000
Electriciteits Bedrijf; 3000	Belgium Flemish Edition									Extra Belasting (pay 2000)
Lange Zoutstraat; 2800	Belgium Flemish Edition									Nieuwstraat; 8000
Gevangenis	Leopoldstraat; 2400	Gasthuisstraat; 2000	Kans	Bondgenotenlaan; 2000	Station Noord; 4000	Inkomsten Belasting (pay 4000)	Bruul; 1600	Algemeen Fonds	Dieststraat; 1200	Start

Game description: This special edition features streets from Antwerp, Belgium. The language used is Flemish.
Tokens: Colored wooden Man-What-You-Not-pin nets are used at tokens.
Other features: The houses and the (long) hotels are in the form of a triangular tent of beautiful shiny wood. The dice are standard white plastic with black pips. The box on the original Flemish edition did not state as such, though a 1964 release did indicate the Flemish edition. The second 1963 release used official Monopoly money.

Brussels Edition (Bilingual)

Copyright date: 1991	Released by: Parker Bros./Tonka	Issued through: General release in Brussels, Belgium.

Parc Gratuit/ Vrij Parking	Rue StLéonard; 4400	Chance/ Kans	Lange Steenstraat; 4400	Grand Rue; 4800	Tramway Vicinaux/ Buurtspoorwegen; 4000	Grand-Place/ Grote Markt; 5200	Place De L'Ange; 5200	Cie. De Distribution Des Eaux/ Waterleiding; 3000	Rue Haute; 5600	Allez En Prison/ Naar De Gevangenis
Groenplaats; 4000	Brussels Edition (Bilingual)									Veldstraat; 6000
Rue Royale; 3600	Brussels Edition (Bilingual)									Boulevard Tirou; 6000
Caisse De; Communauté/ Algemeen Fonds	Brussels Edition (Bilingual)									Caisse De; Communauté/ Algemeen Fonds
Lippenslaan; 3600	Brussels Edition (Bilingual)									Boulevard D'Avroy; 6400
Gare Centale/ Station Centraal; 4000	Brussels Edition (Bilingual)									Gare Du Midi/ Station Zuid; 4000
Place Verte; 3200	Brussels Edition (Bilingual)									Chance/ Kans
Bruul; 2800	Brussels Edition (Bilingual)									Place De Meir/ Meir; 7000
Cie. De Distribution; D'Électricité/ Electriciteits; Bedrijf; 3000	Brussels Edition (Bilingual)									Taxe De Luxe/ Extra Belasting (pay 2000)
Rue De Diekirch; 2800	Brussels Edition (Bilingual)									Rue Neuve/ Nieuwstraat; 8000
Prison/ Gevangenis	Kapellestraat/ Kapelstraat; 2400	Place Du Monument; 2000	Chance/ Kans	Steenstraat; 2000	Gare Du Nord/ Station Noord; 4000	Impots Sur Le Revenu/ Inkomsten Belasting (pay 4000)	Rue De Diest/ Diestsestraat; 1600	Caisse De; Communauté/ Algemeen Fonds	Rue Grande; 1200	Départ/ Start

Game description: The Brussels edition of Monopoly features a mix of cities from Flanders, Wallonia, and Brussels. Ten street names come from Flanders areas, ten from Wallonia, and two additional street names are added from Brussels itself. The grid above incorporates both language versions; the French version is on the left and the Dutch on the right where two names are given. The railways are the same as the other respective versions, as are the utilities.
Tokens: Standard Monopoly tokens: thimble, wheelbarrow, car, boat, gun, horseman, hat, dog, shoe, and iron. This is the case with each city edition.
Other features: This version still uses the adjusted values and the franc bills. A second edition uses regular values and the regular bills, and was released in 2000. Under pressure from owner Hasbro, the edition presented in 2019 censored Manneken Pis, the 17th-century bronze statue of a naked boy urinating, with swimming trunks.

=== City Editions ===
Starting in 2000, Hasbro and TFL Games began releasing special -opoly editions based on cities in Belgium. The original Brussels edition got a facelift with a new board and standard dollar values and playing pieces. A number of Wallonian cities also got special editions, including Namur (capital of Wallonia), Liège, Charleroi, and Arlon, all in the Walloon Region along with 4 Flemish cities Antwerp, Ghent, Ieper, and Leuven.

Antwerp Edition

Copyright date: 2000	Released by: Parker / TFL Games	Issued through: General release in Antwerp, Belgium.

Gratis Parkeren	Schuttershof-straat	Kans	Oude Koornmarkt	Grote Markt	Franklin Rooseveltplaats	Anselmostraat	Noorderlaan	Antwerpse Waterwerken	Huidevetter-straat	Ga naar de Gevangenis
Kammenstraat	Antwerp Edition									Cogels Osylei
Groenplaats	Antwerp Edition									Jan van Rijswijcklaan
Algemeen Fonds	Antwerp Edition									Algemeen Fonds
Nationalestraat	Antwerp Edition									Leopoldstraat
Berchem Station	Antwerp Edition									Centraal Station
Kasteelplein-straat	Antwerp Edition									Kans
Carnotstraat	Antwerp Edition									De Keyserlei
Electrabel	Antwerp Edition									Extra Belasting
Vogelmarkt	Antwerp Edition									Meir
Gevangenis	Jordaenskaai	Holland	Kans	Major Peter Potstraat	Grote Pieter Potstraat	Inkomsten Belasting	Stadswaag	Algemeen Fonds	Sint-Jansplein	Start

Game description: The Antwerp edition of Monopoly features 22 streets of Antwerp as well as some railway stations within the locale.
Tokens: Standard Monopoly tokens: thimble, wheelbarrow, car, boat, gun, horseman, hat, dog, shoe, and iron. This is the case with each city edition.
Other features: The game is published in Flemish. The property values go back to normal values, and the bills included are the standard 1, 5, 10, 20, 50, 100, and 500.

Arlon Edition

Charleroi Edition

Ghent Edition

Leuven Edition

Liège Edition

Namur Edition

Ieper Edition

== Bulgaria ==
There exist two Bulgarian versions. The first was a translated version of the game with the property being taken from the capital city of Sofia, but it was not registered as a localised city-version. The second one, released in 2021, is under the moniker "Bulgaria is wonderful."

== Croatia ==
Croatian

Parking	Tršćanska ulica	?	Ciriški bulevar	Londonski trg	Sjeverna željeznička stanica	Minhenska ulica	Hamburški bulevar	Vodovod	Berlinski trg	Idi u zatvor
Rimski trg	Croatian									Varšavska ulica
Milanski bulevar	Croatian									Praški bulevar
Šansa	Croatian									Šansa
Venecijanska ulica	Croatian									Bečki trg
Zapadna željeznička stanica	Croatian									Istočna željeznička stanica
Pariški trg	Croatian									?
Madridski bulevar	Croatian									Azurna obala
Elektra	Croatian									Porez na luksuz
Atenska ulica	Croatian									Ženevski trg
Zatvor	Briselska ulica	Kelnska ulica	?	Atlanska ulica	Južna željeznička stanica	Porez na baštinu	Balkanski put	Šansa	Apeninski put	Start

Game description: Known as 'Monopoly'. The possessions are invented street names, mostly named after major world cities.

Croatian (edition 1994)

Copyright date: 1994	Issued through: Tonka Corporation

Besplatno parkiranje	Zametska ulica	Šansa	Kalelarga	Trg pučkih velikana	Osječki glavni kolodvor	Forum	Trg kralja Tomislava	Vodovod	Zrinska ulica	Idite u zatvor
Kapucinska ulica	Croatian (edition 1994)									Trg bana Jelačića
Istarska ulica	Croatian (edition 1994)									Korzo
Državna blagajna	Croatian (edition 1994)									Državna blagajna
Ulica S. Radića	Croatian (edition 1994)									Prokurativa
Riječki željeznički kolodvor	Croatian (edition 1994)									Željeznička stanica Slavonski Brod
Maksimirska ulica	Croatian (edition 1994)									Šansa
Obala Lazareta	Croatian (edition 1994)									Stradun
Elektra	Croatian (edition 1994)									Super porez
Ulica J. P. Kamova	Croatian (edition 1994)									Ilica
U zatvoru	Županijska ulica	Duga ulica	Šansa	Decumanus	Zagrebački glavni kolodvor	Porez na dobit	Zagrebačka ulica	Državna blagajna	Jeretova ulica	Kreni

Game description: Known as 'Monopoly'. The possessions are partially invented street names but the majority are real street names used in mayor Croatian cities.

== Czech Republic ==
Prague

== Denmark ==
Danish edition (Danish cities) (1961)

Gratis parkering	Filosofgangen	Chancen	Mageløs	Hunderupvej	Odense Banegård	Købmagergade	Nørregade	Vandforsyningen	Fiolstræde	Gå i fængsel
Vejlevej	Danish edition (Danish cities) (1961)									Gl. Strand
Lillebælts alle	Danish edition (Danish cities) (1961)									Gråbrødre torv
Statskassen	Danish edition (Danish cities) (1961)									Statskassen
Danmarksgade	Danish edition (Danish cities) (1961)									Vesterbrogade
Fredericia Banegård	Danish edition (Danish cities) (1961)									Københavns Hovedb
Dalgas avenue	Danish edition (Danish cities) (1961)									Chancen
Marselis boulevard	Danish edition (Danish cities) (1961)									Strøget
Elværkerne	Danish edition (Danish cities) (1961)									Særlig Indkomstskat
Store Torv	Danish edition (Danish cities) (1961)									Rådhuspladsen
Fængsel/På besøg	Mejl gade	Guldsmede gade	Chancen	Sct. Clemens stræde	Århus Hovedbanegård	Indkomstskat	Jomfru Ane gade	Statskassen	Boulevarden	Start - Modtag Kr. 20.000 hver gang du passerer

Game description: Two nearly identical versions, Matador and Monopoly. The Matador version was introduced in the 1930s, and the Monopoly version in 1996. Denominated in Danish kroner. Most expensive is City Hall Square (Danish: Rådhuspladsen). Additionally Monopoly Junior exists. The 1961 version featured streets from Denmark's four major cities Copenhagen, Aarhus, Odense, and Aalborg. The 1930s Matador version was localised exclusively with Copenhagen streets. In both versions, Copenhagen's City Hall Square, occupies the most expensive space on the board.

Odense A localized version was published in the 1980s, known as Kong Gulerod i Odense

== Estonia ==
Estonia edition (2001)

Tasuta parkla	Narva maantee	Loos	Tartu maantee	Pärnu maantee	Tondi	Gonsiori tänav	Rävala puiestee	Veevõrk	Estonia puiestee	Mine vanglasse
Pikk tänav	Estonia edition (2001)									Liivalaia tänav
Harju tänav	Estonia edition (2001)									Vabaduse väljak
Ühisfond	Estonia edition (2001)									Ühisfond
Suur Karja tänav	Estonia edition (2001)									Viru väljak
Tallinn Väike	Estonia edition (2001)									Balti Jaam
Sõpruse puiestee	Estonia edition (2001)									Loos
Mustamäe tee	Estonia edition (2001)									Viru tänav
Elektrivõrk	Estonia edition (2001)									Lisamaks
Paldiski maantee	Estonia edition (2001)									Raekoja plats
Vanglas/Lihtsalt külastad	Vene tänav	Aia	Loos	Uus tänav	Lilleküla (Station)	Tulumaks	Tatari tänav	Ühisfond	Ravi tänav	Start

Game description: Properties are streets and stations of Tallinn.

== Europe ==
European Union

Free Parking	Oxford Street (Great Britain)	Chance	Piccadilly (Great Britain)	Park Lane (Great Britain)	Athens Airport (Greece)	Via Veneto (Italy)	Via Condotti (Italy)	Water Works	Via Monte Napoleone (Italy)	Go To Jail
Las Ramblas (Spain)	European Union									Avenue Foch (France)
Gran Via (Spain)	European Union									Avenue des Champs-Élysées (France)
Community Chest	European Union									Community Chest
Paseo de la Castellana (Spain)	European Union									Rue de la Paix (France)
Portugal Airport (Portugal)	European Union									Dublin Airport (Ireland)
Kalverstraat (Netherlands)	European Union									Chance
Lange Poten (Netherlands)	European Union									Königsallee (Germany)
Electric Company	European Union									Super Tax
Coolsingel (Netherlands)	European Union									Kurfürstendamm (Germany)
Jail	Grand-Place/ Grote Markt (Belgium)	Rue des Bouchers/ Beenhouwers-straat (Belgium)	Chance	Avenue Louise/ Louizalaan (Belgium)	Luxembourg Airport (Luxembourg)	Income Tax	Slotsgade (Denmark)	Community Chest	Strandvejen (Denmark)	Go

Tokens: Twelve sights, each country one: Eiffel Tower (France), Brandenburg Gate (Germany), Windmill (Netherlands), Leaning Tower of Pisa (Italy), Sagrada Família (Spain), Grundtvig's Church (Denmark), Atomium (Belgium), Parthenon (Greece), Tower of London (Great Britain), Belém Tower (Portugal), Blarney Castle (Ireland), Church Saints Cosmas and Damian in Clervaux (Luxembourg)

European Union - Special Edition

Free Parking	Madrid	Chance	Athens	Dublin	Paris-Charles de Gaulle Airport	Copenhagen	London	European Court of Justice	Luxembourg	Go To Jail
Lisbon	European Union - Special Edition									Brussels
Vienna	European Union - Special Edition									Amsterdam
Community Chest	European Union - Special Edition									Community Chest
Stockholm	European Union - Special Edition									Rome
Frankfurt Airport	European Union - Special Edition									London Heathrow Airport
Helsinki	European Union - Special Edition									Chance
Bern	European Union - Special Edition									Berlin
European Parliament	European Union - Special Edition									Luxury Tax
Budapest	European Union - Special Edition									Paris
Jail	Warsaw	Bucharest	Chance	Sofia	Schiphol Airport	Income Tax	Riga	Community Chest	Vilnius	Go

Game description: Instead of streets, it uses the names of capital cities of countries which are already members of the European Union, in order of their admission to the EU (or its predecessor organizations), and some which are expected to be. Currency in euros.

== Finland ==
Finland (Helsinki) Edition

Vapaa pysäköinti (Free parking)	Lönnrotinkatu	Sattuma (Chance)	Annankatu	Simonkatu	Rautatieasema	Mikonkatu	Aleksanterinkatu	Vesijohtolaitos (Water Works)	Keskuskatu	Mene vankilaan (Go to prison)
Unioninkatu	Finland (Helsinki) Edition									Tehtaankatu
Snellmaninkatu	Finland (Helsinki) Edition									Eira
Yhteismaa (C.Chest)	Finland (Helsinki) Edition									Yhteismaa (C.Chest)
Liisankatu	Finland (Helsinki) Edition									Bulevardi
Sörnäisten asema	Finland (Helsinki) Edition									Tavara-asema (Freight depot)
Kaisaniemenkatu	Finland (Helsinki) Edition									Sattuma (Chance)
Siltasaari	Finland (Helsinki) Edition									Mannerheimintie
Sähkölaitos (Electric Company)	Finland (Helsinki) Edition									Lisävero (Luxury Tax)
Hämeentie	Finland (Helsinki) Edition									Erottaja
Vankilassa käynti (In prison/Just visiting)	Esplanadi	Kauppatori	Sattuma (Chance)	Rantatie	Pasilan asema	Tulovero (Income Tax)	Kasarmikatu	Yhteismaa (C.Chest)	Korkeavuorenkatu	Lähtö; 4000 mk (or €200 in the euro version)

Game description: Playing in the streets of Helsinki.

== France ==
Paris Edition

Parking Gratuit	Avenue Matignon	Chance	Boulevard Malesherbes	Avenue Henri-Martin	Gare du Nord	Faubourg Saint-Honoré	Place de la Bourse	Compagnie des eaux	Rue Lafayette	Allez en prison
Place Pigalle	Paris Edition									Avenue de Breteuil
Boulevard Saint-Michel	Paris Edition									Avenue Foch
Caisse de communauté	Paris Edition									Caisse de communauté
Avenue Mozart	Paris Edition									Boulevard des Capucines
Gare de Lyon	Paris Edition									Gare Saint-Lazare
Rue de Paradis	Paris Edition									Chance
Avenue de Neuilly	Paris Edition									Avenue des Champs-Élysées
Compagnie d'électricité	Paris Edition									Taxe de luxe
Boul. de la Villette	Paris Edition									Rue de la Paix
En prison	Avenue de la République	Rue de Courcelles	Chance	Rue de Vaugirard	Gare Montparnasse	Impôt sur le revenu	Rue Lecourbe	Caisse de communauté	Boul. de Belleville	Départ

Game description: Main French board, also updated for Monopoly - Nouveau plateau in 2005.
Other features: 1st color group lilac

Alsace Edition

Amiens Edition

Angers Edition

Avignon Edition

Bassin d'Arcachon Edition

Beauvais Edition

Besançon Edition

Bordeaux Edition

Brest Edition

Brittany Edition

Caen Edition

Camargue Edition

Chamonix Edition

Corse Edition

Côte d'Azur Edition (2000)

Parc gratuit	Menton: Promenade du Soleil	Chance	Antibes: Boulevard du Cap	Saint-Jean-Cap-Ferrat: Pointe Sainte-Hospice	Casino de Nice	Sainte-Maxime: Promenade Simone Lorière	Compagnie de distribution des eaux	Cassis: Quai des Beaux	Saint-Raphaël: Rue Félix Martin	Allez en prison
Juan-les-Pins: Boulevard Charles Guillaumont	Côte d'Azur Edition (2000)									Saint-Tropez: Quai de Suffren
Toulon: Boulevard de Strasbourg	Côte d'Azur Edition (2000)									Grasse: Boulevard J-H. Fragonard
Caisse de communauté	Côte d'Azur Edition (2000)									Caisse de communauté
Saint-Paul-de-Vence: Place du Jeu de Boule	Côte d'Azur Edition (2000)									Principauté de Monaco: Boulevard des Moulins
Casino de Monaco	Côte d'Azur Edition (2000)									Casino de Cannes
Le Lavandou: Avenue Delattre de Tassigny	Côte d'Azur Edition (2000)									Chance
Hyères: Avenue Gambetta	Côte d'Azur Edition (2000)									Cannes: La Croisette
Compagnie de distribution d'électricité	Côte d'Azur Edition (2000)									Taxe de luxe
Bormes-les-Mimosas: Rue Carnot	Côte d'Azur Edition (2000)									Nice: Promenade des Anglais
En prison	Bandol: Quai Général de Gaulle	Sanary-sur-Mer: Avenue Portissol	Chance	Cagnes-Sur-Mer: Boulevard du Maréchal Juin	Casino de Cassis	Impôt sur le revenu	Cavalaire-sur-Mer: Avenue des Alliés	Caisse de communauté	La Ciotat: Allée Lumière	Départ

Game description: Released on the occasion of the International Games Festival in Cannes.

Dijon Edition

Dunkirk Edition

Gironde Edition

Grenoble Edition

Guadeloupe Edition (1999)

Parc Gratuit	Basse-Terre: Champ d'Arbaud	Chance	Bouillante: Plage de Malendure	Pointe-à-Pitre: Place du Marché aux Épices	Marina de Saint-Martin	Jarry: Boulevard de Houelbourg	Basse-Terre: Boulevard Maritime	Compagnie de distribution des eaux	Deshaies: Pointe Batterie	Allez en Prison
Les Saintes: Baie des Saintes	Guadeloupe Edition (1999)									Petit-Bourg: Hauteurs de Vernou
Capesterre: Allée Dumanoir	Guadeloupe Edition (1999)									Pointe-à-Pitre: Rue Frébault
Caisse de communauté	Guadeloupe Edition (1999)									Caisse de communauté
Sainte-Anne: Plage de la Caravelle	Guadeloupe Edition (1999)									Saint-Claude: Plateau de la Soufrière
Marina du Gosier	Guadeloupe Edition (1999)									Marina de Saint-Barthélémy
Anse-Bertrand: Pointe de la Vigie	Guadeloupe Edition (1999)									Chance
Marie-Galante: Habitation Murat	Guadeloupe Edition (1999)									Hauteurs de Saint-François
Compagnie de distribution d'électricité	Guadeloupe Edition (1999)									Taxe de luxe
Le Moule: Baie du Moule	Guadeloupe Edition (1999)									Gosier: Pointe de la Verdure
En Prison	Route de la Traversée	Lamentin: Ravine Chaude	Chance	Pointe-Noire: Plage de Petite Anse	Gourbeyre: Marina de Rivière-Sens	Impôt sur le revenu	La Désirade: Petite-Terre	Caisse de communauté	Sainte-Rose: Sofaïa	Départ

Le Havre Edition

Lille Edition

Lorraine Edition

Lyon Edition (1998)

Copyright date: 1998

Parc Gratuit	Place Bellecour	Chance	Rue Auguste Comte	Rue Victor Hugo	Gare des Brotteaux	Boulevard des Brotteaux	Avenue du Maréchal de Saxe	Compagnie de distribution des eaux	Boulevard de la Croix Rousse	Allez en Prison
Rue de Brest	Lyon Edition (1998)									Rue du Président E.Herriot
Cours Lafayette	Lyon Edition (1998)									Avenue Foch
Caisse de communauté	Lyon Edition (1998)									Caisse de communauté
Rue Garibaldi	Lyon Edition (1998)									Cours Vitton
Gare de Perrache	Lyon Edition (1998)									Gare de Satolas
Cours de la Liberté	Lyon Edition (1998)									Chance
Avenue Jean Jaurès	Lyon Edition (1998)									Rue de la République
Compagnie de distribution d'électricité	Lyon Edition (1998)									Taxe de luxe
Rue Saint Jean	Lyon Edition (1998)									Boulevard des Belges
En Prison	Avenue Berthelot	Avenue Tony Garnier	Chance	Rue Marrietton	Gare de Lyon Part-Dieu	Impôt sur le revenu	Rue des Capucins	Caisse de communauté	Boulevard des États-Unis	Départ

Marseille Edition

Martinique Edition (1999)

Parc Gratuit	Sainte-Anne: Cap Chevalier	Chance	Trois Ilets: Domaine de la Pagerie	Route des Anses	Marina des Trois Ilets	La Montagne Pelée	Le François: Ilet Oscar	Compagnie de distribution des eaux	Rade de Saint-Pierre	Allez en Prison
Tartane: Chateau Dubuc	Martinique Edition (1999)									Fort-de-France: Quai de Suffren
Ajoupa Bouillon: Gorges de la Falaise	Martinique Edition (1999)									Rocher du Diamant
Caisse de communauté	Martinique Edition (1999)									Caisse de communauté
Montagne Vauclin	Martinique Edition (1999)									Les Anses d'Arlets: Grande Anse
Marina de Fort-de-France	Martinique Edition (1999)									Marina du Marin
Saint-Joseph: Coeur Bouliqui	Martinique Edition (1999)									Chance
Fort-de-France: Fort Saint-Louis	Martinique Edition (1999)									Trois Ilets: Pointe du Bout
Compagnie de distribution d'électricité	Martinique Edition (1999)									Taxe de luxe
Trace des Jésuites	Martinique Edition (1999)									Sainte-Anne: Les Salines
En Prison	Pitons du Carbet	Route de la Trace	Chance	Fort-de-France: Place de la Savane	Marina du François	Impôt sur le revenu	Le Precheur: Anse Couleuvre	Caisse de communauté	Route du Rhum	Départ

Metz Edition

Montcuq Edition

Montpellier Edition

Nantes Edition

Nice Edition

Nîmes Edition

Nord-Pas de Calais Edition

Orléans Edition

Pays Basque Edition

Périgord Edition

Poitou Edition

Reims Edition

Rennes Edition

Réunion Edition (2000)

Parc Gratuit	Les Avirons: Le Tévelave	Chance	Le Port: Rue François de Mahy	Saint-Leu: Rue du Général Lambert	Le Port	Saint-Paul: Rue du Commerce	Compagnie de distribution des eaux	Le Tampon: Rue Hubert Delisle	L'Étang-Sale-les-Bains: Avenue Octave Bénard	Allez en Prison
Saint-Joseph: Rue Raphaël Babet	Réunion Edition (2000)									La Saline-les-Bains: Route du trou d'eau
Saint-André: Avenue Bourbon	Réunion Edition (2000)									Boucan-Canot: Rue de Boucan-Canot
Caisse de communauté	Réunion Edition (2000)									Caisse de communauté
Saint-Louis: Rue du docteur Raymond Vergès	Réunion Edition (2000)									Saint-Gilles-Les-Bains: Forum
Aéroport de Saint-Pierre	Réunion Edition (2000)									Aéroport de Roland Garros
Saint-Benoit: Rue Georges Pompidou	Réunion Edition (2000)									Chance
Sainte-Marie: Route de Gillot	Réunion Edition (2000)									Saint-Pierre: Rue des bons enfants
Compagnie de distribution d'électricité	Réunion Edition (2000)									Taxe de luxe
Trois-Bassins: Rue du Général de Gaulle	Réunion Edition (2000)									Saint-Denis: Rue du Maréchal Leclerc
En Prison	La Plaine des Cafres: Route du Volcan	La Plaine-des-Palmistes: Rue de la République	Chance	Saint-Philippe: Rue Leconte Delisle	La Possession	Impôt sur le revenu	Sainte-Suzanne: Rue Pierre Mendès France	Caisse de communauté	Bras-Panon: Rivière des Roches	Départ

Saint-Étienne Edition

Strasbourg Edition

Toulon Edition

Toulouse Edition (2002)

Parc gratuit	Quai de la Daurade	Chance	Place Victor-Hugo	Place Occitane	Aéroport Toulouse-Blagnac	Allée Jean-Jaurès	Rue du Taur	Compagnie de distribution des eaux	Place Saint-Georges	Allez en prison
Boulevard Lazare-Carnot	Toulouse Edition (2002)									Rue de Metz
Rue de la République	Toulouse Edition (2002)									Quai de Tounis
Caisse de communauté	Toulouse Edition (2002)									Caisse de communauté
Rue Gambetta	Toulouse Edition (2002)									Rue Croix Baragnon
Gare Matabiau	Toulouse Edition (2002)									Carrefour de l'Espace
Place Wilson	Toulouse Edition (2002)									Chance
Avenue Honoré Serres	Toulouse Edition (2002)									Avenue Alsace-Lorraine
Compagnie de distribution d'électricité	Toulouse Edition (2002)									Taxe de luxe
Place Esquirol	Toulouse Edition (2002)									Place du Capitole
En prison	Rue des Filatiers	Rue Saint-Rome	Chance	Rue de la Colombette	Port Saint-Sauveur	Impôt sur le revenu	Rue du Faubourg Bonnefoy	Caisse de communauté	Rue Bayard	Départ

Tours Edition

Vendée Edition

Versailles Edition

== Germany ==
German Edition

Frei Parken	Theaterstraße €220	Ereignisfeld (Chance)	Museumstraße €220	Opernplatz €240	Nordbahnhof (Northern Station) €200	Lessingstraße €260	Schillerstraße €260	Wasserwerk €150	Goethestraße €280	Gehen Sie in das Gefängnis
Berliner Straße €200	German Edition									Rathausplatz €300
Wiener Straße €180	German Edition									Hauptstraße €300
Gemeinschaftsfeld (C.Chest)	German Edition									Gemeinschaftsfeld (C.Chest)
Münchener Straße €180	German Edition									Bahnhofstraße €320
Westbahnhof (Western Station) €200	German Edition									Hauptbahnhof (Central Station) €200
Neue Straße €160	German Edition									Ereignisfeld (Chance)
Hafenstraße €140	German Edition									Parkstraße €350
Elektrizitätswerk €150	German Edition									Zusatzsteuer (€100)
Seestraße €140	German Edition									Schlossallee €400
Im Gefängnis/Nur zu Besuch	Poststraße €120	Elisenstraße €100	Ereignisfeld (Chance)	Chausseestraße €100	Südbahnhof (Southern Station) €200	Einkommensteuer (€200)	Turmstraße €60	Gemeinschaftsfeld (C.Chest)	Badstraße €60	Los; Ziehen Sie im Vorübergehen €200 Gehalt ein

Other features: Los (Go) - DM 4,000 on classic boards, €200 on boards after 2000.

Aachen Edition

Aschaffenburg Edition

Baden-Baden Edition

Berlin (Schmidt Spiele GmbH) (1936) Edition

Copyright date: 1936	Released by: Schmidt Spiele GmbH, Berlin	Issued through: Schmidt Spiele GmbH

Frei Parken	Köpenicker Straße; RM 4400	Ereignisfeld	Warschauer Straße; RM 4400	Wiener Straße; RM 4800	Görlitzer Bahnhof; RM 4000	Oranien Straße; RM 5200	Gitschiner Straße; RM 5200	Wasser Werk; RM 3000	Belle Alliance Straße; RM 5800	Gehen Sie in das Gefängnis
Große Frankfurter Straße; RM 4000	Berlin (Schmidt Spiele GmbH) (1936) Edition									Friedrich Straße; RM 6000
Landsberger Straße; RM 3600	Berlin (Schmidt Spiele GmbH) (1936) Edition									Leipziger Straße; RM 6000
Gemeinschaftsfeld	Berlin (Schmidt Spiele GmbH) (1936) Edition									Gemeinschaftsfeld
Alexander Straße; RM 3600	Berlin (Schmidt Spiele GmbH) (1936) Edition									Unter den Linden; RM 6400
Bahnhof Alexanderplatz; RM 4000	Berlin (Schmidt Spiele GmbH) (1936) Edition									Potsdamer Bahnhof; RM 4000
Neue König Straße; RM 3200	Berlin (Schmidt Spiele GmbH) (1936) Edition									Ereignisfeld
Prenzlauer Allee; RM 2800	Berlin (Schmidt Spiele GmbH) (1936) Edition									Grunewald; RM 7000
Elektrizitäts Werk; RM 3000	Berlin (Schmidt Spiele GmbH) (1936) Edition									Zusatz Steuer (RM 2000)
Schönhauser Allee; RM 2800	Berlin (Schmidt Spiele GmbH) (1936) Edition									Insel Schwanenwerder; RM 8000
Im Gefängnis/Nur zum Besuch	Alt Moabit; RM 2400	Invaliden Straße; RM 2000	Ereignisfeld	Chaussee Straße; RM 2000	Lehrter Bahnhof; RM 4000	Einkommenssteuer (RM 4000)	Turm Straße; RM 1200	Gemeinschaftsfeld	Hutten Straße; RM 1200	Los; Ziehen Sie im Vorübergehen RM 4000 Gehalt ein

Game description: {{{Game_description}}}
Tokens: {{{Tokens}}}
Other features: {{{Other_features}}}
{{{Images}}}

Berlin Edition, including the 70th Anniversary Edition (Monopoly Heute or Monopoly Today)

Bremen Edition

Coburg Edition

Dresden Edition

Düsseldorf Edition

Essen Edition

Europa Edition

Copyright date: 2001	Released by: Parker/Hasbro	Issued through: General release, EU only

Game description: This was a special Europa (Europe) Edition of Monopoly, released in Germany in 2001. The board was released just before the euro was adopted, and features licensed paper replicas of the 5, 10, 20, 50, 100 and 500 euro notes. A package of licensed plastic replica 1 euro coins is also included. The dice come in the official Blue and Gold colors of the European Union, as do the houses (blue) and hotels (gold). The game board features the capital cities of twenty-two European nations, for buying, selling and trading. The European Parliament and the European Court of Justice take the places of the two utilities. Four major airports (London's Heathrow, Paris's Charles de Gaulle, Amsterdam's Schiphol and Frankfurt's Rhein-Main) take the places of the four railroads.
Tokens: The eight tokens represent famous European landmarks: The Palace of Westminster, UK, the Eiffel Tower, France, the Brandenburg Gate, Germany, the Leaning Tower of Pisa, Italy, a windmill, The Netherlands, the Manneken Pis, Belgium, the Sagrada Família, Spain and the Parthenon in Greece.
Other features: As the properties are nations and their capital cities, they are laid out in reverse order by the year they joined the European Union (or its predecessor organizations). Thus France and Germany occupy the dark blue spaces, and are the most expensive. Italy, the Netherlands and Belgium occupy the green spaces, Luxembourg, the UK and Denmark occupy the yellow spaces, and so on.

Frankfurt Edition

Copyright date: 2002	Released by: Winning Moves Games, Germany	Issued through: General release, EU only

Game description: This board is localized for the German city of Frankfurt am Main. Spaces on the board use streets and locations local to the city, as well as logos of local businesses and interests (for example: Eintracht Frankfurt, Senckenberg Museum). The train station spaces are the Central Train Station (Hauptbahnhof), Rhein-Main Airport (Flughafen Rhein-Main), East Harbour (Osthafen) and Hauptwache Underground station (U-Bahnhof Hauptwache). The set comes with now standard currency denominations (1, 5, 10, 20, 50, 100 and 500); property values are given in euros. Pieces include green plastic houses and red plastic hotels.
Tokens: Ten metal tokens: Cannon, dog, wheelbarrow, car, battleship, iron, thimble, horse and rider, hat and shoe.
Other features: The box proclaims that it is an Authorized Opoly Game. A diagonal band in the top left of the box reads Limitierte Neuauflage in € (New Limited Edition with euros).

Freiburg Edition

Fulda Edition

Giessen Edition

Göppingen Edition

Hamburg Edition

Copyright date: 2004	Released by: Winning Moves Games, Germany	Issued through: General release, EU only

Game description: This board is localized for the German city of Hamburg. Spaces on the board use streets and locations local to the city, as well as logos of local businesses and interests (for example: Hamburger SV, Hafen Hamburg, Reeperbahn or Jungfernstieg). Also, apart from the Hauptbahnhof (central station), the train station spaces read Flughafen Hamburg-Fuhlsbüttel (Hamburg Airport), Bahnhof Dammtor and Bahnhof Altona. The set comes with now standard currency denominations (1, 5, 10, 20, 50, 100 and 500); property values are given in euros. Pieces include green plastic houses and red plastic hotels.
Tokens: Ten metal tokens: Cannon, dog, wheelbarrow, car, battleship, iron, thimble, horse and rider, hat and shoe.

Hanover Edition

Heidelberg Edition

Heilbronn Edition

Ingolstadt Edition

Karlsruhe Edition

Kassel Edition

Kiel Edition

Köln (Cologne) Edition

Copyright date: 2002	Released by: Winning Moves Games, Germany	Issued through: General release, EU only

Game description: This a board localized for the German city of Köln (Cologne). Spaces on the board use streets and locations local to the city, as well as logos of local businesses and interests (for example: 4711 Cologne, and the Cologne Philharmonic). The set comes with now standard currency denominations (1, 5, 10, 20, 50, 100 and 500); property values are given in euros. Pieces include green plastic houses and red plastic hotels.
Tokens: Ten metal tokens: Cannon, dog, wheelbarrow, car, battleship, iron, thimble, horse and rider, hat and shoe.
Other features: The box proclaims that it is an Authorized Opoly Game.

Leipzig Edition

Lübeck Edition

Magdeburg Edition

Mainz Edition

Munich Edition

Nuremberg Edition

Oberhausen Edition

Regensburg Edition

Rostock Edition

Wiesbaden Edition

Wuppertal Edition

Würzburg Edition

== Gibraltar ==
Rockopoly - Monopoly version of Gibraltar

== Greece ==
Athens - Monopoly today version (Monopoly - Modern Greece, Μονόπολη - Σύγχρονη Ελλάδα) features city landmarks from Athens, Thessaloniki and Patras as well as place names around Greece. Currency is circulated by the use of plastic credit cards.

Standard Greek - Nolstagia Edition

Copyright date: 2011

Ελεύθερη Στάθμευση	Οδός Πραξιτέλους	Εντολή	Οδός Κοραή	Πλατεία Ομόνοιας	Σταθμός Λαρίσης	Οδός Σταδίου	Οδός Πανεπιστημίου	Εταιρία Ύδρευσης	Πλατεία Συντάγματος	Πήγαινε Στη Φυλακή
Οδός Αιόλου	Standard Greek - Nolstagia Edition									Οδός Ακαδημίας
Οδός Αθηνάς	Standard Greek - Nolstagia Edition									Οδός Σκουφά
Απόφαση	Standard Greek - Nolstagia Edition									Απόφαση
Οδός Πειραιώς	Standard Greek - Nolstagia Edition									Οδός Ηροδότου
Σταθμός Τατοΐου	Standard Greek - Nolstagia Edition									Σταθμός Πειραιώς
Οδός Πατησίων	Standard Greek - Nolstagia Edition									Εντολή
Πλατεία Κάνιγγος	Standard Greek - Nolstagia Edition									Λεωφόρος Βασ.Σοφίας
Εταιρία Ηλεκτρισμού	Standard Greek - Nolstagia Edition									Πρόσθετος Φόρος
Πλατεία Αμερικής	Standard Greek - Nolstagia Edition									Λεωφόρος Αμαλίας
Φυλακή - Μόνο Για Επίσκεψη	Οδός Αχαρνών	Οδός Λιοσίων	Εντολή	Πλατεία Βάθης	Σταθμός Πελοποννήσου	Φόρος Εισοδήματος	Οδός Επτανήσου	Απόφαση	Οδός Κυψέλης	Αφετηρία

Other features: Uses normal Monopoly Money but multiplicated by 100. So there are 100, 500, 1000, 2000, 5000, 10000 and 50000 bills. The currency is called δρχ. (Greek Drachma was used before the Euro) to add to the nolstagia theme.

90 Years of Shell in Greece - Collectible Edition: Treasures of Greece

Copyright date: 2016

Ελεύθερη Στάθμευση	Νάουσα Πάρος	Εντολή	Καλντέρα Σαντορίνη	Χώρα Μύκονος	1982 Shell Pecten	Λίνδος Ρόδος	Αρχαιολογικός Χώρος Μυκήνες	Εταιρία Υγραερίου - Coral Gas	Κνωσσός Κρήτη	Πήγαινε Στη Φυλακή
Αρχαίο Θέατρο Επιδαύρου Αργολίδα	90 Years of Shell in Greece - Collectible Edition: Treasures of Greece									Βεργίνα Ημαθία
Αρχαίο Θέατρο Δελφοί	90 Years of Shell in Greece - Collectible Edition: Treasures of Greece									Αρχαία Ολυμπία Ηλεία
Απόφαση	90 Years of Shell in Greece - Collectible Edition: Treasures of Greece									Απόφαση
Καλλιμάρμαρο Στάδιο Αθήνα	90 Years of Shell in Greece - Collectible Edition: Treasures of Greece									Ναός του Ποσειδώνα Σούνιο
1955 Shell Pecten	90 Years of Shell in Greece - Collectible Edition: Treasures of Greece									1992 Shell Pecten
Μετέωρα Καλαμπάκα	90 Years of Shell in Greece - Collectible Edition: Treasures of Greece									Εντολή
Μπούρτζι Ναύπλιο	90 Years of Shell in Greece - Collectible Edition: Treasures of Greece									Λευκός Πύργος Θεσσαλονίκη
Εταιρία Ηλεκτρισμού	90 Years of Shell in Greece - Collectible Edition: Treasures of Greece									Πρόσθετος Φόρος
Λίμνη Ιωάννινα	90 Years of Shell in Greece - Collectible Edition: Treasures of Greece									Παρθενώνας Αθήνα
Φυλακή - Μόνο Για Επίσκεψη	Γέφυρα Ρίου - Αντιρρίου Πάτρα	Μύρτος Κεφαλονιά	Εντολή	Ναυάγιο Ζάκυνθος	1930 Shell Pecten	Φόρος Εισοδήματος	Φάρος Αλεξανδρούπολη	Απόφαση	Καταρράκτες Έδεσσα	Αφετηρία - GO

Game description: Special Edition sold through Shell fuel stations. Shell Pecten refers to the Shell logo. In July 2010 Shell completed the sale of its downstream businesses in Greece to Motor Oil (Hellas) Corinth Refineries whose LPG fuel station brandname is Coral Gas.
Tokens: Shell pecten, Shell fuel pump, Shell motor oil canister, Shell oil barrel.
Other features: Houses are yellow and hotels are red.

== Hungary ==
Hungarian (Budapest) (1992)

Ingyen Parkolhatsz	Móra Park	Szerencse-Kártya	Oskola Utca	Dóm Tér	Déli Vasútvonal	Dobó Tér	Almagyar Utca	Vízmű Társaság	Gárdonyi Út	Irány A Börtön
Bethlen Utca	Hungarian (Budapest) (1992)									Kőfaragó Tér
Nagyerdő	Hungarian (Budapest) (1992)									Óváros
Meglepetés-Kártya	Hungarian (Budapest) (1992)									Meglepetés-Kártya
Meglepetés-Kártya	Hungarian (Budapest) (1992)									Ötvös Utca
Keleti Vasútvonal	Hungarian (Budapest) (1992)									Nyugati Vasútvonal
Janus Pannonius Út	Hungarian (Budapest) (1992)									Szerencse-Kártya
Színház Tér	Hungarian (Budapest) (1992)									Vörösmarty Tér
Elektromos Társaság	Hungarian (Budapest) (1992)									Pótadó
Egyetem Utca	Hungarian (Budapest) (1992)									Dunakorzó
Börtön	Kisfaludy Út	Lestár Tér	Szerencse-Kártya	Nagykőrösi Út	Északi Vasútvonal	Jövedelem Adó	Török Udvar	Meglepetés-Kártya	Piac Tér	Start

== Iceland ==
Iceland Edition

Copyright date: 2007	Released by: Parker Brothers/Hasbro Nordic	Issued through: Icelandic release only

Frítt stæði	Ármúli; 22.000 kr.	Áhætta	Síðumúli; 22.000 kr.	Suðurlandsbraut; 24.000 kr.	Akureyrar- flugvöllur 20.000 kr.	Bankastræti; 26.000 kr.	Austurstræti; 26.000 kr.	Orkuveita; Reykjavíkur; 15.000 kr.	Laugavegur; 28.000 kr.	Farðu í fangelsi
Krókháls; 20.000 kr.	Iceland Edition									Mávanes; 30.000 kr.
Fossháls; 18.000 kr.	Iceland Edition									Haukanes; 30.000 kr.
Samfélagssjóður	Iceland Edition									Samfélagssjóður
Lyngháls; 18.000 kr.	Iceland Edition									Blikanes; 32.000 kr.
Egilsstaða- flugvöllur 20.000 kr.	Iceland Edition									Leifsstöð; 20.000 kr.
Bíldshöfði; 16.000 kr.	Iceland Edition									Áhætta
Höfðabakki; 14.000 kr.	Iceland Edition									Smáralind; 35.000 kr.
Rarik; 15.000 kr.	Iceland Edition									Fjármagns- tekjuskattur borgaðu (10.000 kr.)
Stórhöfði; 14.000 kr.	Iceland Edition									Kringlan; 40.000 kr.
Fangelsi/Bara í heimsókn	Haukalind; 12.000 kr.	Jöklalind; 10.000 kr.	Áhætta	Kaldalind; 10.000 kr.	BSÍ Umferðar- miðstöðin 20.000 kr.	Tekjuskattur- borgaðu (20.000 kr.)	Brávallagata; 6.000 kr.	Samfélagssjóður	Bárugata; 6.000 kr.	BYRJUN; Þú færð 20.000 kr. í hvert skipti sem þú ferð hér framhjá

Game description: The spaces are named after streets in Reykjavík, and the currency is the Icelandic króna. As there are no railways in Iceland, the four spaces with railroads in the original edition are replaced with three airports and a bus station. The airport spaces have airplane symbols instead of locomotive symbols, but curiously the bus station space retains the locomotive symbol. The Chance and Community Chest cards lack the Rich Uncle Pennybags illustrations of the American edition.

== Ireland ==
For the Republic of Ireland (and not including Northern Ireland) in three versions, Irish pound (now discontinued) and euro, and a 'Here and Now' edition, with updated landmarks, and all monetary values multiplied by a factor of 10,000. Original version used mainly Dublin placenames, except for the red squares which were from Cork, and Shannon Airport as a station. On the new Irish language version published in 2015 by Glór na nGael Monopoly Dollars are used, to avoid any need for euro or sterling currencies, as the board is an all Ireland version.

Original Edition

Copyright date: 1972	Released by: Parker Brothers

Free Parking	Oliver Plunkett Street	Chance ?	Washington Street	Patrick Street	Heuston station	Talbot Street	Earl Street	Water Works	O'Connell Street	Go To Jail
Store Street	Original Edition									George's Street
Dame Street	Original Edition									Wicklow Street
Community Chest	Original Edition									Community Chest
Pearse Street	Original Edition									Grafton Street
Dublin Airport	Original Edition									Shannon Airport
Nassau Street	Original Edition									Chance ?
Merrion Street	Original Edition									Ailesbury Road
Electric Company	Original Edition									Super Tax
Dawson Street	Original Edition									Shrewsbury Road
In Jail/Just Visiting	Rathmines Road	South Circular Road	Chance ?	Rathgar Road	Busáras	Income Tax (pay £200)	Kimmage	Community Chest	Crumlin	Go (collect £200)

Dublin Edition

Free Parking	Abbey Street	Chance ?	Capel Street	Henry Street	Heuston station	Talbot Street	North Earl Street	Water Works	O'Connell Street	Go To Jail
Westmoreland Street	Dublin Edition									George's Street
Dame Street	Dublin Edition									Wicklow Street
Community Chest	Dublin Edition									Community Chest
Pearse Street	Dublin Edition									Grafton Street
Dublin Airport	Dublin Edition									Shannon Airport
Nassau Street	Dublin Edition									Chance ?
Kildare Street	Dublin Edition									Ailesbury Road
Electric Company	Dublin Edition									Super Tax
Dawson Street	Dublin Edition									Shrewsbury Road
In Jail/Just Visiting	Rathmines	South Circular Road	Chance ?	Rathgar Road	Busáras	Income Tax (pay £200)	Kimmage	Community Chest	Crumlin	Go

Ireland edition (2000)

Free Parking	Newcastle West, Co. Limerick	Chance	Kilmacthomas, Co. Waterford	Waterford, Co. Waterford	Dún Laoghaire	Johnson Place, Dublin	Ormand Quay, Dublin	Communications	Shelbourne Park, Dublin	Go To Jail
O'Connell Street, Dublin	Ireland edition (2000)									Wellington Quay, Dublin
Greenhills Road, Dublin	Ireland edition (2000)									IFSC, Dublin
Community Chest	Ireland edition (2000)									Community Chest
The Blanchardstown Centre, Dublin	Ireland edition (2000)									Sandyford Industrial Est., Dublin
Shannon Airport	Ireland edition (2000)									Busáras Dublin
Straffan, Co. Kildare	Ireland edition (2000)									Chance
Lansdowne Road, Dublin	Ireland edition (2000)									Gov. Buildings
Energy Company	Ireland edition (2000)									Bank Deposit
Croke Park, Dublin	Ireland edition (2000)									Dublin Castle
Jail	New Grange, Co. Meath	Aran Islands, Co. Galway	Chance	Rock of Cashel, Co. Tipperary	Kent Station, Cork	Income Tax	Upper Merrion Street, Dublin	Community Chest	Dawson Street, Dublin	Go

Glór na nGael Irish language edition (2015)

Páirceáil Saor in aisce	An Blascaod Mór	Deis	Oileáin Árann	Reachlainn	Cúige Chonnacht	Brú na Bóinne	An Cóbh	www.udar.ie	Grianán Ailigh	Téigh go dtí Príosún
Corrán Tuathail	Glór na nGael Irish language edition (2015)									Cnoc an Anfa
Binn Ghulbain	Glór na nGael Irish language edition (2015)									Teach Laighean
Ciste Pobail	Glór na nGael Irish language edition (2015)									Ciste Pobail
Cnoc Maol Réidh	Glór na nGael Irish language edition (2015)									Áras an Uachtaráin
Cúige Mumhan	Glór na nGael Irish language edition (2015)									Cúige Laighean
Cluain Mhic Nóis	Glór na nGael Irish language edition (2015)									Deis
Ardeaglais Naomh Phádraig Ard Mhacha	Glór na nGael Irish language edition (2015)									Teach an Phiarsaigh
www.focloir.ie	Glór na nGael Irish language edition (2015)									Cáin Ioncaim
Ardeaglais Naomh Phádraig Baile Átha Cliath	Glór na nGael Irish language edition (2015)									Ard-oifig an Phoist
Príosún	Carraig Phádraig	Boirinn	Deis	Clochán an Aifir	Cúige Uladh	Cáin Bóithre	Cionn Mhálanna	Ciste Pobail	Ceann Léime	Gabh

Game description: The first-ever Irish language version of the game to be published, this version produced by Glór na nGael with support from Foras na Gaeilge. Each colour group has a different theme — brown: headlands; light blue: rocks; dark orchid: religious sites; orange: mountains; red: islands; yellow: ancient sites; green: political buildings; blue: sites associated with the Easter Rising; stations: provinces; utilities: Irish-language websites.
Other features: Uses Monopoly Dollars to avoid the use of either euro or pound sterling, as this board is an all-Ireland version of the game.
Uses images for all of the sites mentioned.

== Isle of Man ==
Isle of Man Edition (2011)

Free Parking	Gaiety Theatre £220	Chance; 3FM	Isle of Man Newspapers £220	Villa Marina £240	Douglas Horse Trams £200	Castle Rushen £260	Peel Castle £260	Laxey Wheel £150	Tower of Refuge £280	Go To Jail
Manx Museum £200	Isle of Man Edition (2011)									Conister Bank £300
Cregneash Village Folk Museum £180	Isle of Man Edition (2011)									Shoprite £300
Community Chest; Isle of Man Bank	Isle of Man Edition (2011)									Community Chest; Isle of Man Bank
Camera Obscura £180	Isle of Man Edition (2011)									The Sefton Hotel £320
Isle of Man Steam Railway £200	Isle of Man Edition (2011)									Isle of Man Sea Terminal £200
National Sports Centre £160	Isle of Man Edition (2011)									Chance; Manx Radio
Isle of Man Welcome Centre £140	Isle of Man Edition (2011)									Tynwald Hill £350
Telecoms Company; Sure £150	Isle of Man Edition (2011)									Bank Deposit £100
Fairy Bridge £140	Isle of Man Edition (2011)									TT Grandstand £400
In Jail/Just Visiting	Port St Mary £120	Port Erin £100	Chance; Energy FM	Niarbyl Bay £100	Snaefell Mountain Railway £200	Income Tax £200	Snaefell Mountain £60	Community Chest; Isle of Man Bank	Nobles Park £60	Go (collect £200)

Game description: In 2011 an Isle of Man edition was released. The two most expensive properties on the board are the Isle of Man TT Grandstand and Tynwald Hill, home of the island's parliament. Each of the island's transport types is represented where London railway terminals are traditionally located. The currency used was the Manx Pound

== Italy ==
=== Cities ===
Bergamo Edition

Brescia Edition

Forte dei Marmi Edition

Lago di Garda Edition

Milan Edition (Monopoli)

Posteggio gratuito	Via Marco Polo	Imprevisti (Chance)	Corso Magellano	Largo Colombo	Stazione Nord	Viale Costantino	Viale Traiano	Società Acqua Potabile	Piazza Giulio Cesare	In Prigione!
Piazza Dante	Milan Edition (Monopoli)									Via Roma
Corso Raffaello	Milan Edition (Monopoli)									Corso Impero
Probabilità (C.Chest)	Milan Edition (Monopoli)									Probabilità (C.Chest)
Via Verdi	Milan Edition (Monopoli)									Largo Augusto
Stazione Ovest	Milan Edition (Monopoli)									Stazione Est
Piazza Università	Milan Edition (Monopoli)									Imprevisti (Chance)
Corso Ateneo	Milan Edition (Monopoli)									Viale dei Giardini
Società Elettrica	Milan Edition (Monopoli)									Tassa di lusso (10,000 Lire)
Via Accademia	Milan Edition (Monopoli)									Parco della Vittoria
Prigione	Viale Vesuvio	Viale Monterosa	Imprevisti (Chance)	Bastioni Gran Sasso	Stazione Sud	Tassa patrimoniale (20,000 Lire)	Vicolo Stretto	Probabilità (C.Chest)	Vicolo Corto	VIA! (20,000 Lire, pre-2000)

Metropolitan City of Milan Mega Edition

Monopoli Edition

Naples Edition

Palermo Edition

Parma Edition

Rimini Edition

Rome Edition

San Marino Edition

Serenissima Edition

Turin Edition

Verona Edition

=== Regions ===
I Borghi più belli d'Italia's Series:

Abruzzo & Molise Edition

Apulia & Basilicata Edition

Liguria Edition

Lombardy Edition

Marche Edition

Piedmont & Val d'Aosta Edition

Sicily Edition

Tuscany Edition

Umbria Edition

Veneto Edition

== Lithuania ==
Lithuanian (Vilnius)

Copyright date: 2005	Released by: Hasbro	Issued through: Voira

Nemokama stovėjimo aikštelė	Žirmūnų gatvė	Šansas	Antakalnio gatvė	A. Goštauto gatvė	Kauno geležinkelio stotis	Kalvarijų gatvė	Laisvės prospektas	Vandentiekis	Ukmergės gatvė	Eik į kalėjimą
Savanorių prospektas	Lithuanian (Vilnius)									Pilies gatvė
J. Basanavičiaus gatvė	Lithuanian (Vilnius)									Vokiečių gatvė
Bendruomenės iždas	Lithuanian (Vilnius)									Bendruomenė iždas
Pylimo gatvė	Lithuanian (Vilnius)									Vilniaus gatvė
Klaipėdos geležinkelio stotis	Lithuanian (Vilnius)									Vilniaus geležinkelio stotis
Dariaus ir Girėno gatvė	Lithuanian (Vilnius)									Šansas
Švitrigailos gatvė	Lithuanian (Vilnius)									Konstitucijos prospektas
Elektros tinklai	Lithuanian (Vilnius)									Turto mokestis
Kauno gatvė	Lithuanian (Vilnius)									Gedimino prospektas
Lukiškių kalėjimas	Kęstučio gatvė	Vytauto gatvė	Šansas	Latvių gatvė	Šiaulių geležinkelio stotis	Pajamų mokestis	Gariūnų gatvė	Bendruomenės iždas	Kirtimų gatvė	EIK. Pasiimk 200 Lt, kai praeisi

Game description: The streets are in Vilnius. Railway stations are in four largest Lithuania cities: Vilnius, Kaunas, Klaipėda and Šiauliai. The game is called Monopolis.

== Luxembourg ==
Luxembourg edition (2000)

Fräi Parken	Friddenplatz käl Téiteng	Ereegnesfeld	Avenue des Alliés; Ettelbréck	Rue Basse; Schëffleng	Nordgare	Route de Mondorf; Beetebuerg	Rue de la Montagne; Hesper	Wasserwierk	Rue du Château; Suessem	Gitt an de prisong
Place de l'Église; Miersch	Luxembourg edition (2000)									Rue de l'hôtel de ville Péiteng
Rue du Marché; Mamer	Luxembourg edition (2000)									Rue du Commerce; Diddeleng
Gemeinschaftsfeld	Luxembourg edition (2000)									Gemeinschaftsfeld
Rue du Nord; Walfer	Luxembourg edition (2000)									Avenue de la Liberté; Déifferdéng
Westgare	Luxembourg edition (2000)									Ostgare
Lëtzebuergerstrooss; Nidderkäerjeng	Luxembourg edition (2000)									Ereegnesfeld
Route d'Esch; Monnerech	Luxembourg edition (2000)									Uelzechtsstrooss; Esch-Uelzecht
Elektrizitéitswierk	Luxembourg edition (2000)									Zousazsteier
Esplanade; Dikrech	Luxembourg edition (2000)									Boulevard Royal; Lëtzebuerg
Am Prisong; Nëmmen op Besuch	Tréiererstrooss; Nidderaanven	Rue du Village; Jonglënster	Ereegnesfeld	Route d'Arlon	Luxembourgeois (CFL)	Akommessteier	GrandRue; Wolz	Gemeinschaftsfeld	Op der Maartplaatz; Iechternach	Go

Game description: Luxembourg Edition - (Editioun Lëtzebuerg). The street names are taken from various Luxembourgish cities. The highlighted name in each case is the name of the city.

== Malta ==
Malta (and Gozo) Edition (2008)

Tipparkja B'Xejn	Il-Mellieħa €220	Ix-Xorti (Chance)	Ħal Għargħur €220	In-Nadur €240	Ix-Xatt tal-Kottonera €200	San Ġiljan €260	Tas-Sliema €260	Tal-Ilma €150	Ħal Balzan €280	Mur Il-Ħabs
Il-Birgu €200	Malta (and Gozo) Edition (2008)									Portomaso €300
Ħaż-Żebbuġ €180	Malta (and Gozo) Edition (2008)									Tigné €300
Is-Senduq (C.Chest)	Malta (and Gozo) Edition (2008)									Is-Senduq (C.Chest)
Victoria €180	Malta (and Gozo) Edition (2008)									Il-Wardija €320
Ix-Xatt tal-Belt €200	Malta (and Gozo) Edition (2008)									Il-Port il-Kbir €200
In-Naxxar €160	Malta (and Gozo) Edition (2008)									Ix-Xorti (Chance)
Birkirkara €140	Malta (and Gozo) Edition (2008)									Valletta €350
Tad-Dawl €150	Malta (and Gozo) Edition (2008)									Depożitu Fil-Bank (€100)
Il-Mosta €140	Malta (and Gozo) Edition (2008)									L-Imdina €400
Il-Ħabbs	Marsaxlokk €120	Ħal Qormi €100	Ix-Xorti (Chance)	Marsaskala €100	Il-Port Tal-Imġarr €200	Taxxa Interna (€200)	Ħaż-Żabbar €60	Is-Senduq (C.Chest)	L-Imsida €60	IBDA €200

Game description: Released in late 2008, Monopoly Malta uses 20 Maltese and 2 Gozitan towns and uses the Euro as currency. Since Malta doesn't have train stations, Sea Ports have been used instead - three from Malta and one from Gozo. Brown: Msida, Ħaż-Żabbar; Light Blue: Marsaskala, Ħal Qormi, Marsaxlokk, Pink: Mosta, Green: Wardija, Purple: Valletta, Mdina

== Netherlands ==
Dutch (1941)

Vrij Parkeren	A-Kerkhof	Kans	Groote Markt	Heerestraat	Station Noord	Spui	Plein	Waterleiding	Lange Poten	Naar De Gevangenis
Vreeburg	Dutch (1941)									Hofplein
Biltstraat	Dutch (1941)									Blaak
Algemeen Fonds	Dutch (1941)									Algemeen Fonds
Neude	Dutch (1941)									Coolsingel
Station West	Dutch (1941)									Station Oost
Houtstraat	Dutch (1941)									Kans
Zijlweg	Dutch (1941)									Leidschestraat
Electriciteits Bedrijf	Dutch (1941)									Extra Belasting
Barteljorisstraat	Dutch (1941)									Kalverstraat
Gevangenis	Velperplein	Ketelstraat	Kans	Steenstraat	Station Zuid	Inkomsten Belasting	Brink	Algemeen Fonds	Dorpstraat	Af of Start

Netherlands Edition - Every color group is a city; from inexpensive to expensive: Ons Dorp (='our village') (Dorpsstraat, Brink), Arnhem (Velperplein, Ketelstraat, Steenstraat), Haarlem (Barteljorisstraat, Zijlweg, Grote & Kleine Houtstraat), Utrecht (Neude, Vreeburg, Biltstraat) Groningen (A Kerkhof, Grote Markt, Heerestraat), The Hague (Spui, Plein, Lange Poten), Rotterdam (Hofplein, Blaak, Coolsingel), Amsterdam (Leidsestraat, Kalverstraat).

Amsterdam Edition

Breda Edition

Eindhoven Edition (2012)

Frisian edition Edition

The Hague Edition

Harlingen edition (28 nov 2020)

Hoeksche Waard Edition

Haarlem Edition

Maastricht Edition

Nieuwegein Edition

Nijmegen Edition

Rotterdam Edition

Utrecht Edition

Gouda Edition

Elburg Edition

== Norway ==
Norwegian (Oslo) edition

Gratis Parkering	Bygdøy Allé	Sjanse	Skarpsno	Slemdal	Grorud stasjon	Karl Johans gate	Stortorget	Vannverket	Torggata	De settes i fengsel
Ringgata	Norwegian (Oslo) edition									Trosterudveien
Gabels Gate	Norwegian (Oslo) edition									Pilestredet
Prøv Lykken	Norwegian (Oslo) edition									Prøv Lykken
Grensen	Norwegian (Oslo) edition									Sinsen
Skøyen stasjon	Norwegian (Oslo) edition									Bryn stasjon
Nobels Gate	Norwegian (Oslo) edition									Sjanse
Trondheimsveien	Norwegian (Oslo) edition									Ullevål Hageby
Oslo Lysverker	Norwegian (Oslo) edition									Luksusskatt
Nedre Slottsgate	Norwegian (Oslo) edition									Rådhusplassen
Fengsel	Øvre Slottsgate	Prinsens Gate	Sjanse	Kongens gate	Oslo S.	Inntektsskatt	Kirkeveien	Prøv Lykken	Parkveien	Start (kr 2000)

Game description: Known as Monopol.

== Poland ==
Poland edition (1985)

Bezpłatny parking	Mickiewicza	Szansa	Słowackiego	Plac Wilsona	Dworzec Wschodni	Świętokrzyska	Krakowskie Przedmieście	Wodociągi	Nowy Świat	Idź do więzienia
Wolska	Poland edition (1985)									Plac Trzech Krzyży
Górczewska	Poland edition (1985)									Marszałkowska
Kasa społeczna	Poland edition (1985)									Kasa społeczna
Obozowa	Poland edition (1985)									Aleje Jerozolimskie
Dworzec Gdański	Poland edition (1985)									Dworzec Centralny
Grochowska	Poland edition (1985)									Szansa
Marsa	Poland edition (1985)									Belwederska
Elektrownia	Poland edition (1985)									Domiar podatkowy
Płowiecka	Poland edition (1985)									Aleje Ujazdowskie
Więzienie	Targowa	Jagiellońska	Szansa	Radzymińska	Dworzec Zachodni	Podatek dochodowy	Stalowa	Kasa społeczna	Konopacka	Start

Game description: Properties are streets in Warsaw.

Gdańsk Edition

Gdynia Edition (2020)

Kraków Edition (2015)

Wrocław Edition

== Portugal ==
Portuguese edition

Issued through: Majora

Estacionamento Livre	Rua de Santa Catarina (Porto)	Sorte	Rua do Carmo (Lisbon)	Av. Marechal Gomes da Costa	Estação de São Bento (Porto)	Rua de Sto. António (Porto)	Rua Garrett (Lisbon)	Companhia das Águas	Avenida dos Aliados (Porto)	Vá para a cadeia
Rua de Sá da Bandeira (Porto)	Portuguese edition									Avenida da Liberdade (Lisbon)
Avenida da República (Lisbon)	Portuguese edition									Praça da Liberdade (Porto)
Caixa da Comunidade	Portuguese edition									Caixa da Comunidade
Avenida da Boavista (Porto)	Portuguese edition									Rua do Ouro (Lisbon)
Estação de Campanhã (Porto)	Portuguese edition									Estação de Santa Apolónia (Lisbon)
Avenida de Roma (Lisbon)	Portuguese edition									Sorte
Rua Ferreira Borges (Coimbra)	Portuguese edition									Rua Augusta (Lisbon)
Companhia da Electricidade	Portuguese edition									Taxa de Luxo
Avenida dos Combatentes (Braga)	Portuguese edition									Rossio (Lisbon)
Cadeia	Avenida 24 de Julho (Lisbon)	Avenida Luísa Todi (Setúbal)	Sorte	Avenida Almirante Reis (Lisbon)	Estação do Rossio	Pague imposto sobre a renda	Avenida Fernão de Magalhães (Porto)	Caixa da Comunidade	Campo Grande (Lisbon)	Partida. Receba 2000$00

Game description: The standard version depicts major streets from cities across the country, including Lisbon, Porto, Coimbra, Setúbal and Braga. It was originally named Monopólio (literally, Monopoly in English); after Parker forced Majora (the licensed manufacturer) change the name, it became as its original.

== Romania ==
Bucharest Edition - Produced by Hasbro in 2005. The most expensive property is Bulevardul Primăverii (Spring Avenue) and the cheapest is Rahova.

== Russia ==
Known as: МОНОПОЛИЯ. Special limited edition - Moscow. At the start of the 1990s an edition called Manager was produced, featuring different factories of Leningrad.

Russia (Moscow) Edition

Copyright date: 1997	Released by: Parker Brothers/Hasbro

Besplatnaya stoyanka	Ulitsa Gorkogo	Shans (Chance)	Pushkinskaya ulitsa	Ploshch. Mayakovskogo	Kazanskaya zheleznaya doroga	Ulitsa Gruzinsky val	Ulitsa Chyajkovskogo	Vodoprovod (Water Works)	Smolenskaya Ploshchad	Otpravlyajtes v tyurmu
Rublevskoe shosse	Russia (Moscow) Edition									Ulitsa Shchyuseva
ulitsa Vavilova	Russia (Moscow) Edition									Gogolevsky bulvar
Obshchestvennaya kazna (C.Chest)	Russia (Moscow) Edition									Obshchestvennaya kazna (C.Chest)
Ryazansky prospekt	Russia (Moscow) Edition									Kutuzovsky prospekt
Kurskaya zheleznaya doroga	Russia (Moscow) Edition									Leningradskaya zheleznaya doroga
Rostovskaya nab.	Russia (Moscow) Edition									Shans (Chance)
Sretenka	Russia (Moscow) Edition									Malaya Bronnaya
Elektrostantsiya (Electric Company)	Russia (Moscow) Edition									Sverkhnalog
Ulitsa Polyanka	Russia (Moscow) Edition									Arbat
V tyurme	Pervaya Parkovaya ulitsa	Ulitsa Ogareva	Shans (Chance)	Varshchavskoe shchosse	Rizhskaya zheleznaya doroga	Podokhodny nalog	Nagatinskaya ulitsa	Obshchestvennaya kazna (C.Chest)	Mytnaya ulitsa	VPERYOD; 200,000 Rubles

Game description: Ulitsa = street. Bulvar = boulevard. Ploshchad = square. Shosse = highroad, so larger than ulitsa. Zheleznaya doroga = railway.
Other features: Go was START! in 1988 edition.

== Serbia ==
Prior to being released, the Serbian public was asked to nominate names for spaces. Monopoly Srbija was first released in 2015.

Serbia (Belgrade) Edition

Released by: Parker Brothers/Hasbro

Slobodan parking	Sava Centar €220	Prilika (Chance)	Fontana €220	Gardoš €240	Niška železnička stanica €200	Terazijska česma €260	Kalemegdan €260	Vodovod €150	Studentski trg €280	Idi u zatvor
Cvijićeva €200	Serbia (Belgrade) Edition									Bulevar mira €300
Takovska €180	Serbia (Belgrade) Edition									Svetosavska ulica €300
Gradska blagajna (C.Chest)	Serbia (Belgrade) Edition									Gradska blagajna (C.Chest)
Bulevar kralja Aleksandra €180	Serbia (Belgrade) Edition									Slavija €320
Novosadska železnička stanica €200	Serbia (Belgrade) Edition									Beogradski aerodrom €200
Ada Ciganlija €160	Serbia (Belgrade) Edition									Prilika (Chance)
Bulevar vojvode Mišića €140	Serbia (Belgrade) Edition									Knez Mihailova €350
EPS €150	Serbia (Belgrade) Edition									Porez (Plati €100)
Beogradski sajam €140	Serbia (Belgrade) Edition									Kralja Milana €400
Zatvor / U poseti	Beogradska Arena €120	Ulica narodnih heroja €100	Prilika (Chance)	Savski blokovi €100	Glavna železnička stanica €200	Porez (Plati €200)	Ulica Vojislava Ilića €60	Gradska blagajna (C.Chest)	Ustanička ulica €60	Kreni (200 €)

There is a second rendition of Monopoly with Serbian motifs, called "Čudesna Srbija" (Wonderous Serbia).

Wonderous Serbia

Released by: Parker Brothers/Hasbro

Besplatno parkiranje	Nacionalni park Tara ₩220	Šansa (Chance)	Nacionalni park Đerdap ₩220	Meandri Uvca ₩240	Žiča ₩200	Vinča ₩260	Viminacijum ₩260	Muzej Nikole Tesle ₩150	Gamzigrad ₩280	Idi u zatvor
Avala ₩200	Wonderous Serbia									Golubački grad ₩300
Kopaonik ₩180	Wonderous Serbia									Petrovaradinska tvrđava ₩300
Iznenađenje (C.Chest)	Wonderous Serbia									Iznenađenje (C.Chest)
Rtanj ₩180	Wonderous Serbia									Kalemegdan ₩320
Studenica ₩200	Wonderous Serbia									Sopoćani ₩200
Krupajsko vrelo ₩160	Wonderous Serbia									Šansa (Chance)
Veliki buk ₩140	Wonderous Serbia									Skadarlija ₩350
Narodni muzej ₩150	Wonderous Serbia									Luksuzna večera (Plati ₩100)
Deliblatska peščara ₩140	Wonderous Serbia									Knez Mihailova ₩400
U zatvoru / Samo u poseti	Vratnjanske kapije ₩120	Resavska pećina ₩100	Šansa (Chance)	Đavolja varoš ₩100	Manasija ₩200	Karte za koncert u Areni (Plati ₩200)	Mećavnik ₩60	Iznenađenje (C.Chest)	Kućica na Drini ₩60	Idi (200 ₩)

Game description: The board features Serbian landmarks instead of streets, and monasteries instead of train stations.
Tokens: Scottie, Hazel, Battleship, Top Hat, Thimble, Race Car, Wheelbarrow, Shoe.

== Slovakia ==
Bratislava

== Spain ==
Barcelona, Murcia, Vigo, Seville, Málaga, Bilbao, Valencia, Zaragoza, Ibiza and Palma de Mallorca editions. The 70th anniversary edition includes the capital cities of the autonomous communities instead of streets. There is also an edition about the Spain national football team.

Madrid Edition

Released by: Parker Brothers

Parking Gratuito	Avenida de América	Suerte	Calle María de Molina	Calle Cea Bermúdez	Estación del Mediodía	Avenida de los Reyes Católicos	Calle Bailén	Compañía de aguas	Plaza de España	Ve a la Cárcel
Calle Serrano	Madrid Edition									Puerta del Sol
Calle Velázquez	Madrid Edition									Calle Alcalá
Caja de Comunidad	Madrid Edition									Caja de Comunidad
Avenida Felipe II	Madrid Edition									Gran Vía
Estación de las Delicias	Madrid Edition									Estación del Norte
Calle Fuencarral	Madrid Edition									Suerte
Calle Alberto Aguilera	Madrid Edition									Paseo de la Castellana
Compañía de electricidad	Madrid Edition									Impuesto de lujo
Glorieta de Bilbao	Madrid Edition									Paseo del Prado
Cárcel/ Sólo visitas	Calle Bravo Murillo	Avenida Reina Victoria	Suerte	Glorieta Cuatro Caminos	Estación de Goya	Impuesto sobre el capital	Plaza Lavapiés	Caja de Comunidad	Ronda de Valencia	Salida (cobra 200€)

Catalan Edition (Barcelona)

Pàrquing gratuït	Plaça d'Urquinaona	Sort	Carrer de Fontanella	Ronda de Sant Pere	Estació de França	Les Rambles	Carrer de Pau Claris	Companyia d'aigües	Plaça de Catalunya	Ves a la Presó
Carrer d'Aragó	Catalan Edition (Barcelona)									Avinguda Portal de L'Àngel
Carrer de la Diputació	Catalan Edition (Barcelona)									Carrer de Pelai
Caixa de Comunitat	Catalan Edition (Barcelona)									Caixa de Comunitat
Passeig de Sant Joan	Catalan Edition (Barcelona)									Via Augusta
Baixador del Passeig de Gràcia	Catalan Edition (Barcelona)									Estació de Sants
Avinguda Josep Tarradellas	Catalan Edition (Barcelona)									Sort
Carrer d'Aribau	Catalan Edition (Barcelona)									Carrer de Balmes
Companyia d'electricitat	Catalan Edition (Barcelona)									Impost de Luxe
Carrer de Muntaner	Catalan Edition (Barcelona)									Passeig de Gràcia
Presó/ Només Visites	Carrer del Consell de Cent	Carrer Comte d'Urgell	Sort	Carrer de la Marina	Estació FF.CC.	Impost sobre el Capital	Carrer de Rosselló	Caixa de Comunitat	Carrer de Roger de Llúria	Sortida (cobra 200€)

== Sweden ==
Swedish Edition

Fri Parkering	Strandvägen	Chans	Kungsträdgårdsgatan	Hamngatan	Centralstationen	Vasagatan	Kungsgatan	Vattenverket	Stureplan	Gå i Fängelse
Narvavägen	Swedish Edition									Gustav Adolfs Torg
Karlavägen	Swedish Edition									Drottninggatan
Allmänning	Swedish Edition									Allmänning
Sturegatan	Swedish Edition									Diplomatstaden
Östra Station	Swedish Edition									Norra Station
Valhallavägen	Swedish Edition									Chans
Odengatan	Swedish Edition									Centrum
Elverket	Swedish Edition									Lyxskatt
St Eriksgatan	Swedish Edition									Norrmalmstorg
Fängelse	Ringvägen	Götgatan	Chans	Folkungagatan	Södra Station	Inkomstskatt	Hornsgatan	Allmänning	Västerlånggatan	.

Stockholm Edition

Gothenburg Edition

Fri Parkering	Götaplatsen	Chans	Kungsportsplatsen	Gustaf Adolfs torg	Göteborgs Hamn	Svenska Mässan	Liseberg	Göteborg Vatten	Ullevi	Gå i Fängelse
Operan	Gothenburg Edition									Kungsgatan
Universeum	Gothenburg Edition									Fredsgatan
Allmänning	Gothenburg Edition									Allmänning
Kronhuset	Gothenburg Edition									Nordstan
Landvetter Flygplats	Gothenburg Edition									Brunnsparken
Nygamla Ullevi	Gothenburg Edition									Chans
Scandinavium	Gothenburg Edition									Linnégatan
Göteborg Energi	Gothenburg Edition									Lyxskatt
Heden	Gothenburg Edition									Kungsportsavenyn
Fängelse	Saluhallen	Palmhuset	Chans	Feskekôrkan	Centralstationen	Inkomstskatt	Vasagatan	Allmänning	Haga Nygata	.

== Switzerland ==
Swiss Edition

Freier Parkplatz; Parc gratuit	Winterthur; Bahnhofplatz	Chance	St. Gallen; Marktplatz	Bern; Bundesplatz	Überlandbahnen; Tramways interurbains	Luzern; Weggisgasse	Zurich; Rennweg	Wasserwerke; Usines hydrauliques	Lausanne; Rue De Bourg	Gehen ins Gefängnis! Va en prison
La Chaux-De-Fonds; Ave. L.-Robert	Swiss Edition									Basel; Freie Strasse
Freiburg/Fribourg; Bahnhofstraße/Avenue de la Gare	Swiss Edition									Genève; Rue De La Croix-D'Or
Kanzlei; Chancellerie	Swiss Edition									Kanzlei; Chancellerie
Biel/Bienne; Nidaugasse/Rue de Nidau	Swiss Edition									Bern; Spitalgasse
Vereinigte Bergbahnen AG; Funiculaires réunis SA	Swiss Edition									Vereinigte Schwebebahnen; Association des Téléphériques
Lugano; Via Nassa	Swiss Edition									Chance
Solothurn; Hauptgasse	Swiss Edition									Lausanne; Place St. François
Elektrizitats-Werke; Usines électriques	Swiss Edition									Nachsteuer; Impôt supplémentaire
Basel; Steinen-Vorstadt	Swiss Edition									Zürich; Paradeplatz
Im Gefängnis; En prison	Thun; Hauptgasse	Neuchâtel; Place Purry	Chance	Aarau; Rathausplatz	Vereinigte Privatbahnen; Union des chemins de fer privés	Einkommensteuer; Impôt sur le revenu	Schaffhausen; Vordergaße	Kanzlei; Chancellerie	Chur; Kornplatz	Start

Game description: This edition presents streets and squares from around the country. Cities featured: Aarau, Basel, Bern, Bienne, La Chaux-de-Fonds, Chur, Fribourg, Geneva, Lausanne, Lucerne, Lugano, Neuchâtel, St. Gallen, Schaffhausen, Solothurn, Thun, Winterthur, Zürich. The Swiss edition is bilingual German/French (with rules also printed in Italian).

Geneva Edition

== Turkey ==
Turkey (Istanbul) Edition

Released by: Parker Brothers/Hasbro

Ücretsiz otopark	Caddebostan		Bağdat Avenue	Bostancı	Kabataş Vapur İskelesi Deniz Yolları	Nişantaşı	Teşvikiye	Sular idaresi	Maçka	Kodes'e gir
Mecidiyeköy	Turkey (Istanbul) Edition									Levent
Şişli	Turkey (Istanbul) Edition									Etiler
Harbiye	Turkey (Istanbul) Edition									Bebek
Kadıköy Vapur İskelesi Deniz Yolları	Turkey (Istanbul) Edition									Sirkeci Tren istasyonu TCDD
Beşiktaş	Turkey (Istanbul) Edition
Taksim	Turkey (Istanbul) Edition									Tarabya
Elektrik idaresi	Turkey (Istanbul) Edition
Beyoğlu	Turkey (Istanbul) Edition									Yeniköy
Kodes ziyaretçi	Sirkeci	Karaköy		Sultanahmet	Haydarpaşa tren istasyonu TCDD		Dolapdere		Kasımpaşa	Başlangıç

Game description: Streets and properties are named after Istanbul neighborhoods.

== United Kingdom ==
London (standard edition) (1935)

Copyright date: 2011

Free Parking	Strand £220	Chance	Fleet Street £220	Trafalgar Square £240	Fenchurch Street Station £200	Leicester Square £260	Coventry Street £260	Water Works £150	Piccadilly £280	Go to Jail
Vine Street £200	London (standard edition) (1935)									Regent Street £300
Marlborough Street £180	London (standard edition) (1935)									Oxford Street £300
Community Chest	London (standard edition) (1935)									Community Chest
Bow Street £180	London (standard edition) (1935)									Bond Street £320
Marylebone Station £200	London (standard edition) (1935)									Liverpool Street Station £200
Northumberland Avenue £160	London (standard edition) (1935)									Chance
Whitehall £140	London (standard edition) (1935)									Park Lane £350
Electric Company £150	London (standard edition) (1935)									Super Tax (pay £100)
Pall Mall £140	London (standard edition) (1935)									Mayfair £400
In Jail/Just Visiting	Pentonville Road £120	Euston Road £100	Chance	The Angel Islington £100	King's Cross Station £200	Income Tax (pay £200)	Whitechapel Road £60	Community Chest	Old Kent Road £60	Go (collect £200)

Tokens: dog, top hat, wheel barrow, race car, boot, iron, battleship, thimble

London (60th anniversary edition) (1995)

Copyright date: 1995

Free Parking	Strand £220	Chance	Fleet Street £220	Trafalgar Square £240	Fenchurch Street station £200	Leicester Square £260	Coventry Street £260	Water Works £150	Piccadilly £280	Go To Jail
Vine Street £200	London (60th anniversary edition) (1995)									Regent Street £300
Marlborough Street £180	London (60th anniversary edition) (1995)									Oxford Street £300
Community Chest	London (60th anniversary edition) (1995)									Community Chest
Bow Street £180	London (60th anniversary edition) (1995)									Bond Street £320
Marylebone station £200	London (60th anniversary edition) (1995)									Liverpool Street station £200
Northumberland Avenue £160	London (60th anniversary edition) (1995)									Chance
Whitehall £140	London (60th anniversary edition) (1995)									Park Lane £350
Electric Company £150	London (60th anniversary edition) (1995)									Super Tax (pay £100)
Pall Mall £140	London (60th anniversary edition) (1995)									Mayfair £400
In Jail/Just Visiting	Pentonville Road £120	Euston Road £100	Chance	The Angel Islington £100	King's Cross station £200	Income Tax (pay £200)	Whitechapel £60	Community Chest	Old Kent Road £60	Go (collect £200)

Game description: Released as limited edition for the 60th anniversary of Monopoly. Each set is individually numbered and the box is gold with a green bar across the centre.
Tokens: Elephant, Bathtub, Trophy, Candlestick, Tram, Rich Uncle Pennybags, Boot and Car

London (Millennium edition) (1999)

Copyright date: 1999

Free Parking	Strand £220	Chance	Fleet Street £220	Trafalgar Square £240	Fenchurch Street Station £200	Leicester Square £260	Coventry Street £260	Water Works £150	Piccadilly £280	Go To Jail
Vine Street £200	London (Millennium edition) (1999)									Regent Street £300
Marlborough Street £180	London (Millennium edition) (1999)									Oxford Street £300
Community Chest	London (Millennium edition) (1999)									Community Chest
Bow Street £180	London (Millennium edition) (1999)									Bond Street £320
Marylebone Station £200	London (Millennium edition) (1999)									Liverpool Street Station £200
Northumberland Avenue £160	London (Millennium edition) (1999)									Chance
Whitehall £140	London (Millennium edition) (1999)									Park Lane £350
Electric Company £150	London (Millennium edition) (1999)									Super Tax (pay £100)
Pall Mall £140	London (Millennium edition) (1999)									Mayfair £400
In Jail/Just Visiting	Pentonville Road £120	Euston Road £100	Chance	The Angel Islington £100	King's Cross Station £200	Income Tax (pay £200)	Whitechapel £60	Community Chest	Old Kent Road £60	Go (collect £200)

Game description: Produced for the millennium in 1999, the properties are the same as the standard British edition. The houses and hotels are stackable, the board is silver with holographic foil, and the money is translucent.
Tokens: Mobile Phone, Aeroplane, Car, Bike, Computer, Dog, Globe, In-line Skate

UK Here & Now edition (2007)

Copyright date: 2007	Released by: Hasbro

Free Parking	Dundee	Chance	Keele	Norwich	Fenchurch Street Station	Birmingham	Oxford	Water Works	Stoke-on-Trent	Go To Jail
Lincoln	UK Here & Now edition (2007)									Sheffield
Plymouth	UK Here & Now edition (2007)									Cambridge
Community Chest	UK Here & Now edition (2007)									Community Chest
Derby	UK Here & Now edition (2007)									Nottingham
Marylebone Station	UK Here & Now edition (2007)									Liverpool Street Station
London	UK Here & Now edition (2007)									Chance
Manchester	UK Here & Now edition (2007)									Exeter
Electric Company	UK Here & Now edition (2007)									Super Tax
Colchester	UK Here & Now edition (2007)									St Albans
Jail	York	Cardiff	Chance	Middlesbrough	King's Cross Station	Income Tax	Leeds	Community Chest	Liverpool	Go

Game description: The properties are all UK towns and cities, with the order defined by an online voting campaign that received over a million votes.
Tokens: Mobile phone, Roller blade, Hamburger, Jumbo Jet, Racing Car, Skateboard and London Bus

Olympic Games Edition (London 2012) (2011)

Copyright date: 2011	Released by: Hasbro	Issued through: Winning Moves UK (Manufactured and distributed in the UK by Winning Moves UK Ltd, London W2 1NJ.)

Free Parking	ExCeL London; M220	Heats	North Greenwich Arena; M220	The Royal Artillery Barracks; M240	Stratford; M200	Hampton Court Palace; M260	Greenwich Park; M260	International Broadcast Centre; M150	Hyde Park; M280	Go To Jail
Velodrome; M200	Olympic Games Edition (London 2012) (2011)									Wembley; M300
BMX Track; M180	Olympic Games Edition (London 2012) (2011)									Wimbledon; M300
Finals	Olympic Games Edition (London 2012) (2011)									Finals
Hadleigh Farm; M180	Olympic Games Edition (London 2012) (2011)									Lord’s; M320
St Pancras International; M200	Olympic Games Edition (London 2012) (2011)									Stratford International; M200
Eton Dorney; M160	Olympic Games Edition (London 2012) (2011)									Heats
Lee Valley White Water Centre; M140	Olympic Games Edition (London 2012) (2011)									Aquatics Centre; M350
Olympic Park Energy Centre; M150	Olympic Games Edition (London 2012) (2011)									Ticketing; Pay M100
Weymouth and Portland; M140	Olympic Games Edition (London 2012) (2011)									Olympic Stadium; M400
In Jail/Just Visiting	Basketball Arena; M120	Hockey Centre; M100	Heats	Handbal Arena; M100	Heathrow Airport station M200	Merchandise; Pay M200	Horse Guards Parade; M60	Finals	Earls Court; M60	Collect; M 200 Salary as you pass Go

Tokens: Double-decker bus, Wenlock, Mandeville, Hackney carriage, London Underground train, Telephone booth
Other features: You are buying London 2012 venues and locations.
Stands and Stadia instead of Houses and Hotels.

=== England ===
1999 Rugby World Cup (1999)

Butlins 80th anniversary (2016)

Coronation Street Edition

Desi (2005)

Marshalls Natural Stone Paving (2010) - "We've Paved the Monopoly Board" - Limited edition of 250 sets manufactured for Marshalls Natural Stone Paving. Each traditional Monopoly street shows a photograph and the name of a Marshalls paving product actually laid in that street in London.

Premier League 1999/2000 (1999)

Premier League 2000/2001 (2000)

Howard DeWalden Estate

Mega Edition (2007)

Home Bargains (2020)

Poundland (2021)

Stock Exchange

Copyright date: 2001	Released by: Waddingtons/Hasbro	Issued through: General release in the United Kingdom.

Game description: Thirty companies were represented on the board, with twenty-two presidency cards (in place of the usual street properties), four retail cards (in place of the railroads/railway stations), and two utilities. Community Chest and Chance were replaced by Bull and Bear cards, respectively. The UK standard Super Tax space became a Capital Gains Tax space, though the Income Tax space remained unchanged (except for value - values of all spaces, including the tax spaces, were multiplied by millions of Pounds). The companies represented on the board were international, including Gillette, Unilever, Swissair, Pizza Hut, Daimler Chrysler, Toshiba, Alcatel, Tesco and BT.
Tokens: Six standard Monopoly tokens were included: the racecar, iron, Scottie dog, battleship, hat and shoe.
Other features: Rules for the game were widely changed for this edition. The doubles rule (taking an extra turn, or going to jail after three consecutive doubles rolls) remained, as did the auction rule (a space, when landed on, if not purchased by the player whose token landed on it, would be auctioned by the bank). Landing on a coloured company space allowed the player to buy a majority of shares if it hadn't already been floated, or pay rent, which went to the bank, and not the player possessing the card. Extra shares could also be purchased during a turn: one share of any floated company, or two of the company that the player's token is on. Dividends (a minimum of £200 million, plus accumulated rents) were collected each time a player passed Go. The construction of offices/head offices (in place of houses and hotels) could only commence when all companies in a colour-group were owned, similar to standard rules, and building shortages, also as in standard rules, could also be caused. Shares of companies (up to 9 per company) could be bought from and sold to the bank, or traded with other players. If a shareholding plurality is achieved by another player, that player assumes control of the company, which could break a monopoly. All transactions were intended to be entered into the included Electronic Share Unit.

Thomas Cook (2005)

==== Towns and Cities ====
Bath (2007)

Birmingham (1998, 1999, 2000, 2004, 2005)

Copyright date: 1998

Free Parking	Atherstone £220	Chance	Union Street £220	Coventry Road £240	Corporation Street bus stops £200	Broad Street £260	Hagley Road £260	Cable & Wireless £150	New Street £280	Go To Jail
Cannon Street £200	Birmingham (1998, 1999, 2000, 2004, 2005)									Printing House Street £300
Halesowen £180	Birmingham (1998, 1999, 2000, 2004, 2005)									Newhall Street £300
Community Chest	Birmingham (1998, 1999, 2000, 2004, 2005)									Community Chest
New Bull Ring £180	Birmingham (1998, 1999, 2000, 2004, 2005)									Waterloo Street £320
New Street station £200	Birmingham (1998, 1999, 2000, 2004, 2005)									Snow Hill station £200
Villa Park £160	Birmingham (1998, 1999, 2000, 2004, 2005)									Chance
NEC Arena £140	Birmingham (1998, 1999, 2000, 2004, 2005)									Bickenhill £350
East Midlands Electricity £150	Birmingham (1998, 1999, 2000, 2004, 2005)									Luxury Tax (pay £100)
Edgbaston £140	Birmingham (1998, 1999, 2000, 2004, 2005)									Hurst Street £400
In Jail/Just Visiting	Centenary Square £120	Victoria Square £100	Chance	The NEC £100	Moor Street Information Centre £200	Income Tax (pay £200)	Bannerley Road £60	Community Chest	Dominion Court £60	Go (collect £200)

University of Birmingham (limited edition 2003)

Black Country (2019)

Blackpool (2010)

Bournemouth & Poole (2007)

Brighton & Hove (2003)

Bristol (2000, 2001, 2004, 2007)

Free Parking	Cribbs Causeway	Chance	Denmark Street	Harbourside	Bristol Port	TV Centre Bath Road	Bristol Cathedral	Communications (Orange)	University of Bristol	Go To Jail
Lewin's Mead	Bristol (2000, 2001, 2004, 2007)									Somerset House
Broadmead	Bristol (2000, 2001, 2004, 2007)									Aztec West
Community Chest	Bristol (2000, 2001, 2004, 2007)									Community Chest
King Street	Bristol (2000, 2001, 2004, 2007)									Narrow Quay
Centre (First City Line)	Bristol (2000, 2001, 2004, 2007)									Bristol Temple Meads
County Ground	Bristol (2000, 2001, 2004, 2007)									Chance
Ashton Gate	Bristol (2000, 2001, 2004, 2007)									Bristol Old Vic
Water Company (Bristol Water)	Bristol (2000, 2001, 2004, 2007)									Luxury Tax
The Memorial Stadium	Bristol (2000, 2001, 2004, 2007)									Anchor Road
Jail	Clifton Suspension Bridge	Bristol Zoo Gardens	Chance	Great Western Dock (SS Great Britain)	International Airport Bristol	Income Tax	St Andrews Road	Community Chest	Temple Street	Go

Cambridge (2004)

Copyright date: 2004	Released by: Parker

Free Parking	St Edward's Passage	Chance	Duxford	Sidney Street	The Backs	??	Betjeman House	??	Newmarket Road	Go To Jail
Castle Mound	Cambridge (2004)									Fenner's
Rose Crescent	Cambridge (2004)									Wheeler Street
Community Chest	Cambridge (2004)									Community Chest
Market Square	Cambridge (2004)									University of Cambridge
Cambridge station	Cambridge (2004)									Drummer Street bus station
Abbey Stadium	Cambridge (2004)									Chance
Grantchester Road	Cambridge (2004)									Fitzwilliam Museum
??	Cambridge (2004)									Building Society Deposit
Milton Road	Cambridge (2004)									King's College Chapel
Jail	Bateman Street	Cheddars Lane	Chance	Hills Road	Cambridge Airport	Income Tax	Parkers Piece	Community Chest	Histon Road	Go

Carlisle (2007)

Chester & Cheshire (2001)

Free Parking	Watergate Street, Chester (Cheshire Cat Purrductions)	Chance	High Street, Crewe (Chronicle Newspapers)	Alderley Edge	Crewe station	Jodrell Bank Observatory	Mersey Road, Widnes (Catalyst Science Discovery Centre)	Water Works	Bridge Street, Chester (Grosvenor)	Go To Jail
Tatton Park	Chester & Cheshire (2001)									Roe Street, Macclesfield (Heritage Centre)
Lyme Park	Chester & Cheshire (2001)									Ellesmere Port (Vauxhall)
Community Chest	Chester & Cheshire (2001)									Community Chest
Whitchurch Road, Nantwich (Hack Green Secret Nuclear Bunker)	Chester & Cheshire (2001)									Alderley Road, Wilmslow (Royal London)
Wilmslow station	Chester & Cheshire (2001)									Stockport station
Heywood Road, Sale (Sale Sharks)	Chester & Cheshire (2001)									Chance
Oulton Park	Chester & Cheshire (2001)									Eastgate, Chester (The Chester Grosvenor)
Telecommunications (One.Tel)	Chester & Cheshire (2001)									Luxury Tax
Chester Racecourse	Chester & Cheshire (2001)									Chester Cathedral
Jail	Chester Zoo	Chester Amphitheatre Trust	Chance	Quarry Bank Mill	Chester station	Income Tax	Risley Biffa	Community Chest	Wrexham Road, Chester (Grosvenor Garden Centre)	Go

Coventry (2002/2021)

Chelmsford (2012)

East Grinstead (2007)

Exeter (2015)

Falmouth (2019)

Ipswich (2006)

Kingston upon Hull (2004)

Hereford (2022)

Huddersfield (announced 2018)

Hull City Football Club Edition

Lancashire Edition

Lancaster Edition (2023)

Lancaster University Edition

Leeds (1989)

Free Parking	Boar Lane	Chance	Wellington Street	City Square	Horsforth station	Vicar Lane	The Headrow	Yorkshire Water	Briggate	Go To Jail
Kirkgate	Leeds (1989)									Albion Street
The Calls	Leeds (1989)									Lands Lane
Community Chest	Leeds (1989)									Community Chest
Eastgate	Leeds (1989)									Commercial Street
Cross Gates station	Leeds (1989)									New Pudsey station
Cookridge Street	Leeds (1989)									Chance
Woodhouse Lane	Leeds (1989)									East Parade
Yorkshire Electricity	Leeds (1989)									Luxury Tax
Great George Street	Leeds (1989)									Park Row
Jail	North Street	Regent Street	Chance	Chapeltown Road	City station	Income Tax	Sheepscar	Community Chest	Burmantofts	Go

Game description: Released in limited edition of 500 for charity in 1989.

University of Leeds (2002)

Free Parking	Medical School	Chance	Mechanical Engineering	EC Stoner Building	Town Hall	Headingley Stadium	Corn Exchange	Alumni Office	Hyde Park Cinema	Go To Jail
Michael Sadler Building	University of Leeds (2002)									Leeds University Business School
Roger Stevens Building	University of Leeds (2002)									Bretton Hall Campus
Community Chest	University of Leeds (2002)									Community Chest
Geography	University of Leeds (2002)									Brotherton Library
Kirkgate Market	University of Leeds (2002)									Leeds Train station
The Union	University of Leeds (2002)									Chance
St George's Field	University of Leeds (2002)									Parkinson Building
Careers Centre	University of Leeds (2002)									Luxury Tax
Sports Centre	University of Leeds (2002)									Great Hall
Jail	The Old Bar	The Refectory	Chance	The Original Oak	Civic Hall	Income Tax	Bodington Hall	Community Chest	Henry Price Flats	Go

Lincoln(2011)

Free Parking	Lincolnshire Co-op	Chance	Lincolnshire Media	Lincolnshire Business Park	Newport Arch	Old Palace	Doubletree Hotel	Stokes Coffee Shop	White Hart	Go To Jail
Steep Hill	Lincoln(2011)									Lincoln Minster School
High Street	Lincoln(2011)									Lincoln College
Community Chest	Lincoln(2011)									Community Chest
Waterside	Lincoln(2011)									University of Lincoln
Pottergate	Lincoln(2011)									Exchequer Gate
Showground	Lincoln(2011)									Chance
Sincil Bank	Lincoln(2011)									The Castle
Elite Meats	Lincoln(2011)									Luxury Tax
Drill Hall	Lincoln(2011)									The Cathedral
Jail	Museum of Lincolnshire Life	Ellis Mill	Chance	The Collection	Stone Bow	Income Tax	Brown's Pie Shop	Community Chest	YMCA	Go

Liverpool (1999, 2000, 2007)

Free Parking	Pier Head	Chance	Sir John Moores Building	Tarleton Street	Mersey Ferry	Albert Dock	Hope Street	Communications	Mathew Street	Go To Jail
Ranlagh Street	Liverpool (1999, 2000, 2007)									Whitechapel
St John's Shopping Centre	Liverpool (1999, 2000, 2007)									Old Hall Street
Community Chest	Liverpool (1999, 2000, 2007)									Community Chest
St George's Way	Liverpool (1999, 2000, 2007)									Water Street
Liverpool Airport	Liverpool (1999, 2000, 2007)									Paradise Street bus station
Aintree Racecourse	Liverpool (1999, 2000, 2007)									Chance
Goodison Park	Liverpool (1999, 2000, 2007)									High Street
Energy Company	Liverpool (1999, 2000, 2007)									Luxury Tax
Anfield	Liverpool (1999, 2000, 2007)									Royal Liver Building
Jail	Britannia Vaults	Lime Street	Chance	William Brown Street	Lime Street station	Income Tax	Hackins Hey	Community Chest	Wavetree Road	Go

Everton F.C. (2008)

Liverpool F.C. European Champions (2005)

Liverpool F.C. (2007)

London - Here And Now Limited Edition (2005)

Copyright date: 2005	Released by: Parker/Hasbro	Issued through: General release in the United Kingdom, Australia and New Zealand.

Free Parking	London Eye £2,200,000	Chance	Hyde Park £2,200,000	Trafalgar Square £2,400,000	Gatwick Airport £2,000,000	Tottenham Court Road £2,600,000	Covent Garden £2,600,000	The Sun £1,500,000	Regent Street £2,800,000	Go To Jail
Tate Modern £2,000,000	London - Here And Now Limited Edition (2005)									Notting Hill £3,000,000
Natural History Museum £1,800,000	London - Here And Now Limited Edition (2005)									Soho £3,000,000
Community Chest	London - Here And Now Limited Edition (2005)									Community Chest
Science Museum £1,800,000	London - Here And Now Limited Edition (2005)									Kings Road £3,200,000
Stansted Airport £2,000,000	London - Here And Now Limited Edition (2005)									Heathrow Airport £2,000,000
Wembley Stadium £1,600,000	London - Here And Now Limited Edition (2005)									Chance
Wimbledon £1,400,000	London - Here And Now Limited Edition (2005)									Canary Wharf £3,500,000
Telecoms £1,500,000	London - Here And Now Limited Edition (2005)									Super Tax (pay £750,000)
The Oval £1,400,000	London - Here And Now Limited Edition (2005)									The City £4,000,000
In Jail/Just Visiting	GMTV Studios £1,200,000	Wembley Arena £1,000,000	Chance	Hammersmith Apollo £1,000,000	London City Airport £2,000,000	Income Tax (pay £2,000,000)	Camden Market £600,000	Community Chest	Portobello Road Market £600,000	GO (collect £2,000,000)

Game description: This board was released in 2005, to honour the 70th anniversary of Parker Brothers acquisition and commencement of sales of the board game Monopoly. The concept of the game is to update the board and gameplay through inflation, use of currently valuable properties, new tokens, new artwork, use of airports in place of railroads, use of apartments in place of houses, and new scenarios on the Community Chest and Chance cards. The Electric Company was replaced with Telecoms (a tower in London), and Water Works was replaced by The Sun newspaper.
Tokens: Limited editions included a cheeseburger, inline skate, mobile phone, skateboard, Formula-1 race car, passenger jetliner and a London bus. The standard edition omitted the bus.
Other features: Trafalgar Square is the only property to have the exact same location on both the classic board and the Here & Now Edition board. Regent Street is also on both boards, but was demoted from a dark green to a yellow property, and thus draws less rent than before.

London Underground Edition - replaces streets with Underground stations, with colours matching lines

King's College London Edition (2004)

Arsenal F.C. Edition (2002, 2007)

Arsenal - Farewell to Highbury (2005)

Chelsea F.C. Edition (2001, 2004)

Fulham F.C. Edition (2009)

Tottenham Hotspur F.C. Edition

Manchester (1998, 1999, 2001)

Free Parking	Prestage Street £220	Chance	Bury New Road £220	Coronation Street £240	Manchester Airport £200	Ringway £260	Wilmslow Road £260	Communications £150	Victoria £280	Go To Jail
Arndale Centre £200	Manchester (1998, 1999, 2001)									Barbirolli Square £300
Market Street £180	Manchester (1998, 1999, 2001)									Garstang Road £300
Community Chest	Manchester (1998, 1999, 2001)									Community Chest
St Mary Street £180	Manchester (1998, 1999, 2001)									Mount Street £320
Piccadilly station £200	Manchester (1998, 1999, 2001)									Aytoun Street £200
Old Trafford £160	Manchester (1998, 1999, 2001)									Chance
Huntsbank £140	Manchester (1998, 1999, 2001)									Whitworth Park £350
Electric Company £150	Manchester (1998, 1999, 2001)									Luxury Tax (pay £100)
Storm Shelter £140	Manchester (1998, 1999, 2001)									Eastgate £400
In Jail/Just Visiting	Eastlands £120	Liverpool Road £100	Chance	Albert Square £100	Oxford Road station £200	Income Tax (pay £200)	Eccles New Road £60	Community Chest	Portland Street £60	Go (collect £200)

Manchester United F.C. (1999, 2000, 2003, 2005, 2007, 2009) Edition

Middlesbrough (2006)

Newcastle & Gateshead (1998)

Free Parking	Quayside	Chance	Eldon Square	Tyne Brewery	River Tyne (Shields Ferry)	Grainger Street	Stowell Street (China Town)	Gas Company/Market Street (Northern Electric+Gas)	New Bridge Street	Go To Jail
Leazes Park Road	Newcastle & Gateshead (1998)									Collingwood Street
The Haymarket	Newcastle & Gateshead (1998)									Mosley Street
Community Chest	Newcastle & Gateshead (1998)									Community Chest
Metro Centre	Newcastle & Gateshead (1998)									Dean Street
Newcastle Central GNER	Newcastle & Gateshead (1998)									Monument (Metro)
St James' Park	Newcastle & Gateshead (1998)									Chance
County Ground	Newcastle & Gateshead (1998)									Northumberland Street
Electric Company/Carliol House (Northern Electric+Gas)	Newcastle & Gateshead (1998)									Luxury Tax
Gateshead International Stadium	Newcastle & Gateshead (1998)									Grey Street
Jail	Tyne Bridge	Grey's Monument	Chance	Gateshead Angel	Newcastle Airport	Income Tax	Acorn Road	Community Chest	The Wills Building	Go

Newcastle & Gateshead (1999)

Free Parking	Quayside	Chance	Algernon Road	Tyne Brewery	Shields Ferry	Haymarket	Chinatown	Gas Company/Market Street (Northern Electric+Gas)	The Close, Quayside	Go To Jail
Metro Centre	Newcastle & Gateshead (1999)									Tankerville Terrace
Eldon Square	Newcastle & Gateshead (1999)									St Nicholas Chare
Community Chest	Newcastle & Gateshead (1999)									Community Chest
Grainger Street	Newcastle & Gateshead (1999)									Dean Street
Tyne Ports	Newcastle & Gateshead (1999)									Central station
St James' Park	Newcastle & Gateshead (1999)									Chance
Kingston Park	Newcastle & Gateshead (1999)									Northumberland Street
Electric Company/Carliol House (Northern Electric+Gas)	Newcastle & Gateshead (1999)									Bank Deposit
Gateshead International Stadium	Newcastle & Gateshead (1999)									Grey Street
Jail	Tyne Bridge	Grey's Monument	Chance	Angel of the North	Newcastle Airport	Income Tax	St James' Boulevard	Community Chest	Team Valley	Go

Newcastle & Gateshead (2000)

Newcastle & Gateshead (2004)

Free Parking	Fenham Barracks	Chance	Radio House	Tyne Brewery	Shields Ferry	Haymarket	Times Square	Gas Company/Market Street (Northern Electric+Gas)	Quayside	Go To Jail
Eldon Square	Newcastle & Gateshead (2004)									Tankerville Terrace
Metro Centre	Newcastle & Gateshead (2004)									St Nicholas Chare
Community Chest	Newcastle & Gateshead (2004)									Community Chest
Grainger Street	Newcastle & Gateshead (2004)									Dean Street
Central station	Newcastle & Gateshead (2004)									Port of Tyne
St James' Park	Newcastle & Gateshead (2004)									Chance
Kingston Park	Newcastle & Gateshead (2004)									Northumberland Street
Electric Company/Carliol House (Northern Electric+Gas)	Newcastle & Gateshead (2004)									Bank Deposit
Gateshead International Stadium	Newcastle & Gateshead (2004)									Grey Street
Jail	Tyne Bridge	Grey's Monument	Chance	Angel of the North	Newcastle Airport	Income Tax	Jesmond Dene	Community Chest	Birtley	Go

Newcastle United Football Club Edition (2006)

University of Newcastle Upon Tyne (2001)

Free Parking	Old Library	Chance	Percy Building	Medical School	Grey's Monument	Playhouse Theatre	Centre For Life	Alumni Association	Hatton Gallery	Go To Jail
Merz Court	University of Newcastle Upon Tyne (2001)									King George VI Building
Daysh Building	University of Newcastle Upon Tyne (2001)									Armstrong Building
Community Chest	University of Newcastle Upon Tyne (2001)									Community Chest
Claremont Tower	University of Newcastle Upon Tyne (2001)									The Quad
Tyne Bridge	University of Newcastle Upon Tyne (2001)									Central station
Close House	University of Newcastle Upon Tyne (2001)									Chance
Cochrane Park	University of Newcastle Upon Tyne (2001)									Robinson Library
Careers Service	University of Newcastle Upon Tyne (2001)									Luxury Tax
Athletic Union	University of Newcastle Upon Tyne (2001)									King's Hall
Jail	Quayside	Bigg Market	Chance	Union Society	Gateshead Angel	Income Tax	Henderson Hall	Community Chest	Castle Leazes Halls	Go

Northampton

Copyright date: 2009

Free Parking	Lodge Farm Industrial Estate (Travis Perkins) £220	Chance (BBC Northampton)	Upper Mounts (Northampton Chronicle & Echo) £220	Abington Square (Guy Salmon Jaguar Northampton) £240	River Nene £200	78 Derngate £260	Wellingborough Road £260	Water Works £150	Swan Street (Royal & Derngate) £280	Go To Jail
Grosvenor Shopping Centre £200	Northampton									Bridge Street (Carlsberg) £300
Abington Street (Watts Furnishers) £180	Northampton									Northampton College £300
Community Chest (Warwickshire and Northamptonshire Air Ambulance)	Northampton									Community Chest (Crazy Hats Breast Cancer Appeal)
LJB Rutherfords, Northampton Market £180	Northampton									Castilian Street (Tollers Solicitors) £320
Greyfriars bus station £200	Northampton									Grand Union Canal £200
Franklin's Gardens £160	Northampton									Chance (Summit)
Sixfields Stadium £140	Northampton									The Guildhall £350
Electric Company £150	Northampton									Super Tax (pay £100)
The County Ground (Northants Cricket) £140	Northampton									Althorp House £400
In Jail/Just Visiting	Guildhall Road (Northampton Museums) £120	Delapre Abbey £100	Chance (Heart 96.6)	Church of the Holy Sepulchre £100	Northampton railway station £200	Income Tax (pay £200)	Abington Park £60	Community Chest (friends of Cynthia Spencer Hospice)	National Lift Tower £60	Go (collect £200)

Norwich (2002)

Nottingham (2001, 2003, 2004)

Free Parking	Kimberley Brewery (Hardys & Hansons)	Chance	Hockley (guppi)	Long Row (Going Places)	River Trent	Brewhouse Yard	Talbot Street Rock City (venue)	Utilities (Powergen)	Wollaton Street (Moat House Hotels Nottingham Royal)	Go To Jail
Victoria Centre	Nottingham (2001, 2003, 2004)									University Boulevard (University of Nottingham)
Lower Parliament Street (National Ice Centre)	Nottingham (2001, 2003, 2004)									High Pavement (Galleries of Justice)
Community Chest	Nottingham (2001, 2003, 2004)									Community Chest
Holme Pierrepont (National Water Sports Centre)	Nottingham (2001, 2003, 2004)									Lace Market (Lace Market Centre)
Broadmarsh bus station	Nottingham (2001, 2003, 2004)									East Midlands Airport
Trent Bridge Notts	Nottingham (2001, 2003, 2004)									Chance
City Ground (Nottingham Forest FC)	Nottingham (2001, 2003, 2004)									Theatre Square (Theatre Royal, Nottingham)
Telecommunications (One.Tel)	Nottingham (2001, 2003, 2004)									Luxury Tax
Meadow Lane (Notts County FC)	Nottingham (2001, 2003, 2004)									Nottingham Castle
Jail	Council House	Wollaton Hall	Chance	Robin Hood Statue	Nottingham station (Central Trains)	Income Tax	Sherwood Forest Nottinghamshire	Community Chest	Colwick (Biffa)	Go

Oxford (2001)

Free Parking	Broad Street (Blackwell's)	Chance	Great Clarendon Street (Oxford English Dictionary)	St. Thomas' Street (Morrells of Oxford)	Folly Bridge (Salter Passenger Boats)	Walton Street (Phoenix Picture House)	High Street (QUOD)	Waste Services (Biffa)	Banbury Road (95.2fm BBC Radio Oxford)	Go To Jail
The Clarendon Centre	Oxford (2001)									Oxpens Road (Oxford College of Further Education)
Market Street (The Covered Market)	Oxford (2001)									Headington Brookes University
Community Chest	Oxford (2001)									Community Chest
Cowley (Templars Square)	Oxford (2001)									University of Oxford
Pear Tree (Park & Ride)	Oxford (2001)									Gloucester Green (Oxford Express)
Iffley Road	Oxford (2001)									Chance
The Parks	Oxford (2001)									The Randolph Hotel (Heritage Hotels)
Telecommunications (One.Tel)	Oxford (2001)									Luxury Tax
The Kassam Stadium (Oxford United FC)	Oxford (2001)									Ashmolean Museum
Jail	St Michael at the Northgate	Cornmarket	Chance	St Aldates (Museum of Oxford)	Oxford station	Income Tax	St Giles (Eagle and Child)	Community Chest	Wolvercote (The Trout)	Go

Oundle

Portsmouth

Plymouth (2011)

Reading (2003)

Scarborough (2019)

St Mawes, Cornwall March (2012)

Sheffield (2007) (limited edition)

Southampton (2004)

Southwold, Reydon & Walberswick (2012)

Free Parking	Flick & Son Estate Agents	Chance (Stella Peskett Millenium Hall)	Spots	Buckenham House	The Lighthouse	The Harbour Inn	Collen and Clare	Barclays Bank	Sutherland House	Go To Jail
Sole Bay Inn	Southwold, Reydon & Walberswick (2012)									The Crown Hotel
Spring Agency	Southwold, Reydon & Walberswick (2012)									The Swan Hotel
Community Chest (Ipswich Building Society)	Southwold, Reydon & Walberswick (2012)									Community Chest (The Adnams Charity)
Northcliffe B&B	Southwold, Reydon & Walberswick (2012)									Adnams Cellar & Kitchen Store
Water Pump	Southwold, Reydon & Walberswick (2012)									Adnams Brewery & Distillery
The Red Lion Inn	Southwold, Reydon & Walberswick (2012)									Chance
The Kings Head Inn	Southwold, Reydon & Walberswick (2012)									The Lord Nelson Inn
Southwold Town Council	Southwold, Reydon & Walberswick (2012)									Local Design Team
Fromus	Southwold, Reydon & Walberswick (2012)									Best of Suffolk
In Jail/Just Visiting	The Blyth Hotel	The Bell Inn	Chance (Walberswick Parish Council)	The Anchor Inn	Water Tower	Saint Felix School (Income Tax)	Sole Bay Bowls Club	Community Chest (Reydon Parish Council)	The Rest, Reydon Alms Houses	Go

Stoke-on-Trent

Sunderland (2004)

Taunton (2017)

Weymouth & Portland (2012)

Wigan (2005)

Worcester (2006)

Wolverhampton(2013)

York (2010)

==== Counties ====
Cornwall (2001, 2004)

Released by: Hasbro

Free Parking	Coverack, Helston	Chance	Callington	Penhallow, Truro	Tresco, The Scilly Isles	Fistral Beach, Newquay	Porthcurno	Water Works	Alverton Manor Hotel, Truro	Go To Jail
Arwenack Street, Falmouth	Cornwall (2001, 2004)									Prideaux Place, Padstow
Pydar Street, Truro	Cornwall (2001, 2004)									Trevarno Estate Gardens, Helston
Community Chest	Cornwall (2001, 2004)									Community Chest
Fore Street, Bodmin	Cornwall (2001, 2004)									National Maritime Museum, Cornwall
Newquay Airport	Cornwall (2001, 2004)									Land's End
The Greenbank Hotel, Falmouth	Cornwall (2001, 2004)									Chance
Recreation Ground, Redruth	Cornwall (2001, 2004)									St Michael's Mount
Telecommunications	Cornwall (2001, 2004)									Luxury Tax
St Mellion Golf Club	Cornwall (2001, 2004)									Eden Project
Jail	High Cross, Truro	Tintagel Castle	Chance	Lanhydrock House	St Ives	Income Tax	Poniou Way, Penzance	Community Chest	Looe	Go

Derbyshire

Free Parking	Osmaston Road £220	Chance	Nelson Street, Derby £220	County Hall, Matlock £240	Peak Rail £200	The Pavilion, Matlock Bath £260	Bakewell £260	Broadcaster £150	Castleton £280	Go To Jail
The Eagle Centre £200	Derbyshire									Markeaton Street, Derby £300
Market Place, Derby £180	Derbyshire									Devonshire Royal Campus, Buxton £300
Community Chest	Derbyshire									Community Chest
Irongate, Derby £180	Derbyshire									Kedleston Road, Derby £320
Matlock Bath £200	Derbyshire									The Roundhouse, Barrow Hill £200
Pride Park, Derby £160	Derbyshire									Chance
County Cricket Ground, Derby £140	Derbyshire									The Peak District £350
Hospitals £150	Derbyshire									Bank Deposit (pay £100)
Recreation Ground £140	Derbyshire									Chatsworth £400
In Jail/Just Visiting	Church Way, Chesterfield £120	Derwent Valley Mills £100	Chance	Ashbourne £100	Derby Midland station £200	Income Tax (pay £200)	The National Forest £60	Community Chest	Bellington Hill, Shardlow £60	Go (collect £200)

Isle of Wight Edition

Devon (2002)

Durham

Essex (2001, 2004)

Released by: Hasbro

Free Parking	Tiptree	Chance	Waterhouse Lane, Chelmsford	High Road, Chigwell	Stansted Airport	Hylands Estate, Chelmsford	Copped Hall, Epping	Water Works	Hartford End, Chelmsford	Go To Jail
Thurrock	Essex (2001, 2004)									Colchester Road, Harold Wood
The Meadows, Chelmsford	Essex (2001, 2004)									The Drive, Brentwood
Community Chest	Essex (2001, 2004)									Community Chest
The Brewery, Romford	Essex (2001, 2004)									Langston Road, Loughton
Queen Elizabeth II Bridge	Essex (2001, 2004)									Clacton station
The County Ground, Chelmsford	Essex (2001, 2004)									Chance
Layer Road, Colchester	Essex (2001, 2004)									Castle Park, Colchester
Telecommunications	Essex (2001, 2004)									Luxury Tax
Roots Hall Stadium, Southend	Essex (2001, 2004)									Southend Pier
Jail	Layer Marney Tower	Mountfitchet Castle, Stansted	Chance	Audley End House, Saffron Walden	Harwich Port	Income Tax	County Hall, Chelmsford	Community Chest	Rawreth Lane, Basildon	Go

Gloucestershire (2003)

Kent

Copyright date: 2002	Released by: Hasbro	Issued through: Winning Moves UK

Free Parking	Woodville Place, Gravesend	Chance (Invicta FM)	Eurotunnel Terminal, Folkestone	St Margaret's Street, Canterbury	Dartford Tunnel	Brogdale Road, Faversham	Bank Street, Herne Bay	Water Works	Marine Terrace, Margate	Go To Jail
Pentagon Shopping Centre, Chatham	Kent									Earl Street, Maidstone
Royal Victoria Place	Kent									London Road, Sevenoaks
Community Chest (Meridian Broadcasting)	Kent									Community Chest (Inland Revenue)
High Street, Ashford	Kent									St. George's Street, Canterbury
Royal Harbour, Ramsgate	Kent									Kent & East Sussex Railway
Brands Hatch, Fawkham	Kent									Chance
St Lawrence Ground, Canterbury	Kent									Leeds Castle
Energy Provider (Seeboard)	Kent									Bank Deposit (Abbey National)
Alpine Park, Gillingham	Kent									Canterbury Cathedral
Jail	Tonbridge Castle	Dover Castle	Chance (BBC South East Today)	Deal Castle	Ashford International	Income Tax (Inland Revenue)	High Street, Rochester	Community Chest (Kent Messenger)	Eurolink Way, Sittingbourne	Go

Lancashire (2000, 2001, 2002)

Released by: Hasbro	Issued through: Winning Moves Int. Ltd

Free Parking	Mallison Street, Bolton	Chance	Fleetwood	Baxenden	Lancaster Canal	Bromley Cross, Bolton	Rochdale (Gracie Fields Theatre)	Communications (Orange)	Market Square, Preston	Go To Jail
Whalley	Lancashire (2000, 2001, 2002)									Lord Street, Southport
Avroe Crescent, Blackpool	Lancashire (2000, 2001, 2002)									South King Street, Blackpool
Community Chest	Lancashire (2000, 2001, 2002)									Community Chest
St James Street, Burnley	Lancashire (2000, 2001, 2002)									Richmond Terrace, Blackburn
Bolton Street station, Bury	Lancashire (2000, 2001, 2002)									Leyland
JJB Stadium, Wigan	Lancashire (2000, 2001, 2002)									Chance
Reebok Stadium, Bolton	Lancashire (2000, 2001, 2002)									Blackpool Tower & Circus
Electric Company	Lancashire (2000, 2001, 2002)									Luxury Tax
Ewood Park, Blackburn	Lancashire (2000, 2001, 2002)									Lancaster Castle
Jail	Deepdale Stadium, Preston	Blackpool Pleasure Beach	Chance	Ribble Valley, Clitheroe	Blackpool Airport	Income Tax	Great Eccleston	Community Chest	Bamber Bridge	Go

Leicestershire (2003)

Released by: Hasbro	Issued through: Winning Moves

Free Parking	Castle Donington	Chance	City Campus, Leicester	Gallowtree Gate, Leicester	Foxton Locks	Charles Street, Leicester	Belgrave Road, Leicester	Broadcaster	Belvoir Castle	Go To Jail
High Street, Leicester	Leicestershire (2003)									Loughborough
Leicester Market	Leicestershire (2003)									City Campus De Montfort University
Community Chest	Leicestershire (2003)									Community Chest
Fosse Park, Leicester	Leicestershire (2003)									Melton Mowbray
Donington Park	Leicestershire (2003)									Grand Union Canal
Welford Road, Leicester	Leicestershire (2003)									Chance
Walkers Stadium, Leicester	Leicestershire (2003)									Bradgate Park
Transport	Leicestershire (2003)									Luxury Tax
Grace Road, Leicester	Leicestershire (2003)									Exploration Drive, Leicester
Jail	Market Harborough	Beacon Hill	Chance	Bosworth Battlefield	Great Central Railway	Income Tax	National Forest	Community Chest	Hodds Close, Leicester	Go

Somerset

Yorkshire (1999, 2000, 2006)

Free Parking	Castleford	Chance	High Street, Northallerton	Marfleet, Hull	Leeds Bradford International Airport	Aidensfield	Emmerdale	Communications (Orange)	Coppergate, York	Go To Jail
Sunbridge Road, Bradford	Yorkshire (1999, 2000, 2006)									Tadcaster Road, York
Pagoda House, Harrogate	Yorkshire (1999, 2000, 2006)									York Street, Sheffield
Community Chest	Yorkshire (1999, 2000, 2006)									Community Chest
The Headrow, Leeds	Yorkshire (1999, 2000, 2006)									Piccadilly, Bradford
Humber Bridge	Yorkshire (1999, 2000, 2006)									Doncaster Station
Headingley, Leeds	Yorkshire (1999, 2000, 2006)									Chance
Valley Parade	Yorkshire (1999, 2000, 2006)									Castle Howard
Energy Company (Yorkshire Electricity)	Yorkshire (1999, 2000, 2006)									Luxury Tax
Elland Road, Leeds	Yorkshire (1999, 2000, 2006)									York Minster
Jail	Wilberforce House, Hull	Caphouse Colliery, Wakefield	Chance	Ilkley Moor	Halifax Station	Income Tax	Wellington Street, Leeds	Community Chest	Bowers Row, Woodlesford	Go

Yorkshire Building Society (1999)

=== Scotland ===
Scotland (2001)

Released by: Hasbro

Free Parking	Loanhead, Edinburgh	Chance	Westertown Farm, Aberdeenshire	Aberlour On Spey, Speyside	West Highland Railway	Strathclyde Country Park	Wick	Water Works	Easter Elchies, Speyside	Go To Jail
Cairngorm Mountains	Scotland (2001)									Stirling
Edinburgh	Scotland (2001)									Edinburgh Castle
Community Chest	Scotland (2001)									Community Chest
Inverness	Scotland (2001)									Braemar
Edinburgh Airport	Scotland (2001)									Lerwick
Murrayfield	Scotland (2001)									Chance
Ibrox Stadium	Scotland (2001)									St Andrews
Utilities	Scotland (2001)									Bank Deposit
Celtic Park	Scotland (2001)									Balmoral
Jail	South Queensferry	Dundee	Chance	Dumfries	Forth Railway Bridge	Insurance Premium	Trossachs	Community Chest	Aberdeen	Go

Aberdeen (2006)

Dundee (2012)

Inverness (1999)

Isle of Arran (2010)

Isle of Islay (2012)

Highlands and Islands (2010)

Stirling (2017)

Scotland (Edinburgh) (2008)

Copyright date: 2008

Free Parking	Newhaven Harbour; ~~M~~220	Chance	Morningside Road; ~~M~~220	Penicuik; ~~M~~240	Edinburgh Airport; ~~M~~200	Castle Street; ~~M~~260	Grindlay Street; ~~M~~260	Communications (Cable & Wireless plc); ~~M~~150	Rose Street / North Lane; ~~M~~280	Go To Jail
George Street; ~~M~~200	Scotland (Edinburgh) (2008)									Leith Walk; ~~M~~300
Royal Mile; ~~M~~180	Scotland (Edinburgh) (2008)									Rutland Court; ~~M~~300
Community Chest	Scotland (Edinburgh) (2008)									Community Chest
Corstorphine Road; ~~M~~180	Scotland (Edinburgh) (2008)									St Andrew Square; ~~M~~320
Haymarket Station; ~~M~~200	Scotland (Edinburgh) (2008)									Waverley Station; ~~M~~200
Murrayfield / Scottish Rugby Union; ~~M~~160	Scotland (Edinburgh) (2008)									Chance
Tynecastle Stadium; ~~M~~140	Scotland (Edinburgh) (2008)									Princes Street; ~~M~~350
Electric Company; ~~M~~150	Scotland (Edinburgh) (2008)									Super Tax (pay ~~M~~100)
Easter Road; ~~M~~140	Scotland (Edinburgh) (2008)									Edinburgh Castle; ~~M~~400
In Jail/Just Visiting	Princes Street Gardens; ~~M~~120	Lauriston Castle; ~~M~~100	Chance	Lady Stair's Close; ~~M~~100	Forth Road Bridge; ~~M~~200	Income Tax (pay ~~M~~200)	Barnton Grove; ~~M~~60	Community Chest	Shore Place; ~~M~~60	GO (collect ~~M~~200)

Other features: (other versions: 1998, 1999, 2000)

Glasgow (1999, 2000, 2001, 2004, 2006)

Free Parking	Auchentoshan Distillery	Chance	Duke Street	Gallowgate	Buchanan Street Bus Station	Bath Street	Sauchiehall Street	Water Works	West Nile Street	Go To Jail
Howard Street	Glasgow (1999, 2000, 2001, 2004, 2006)									West Regent Street
Byres Road	Glasgow (1999, 2000, 2001, 2004, 2006)									Charing Cross
Community Chest	Glasgow (1999, 2000, 2001, 2004, 2006)									Community Chest
Buchanan Street	Glasgow (1999, 2000, 2001, 2004, 2006)									Bothwell Street
Queen Street Station	Glasgow (1999, 2000, 2001, 2004, 2006)									Central Station
National Stadium	Glasgow (1999, 2000, 2001, 2004, 2006)									Chance
Argyle Street	Glasgow (1999, 2000, 2001, 2004, 2006)									George Square
Energy Company "Powergen"	Glasgow (1999, 2000, 2001, 2004, 2006)									Luxury Tax
Celtic Park	Glasgow (1999, 2000, 2001, 2004, 2006)									Pollok Country Park
Jail	The Lighthouse	Kelvingrove	Chance	Richmond Street	St Enoch Underground Station	Income Tax	Queen's Park	Community Chest	Botanic Gardens	Go

Rangers F.C. (2000)

Celtic F.C. (2001, 2004)

=== Wales ===
Wales-Cymru (1999, 2000)

Free Parking	Southern Snowdonia	Chance	Oakwood, Pembrokeshire	The Cardiff Brewery	Swansea station	Pobol y Cwm	Portmeirion	Communications (Orange)	Havannah Street, Cardiff	Go To Jail
Llanarthne	Wales-Cymru (1999, 2000)									Royal Mint
The Quadrant Centre, Swansea	Wales-Cymru (1999, 2000)									Caerphilly Business Park
Community Chest	Wales-Cymru (1999, 2000)									Community Chest
Vale Road	Wales-Cymru (1999, 2000)									Wood Street, Cardiff
Cardiff International Airport	Wales-Cymru (1999, 2000)									Fishguard
Millennium Stadium	Wales-Cymru (1999, 2000)									Chance
The Race Course, Wrexham	Wales-Cymru (1999, 2000)									Pembrokeshire, St Davids
Electric Company	Wales-Cymru (1999, 2000)									Luxury Tax
Sophia Gardens, Cardiff	Wales-Cymru (1999, 2000)									Caernarvon Castle
Jail	Snowdonia National Park	Pembrokeshire Coast	Chance	Brecon Beacons	Holyhead	Income Tax	Port of Aberystwyth	Community Chest	New Inn/Port of Barry	Go

Yn Gymraeg

Copyright date: 2007	Issued through: Winning Moves

Parcio di-dâl (Free Parking)	Beddgelert	Siawns (Chance)	Talacharn (Laugharne)	Llangollen	Pont Cleddau	Aberystwyth	Llandudno	Llyn Brianne (Water Works)	Penarth	Ewch i'r Carchar (Go to Jail)
Caerfyrddin (Carmarthen)	Yn Gymraeg									Bro Morgannwg (Vale of Glamorgan)
Caernarfon	Yn Gymraeg									Pen Llyn (Lleyn Peninsula)
Cist y gymuned (Community Chest)	Yn Gymraeg									Cist y gymuned (Community Chest)
Aberhonddu (Brecon)	Yn Gymraeg									Penrhyn Gwyr (Gower)
Pont Hafren (Severn Bridge)	Yn Gymraeg									Pontcysyllte
Y Fenni (Abergavenny)	Yn Gymraeg									Siawns (Chance)
Y Bala	Yn Gymraeg									Glannaur Fenai (Menai Straits)
Dinorwig	Yn Gymraeg									Treth y cyngor (Super Tax)
Y Trallwng (Welshpool)	Yn Gymraeg									Bae Caerdydd (Cardiff Bay)
Yn i Carchar (In Jail)	Caergybi (Holyhead)	Blaenau Ffestiniog	Siawns (Chance)	Cwm Rhondda	Pont Menai (Menai Suspension Bridge)	Treth incwm (Income tax)	Cwm-sgwt Isaf	Cist y gymuned (Community Chest)	Cwm-sgwt Uchaf	Ewch

Anglesey (2011)

Cardiff (2009)

Newport (2014)

Swansea (2005)

=== Northern Ireland ===
Northern Ireland Edition (2000, 2001)

Released by: Hasbro	Issued through: Winning Moves Int. Ltd.

Free Parking	Irwin's Bakery, Co. Armagh (Irwin's)	Chance	Boucher Road, Belfast (Toyota)	Moira Road, Lisburn (Pure & Natural McKinney's)	Belfast City Airport	Lanyon Place, Belfast (Belfast Waterfront)	Botanic Adventure, Belfast (The Belfast Empire)	Disc Drives Company (Seagate)	Victoria Street, Belfast (Marco Polo)	Go To Jail
Bow Street, Lisburn (Eason)	Northern Ireland Edition (2000, 2001)									Russell Court, Belfast (GCAS Group)
Lisburn Road, Belfast (Winemark Wine Merchant)	Northern Ireland Edition (2000, 2001)									Upper Crescent, Belfast (Kains)
Community Chest	Northern Ireland Edition (2000, 2001)									Community Chest
The Quays Newry (Newry Shopping & Leisure)	Northern Ireland Edition (2000, 2001)									Great Victoria Street, Belfast (PWC)
Larne Harbour	Northern Ireland Edition (2000, 2001)									Belfast Central station (Enterprise)
?	Northern Ireland Edition (2000, 2001)									Chance
Castlereagh (International Ice Bowl)	Northern Ireland Edition (2000, 2001)									Belfast City Hall (Belfast City Council)
Natural Gas Company (Phoenix Natural Gas)	Northern Ireland Edition (2000, 2001)									Luxury Tax
Upper Malone Road, Belfast (Sports Council NI)	Northern Ireland Edition (2000, 2001)									Giant's Causeway
Jail	Antrim Road, Belfast (Belfast Zoo)	Rowallane, Saintfield (The National Trust)	Chance	Head Road, Kilkeel	Belfast International Airport	Income Tax	Donegall Place, Belfast (vodafone)	Community Chest	Hillview House, Newtownabbey (Service & Systems Solutions)	Go

Belfast (2009)

The Glór na nGael Irish language edition (2015; see #Ireland) is an all-Ireland edition and so includes some sites in Northern Ireland (Rathlin Island, Stormont, Ulster, Armagh cathedral, the Giant's Causeway).

=== Channel Islands ===
A Jersey edition, with locations from around Jersey, including streets and landmarks, was issued in 2004. The stations are replaced by Jersey airport, two harbours and a lighthouse.

There have also been two different versions for Guernsey. A late 1990s version and an early 2010s updated version. Landmarks include Fort Grey and Castle Cornet and differ with design and some landmarks between the two different version but the majority is the same.
