= Cochrane Park =

Coordinates: 54.997°N 1.573°W

- Location within Tyne and Wear
- OS grid reference: NZ274669
  - London: 242 miles (389 km)
- Metropolitan borough: Newcastle upon Tyne
- Metropolitan county: Tyne and Wear
- Region: North East
- Country: England
- Sovereign state: United Kingdom
- Post town: NEWCASTLE UPON TYNE
- Postcode district: NE7
- Dialling code: 0191
- Police: Northumbria
- Fire: Tyne and Wear
- Ambulance: North East
- UK Parliament: Newcastle upon Tyne Central

Cochrane Park, located at Newcastle upon Tyne, England, is the principal competitive venue for football, rugby and cricket at Newcastle University. It is named after Sir Cecil Cochrane who donated 20 acres of land to the university. It has three county standard football pitches, three county standard rugby pitches, a cricket square, a lacrosse pitch and five tennis courts. The site also offers a pavilion with team changing facilities, function suite and bar facilities. Newcastle University was an official Games-Time Training Venue for the London 2012 Olympic Games, and the university's Cochrane Park sports ground was a dedicated football training venue for the Games in July 2012.

The area around the Cochrane Park sports ground is also widely known as Cochrane Park and is home to Newcastle University's residential facility called Henderson Hall and the Coach Lane Campus of Northumbria University and Roy Haygarth. It consists of many streets such as Felixstowe Drive, Cochrane Park Avenue, Bretton Gardens, Turbina Gardens and Vancouver Drive, opposite the Lochside Public House. It is known as a middle class area. It borders High Heaton, and has local walkways which link it to Paddy Freemans Park and Victoria Glade Park.
