= Miersch =

Miersch is a surname. Notable people with the surname include:

- Ekkehard Miersch (born 1936), German swimmer
- Konrad Miersch (1907–1942), German modern pentathlete
- Matthias Miersch (born 1968), German lawyer and politician
- Paul Miersch (1868–1956), German-born American composer
