= St Patrick's Cathedral, Armagh =

There are two St Patrick's Cathedrals in Armagh, Northern Ireland:

- St Patrick's Cathedral, Armagh (Church of Ireland), the Anglican cathedral (and the Catholic cathedral prior to the Protestant Reformation)
- St Patrick's Cathedral, Armagh (Roman Catholic), built after the Reformation
