= Stockholm Norra station =

Railway station in Stockholm, Sweden

Coordinates: 59°20′53.02″N 18°2′15.82″E

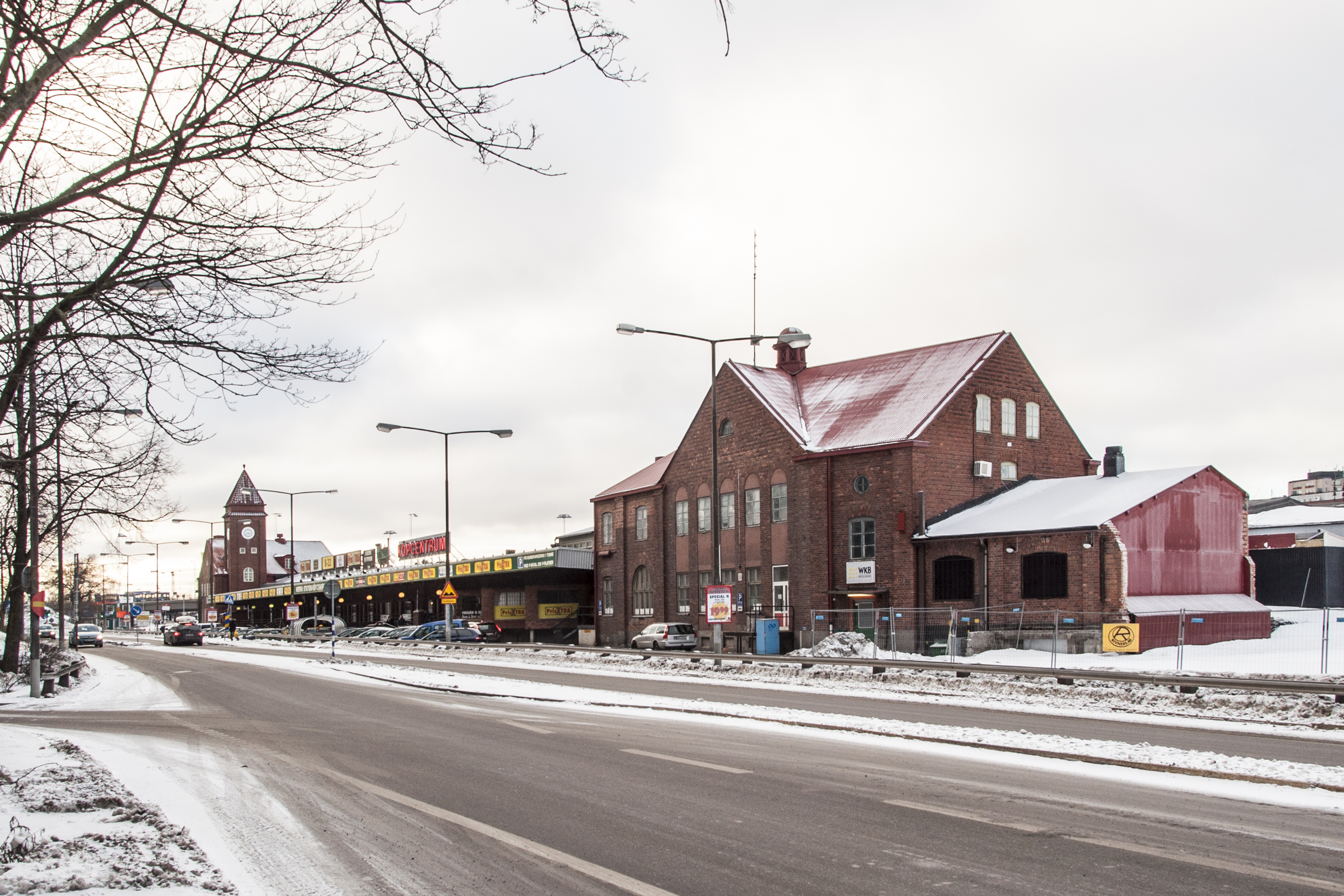
North Station at Norra stationsgatan ("North Station Street") with the so-called Bell House.

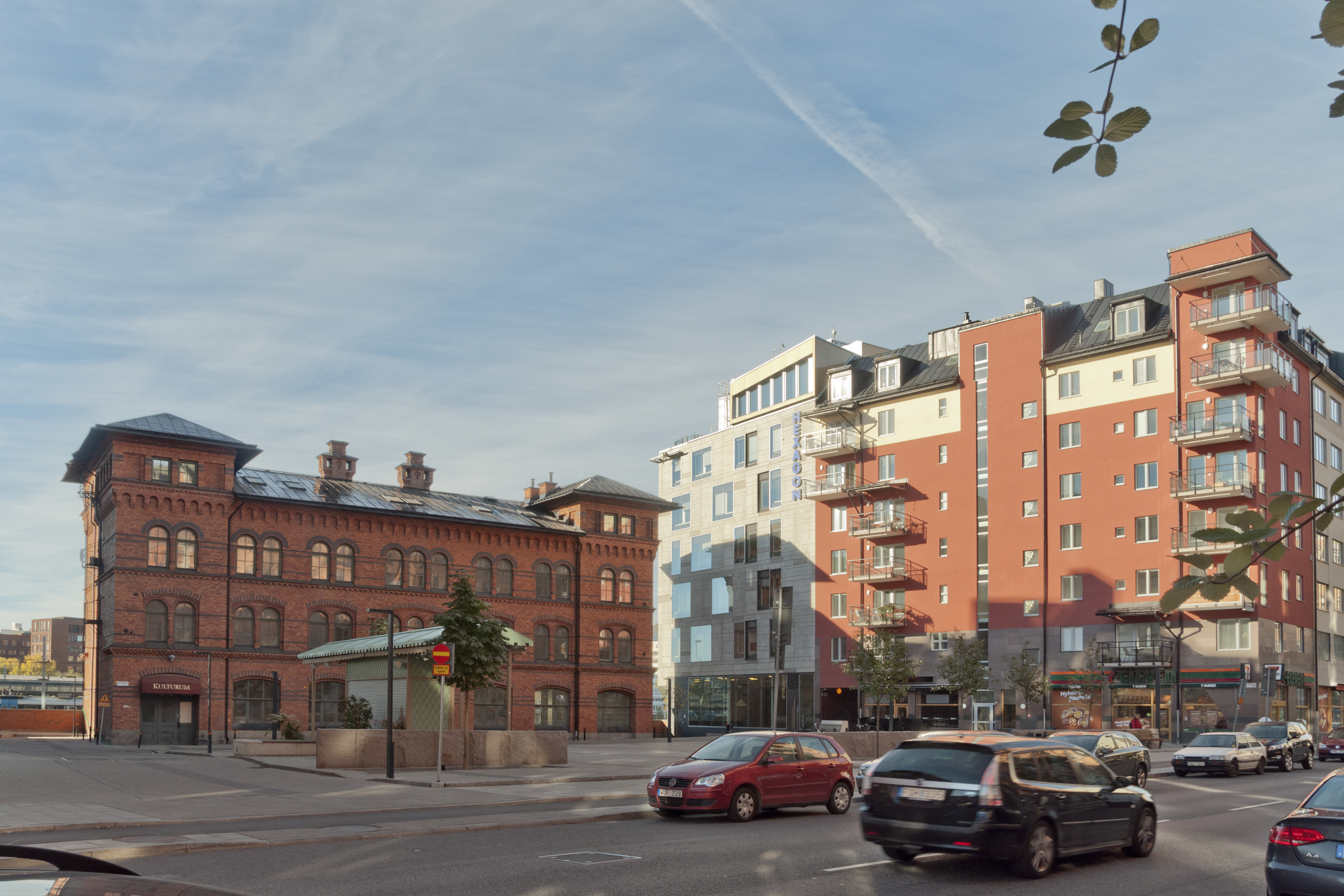
The first North Station building at Norra Bantorget.

Stockholm Norra Station (Swedish: Stockholms norra station, literally Stockholm North station) or Stockholm N has been the name of two different railway stations in Stockholm, Sweden. Both have been used mostly for freight trains and not for passenger traffic.

The first Norra Station was opened on September 1866, first used as a temporary main station for trains on the northern lines. It was situated at Norra Bantorget ("Northern Railway Square"), a square which got its name from this. All passenger operations moved to the central station in 1871.

In 1925 the station was moved to Norrtull, where a new Norra Station was built at the railway line Värtabanan. This station was in use until the 1990s. Parts of the station are now being replaced with new buildings for apartments. The main freight train station in north Stockholm is now Tomteboda.
