= Christoffel van Dijck =

Dutch type designer (1605 – 1669)

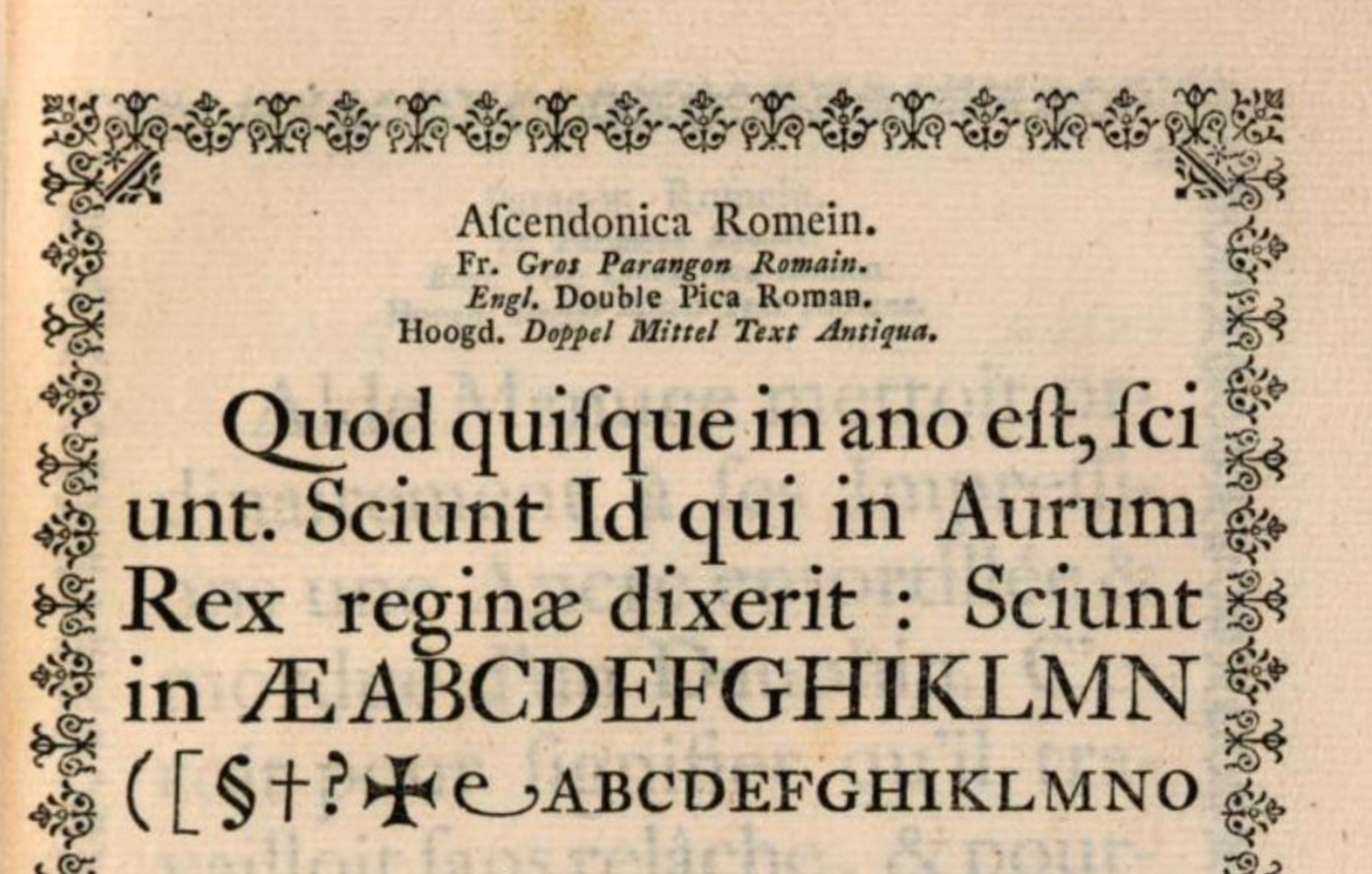
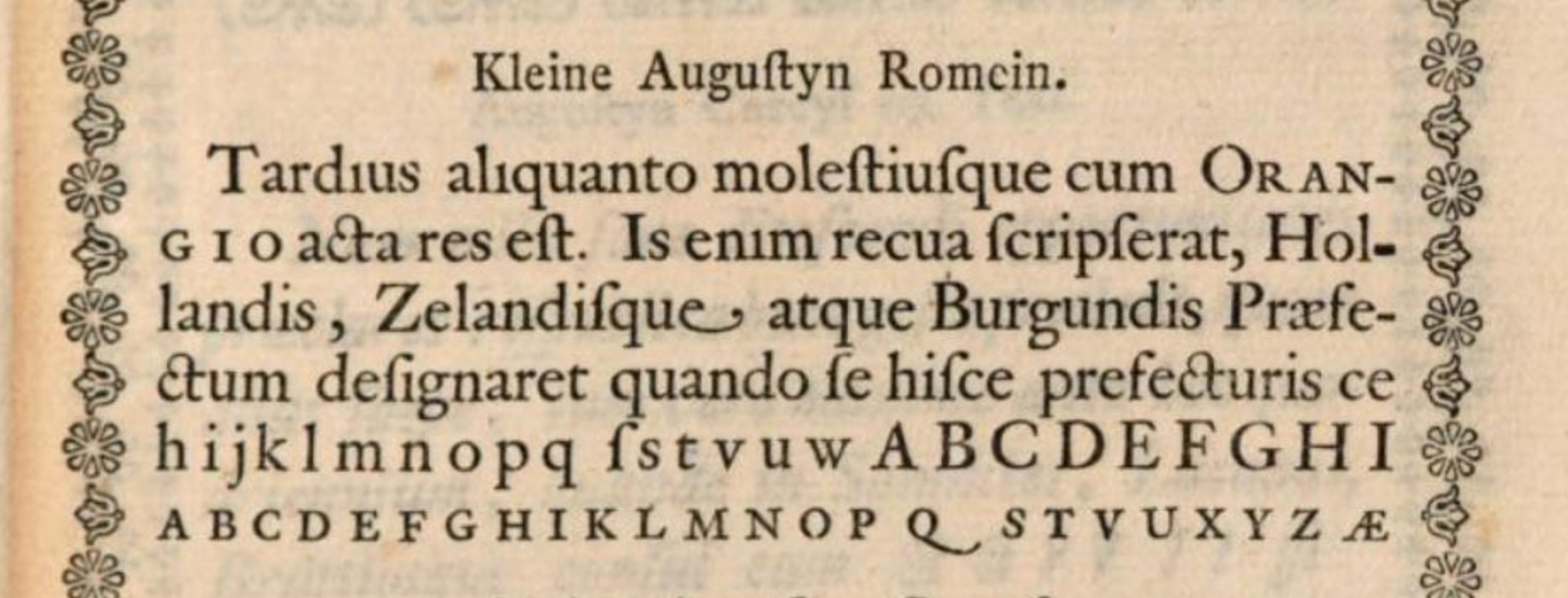
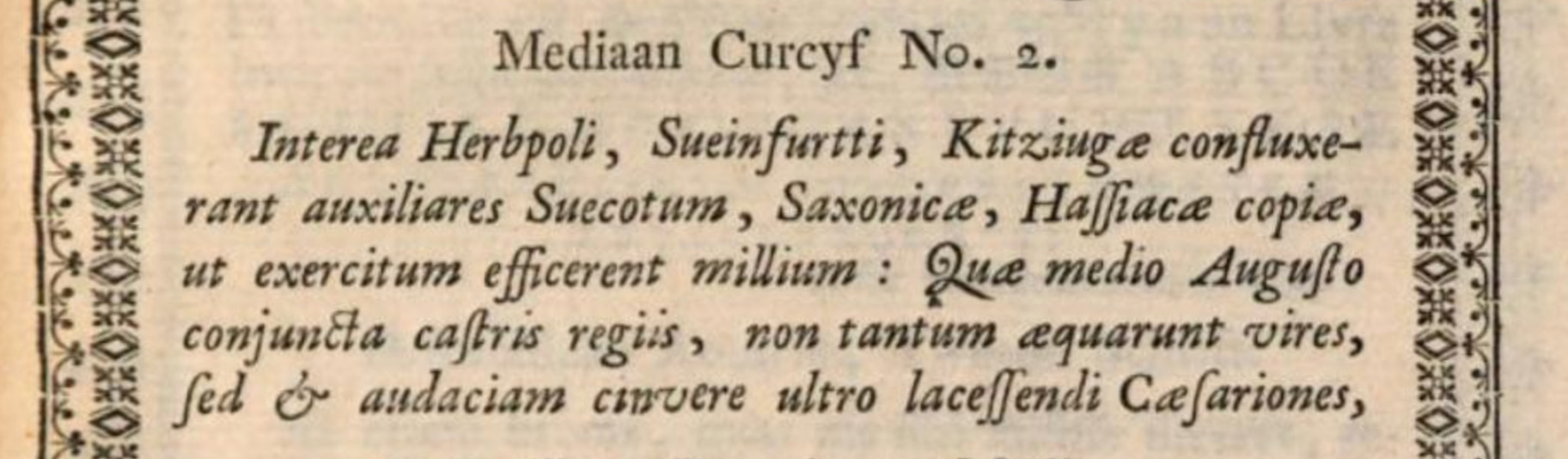

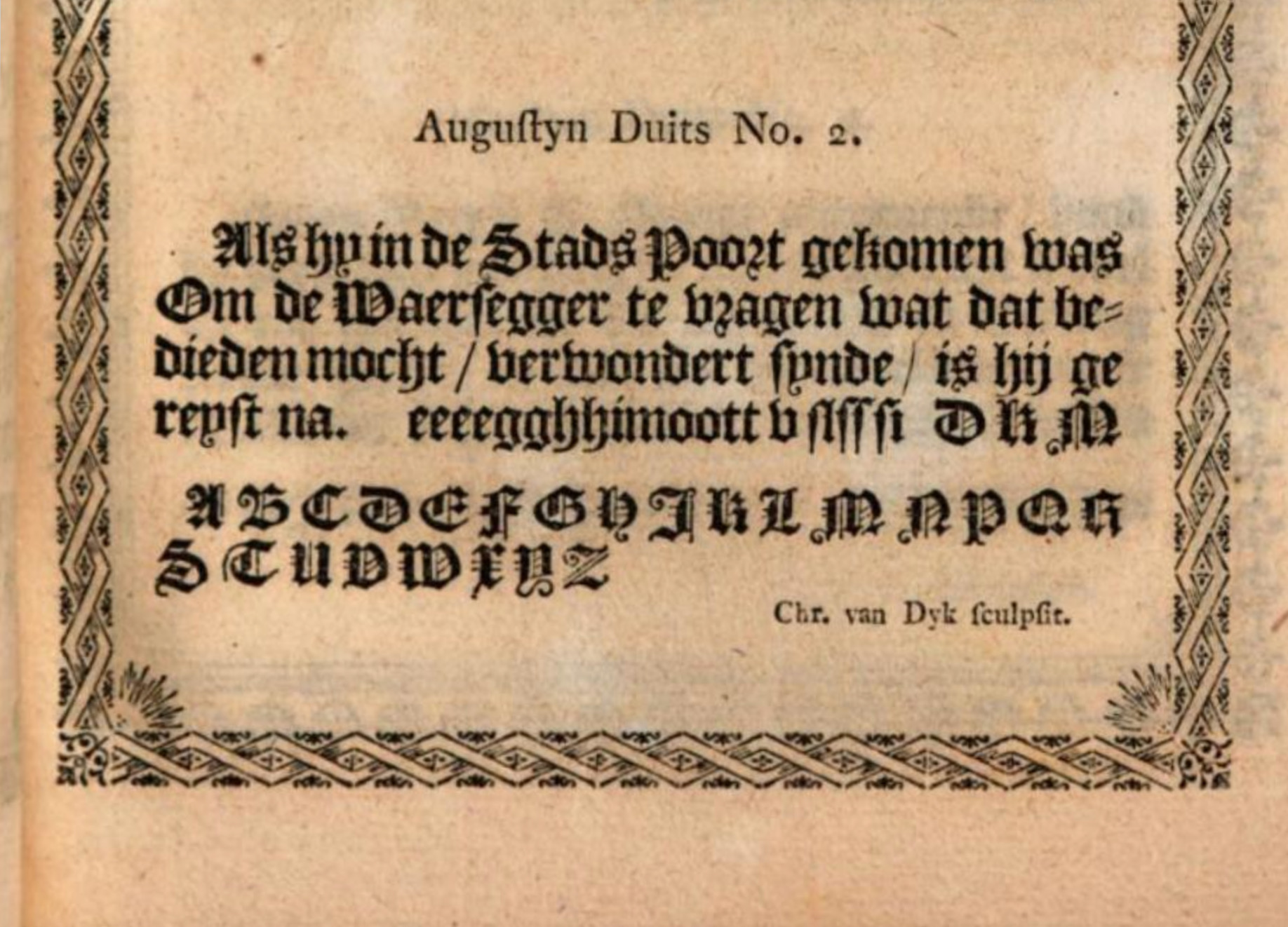
Four types by van Dijck in the Enschedé specimen of 1768: Ascendonica and Kleine Augustyn roman, Mediaan italic and Augustyn blackletter.

Christoffel van Dijck (c. 1600-5, Dexheim – November 1669, Amsterdam) (Note: Date of birth in the view of Lane (2012); records are inconsistent.) was a German-born Dutch punchcutter and typefounder, who cut punches and operated a foundry for casting metal type. Van Dijck's type was widely used at a time when Amsterdam had become a major centre of world printing.

== Life ==
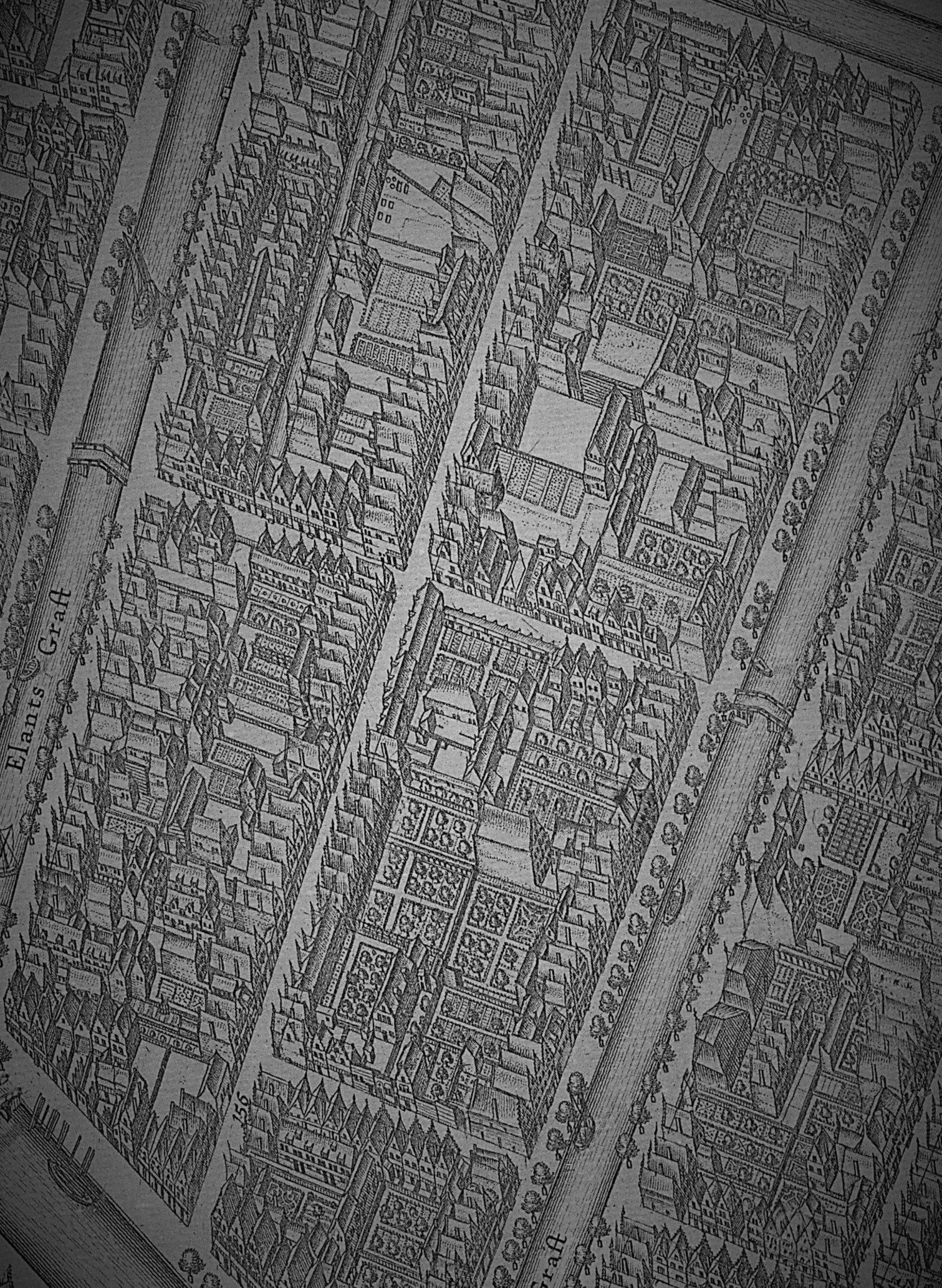
This detail of a map by Balthasar Florisz. van Berckenrode (1647) shows the Elandsstraat and the Hazenstraat in the middle; a little bit down is the location of two houses under one roof with a portal (to an inn), a barn and a garden.

Van Dijck was born in Dexheim, now in Germany, to a Dutch Protestant family. His father Gilbert Breberenus van den Dijck and half-brother Johannes were Calvinist ministers. Gilbert had come to Dexheim from Breberen (in the United Duchies of Jülich-Cleves-Berg). Christoffel was trained as a goldsmith. By 1640 he moved to Amsterdam as a journeyman. On 11 October 1642 he applied to marry Swaentje Harmens (c. 1600/1601 – 1668) from Nordhorn, the widow of former minister Jan de Praet.

Van Dijck then changed career to become a specialist in cutting steel punches, the masters used to stamp matrices, the moulds used to cast a letterform in metal type. (Note: This is a slight simplification: technically in metal typesetting a distinction is made between the adjustable hand mould that casts the main body of the type, and the matrix, which is the mould only for the letter shape.) How he began this career change is not documented; John A. Lane, a historian of printing in the Netherlands and expert on van Dijck's career, speculates that he may have begun by cutting types for other typefounders. In 1647 he rented a house on the Bloemgracht in which he set up a type foundry. This was close to the printing office of his client Joan Blaeu. By the end of his career his foundry was based on Elandsstraat. He died in November 1669 and was buried in the nearby Westerkerk. His near contemporary Rembrandt had been buried there the previous month.

== Career ==
Van Dijck became the most prominent type-founder of his time in the Netherlands, cutting type in roman, italic, blackletter, Armenian, music type, and probably printers' flowers. In or shortly before 1655 he drew out lettering for rooms in the Royal Palace of Amsterdam, then the city hall.

From a surviving 1681 specimen, Stan Knight comments that in his type "the capitals are generally quite wide, and many of them...have a strong thick/thin contrast. The lowercase has comparatively short ascenders, resulting in a large x-height." Max Caflisch felt that a distinguishing feature of van Dijck's types were that "the contrast between the hair lines and the main strokes is more pronounced...the capital letters are more powerful...the typeface in general appears to have been cut more sharply". The polymath Joseph Moxon, who knew him, praised the Dutch types of the period for "commodious fatness they have beyond other letters which easing the eyes in reading, renders them more legible" and van Dijck's in particular for the "harmony and decorum of their symmetry" and the "good reason for his order and method." His types included swash capitals and terminal forms, although smaller numbers than were common in Robert Granjon's italics. Van Dijck worked in a style later described by Pierre Simon Fournier as the goût Hollandois or Dutch taste, which favoured darker type on the page and stronger contrast than earlier types in the Garamond style from the French renaissance. He was likely influenced in this by the earlier Amsterdam punchcutter Nicolaes Briot.

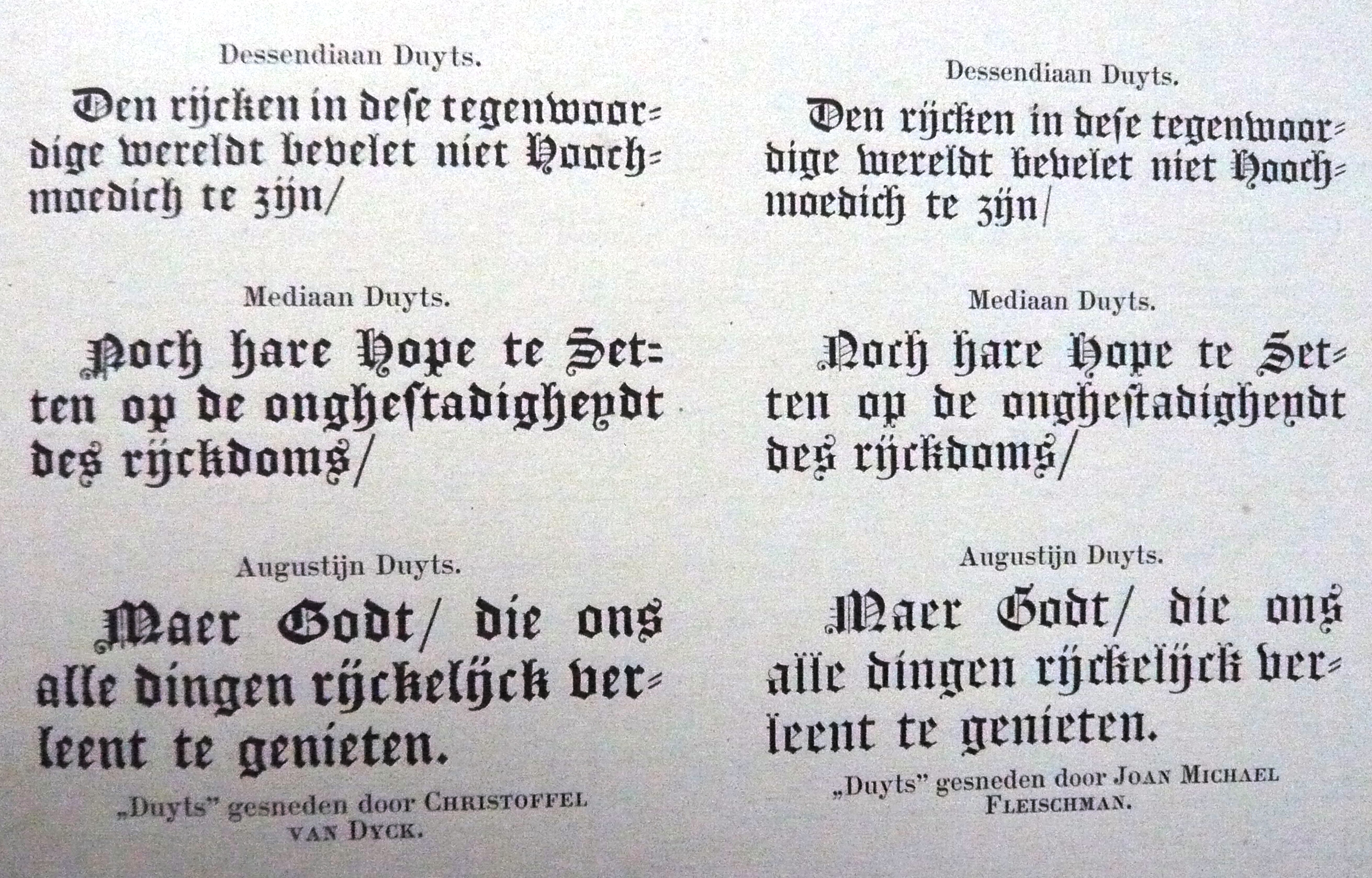
Blackletter types by van Dijck compared to those cut by Joan Michael Fleischman in the following century.

His blackletter types are ornate, with many teardrop terminals, especially on the capitals, apparently again following the lead of types cut by Briot.

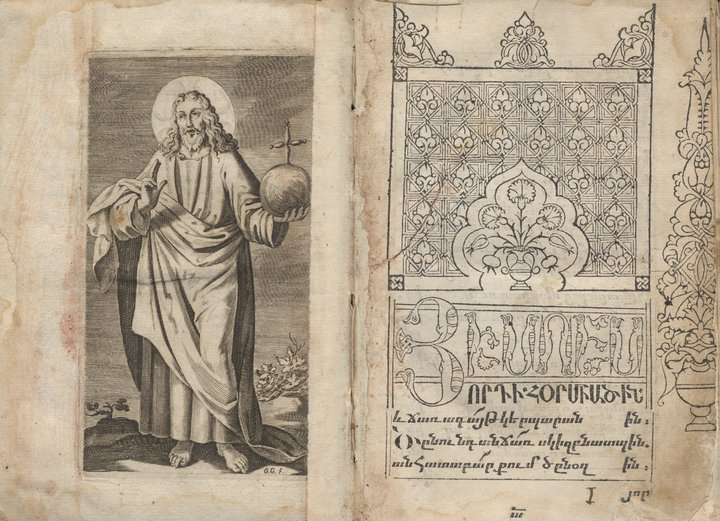
Yisus vordi (Jesus the son), a book printed by Van Dijck's client Matteos Tsaretsi in 1661. The body text uses van Dijck's Text bolorgir Armenian type.

Van Dijck worked extensively on making type in the Armenian alphabet for Armenian printers in Amsterdam. On 27 November 1658 he contracted with the Armenian Matteos Tsaretsi (Matheos van Tsar in Dutch) to make punches and matrices to print an Armenian bible, and continued to work on Armenian types for the rest of his life.

Understanding of van Dijck's career has been limited by a lack of knowledge of what types he cut: as was common for pre-nineteenth century printing materials a large proportion of his punches and matrices were lost due to changing artistic tastes in favour of "modern face" typefaces, being destroyed from around 1808 by Enschedé at a time when it was also in financial difficulties, although some survive at Enschedé, and others in the collection of Oxford University Press. An impressive but jumbled specimen was issued by the widow of Daniel Elzevir in 1681 offering what had been his foundry for sale, of which a single copy survives in the Plantin-Moretus Museum, Antwerp. Fragments of an earlier specimen are also extant at Cambridge University Library.

A specimen issued by van Dijck in 1668/1669 was found to exist in the National Archives in London by historian Justin Howes; according to Lane as of 2013 it had yet to be published.

Besides van Dijck's own types, his foundry sold many older types. For example, by the year after his death Abraham van Dijck owned matrices for a Greek type cut by Robert Granjon. (Note: This 10pt type, like Granjon's other Greeks, is a copy of Claude Garamond's Grecs du roi types.) Marshall bought matrices for this type which survive at Oxford University Press, probably from Abraham van Dijck, or possibly another source in the Netherlands; if they did come from van Dijck his foundry was apparently able to source a second set of matrices since the type is advertised on the 1681 specimen. Besides this, on the 1681 specimen a number of other types are also known to be by Granjon, Claude Garamond, Hendrik van den Keere and possibly Pierre Haultin. (Note: Specifically, the type of the word "Proeven" is by van den Keere, the Dubbelde Mediaen Kapitalen, Brevier No. 2 and Augustijn No. 2 romans and Paragon, Augustijn, first Mediaen and Garmont italic by Granjon, the Dubblede Descendiaan titling capitals and Text roman by Garamond, and the Mediaen Romeyn No. 2 probably by Pierre Haultin. The Brevier italic (the showings share many but not all characters) is of uncertain attribution; it seems to be a copy of a Granjon italic, whether van Dijck or someone else cut it. The Dubbelde Text and Dubbelde Augustijn capitals may also be by other engravers. According to Lane the unpublished 1668/9 specimen also shows an old-fashioned Greek type in Mediaen size.) According to Marshall Amsterdam typefounders were able to buy earlier types from Frankfurt.

Van Dijck apparently had a strong reputation in his lifetime and beyond, aided by the connection between Protestant Britain and the Dutch Republic. Marshall considered him a "famous artist". Moxon, who spent time in the Netherlands as a child and later met van Dijck on returning as an adult, wrote soon after his death that "Holland letters in general are in most esteem, and particularly those that have been cut by the hand of that curious artist Christofel van Dijck, and some very few others...when the Stadthouse at Amsterdam was finishing, such was the curiosity of the Lords that were the Overseers of the building, that they offered C. van Dijck aforesaid 80 Pounds Sterling (as himself told me) only for drawing in paper the names of the several offices that were to be painted over the doors, for the painter to paint by" and also praised them extensively in his Mechanick Exercises of 1683. Many, although not all, of his types are also identified in the Enschedé type foundry specimen dated 1768, (Note: But probably actually issued in 1769, when a portrait in it is dated.) specifically his smaller types and blackletters from the middle of the book.

Several digital fonts based on van Dijck's work have been published, including DTL Elzevir (1992) from Dutch Type Library, based on his Augustijn (12pt size) type, and Custodia (2002–06) by Fred Smeijers.

== Legacy ==
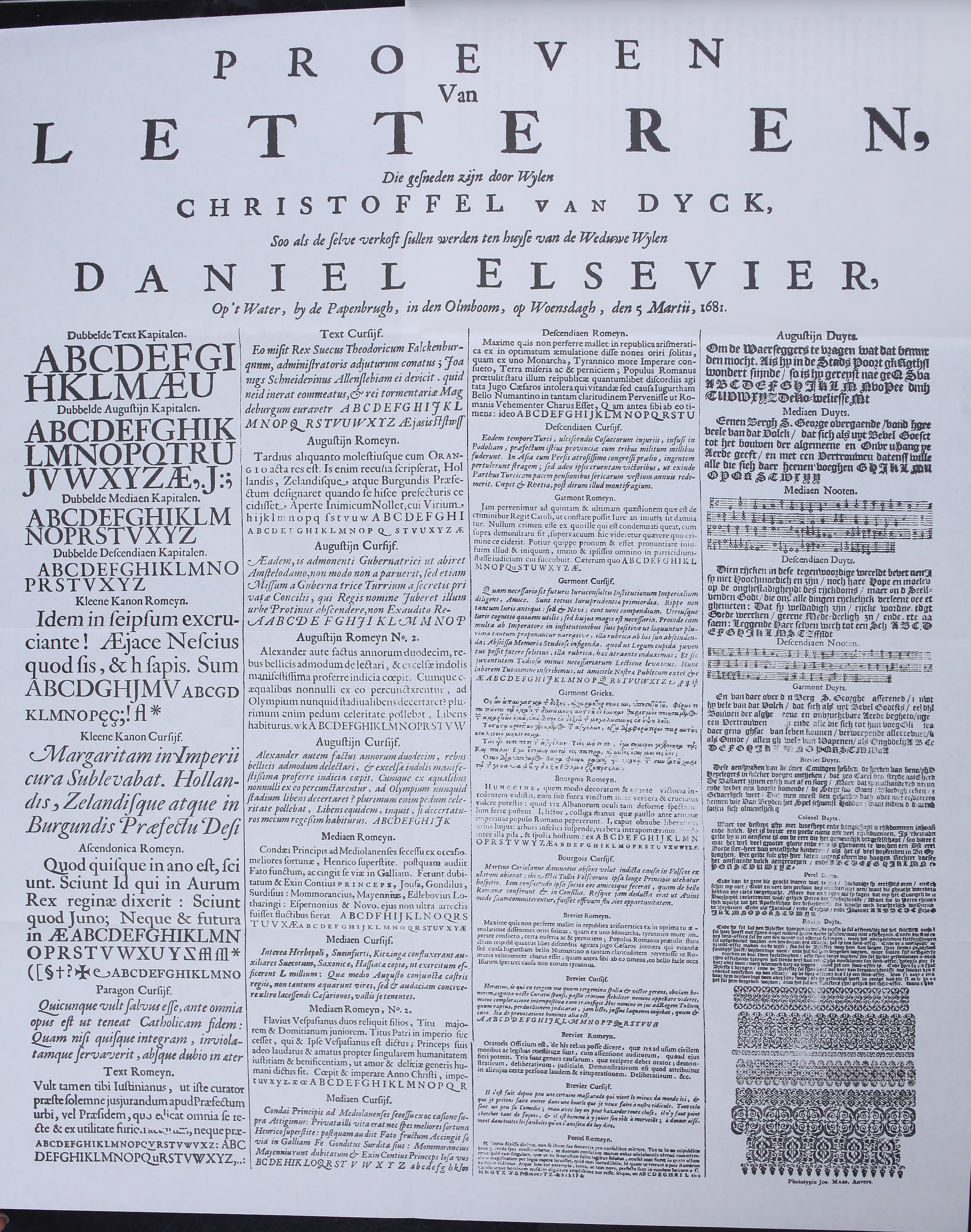
The widow of Daniel Elsevier's type specimen offering van Dijck's foundry for sale in 1681 (facsimile). Not all the types shown are by van Dijck.

On van Dijck's death, his foundry was taken over by his son Abraham (1645–1672), who was also a punchcutter. Abraham van Dijck sold matrices to Thomas Marshall, who was acting on behalf of Bishop John Fell in Oxford to create a collection of printing materials for Oxford University Press. Many of these survive, as does their correspondence. Marshall wrote to Fell in April 1670 that "this last winter had sent van Dijck and [Bartholomeus] Voskens, the two best artists in this country, to their graves."

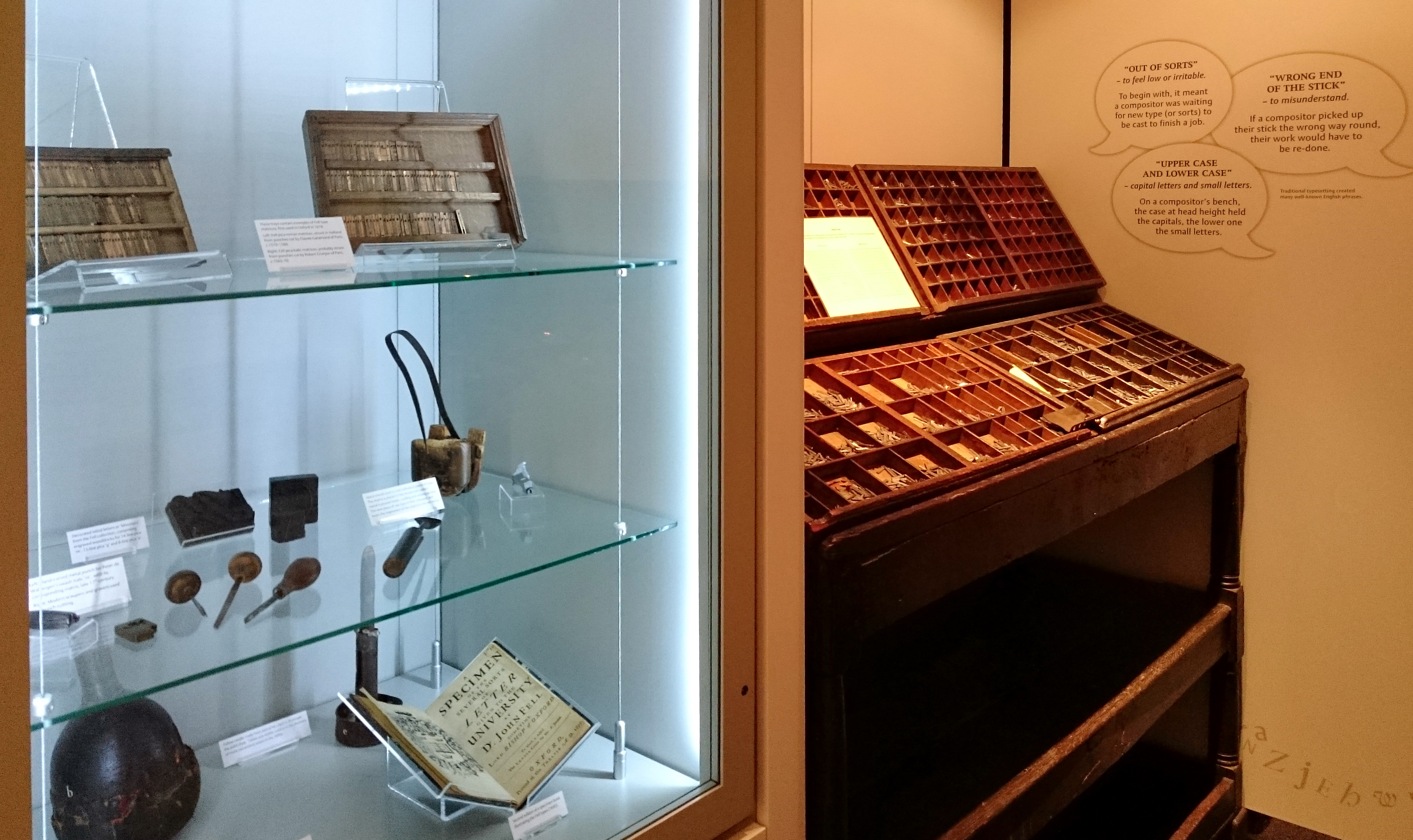
Some of van Dijck's materials (not shown in photo) are preserved by Oxford University Press.

Abraham van Dijck suffered from poor health, and his steadily declining condition forms a large part of Marshall's correspondence. He finally died in February 1672. (Note: Abraham van Dijck was buried in the Westerkerk on 26 February 1672; van Eeghen's date of 23 February is a mistake. Some writers have also incorrectly believed this death record refers to the little-known painter Abraham van Dijck. The fact that the Abraham who was Christoffel van Dijck's son died in February 1672 (new style) is also reported in Marshall's letters to Fell.) The following April the foundry was auctioned, and bought by Daniel Elsevier of the Elzevir family of printers.

In 1680 Daniel Elsevier died. His widow felt unable to run the foundry and placed it up for sale, leading to the printing of the well-known 1681 specimen; she herself died shortly afterwards and before the auction could take place. Following her death it was bought by Joseph Athias, the printer of books in Hebrew who cooperated with the widow of Jan Jacobsz. Schipper printing English bibles. Around 1707 his son Manuel Athias sold his part in the foundry to the heir Cornelia Schipper.

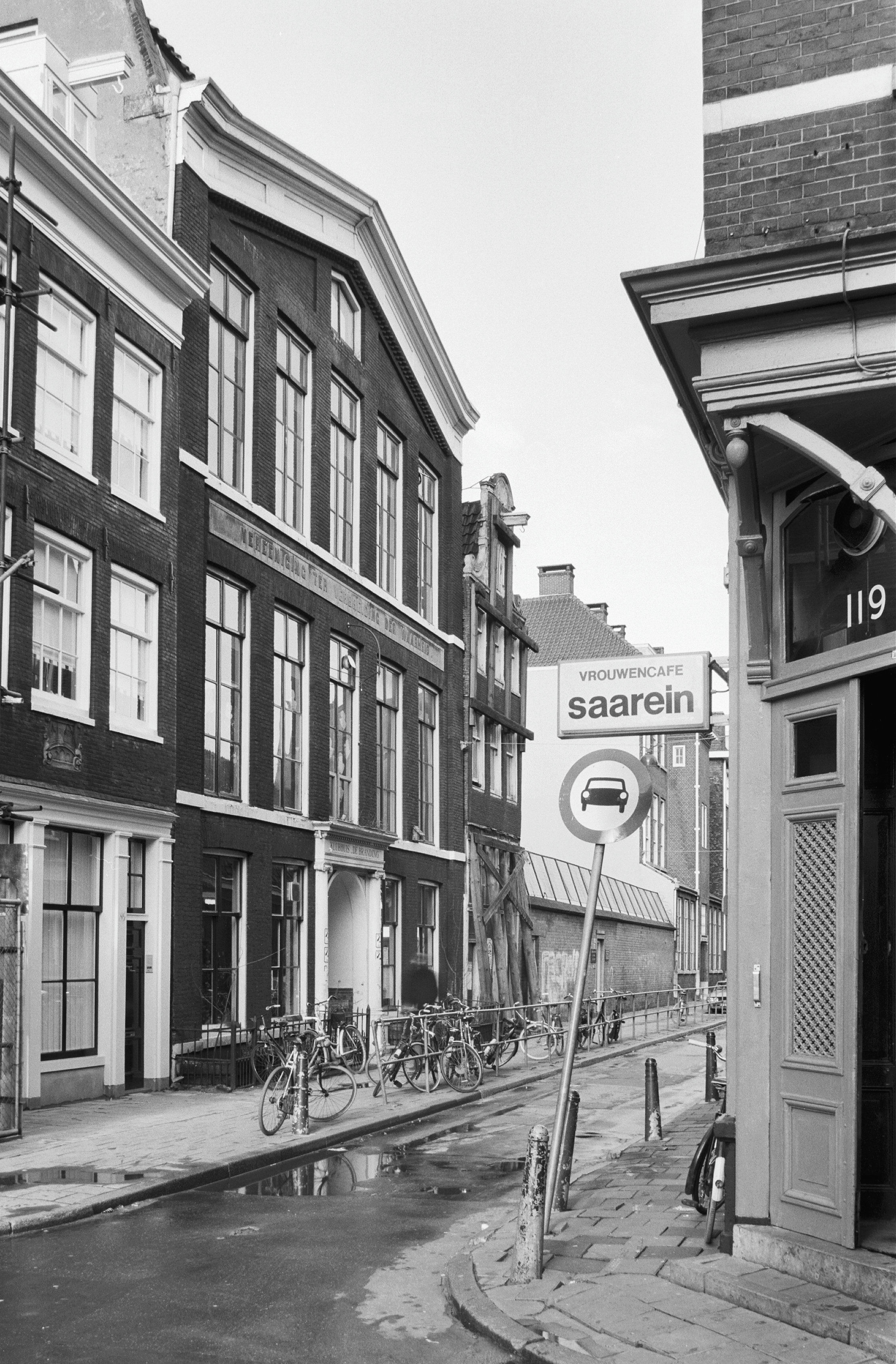
In the 17th century, behind Elandsstraat 84 (image shows later building), with an entrance through a portal, was a garden with a barn and a backhouse, where Van Dijck and his assistants worked.

In 1755 the family closed the business at Nieuwe Herengracht; the foundry was bought by Jan Roman the younger (1709–1770), bookseller in the Kalverstraat. In 1767 the foundry was auctioned again, and materials bought by both the Enschedé foundry in Haarlem and the Ploos van Amstel brothers in Amsterdam, the latter bought by Enschedé in 1799. The standing type used to print the 1681 specimen continued to be used by the successors to van Dijck's foundry to print specimens, including the 1768 Enschedé specimen.
