= Dutch Type Library =

Digital type foundry

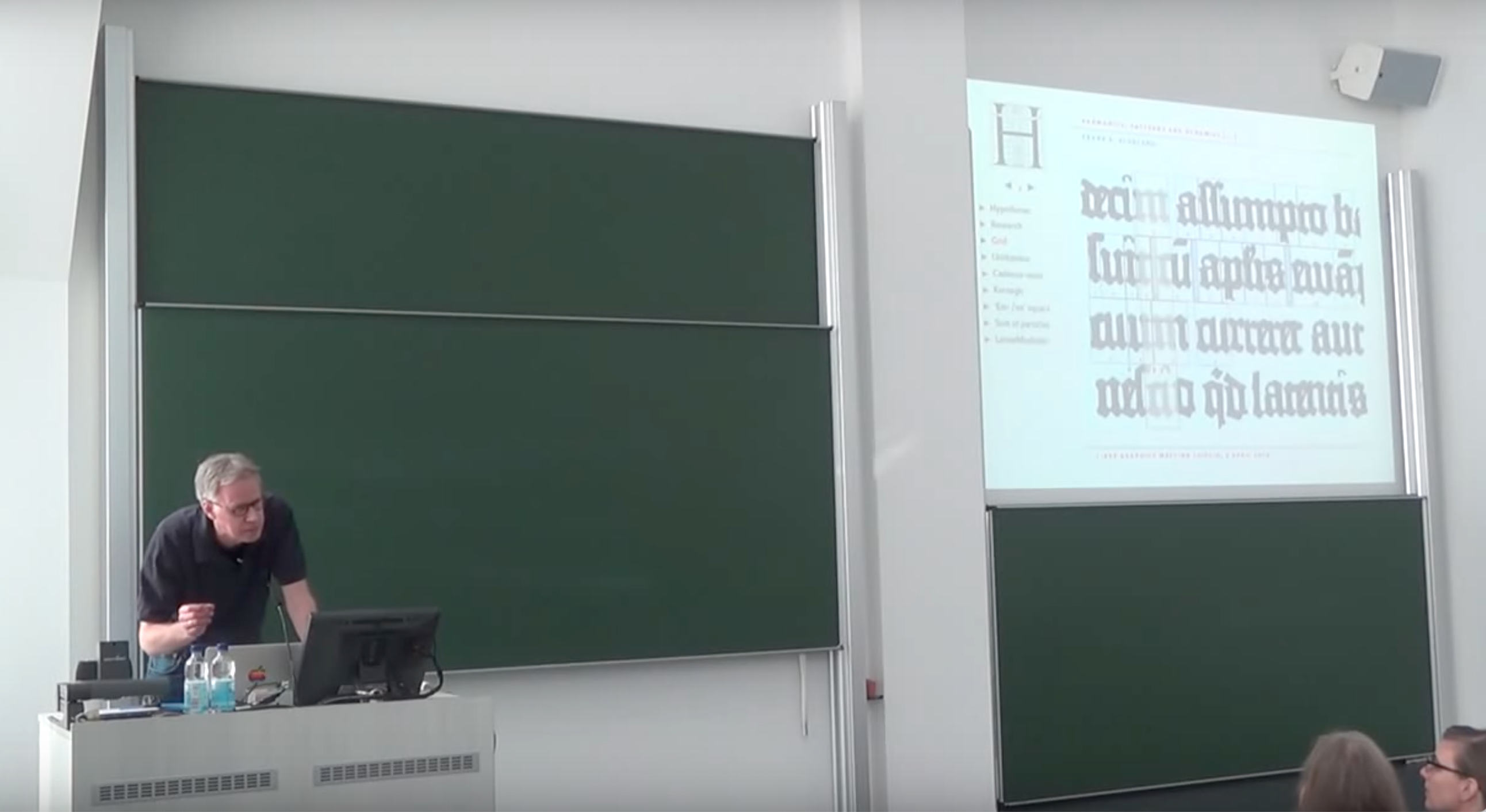
DTL founder Frank E. Blokland speaking in 2014

Dutch Type Library is a digital font foundry based in 's-Hertogenbosch, Netherlands, established in 1990 by Frank E. Blokland. DTL designs digital fonts and develops font software. Alongside original designs such as the Documenta and Caspari families, DTL has published work inspired by the work of Dutch type designers of the past, including revivals of the work of Hendrik van den Keere, Christoffel van Dijck, Joan Michaël Fleischman, Jacques François Rosart and Jan van Krimpen. Blokland received a doctorate on the spacing and proportions of early metal type from Leiden University in 2016.
