= Hendrik van den Keere =

16th-century punchcutter

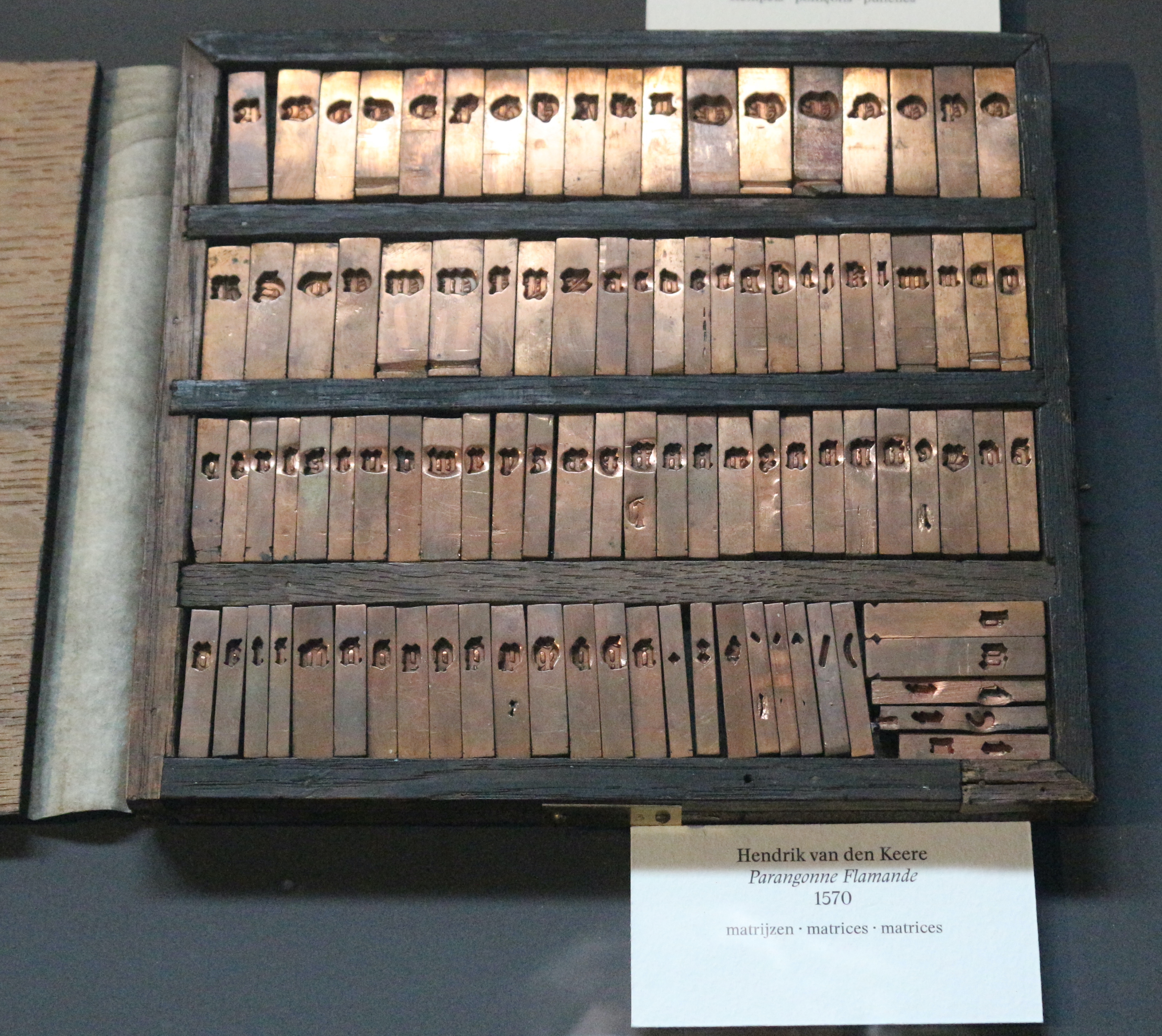
- Matrices for van den Keere's Parangonne Flamande typeface, preserved at the Plantin-Moretus Museum
- Born: c. 1540; Ghent, Spanish Netherlands
- Died: 1580
- Known for: Typography, punchcutting

Van den Keere's Two-Line Double Pica roman type

Hendrik van den Keere (c. 1540/2 – 1580) was a punchcutter, or cutter of punches used to make metal type, who lived in Ghent in the Spanish Netherlands (now Belgium). He is known for his work supplying type to the printing house of Christophe Plantin in Antwerp, one of the largest printing enterprises of the sixteenth century.

Over the course of his career he cut around thirty typefaces, including blackletter, roman type and music type. His large roman types, notable for their bold proportions and dense appearance on the page, influenced later Dutch typography and are associated with the style later described as the "Dutch taste" (goût Hollandois).

Many of van den Keere's punches, matrices and wooden pattern letters were preserved in the Plantin printing office and survive today in the collections of the Plantin-Moretus Museum in Antwerp.

== Early life and family ==
Hendrik van den Keere was born around 1540 in Ghent, in the Spanish Netherlands (now Belgium). He was the son of the Ghent printer and schoolmaster Hendrik van den Keere the Elder. His career has sometimes been confused with that of his father, and both father and son used the French form of their name, "Henri du Tour", in some records.

Van den Keere married Elisabeth van Estelaer. The couple had several children, including Colette van den Keere (born 1568) and Pieter van den Keere (born 1571).

The family were Protestant and, during the religious conflicts in the Spanish Netherlands, moved to London in the early 1580s for religious reasons.

Their daughter Colette later became an engraver and, after her marriage to the cartographer Jodocus Hondius, helped manage the Hondius map-publishing and engraving workshop in Amsterdam. Their son Pieter became an engraver, cartographer, and publisher who worked in England and the Dutch Republic.

== Career ==
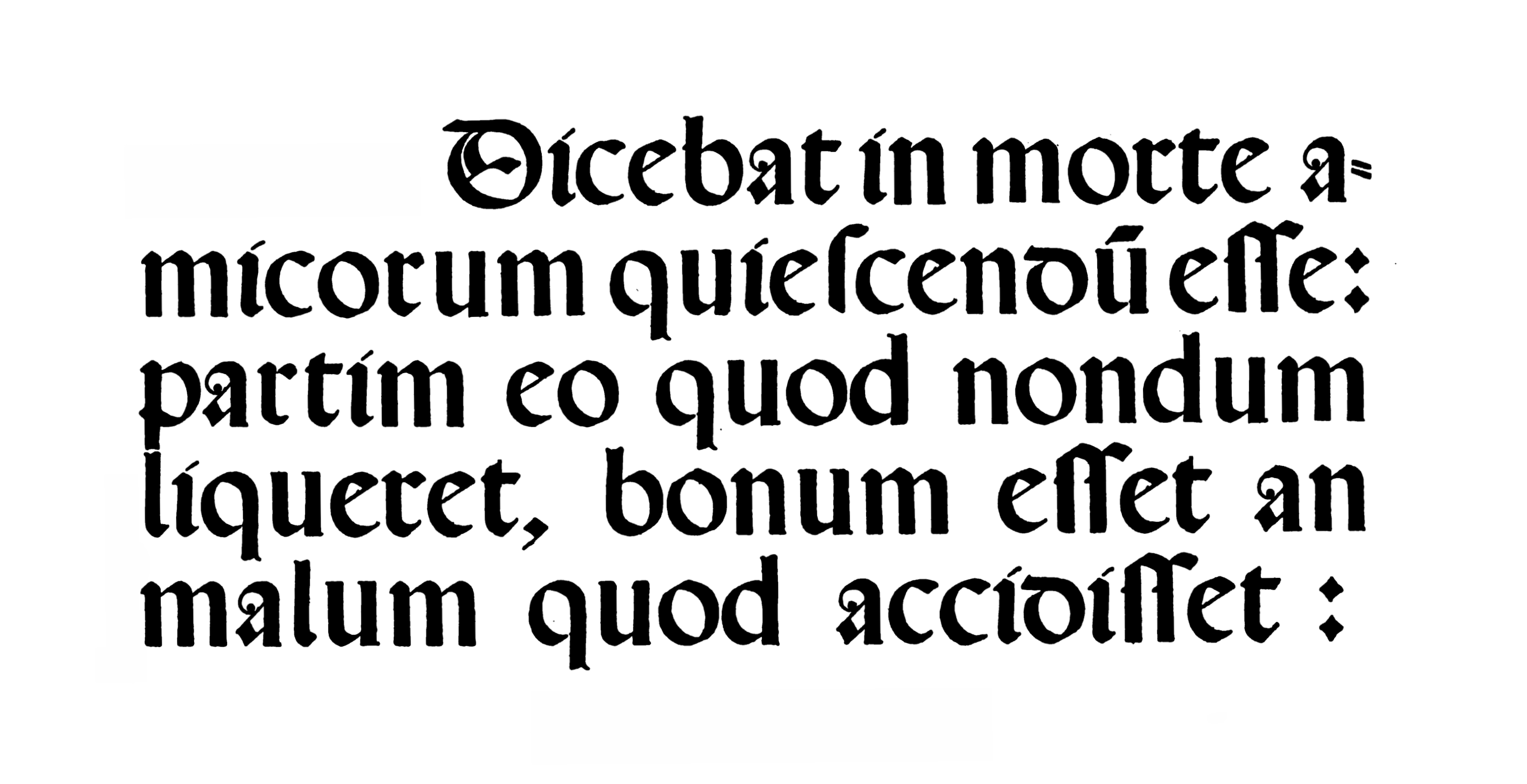
Van den Keere's Spanish-style "rotunda" Gothic

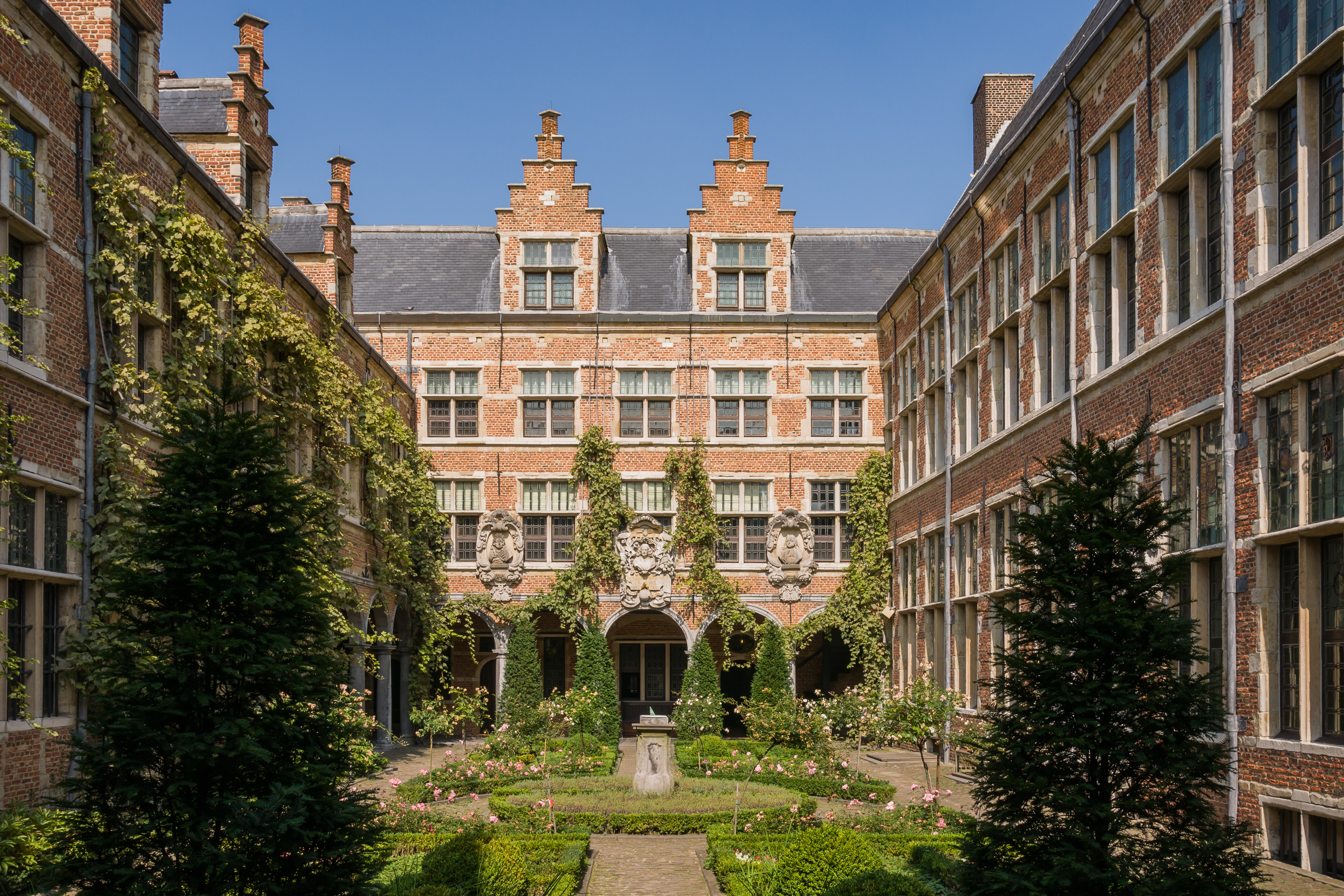
Most of van den Keere's work was for prominent printer Christophe Plantin in Antwerp. His printing office survives as the Plantin-Moretus Museum.

Van den Keere's grandfather had taken over the type foundry of Joos Lambrecht. In 1566 he took over his father's printing firm, but soon gave up printing and began to specialise in punchcutting.

From 1568 he worked particularly for Christophe Plantin of Antwerp, who operated a large printing concern by contemporary standards. Van den Keere stayed living in Ghent, up the River Scheldt from Antwerp. He was Plantin's sole typecaster from 1569 onwards.

Over the course of his career he cut around 30 typefaces.

=== Types ===
Van den Keere primarily cut punches in the textura style of blackletter, roman type and music type. Shown are some images of van den Keere's types, all from the Plantin specimen of c. 1585.

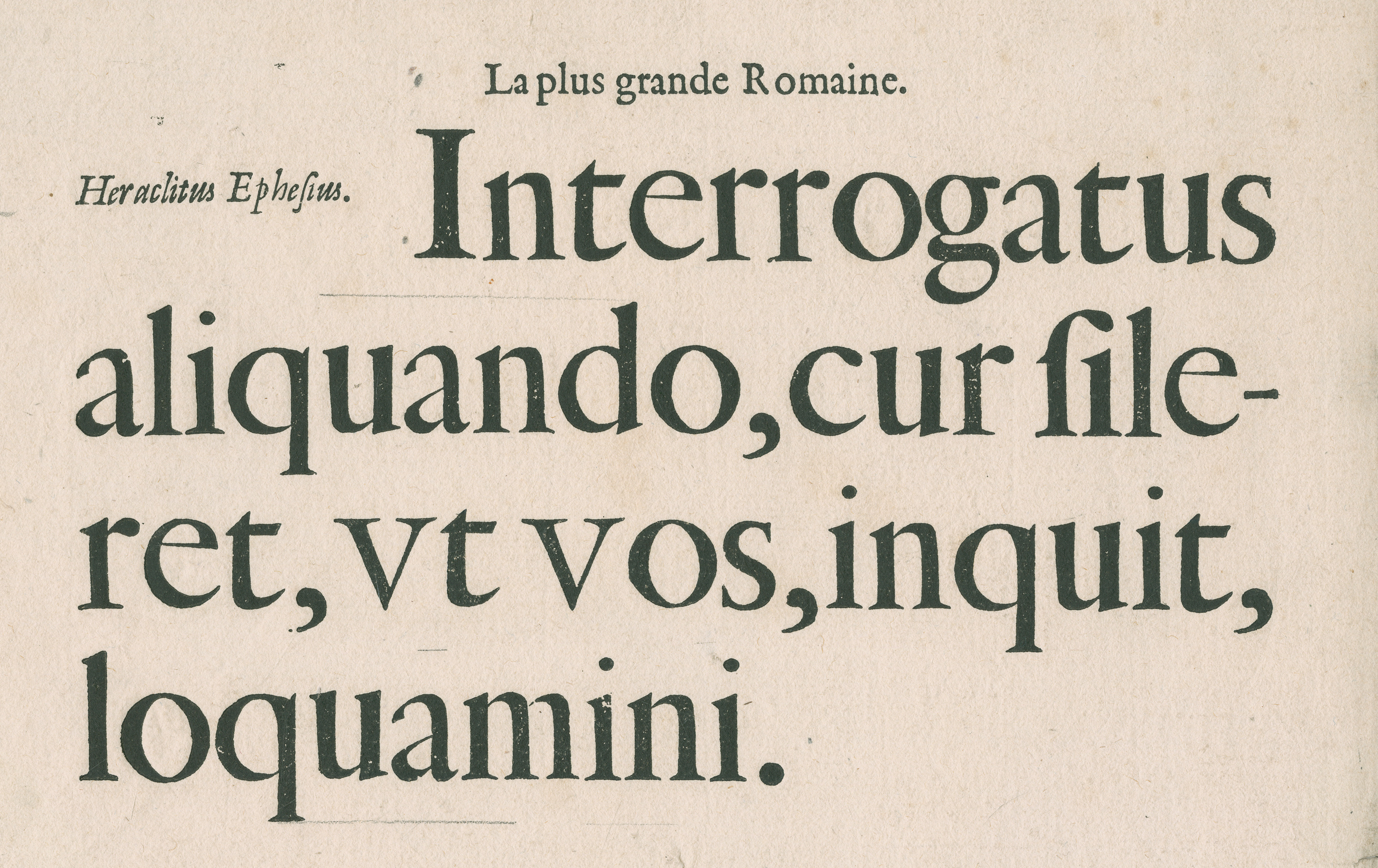
Large display type cut in wood and cast in sand.

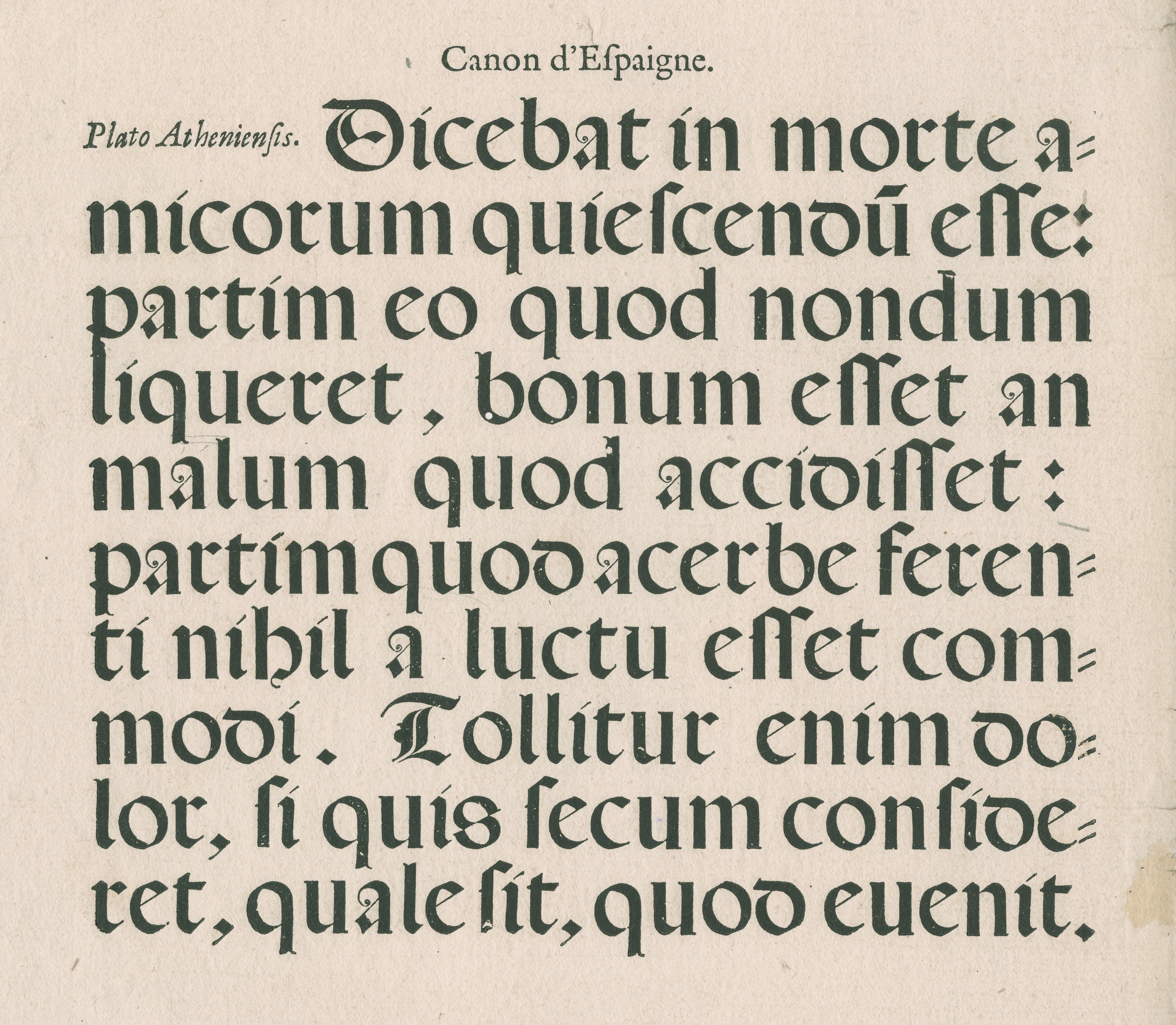
Rotunda gothic

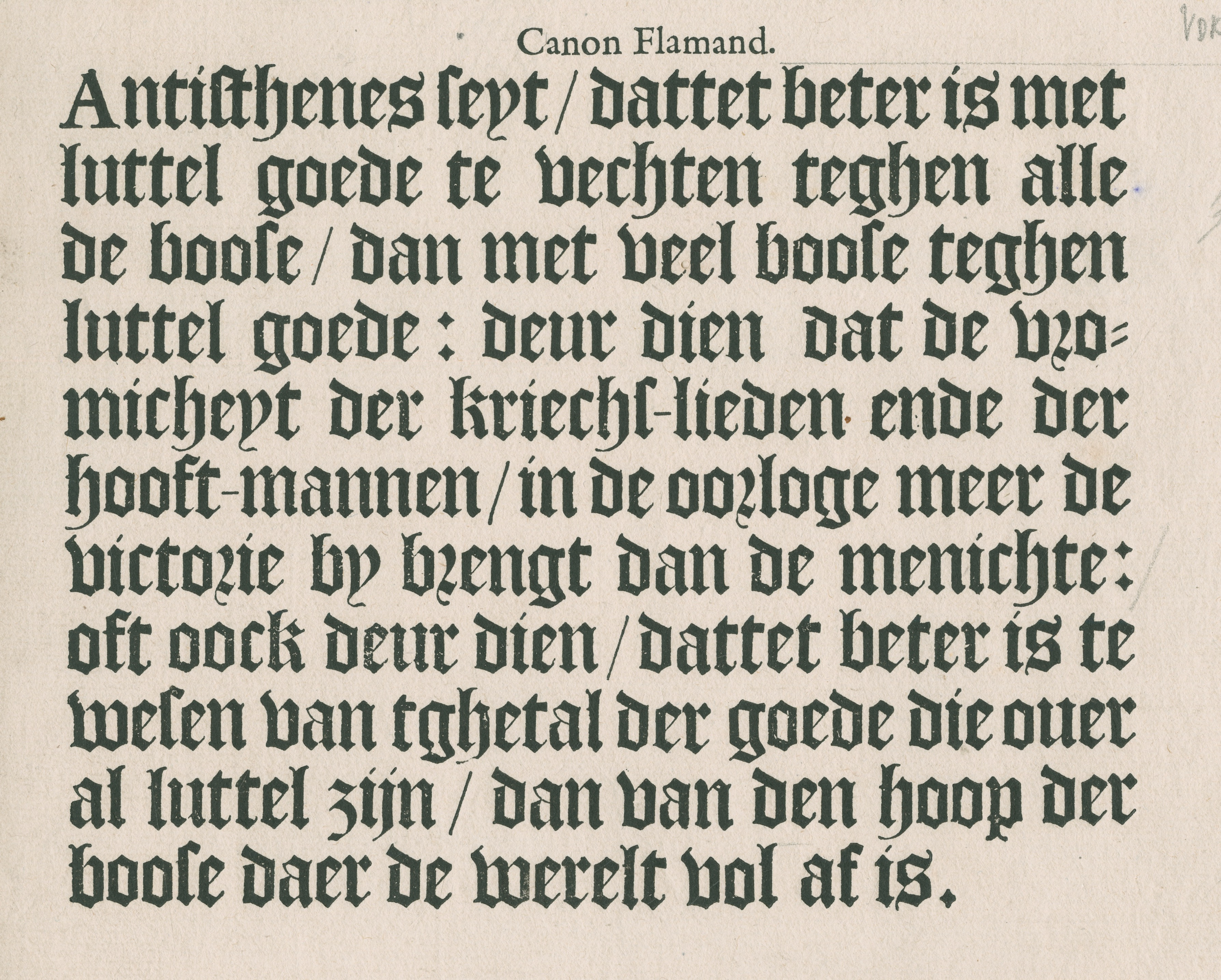
Textura blackletter

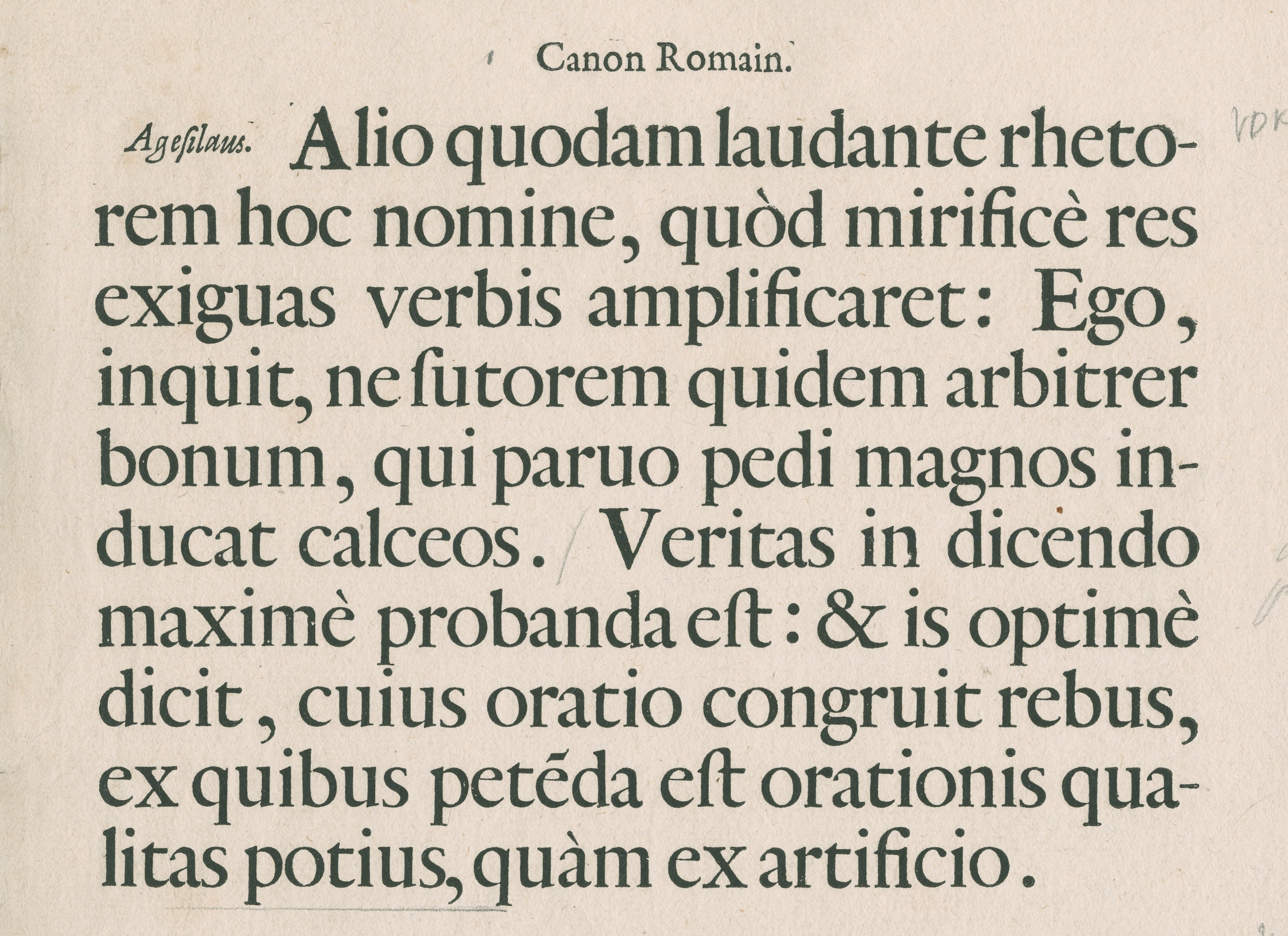
Canon Romain large roman type

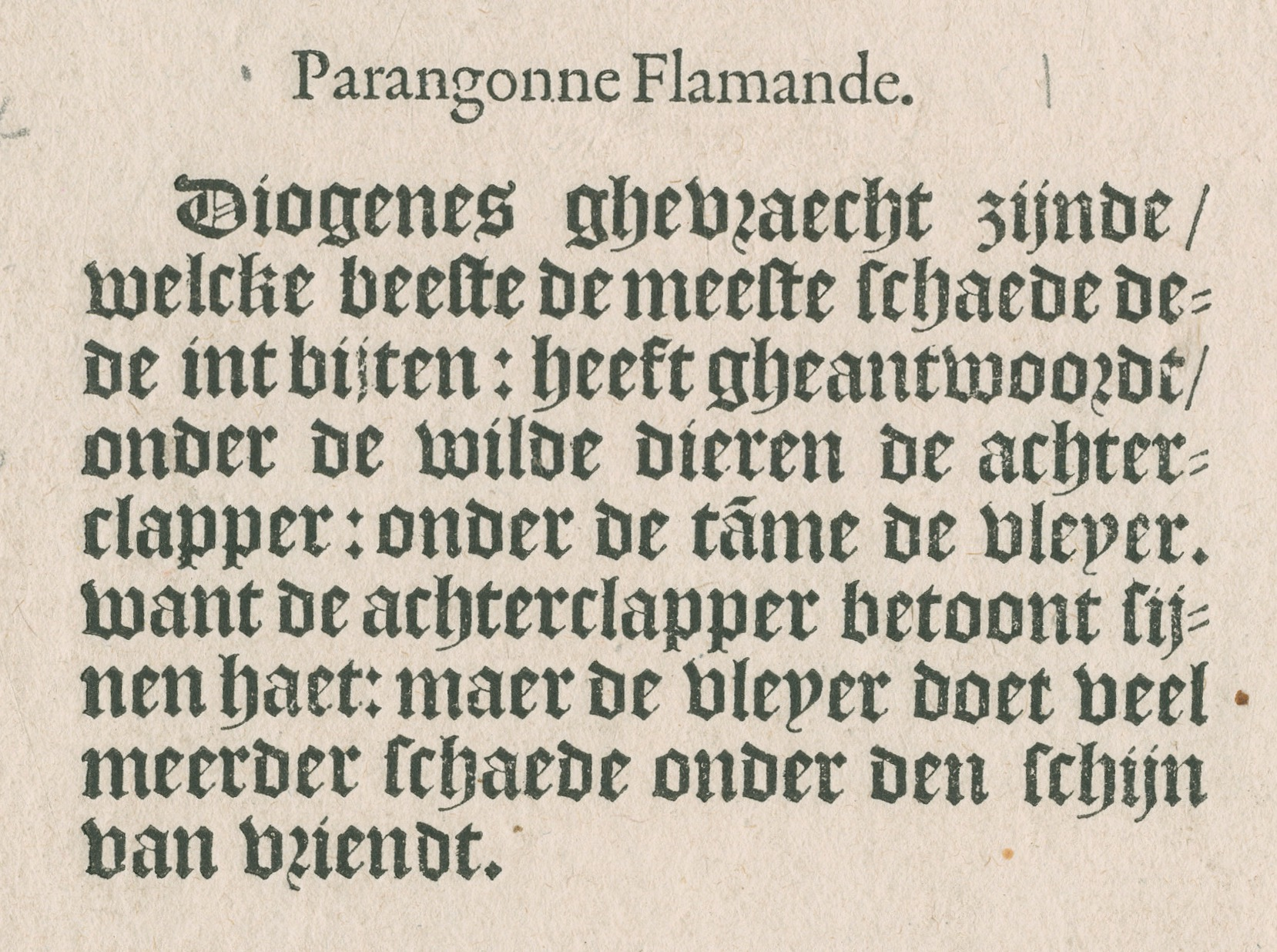
Parangonne Flamande (Flemish-style) textura blackletter

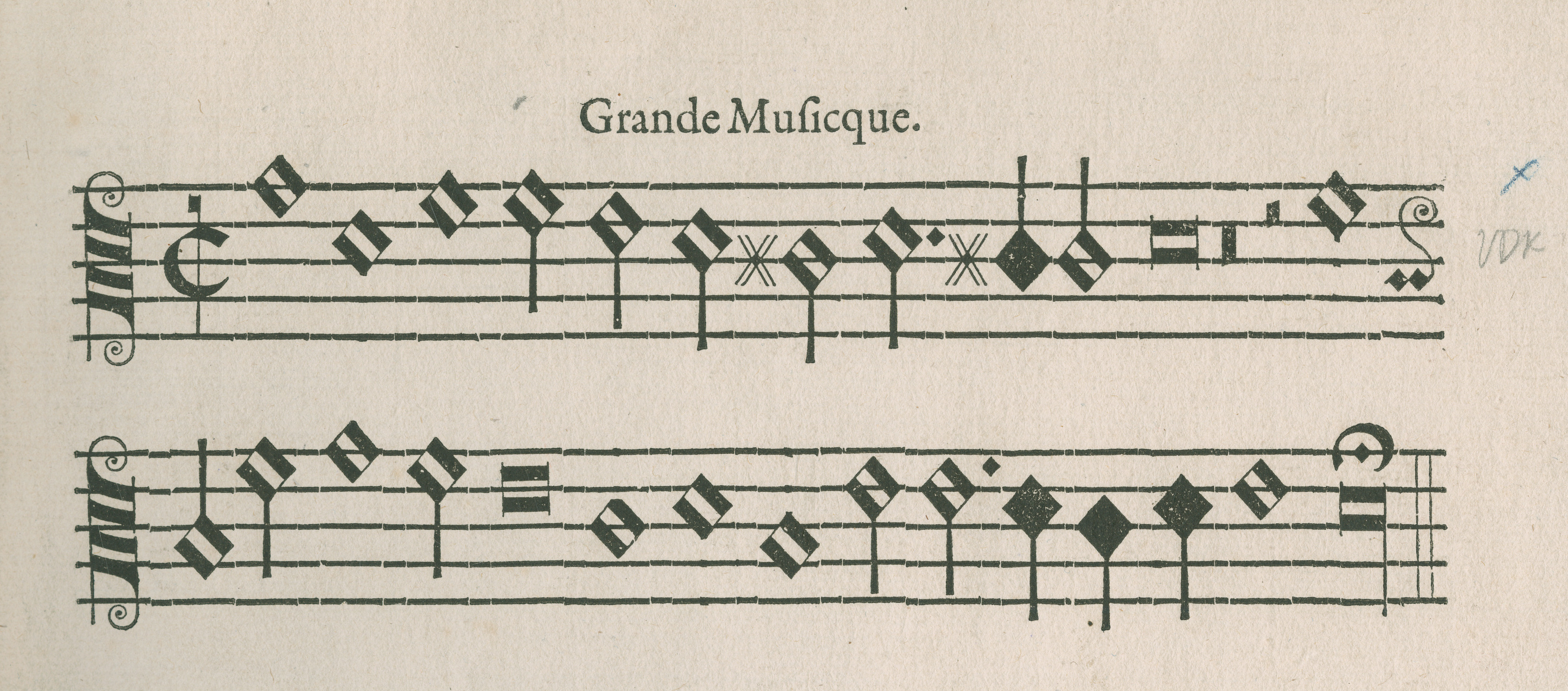
Grande Musicque music type

The largest roman types cut by van den Keere had very bold proportions, a high x-height and a dense type colour on the page, much bolder than earlier types in the Garamond style. This style remained popular in the Low Countries after his death; the standard term for it is "Dutch taste" or goût Hollandois, the description used by Pierre-Simon Fournier for it. Hendrik Vervliet has suggested that the goal was to create roman type "comparable for weight with Gothic letters" at a time when blackletter was still very popular for continuous reading in body text. His Gros canon was used by Plantin in his 1574 Commune sanctorum, a church liturgy choirbook intended to be readable at a distance by an entire choir. John A. Lane comments that his roman types "must be accepted as a major innovation...[they] influenced the seventeenth-century Dutch types that in turn influenced types in England and elsewhere" although Leon Voet felt that they "never quite equaled the elegance of his French models".

As influences on his types, Lane suggests types by Ameet Tavernier, Robert Granjon and Pierre Haultin, and Vervliet an earlier type cut by Maarten de Keyser. His body text type in contrast is more similar to earlier French types by the established French engravers such as Claude Garamond and Granjon.

One of the more striking features of van den Keere's largest roman types is considerable variation in proportions to modern eyes: letters like 'n' and 'u' are very narrow while round letters such as 'o' stay near-circular. Digital font designer Fred Smeijers speculates that van den Keere wanted to "make the type economical" with the letters that could be compressed, while at the time it would not be normal to condense the circular letters: "it was to be two centuries" before truly condensed types which condensed all letters. Smeijers noted that van den Keere's style could not be an accident as he "could work perfectly in the French tradition" when he wanted to, when cutting smaller types.

Van den Keere also cut a rotunda gothic type, apparently based on Spanish lettering and intended for a book to be sent to Spain, a Civilité and in Lane's view probably a spectacular set of Gothic capitals used as initials with an intricate, interlaced (Dutch: gestricte) design. (Note: There is a reproduction in Charles Enschede's book; see link.) He is not known to have cut any italic types, which were not popular in the Netherlands during the 1570s. His largest types were cut in wood and then duplicated by sand casting.

Besides his own types, he justified matrices (setting their spacing) from other engravers, cut replacement characters for some of Plantin's types with shorter ascenders and descenders to allow tighter linespacing, and in 1572 compiled an inventory for Plantin of the types Plantin owned. Van den Keere also owned matrices for type by other engravers, at the end of his life owning three roman types by Claude Garamond, two romans by Ameet Tavernier, and six italics and a music type by Robert Granjon.

Many of van den Keere's punches, matrices and wooden pattern letters survive at the Plantin-Moretus Museum:

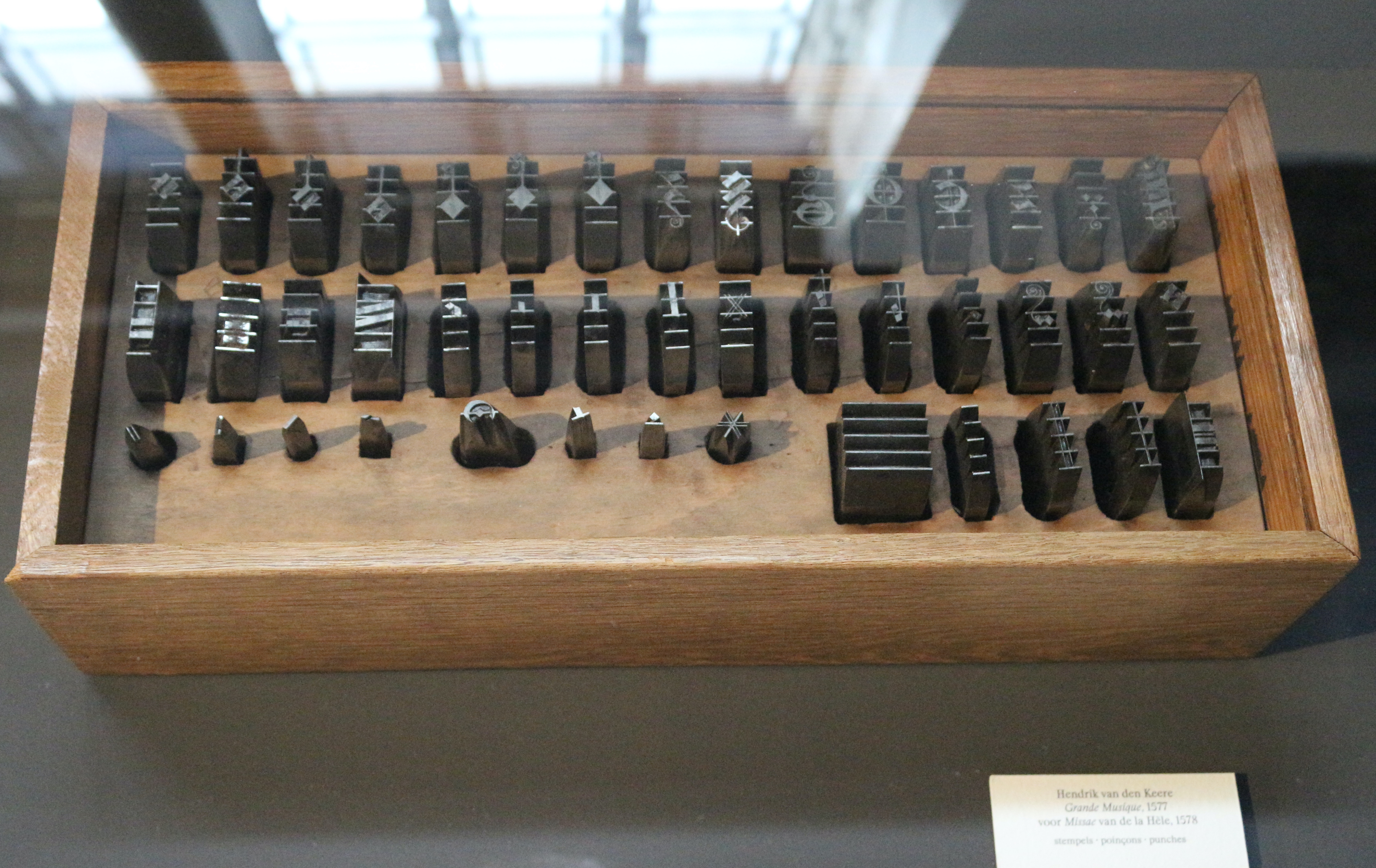
van den Keere's Grande Musique punches in the Plantin-Moretus Museum

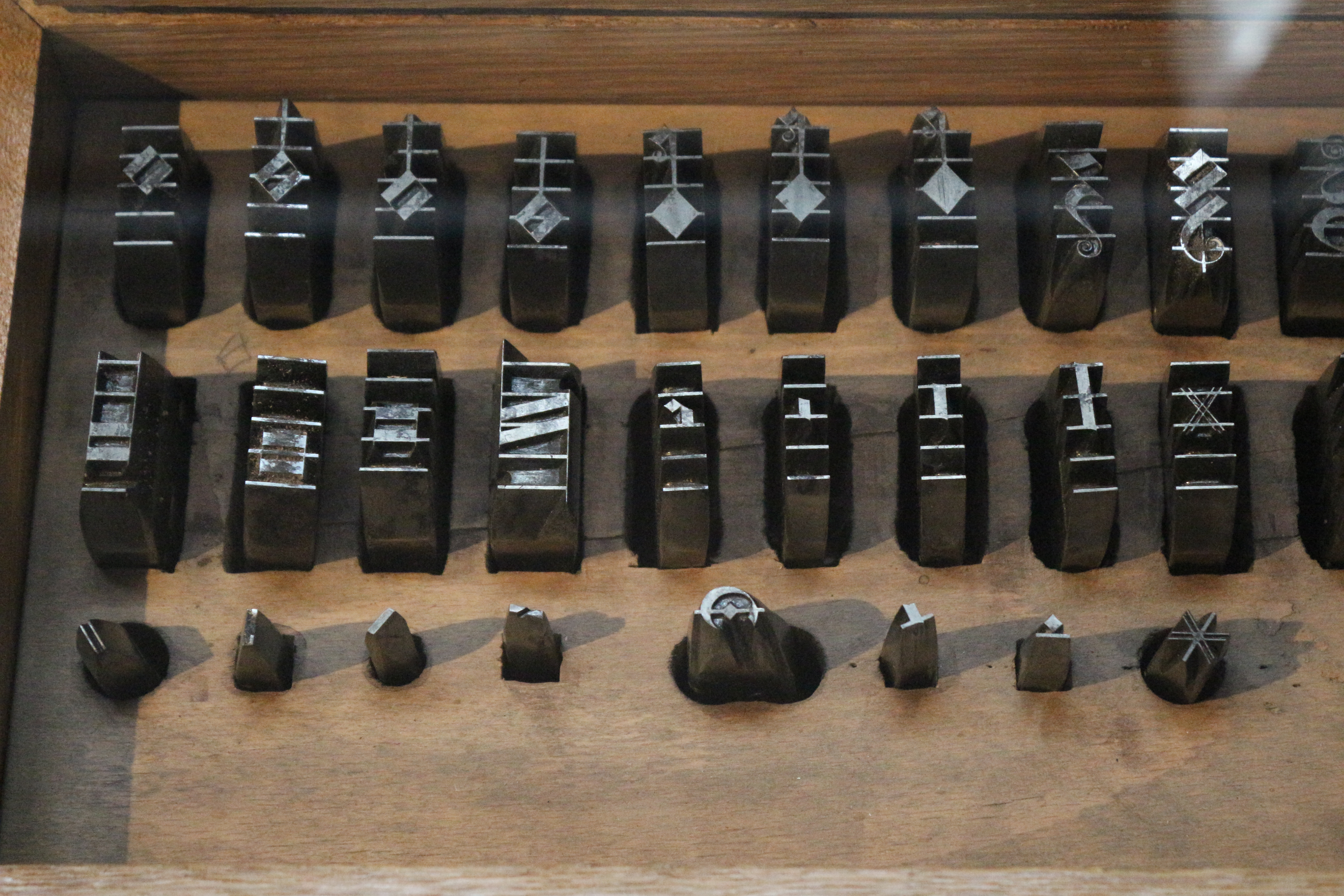
Grande Musique punches, detail view

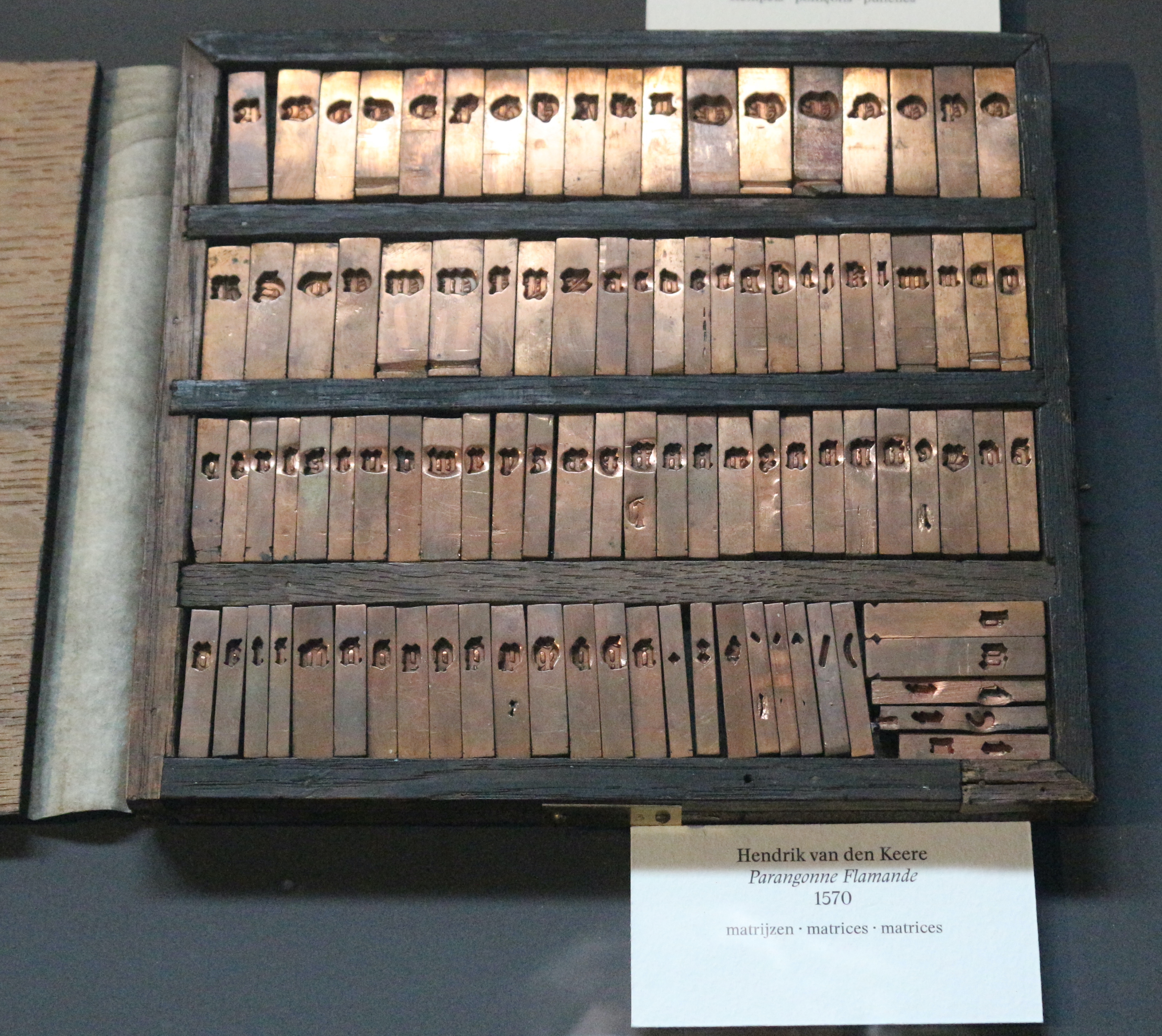
The Parangonne Flamande blackletter matrices

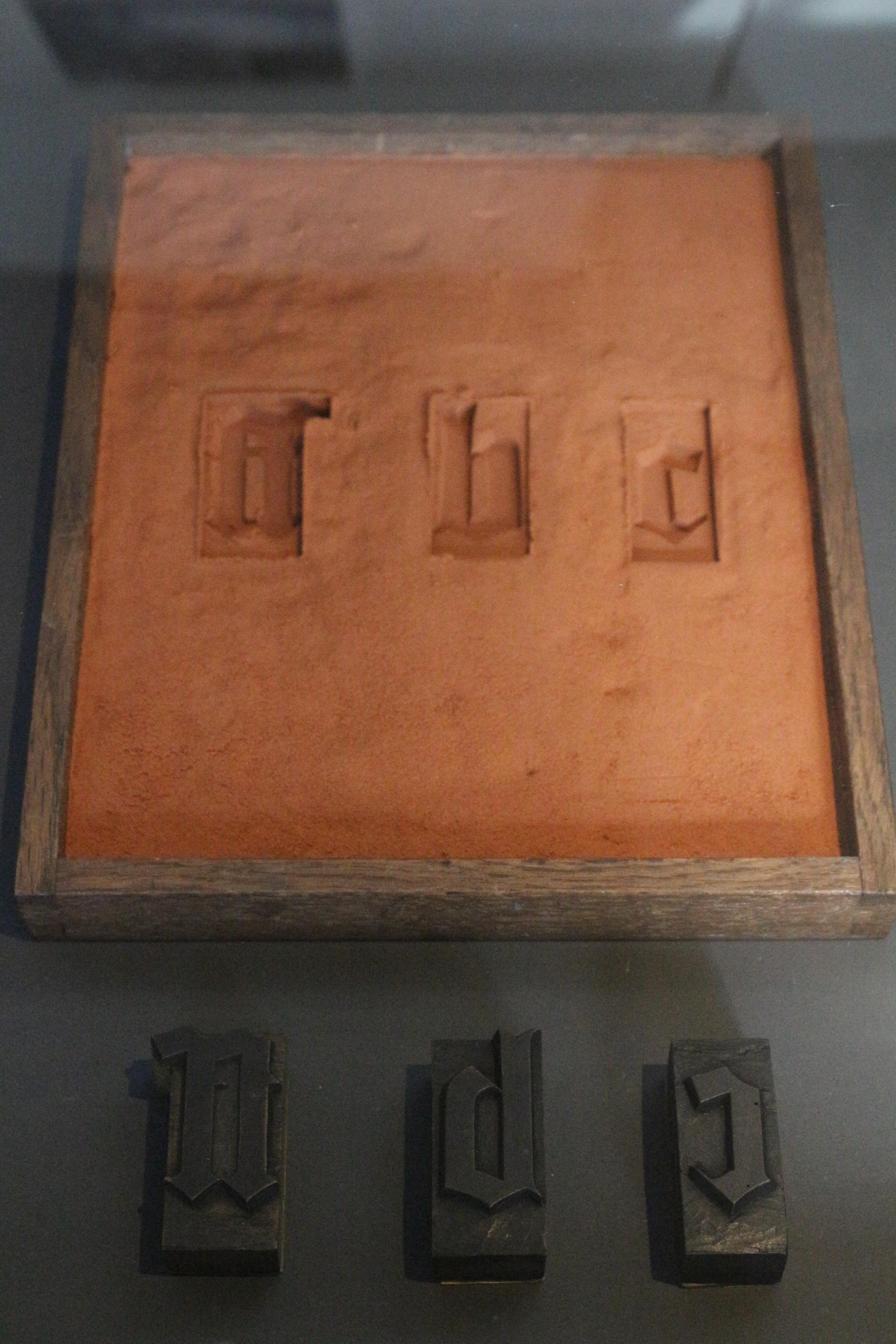
Demonstration in the Plantin-Moretus Museum of sandcasting from wooden pattern letters.

== Death ==
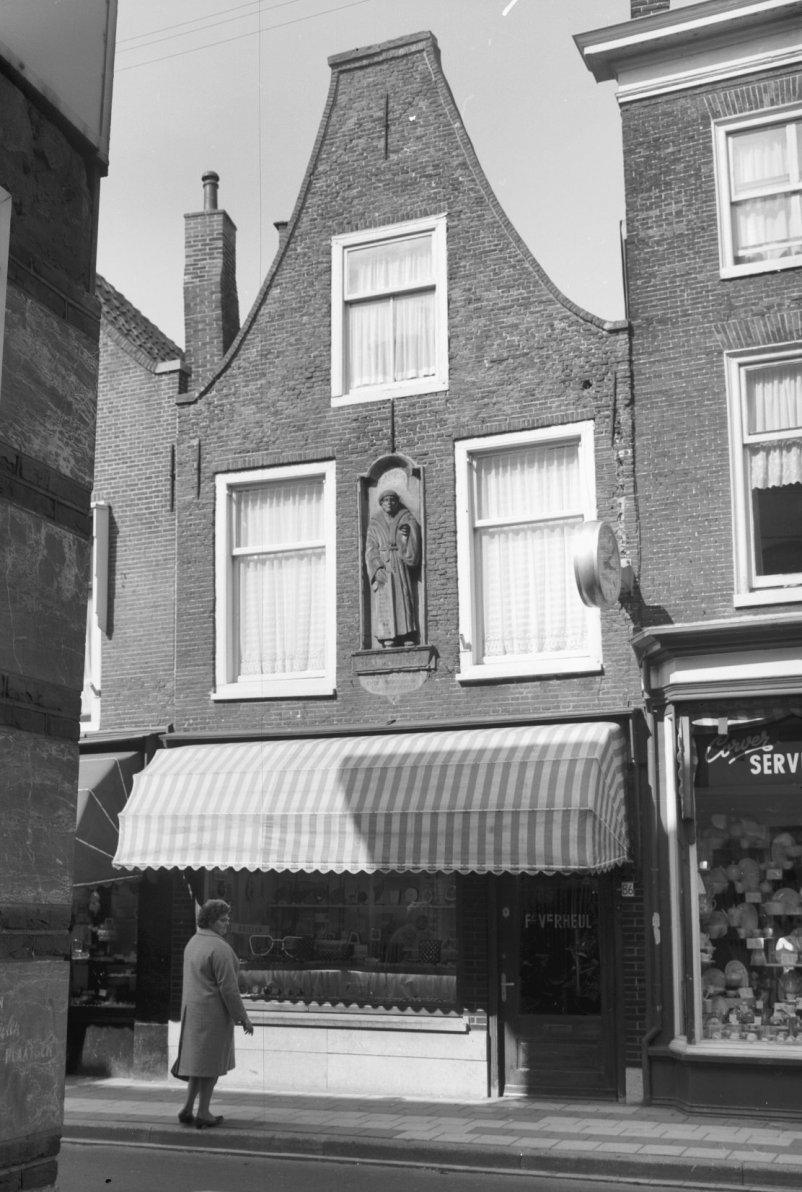
Many of van den Keere's materials became owned by Leiden typefounder Arent Corsz Hogenacker, whose premises (seen in 1963) are now a shop. In 1630 he commissioned this statue for the building of Laurens Janszoon Coster, subject of the now-debunked Dutch claim to the invention of printing.

Hendrik van den Keere died in 1580, probably in his late thirties. In one of his final surviving letters to the printer Christophe Plantin, he mentioned suffering from a serious leg injury. Later historians have suggested that this injury may have contributed to his early death.

== Legacy ==
After van den Keere's death in 1580, many of his punches and matrices were sold by his widow to the printer Christophe Plantin in 1581. Plantin's successors preserved the materials and records of the printing office, which later became the Plantin-Moretus Museum in Antwerp. A large number of van den Keere's punches, matrices and wooden pattern letters survive there today.

Some of van den Keere's materials were also acquired by his foreman, Thomas de Vechter, whose purchase from the widow was recorded in a surviving inventory. De Vechter later established a type foundry in Antwerp and subsequently in Leiden, where many of van den Keere's designs continued to be cast. The foundry was later taken over by the typefounder Arent Corsz Hogenacker between 1619 and 1623. When Hogenacker's foundry closed in 1672, the types passed into other Dutch foundries, helping to circulate van den Keere's designs more widely.

Matrices for van den Keere's interlaced capital letters later came into the possession of the type foundry of Koninklijke Joh. Enschedé.

Some of van den Keere's designs continued in use long after his death. A close copy of his Gros Canon capitals was used in Spain for more than a century. A later version cut around 1686 by the punchcutter Pedro Disses, in a two-line great primer size, remained in use until the late eighteenth century, particularly in Andalusia.

=== Digital fonts ===
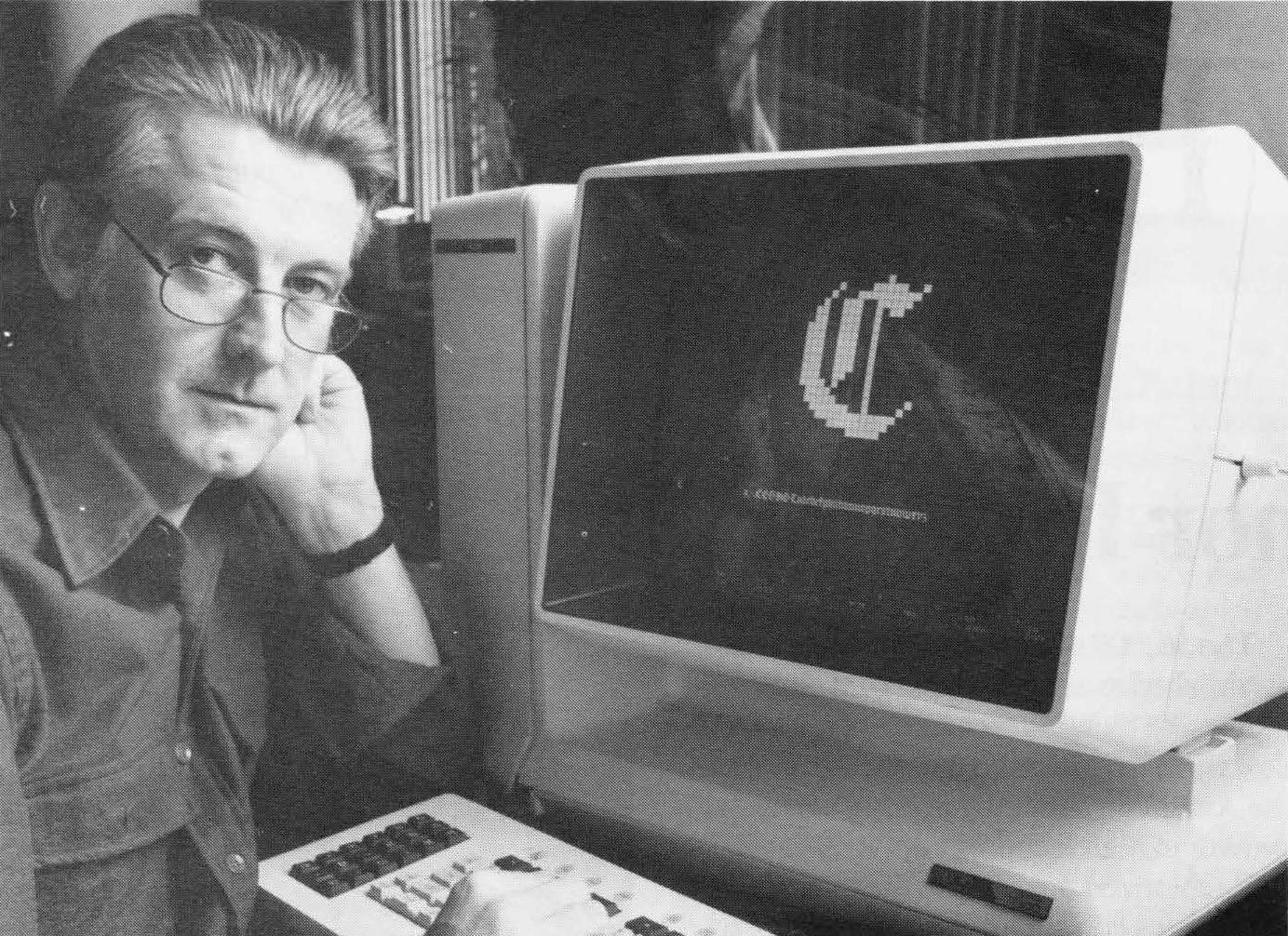
Type designer Matthew Carter showing his DTL Flamande typeface, based on van den Keere's Textura

Digital font designers who have designed interpretations of van den Keere's roman type include Frank E. Blokland whose company Dutch Type Library (DTL) has published revivals of his roman types under the names DTL Vandenkeere and DTL Gros Canon for a display size; DTL Vandenkeere is used in signage at the Plantin-Moretus Museum. DTL has also published Flamande by Matthew Carter, a revival of his textura. In 2016 Blokland received a doctorate on the spacing and proportions of early metal type, including van den Keere's, from Leiden University.

Kris Sowersby, whose Heldane typeface is based on van den Keere's work, describes it as "dense, sharp and powerful...I love van den Keere’s texturas. I can feel the influence of them within his roman forms: they’re both narrow, dense and sharp". Hoefler & Co.'s release notes for its Quarto typeface describe van den Keere's Two-Line Double Pica display-sized roman (shown above; size is around 42pt) as "an arresting design marked by striking dramatic tensions"; designer Sara Soskolne has said that she was attracted to "its crispness, its drama" but noted that they removed details such as the wide horizontal of the centre bar of the 'E' which she felt did not work.

Fred Smeijers, whose TEFF Renard typeface is based on his work, felt that basing a typeface on his work produced a "solid and sturdy variant of the Garamond style" and that he was "one of the first to make roman display types that were explicitly conceived as such."

== Sources ==
- Carter, Harry (2002). Mosley, James (ed.). A View of Early Typography Up to About 1600 (Reprinted ed.). London: Hyphen. ISBN 978-0-907259-21-3.
- Enschedé, Charles (1978). Carter, Harry; Hellinga, Lotte (eds.). Typefoundries in the Netherlands, from the fifteenth to the nineteenth century: a history based mainly on material in the collection of Joh. Enschedé en Zonen at Haarlem (2nd ed.). Haarlem: Stichting Museum Enschedé. p. 56. ISBN 9789070024130.
- Lane, John A. (2004). Early Type Specimens in the Plantin-Moretus Museum: annotated descriptions of the specimens to ca. 1850 (mostly from the Low Countries and France) with preliminary notes on the typefoundries and printing offices (1. ed.). New Castle, Del.: Oak Knoll Press. pp. 41–42. ISBN 9781584561392.
- Middendorp, Jan (2004). Dutch Type. 010 Publishers. pp. 18–19, 243. ISBN 978-90-6450-460-0.
- Smeijers, Fred (1999). "Renard: an idiosyncratic type revival". Quaerendo. 29 (1): 52–60. doi:10.1163/157006999X00077.
- Vervliet, Hendrik D. L. (1968). Sixteenth-Century printing types of the Low Countries. Houten: Hes & De Graaf. pp. 30–32, 64–67, 178. ISBN 9789061948599.
- Vervliet, Hendrik D. L.; Carter, Harry, eds. (1972). Type Specimen Facsimiles II. University of Toronto Press. pp. 7–11.
- Vervliet, Hendrik D. L. (2008). The Palaeotypography of the French Renaissance: Selected Papers on Sixteenth-century Typefaces. BRILL. pp. 230, 352. ISBN 978-90-04-16982-1.
