= Jacques François Rosart =

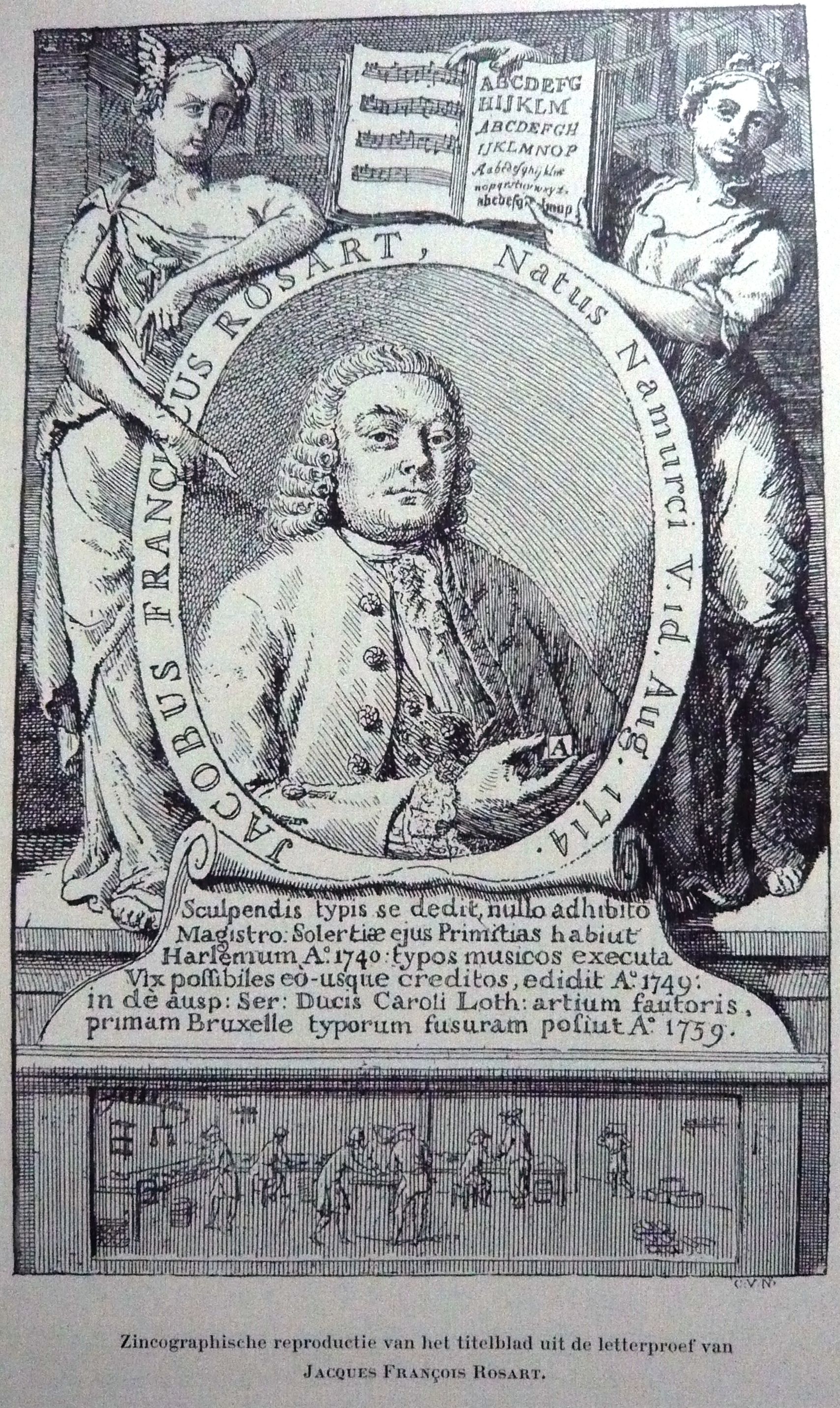
Portrait by Cornelis van Noorde

Jacques François Rosart (1714, Namur – 26 May 1777) was a punchcutter, engraver and founder of metal type from the Austrian Netherlands (modern Belgium).

Rosart operated a successful type foundry in Brussels after arriving in the city in 1759, and before that worked in Haarlem. His typefaces were in the "transitional" style, and he also made script typefaces, which he called a Financière style, music typefaces and shadowed capitals.

Digital typefaces based on Rosart's work have been published.
