= John A. Lane =

American writer and historian

John Lane
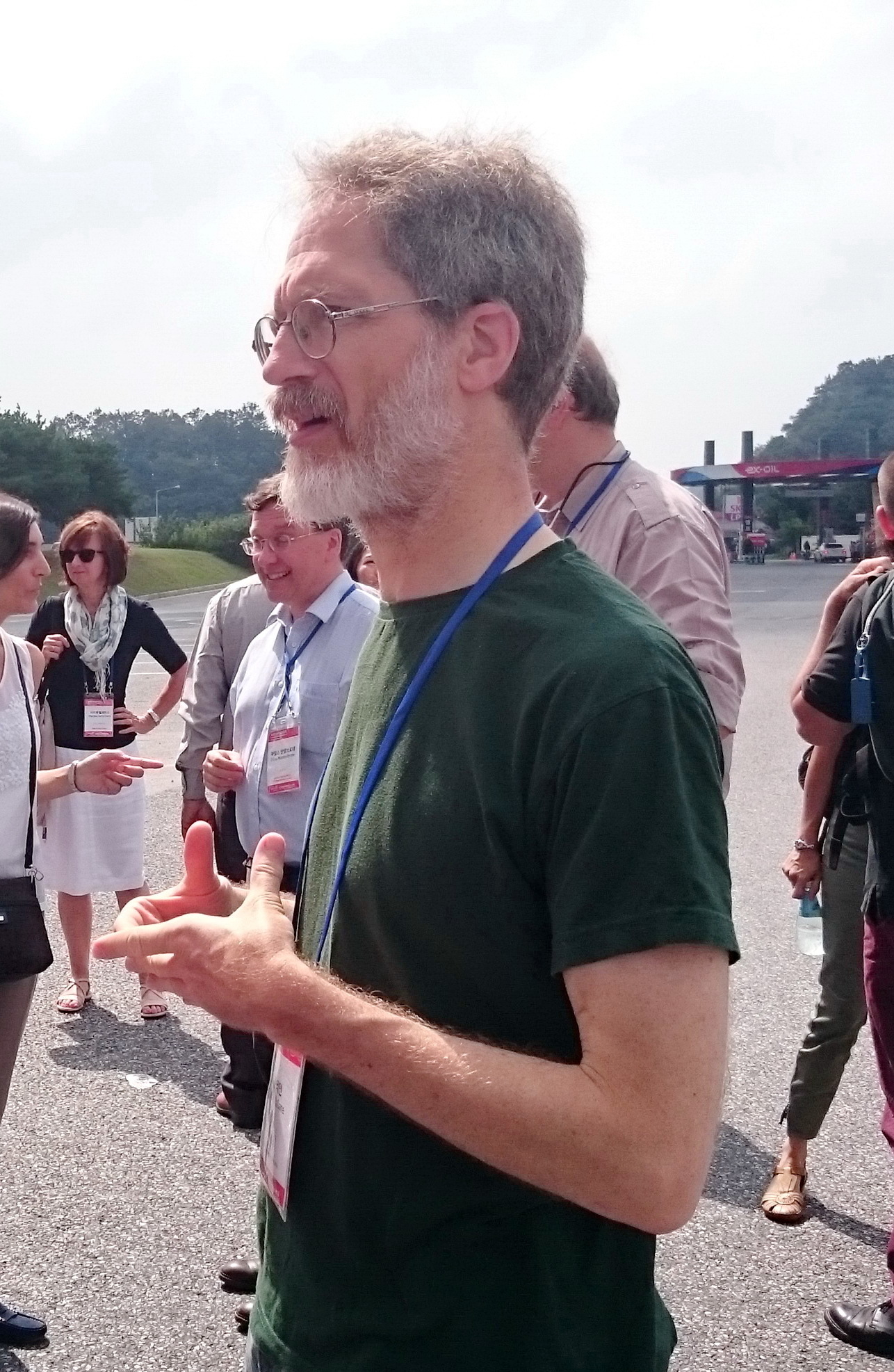
- Lane in 2016
- Born: 1955 (age 70–71)
- Writing career
- Notable awards: 2003 Fellowship of the American Printing History Association; 2006 Guggenheim Fellowship

John A. Lane (born 1955) is an American writer and historian of printing living in The Netherlands. Lane received the 2003 Fellowship of the American Printing History Association and is particularly known for his writing on Dutch printing history and figures including Nicolaes Briot, Christoffel van Dijck and Miklós Kis.

Lane studied physics at Yale University and became interested in printing through working on a printing press at the university. After working in font digitization for Autologic, he moved to Europe. He has written books on the history of printing in Armenian, an edition of the 1768 type specimen showcase of the Enschedé type foundry, and on materials in the collections of the Plantin-Moretus Museum and the University of Amsterdam and worked as a historical consultant for Adobe Systems.
