= Pierre Haultin =

French printer and publisher

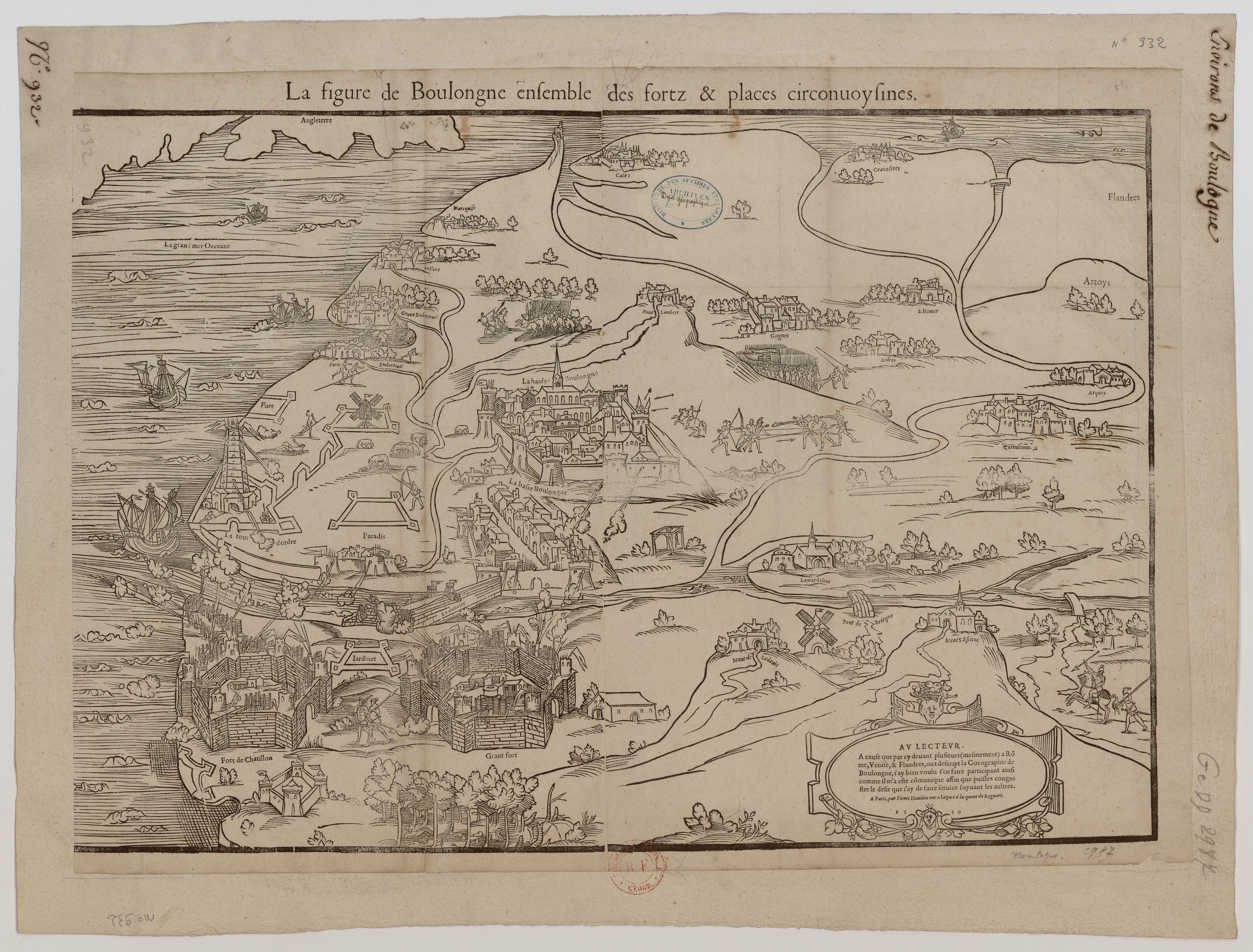
Plan of Boulogne-sur-Mer printed by Pierre Haultin, 1550

Pierre Haultin (c. 1510 – 1587) was a French printer, publisher, punchcutter and typefounder.

He was the nephew of the famous Parisian women printer Charlotte Guillard. As a punchcutter, he may have been trained by Claude Garamont, who worked for Guillard. He started his career as a typefounder, a woodcutter and a bookseller in Paris around 1545.

A French Calvinist, Haultin left Paris for Lyon and Geneva in 1550, and then ran a printing office in La Rochelle from 1571 to 1587. Haultin engraved many typefaces, including romans, italics, Greek and music type, which were widely used across Europe; his nephew Jerome Haultin lived in London from around 1568 and sold his types there.
