= Enschedé =

Enschedé can refer to the following articles:

- Enschede, a city in the east of the Netherlands
- Royal Joh. Enschedé, a Dutch printing company of secure documents
- Museum Enschedé

The following people carried the surname Enschedé:

- Izaak Enschedé (1681–1761), Dutch printer and founder of Royal Joh. Enschedé Father of Johannes Enschedé (1708-1780)
- Johannes Enschedé (1708-1780), Dutch printer and co-owner of Royal Joh. Enschedé, father of Johannes Enschedé (1750-1799)
- Johannes Enschedé Jr. (1750–1799), Dutch lawyer and printer, father of Johannes Enschedé (1785-1866)
- Johannes Enschedé III (1785–1866), Dutch politician and printer
- Jan Justus Enschedé (1807–1887), Dutch lawyer and printer; also sometimes Janus Justus Enschedé
- Adriaan Justus Enschedé (1829–1896), Dutch lawyer and printer, grandson of Johannes Enschedé (1750-1799)
