= Johannes Enschedé =

Johannes Enschedé may refer to:

- Johannes Enschedé (printer, born 1708) (1708–1780), Dutch printer and collector, owner and son of the founder of Royal Joh. Enschedé
- Johannes Enschedé II (1750–1799), Dutch regent and collector, son of the above
- Johannes Enschedé III (1785–1866), Dutch newspaper editor and printer, son of the above
- Johannes Enschedé IV (1811–1878), Dutch newspaper editor and printer, son of the above
- Joh. Enschedé, a printing company based in Haarlem, Netherlands
