= Johanna Elisabeth Swaving =

Dutch businesswoman and publisher

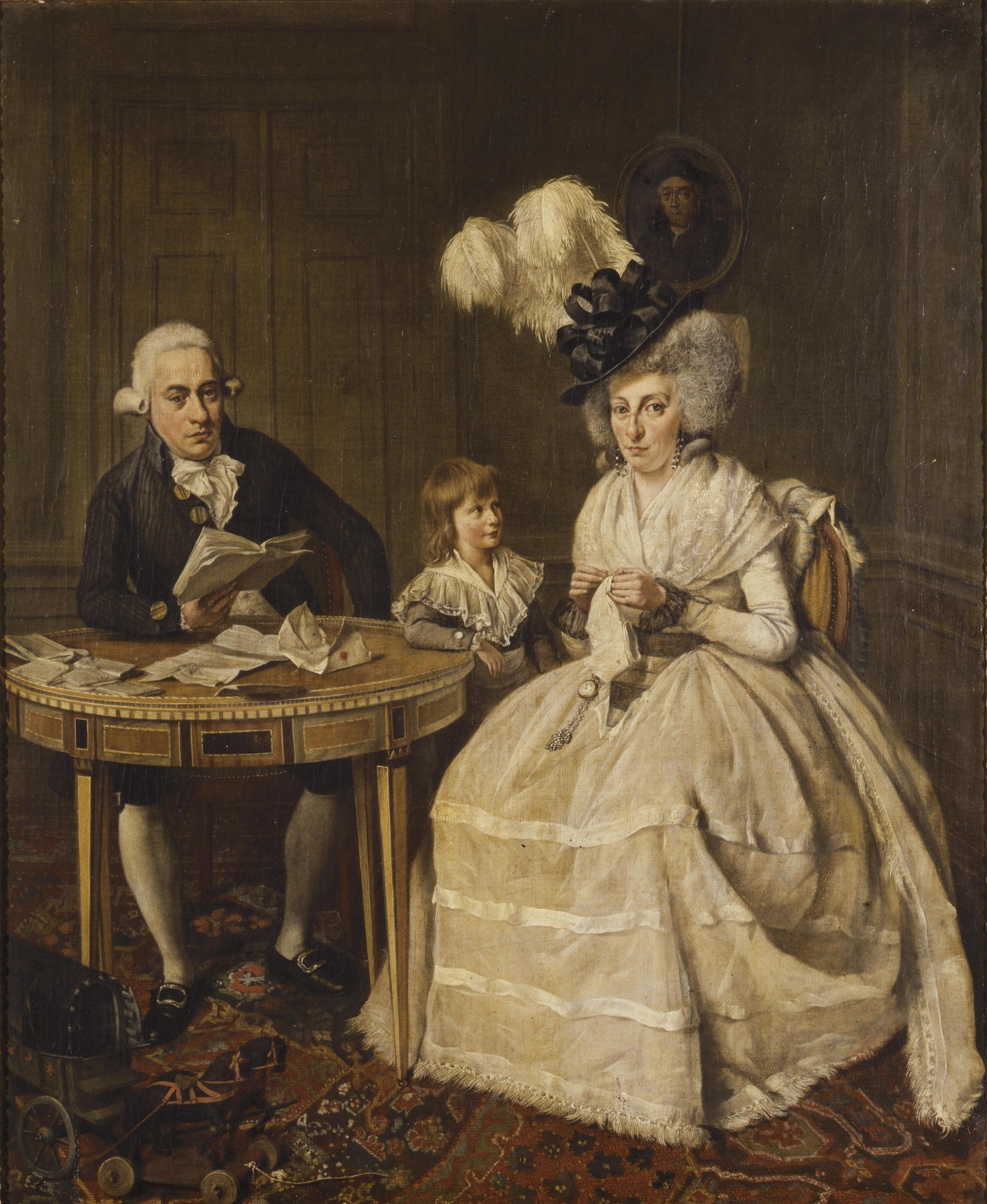
- Johanna Swaving with his husband Johannes Enschedé II and their son Johannes Enschedé III by Wybrand Hendricks, 1796
- Born: 17 December 1754; Weesp, Dutch Republic
- Died: 26 June 1826 (aged 71); Haarlem, Netherlands
- Occupations: Publisher; printer
- Spouse: Johannes Enschedé II (m. 1783; died 1799)
- Children: 7, including Johannes III
- Parents: Christiaan Swaving (father); Sandrina van Poolsum
- Relatives: Adriaan Enschedé (grandson)

Johanna Elisabeth Swaving (Weesp, 17 December 1754 – Haarlem, 26 June 1826), was a Dutch businesswoman and publisher of the Oprechte Haerlemsche Courant.

== Biography ==
She was born in Weesp as the daughter of the mayor of Weesp Christiaan Swaving and Sandrina Gerarda van Poolsum. She married Johannes Enschedé Jr., partner of the publishing and typesetting company Joh. Enschedé, on 25 August 1783 in Weesp. They had 4 daughters and 3 sons who survived infancy.

After her husband's death in 1799 she continued his business, especially the local newspaper, which had been wholly owned by her husband. In this role she was able to exercise influence out over a wider community than just Haarlem, in the name of her family's company, which she managed on behalf of her sons. She was a benefactor for the Nederlandsche Maatschappij van Kunsten en Wetenschappen, the Haarlemse Teken-Academie, and the actor's club Leerzaam Vermaak where she acted in 1791 with her husband and son in Jan van Walré’s Menschenhaat en berouw (a play after Menschenhass und Reue (Misanthropy and Repentance), by August von Kotzebue). In 1820 she was one of six leading women of Haarlem who set up a fund to help needy pregnant women receive medical help during their confinement called Caring Committee for pregnant women. The fund still exists today.

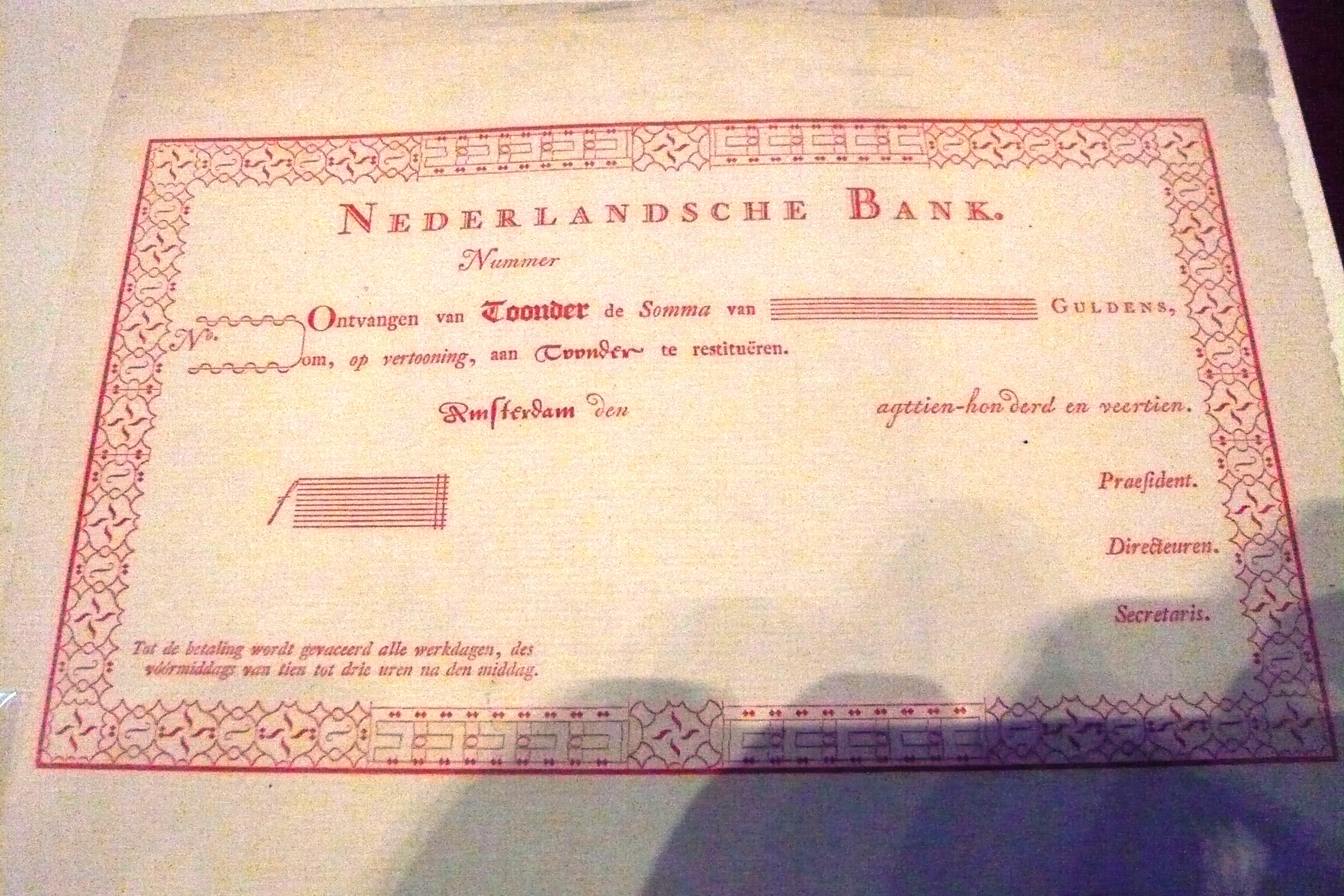
The first Dutch banknote called Roodborstje, featuring the decorative edges with the "Pearl music" font

In her role as leader of Joh. Enschedé, she discovered new ways to publicize the company's distinctive talents as font owners by using the Enschedé fonts in advertisements in her newspaper. It was her idea to use the expensive flop called "Parel muziek", a font developed by Joan Michael Fleischman, as a way of creating decorative edging around visiting cards, newspaper advertisements, and invitations. One of her programmes for her local theatre group used a decorative edging that became the model for the Netherlands first banknote, which was printed by Enschedé in 1814. She probably won the contract for printing the first banknote through her social contacts in Haarlem with Johanna Borski, the main funder for the De Nederlandsche Bank, as well as Jan Hodshon, the uncle of Catharina Cornelia Hodshon, who was one of the first directors of the bank. Enschedé remained the sole printer of Dutch banknotes up until the introduction of the euro.

She is known for setting up the management of the Enschedé firm (newspaper, publishing, and banknotes), though she was omitted from the company's later memorial publications such as Enschedé gedenkschrift 1743–1893. She died in Haarlem.

== See also ==
- List of women printers and publishers before 1800
