= Jacobus Enschedé =

Jacobus Enschedé I (19 March 1753 in Haarlem –1 January 1783 in Haarlem) was a Haarlem newspaper editor and printer.

== Biography ==
He was a son of Johannes Enschedé and Helena Hoefnagel. For some time he was a partner in the family company. On 7 September 1779 in Haarlem he married Gertruida Elisabeth van Oosten de Bruyn (Haarlem, 6 June 1759 –Velsen, 24 October 1810) the daughter of Mr. Gerrit Willem van Oosten de Bruyn and Maria Croon. He had no descendants in the company.
