= Jan Justus Enschedé =

Newspaper editor from the Netherlands (1807–1887)

Jan Justus Enschedé (1807 in Haarlem – 1887 in Haarlem) was a newspaper editor and printer in Haarlem, the Netherlands.

He was the great great grandson of the founder of the Joh. Enschedé company, and the son of Jacobus Enschedé II. Like his second cousin and mentor Johannes Enschedé III, he was a member of the Dutch Society of Science and the Teylers Second Society. He worked for Enschedé III as editor of the Opregte Haarlemsche Courant from 1829, later joined by Johannes Enschedé IV. In 1850, they had a quarrel with the city council of Haarlem over the use of the city coat of arms in the newspaper. As city publisher, they had the right, but Haarlem withdrew this privilege, claiming ownership. Jan Justus wrote a book explaining the case of Enschedé, which they won. In the 1860s the paper was considered the best in the country and attracted editors such as Conrad Busken Huet and Multatuli.
