= Abraham Enschedé =

Dutch newspaper editor and printer

Abraham Enschedé (20 March 1760 – 2 August 1820) was a Dutch newspaper editor and printer.

== Biography ==
Enschedé was born and died in Haarlem. He was a son of Johannes Enschedé and Helena Hoefnagel. For some time he was a partner in the family company. On 31 October 1785 in Weesp he married Sandrina Christina Swaving (Rio de Berbice 25 December 1768–Haarlem 28 June 1822) the daughter of Jan Justus Swaving and Christina Elisabeth Becker. On 16 March 1787 in Haarlem his son Jacobus Enschedé II was born.
