= Johannes Enschedé II =

Dutch regent and collector

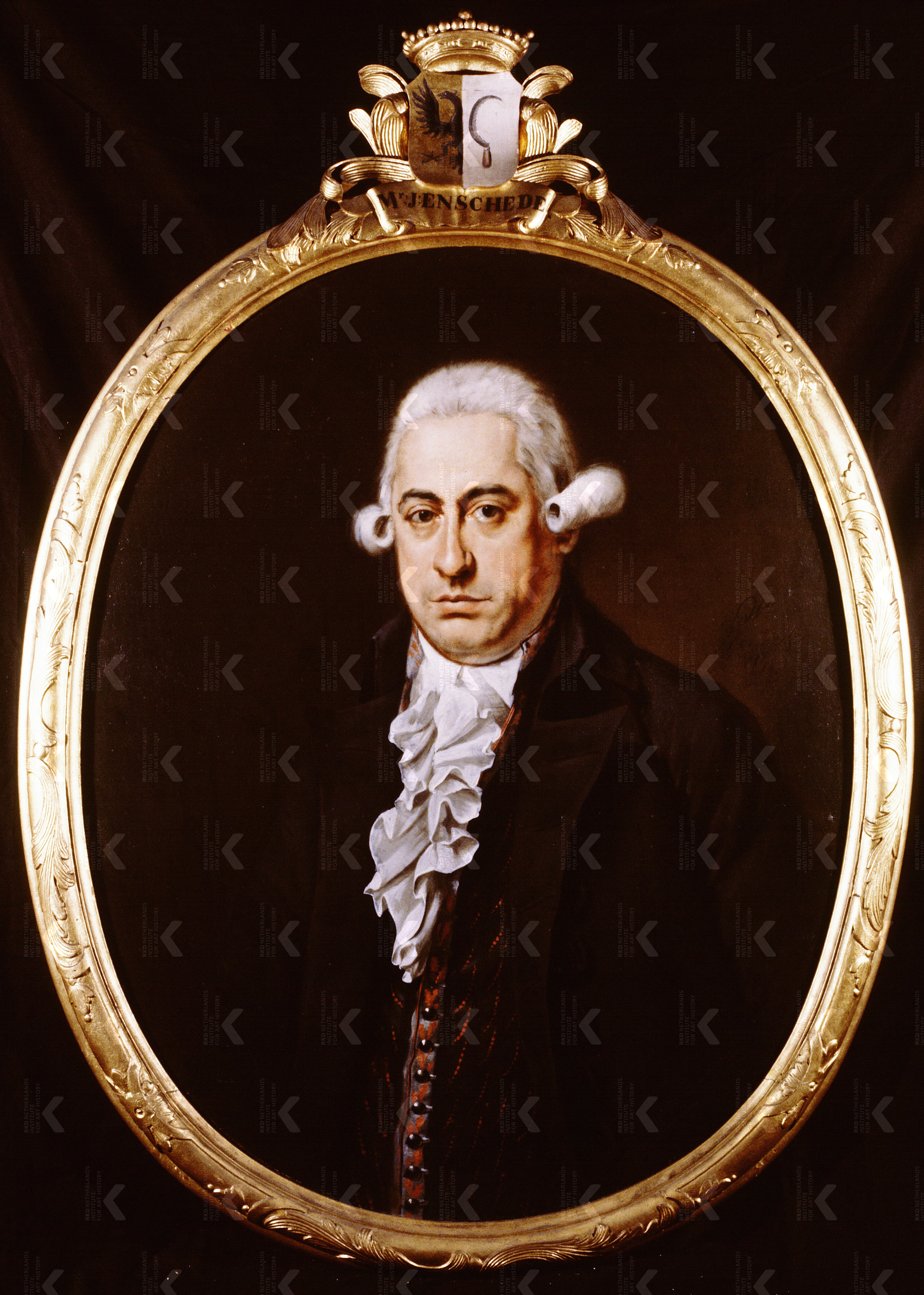
- Portrait by Wybrand Hendricks, 1791
- Born: 16 November 1750; Haarlem, Dutch Republic
- Died: 29 July 1799 (aged 48); Haarlem, Batavian Republic
- Occupations: Publisher; printer
- Spouse: Johanna Swaving (m. 1783)
- Children: 7, including Johannes III
- Parents: Johannes Enschedé (father); Helena Hoefnagel (mother)
- Relatives: Adriaan Enschedé (grandson)

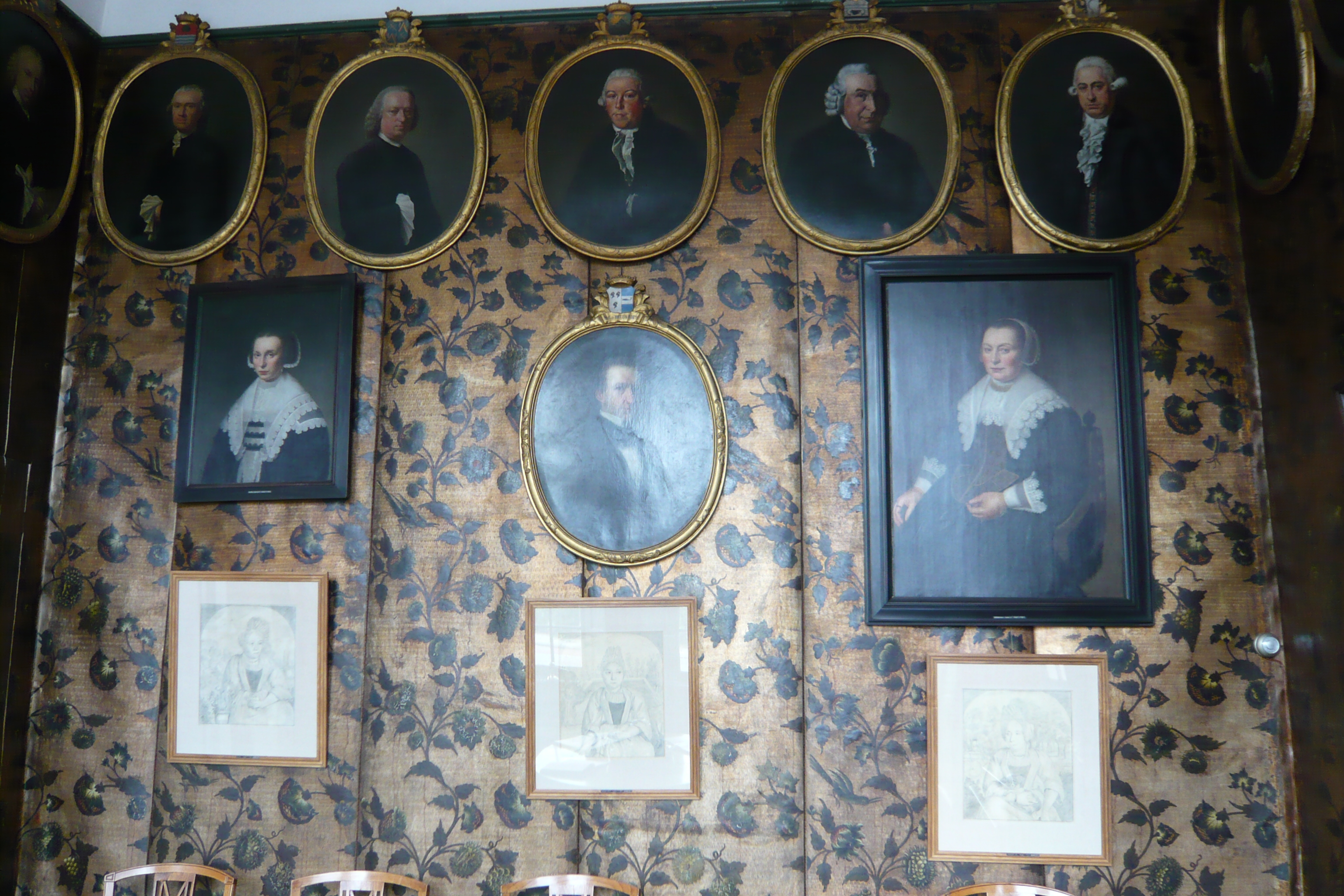
Johannes Enschedé was regent of the Hofjes Staats and Noblet. His portrait (upper right) was painted by Wybrand Hendricks.

Johannes Enschedé Jr. (Haarlem, 16 November 1750 – Haarlem, 29 July 1799) was a Haarlem regent and collector.

== Biography ==
He was the grandson of the founder of the Joh. Enschedé company and one of the first members of the Dutch Society of Science and the Teylers Second Society. He was a regent of the St. Elizabeth's-Gasthuis and the Hofje van Staats en Noblet. Johannes was the son of Johannes Enschedé and the brother of Jacobus and Abraham. He married Johanna Elisabeth Swaving on 25 August 1783 and was the father of Johannes Enschedé III and Christiaan Justus Enschedé (father of Adriaan Justus Enschedé).

His father was a collector of Costeriana and had statues of Coster and Hadrianus Junius, Coster's biographer, placed in the garden of his home, adjacent to the typesetter's workshop in 1768. An engraving by Cornelis van Noorde shows the workshop and the statues. Enschedé Jr. continued his father's collection of Costeriana and also added his love of Greek and Latin books. He died relatively young, and his wife succeeded him in his role leading the company. Under her influence the day-to-day operations were split into three divisions; the newspaper, the type foundry, and the Bible publishing. This "triumvirate" lasted three generations.
