= Jacobus Enschedé II =

Jacobus Enschedé II (16 March 1778 in Haarlem – 3 June 1865 in Haarlem) was a Haarlem newspaper editor and printer.

== Biography ==
He was a son of Abraham Enschedé and Sandrina Christina Swaving. For some time he was a partner in the family company. On 5 October 1806 in Haarlem, he married Johanna Christiana Abbensets (Rio de Berbice 22 February 1792 – Haarlem 20 February 1866), the daughter of Lodewijk Christoffel Abbensets and Maria Elisabeth Heijtmeijer. On 6 April 1807, his son Jan Justus Enschedé was born in Haarlem.
