= Johan Enschedé Hof =

Courtyard in Haarlem, Netherlands

Coordinates: 52°22′53″N 4°38′23″E

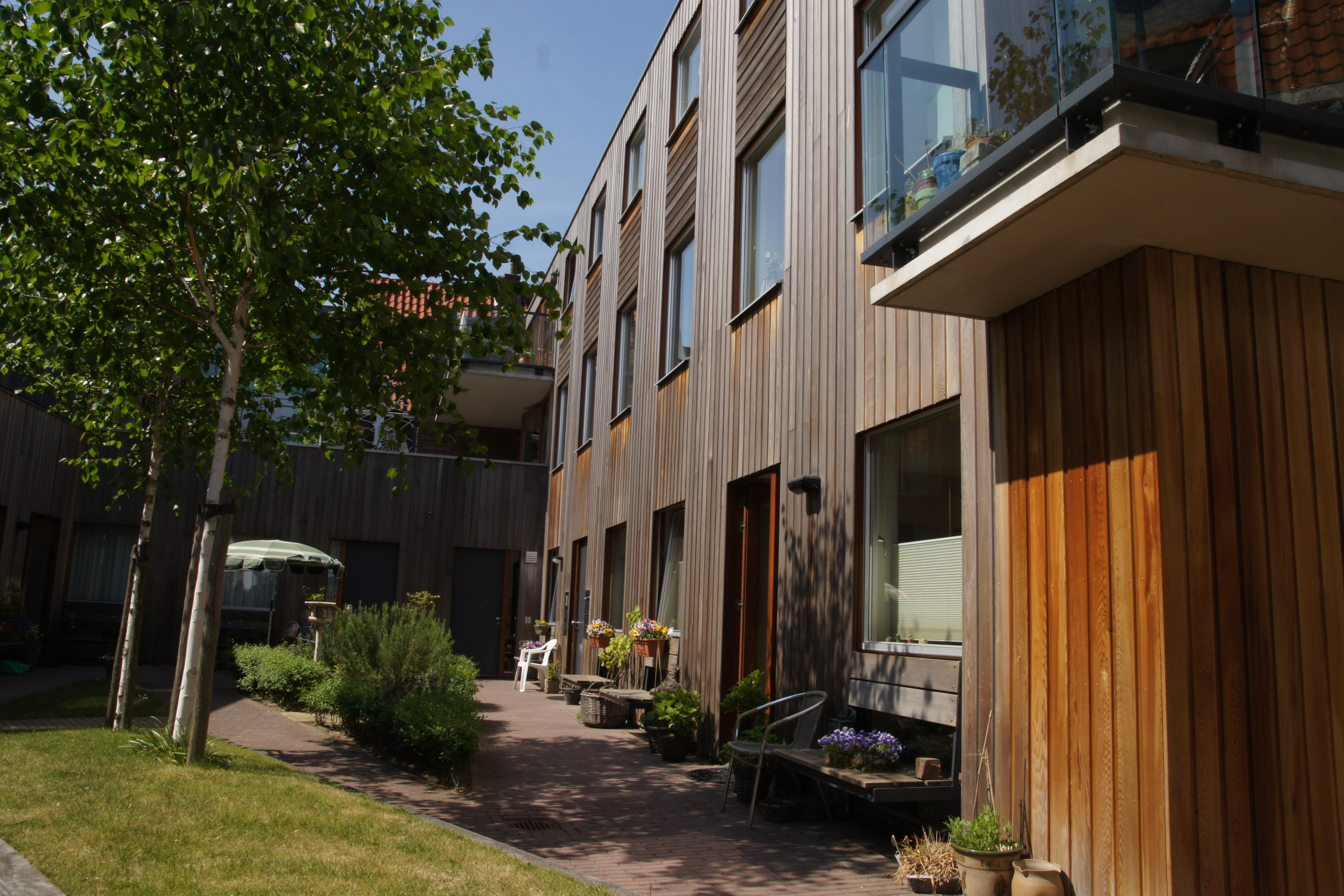
Central courtyard and main building of Johan Enschedé Hof

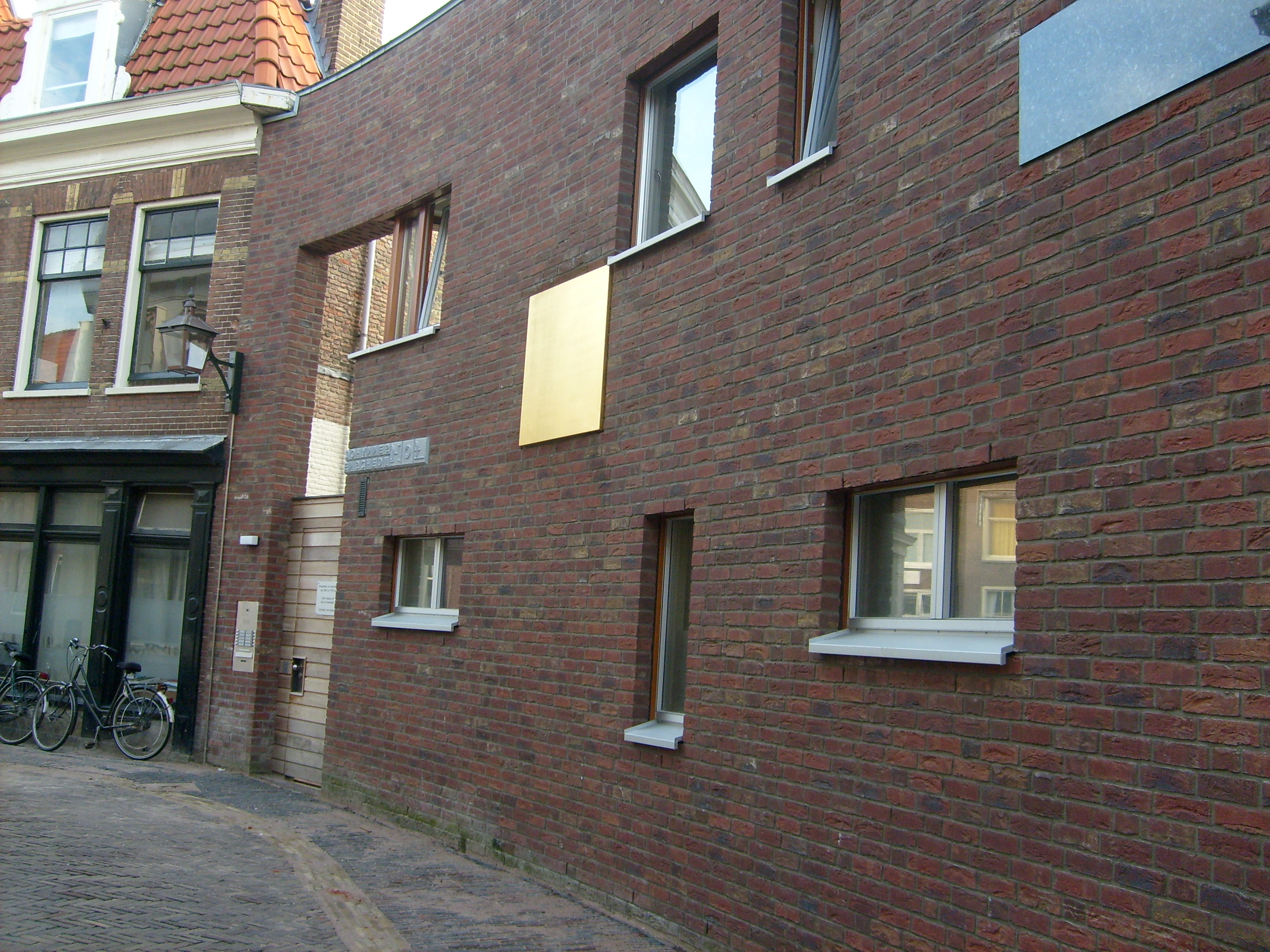
Johan Enschedé Hof in the Korte Begijnestraat

The Johan Enschedé Hof is a hofje in Haarlem, Netherlands, on the Korte Begijnestraat. Via a rear entrance it is linked to the Hofje van Bakenes.

== Building ==
It was designed and built in 2007 by Joost Swarte and Henk Döll who also collaborated on the Haarlem theater, the Toneelschuur, located around the corner. It was named after Johannes Enschedé III, the man under whom the printing company of the same name grew to be located on this spot. This hofje is managed by the same regents that manage the Hofje van Bakenes, which can be reached through the rear entrance. The hofje has 10 apartments, of which 8 are for women over 65 and two are for elderly couples.

The hofje garden is open to visitors from 10:00 until 17:00.

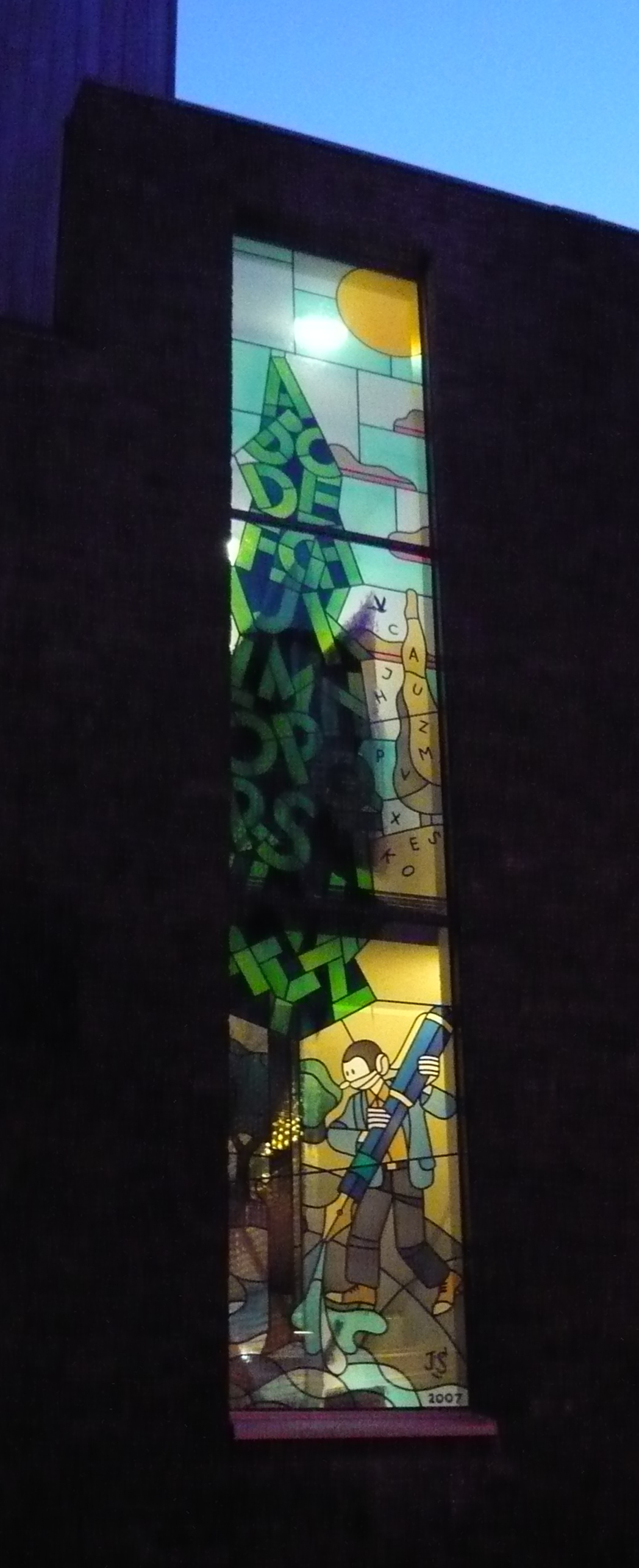
Stained glass window by Joost Swarte

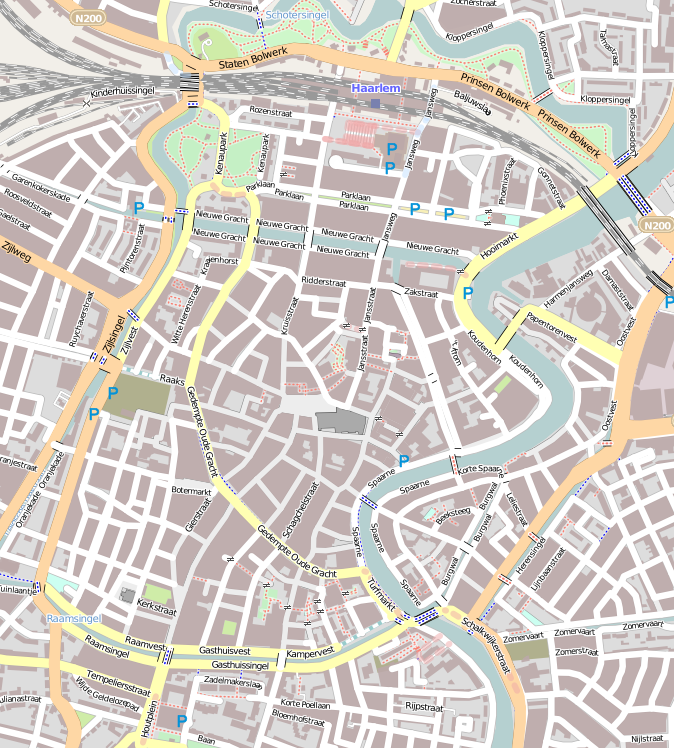
The Johan Enschedé Hof bends with the curve of the street.
