= Izaak Enschedé =

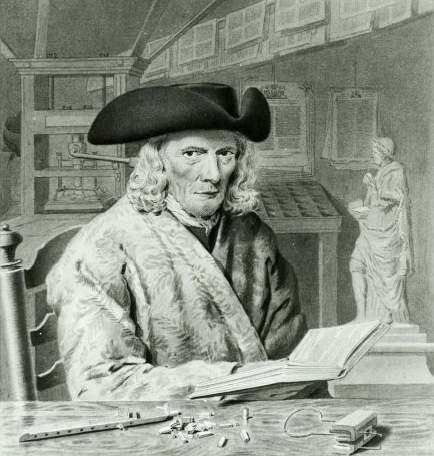
- Portrait by Cornelis van Noorde, 1755
- Born: 16 April 1681; Haarlem, Dutch Republic
- Died: 1 May 1761 (aged 80); Haarlem, Dutch Republic
- Occupations: Publisher; printer
- Spouse: Beeltje van der Lucht (m. 1702; died 1756)
- Children: Johannes Enschedé
- Parents: Johannes Enscheda (father); Elisabeth van den Berg

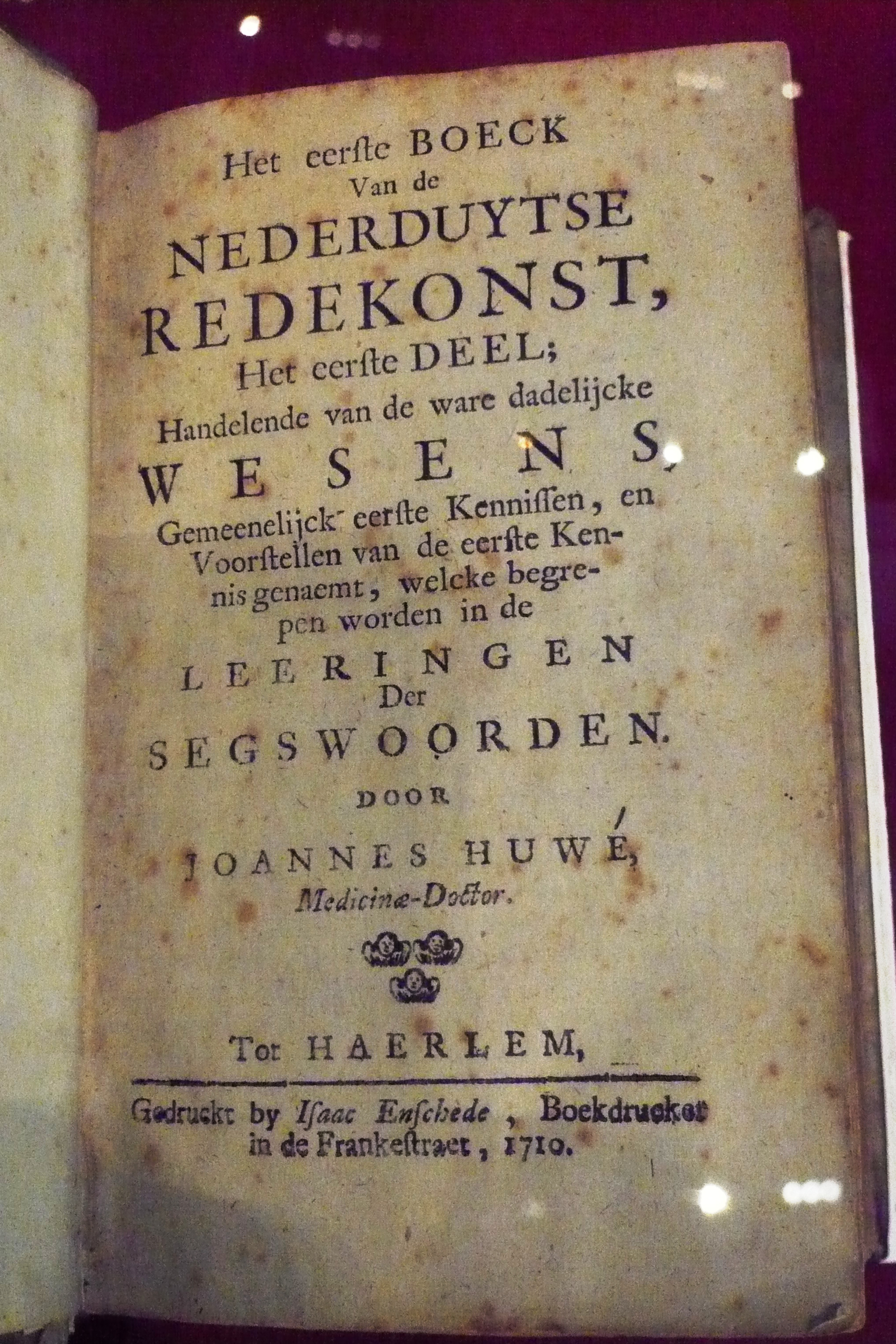
The first book of rhetoric in Dutch, by dr. Johannes Huwé, printed by Isaac Enschedé in 1710

Izaak Enschedé (Haarlem, 16 April 1681 – Haarlem, 1 May 1761) was the founder of the printing company Royal Joh. Enschedé in 1703.

He was the son of Johannes Enscheda (baptised Groningen, 18 July 1642 – Haarlem, 4 October 1706) and Elisabeth Jansdochter van den Berg (27 April 1632, Haarlem – 18 July 1723, Haarlem).

On 29 October 1702 in Haarlem, he married Beeltje van der Lucht (Haarlem, 22 January 1677 – Haarlem, 8 March 1756), daughter of Barend Stevenzoon van der Lucht and Jozijntje Marchant.

Until then Enschedé worked for the Opregte Haarlemsche Courant that was owned by the heirs of Vincent Casteleyn. Together with his son Johannes, they bought the newspaper in 1737, the same year they were named city publisher by the council of Haarlem. The family business went well and they took over the typesetting business of the Amsterdam publisher Hendrik Floris Wetstein in 1743, which had fonts designed by the punchcutter Joan Michaël Fleischman.
