= Johannes Enschedé IV =

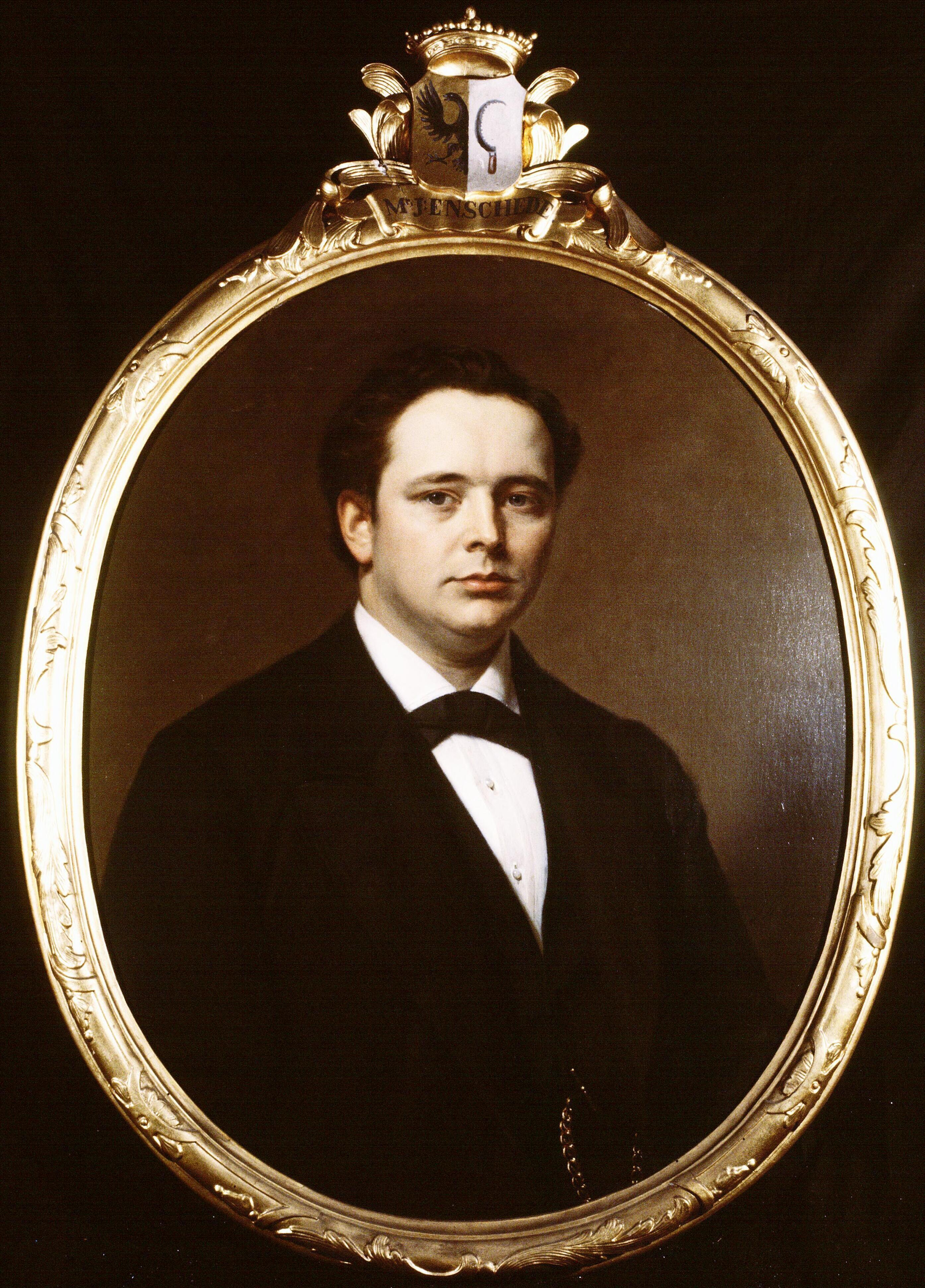
- Portrait by Johan Neuman, c. 1865
- Born: 20 November 1811; Haarlem, First French Empire
- Died: 16 August 1878 (aged 66); Haarlem, Netherlands
- Occupations: Publisher; printer
- Spouses: Mathilda Amelie Lambert (m. 1849; died 1855) Henriette Mirandolle (m. 1858)
- Children: Johannes Enschedé V
- Parents: Johannes Enschedé III (father); Catharina van Walré (mother)
- Relatives: Adriaan Enschedé (first cousin)

Johannes Enschedé IV (Haarlem, 20 November 1811 – Haarlem, 16 August 1878) was a Haarlem newspaper editor and printer.

== Biography ==
He was the great-great-grandson of the founder of the Joh. Enschedé company, and the son of Johannes Enschedé III. He studied law in Leiden and returned to become partner in the family company. On 29 November 1849 in Paris, he married Mathilda Amelie Lambert, (Mortefontaine, 11 June 1827 – Haarlem, 2 October 1855), daughter of John Lambert and Charlotte Robertine Mirandolle. From this marriage was born on 26 August 1851 a son, Johannes Enschedé V. He remarried in Amsterdam on 11 November 1858 with Henriette Jacqueline Mirandolle (The Hague, 31 August 1826 – Haarlem, 12 September 1900), daughter of Mr. Charles François Mirandolle and Georgine Antoinette van der Tuuk.
