= Museum Enschedé =

Defunct museum in Haarlem, Netherlands

Coordinates: 52°22′51.46″N 4°38′18.40″E

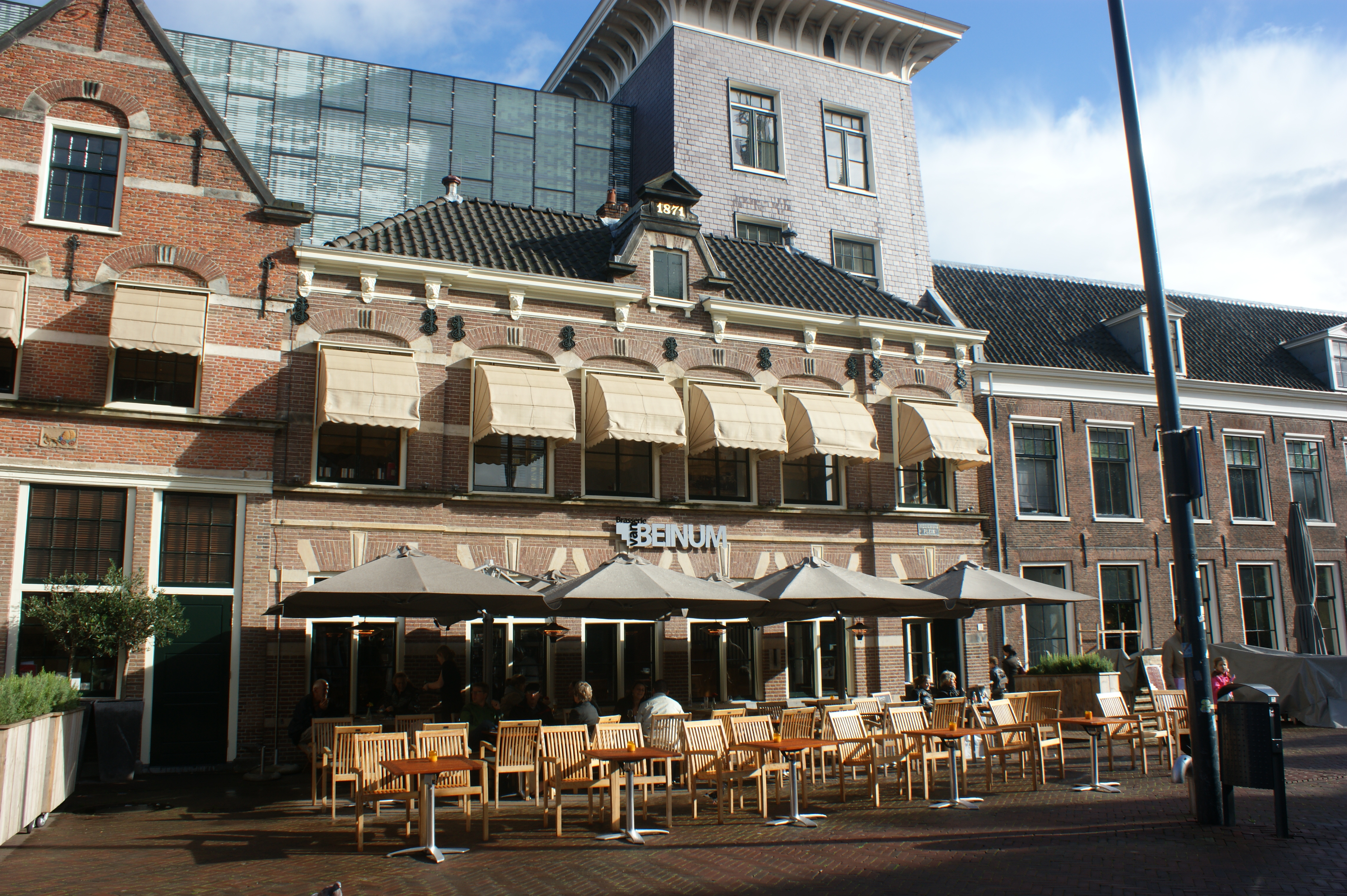
Former location of the museum has been renovated to house restaurants and now lies above a parking garage. Under the reconstructed "clock tower", an old gateway contains a memorial plaque to Enschedé

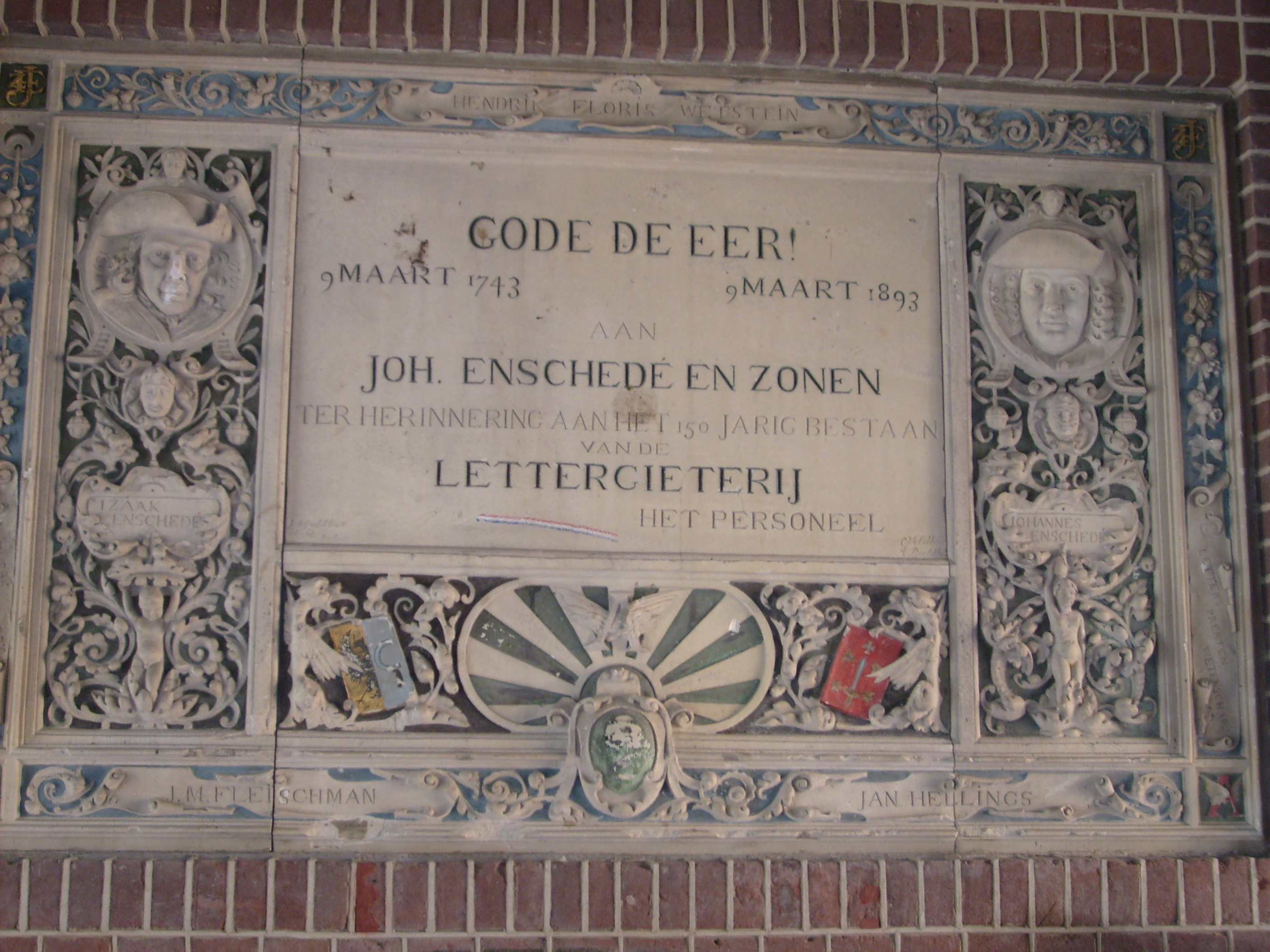
Memorial plaque on original site of Johan Enschede foundry on the Klokhuisplein behind the Sint-Bavokerk

Museum Enschedé is a defunct museum that was located in the center of Haarlem, Netherlands, on the Klokhuisplein 5, across from the St. Bavochurch.

== History ==
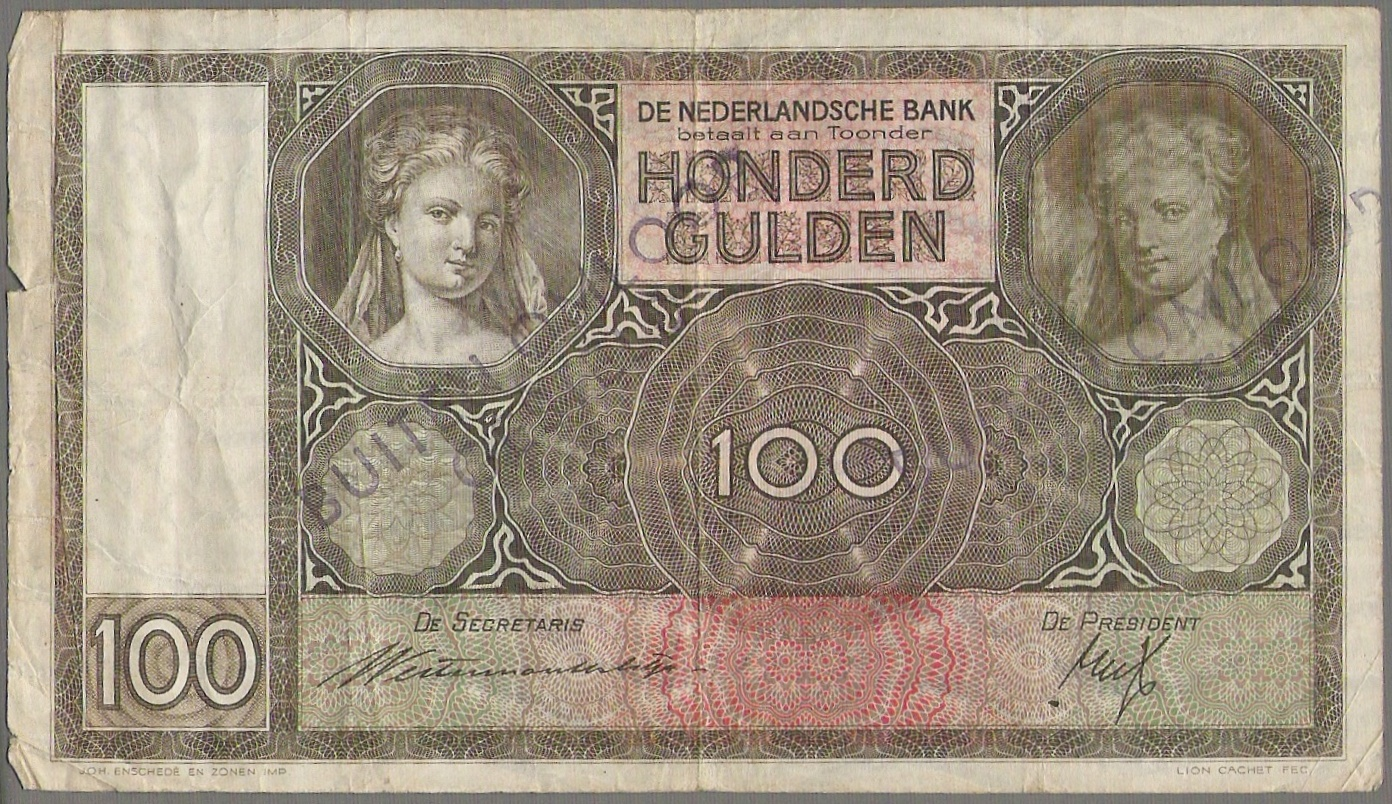
Old banknote from 1935 has the text Joh. Enschedé en Zonen in the lower left corner

In 1904 the museum was founded in a building that was part of the first printing complex in use by Joh. Enschedé, a historical site in Haarlem that was dug up in the 1990s and is today home to an underground parking garage. The building was previously a workshop for the Grafische Inrichting, or Typography. The Joh. Enschedé company was at one time the largest printer in the Netherlands which from 1737 to 1940 printed the Oprechte Haerlemsche Courant and from 1810 onwards became a mint that printed banknotes and later postage stamps. The museum used to have on display an overview of the art of printing in Haarlem and the Typeography of Enschedé in particular. The collection of newspapers has been put online via the Koninklijke Bibliotheek and the collection of atlases by Joan Blaeu has also been digitized. Work is being done to digitize other parts of the collection. There are artifacts regarding Costeriana (things that support the legend of Laurens Janszoon Coster) and the art of printing banknotes through the centuries in Haarlem.

The museum was closed in 1990 when the Joh. Enschedé offices moved to the Oudeweg. In 2015, most of the collections were moved to the Noord-Hollands Archief.
