= Adriaan Justus Enschedé =

Dutch archivist, collector and printer

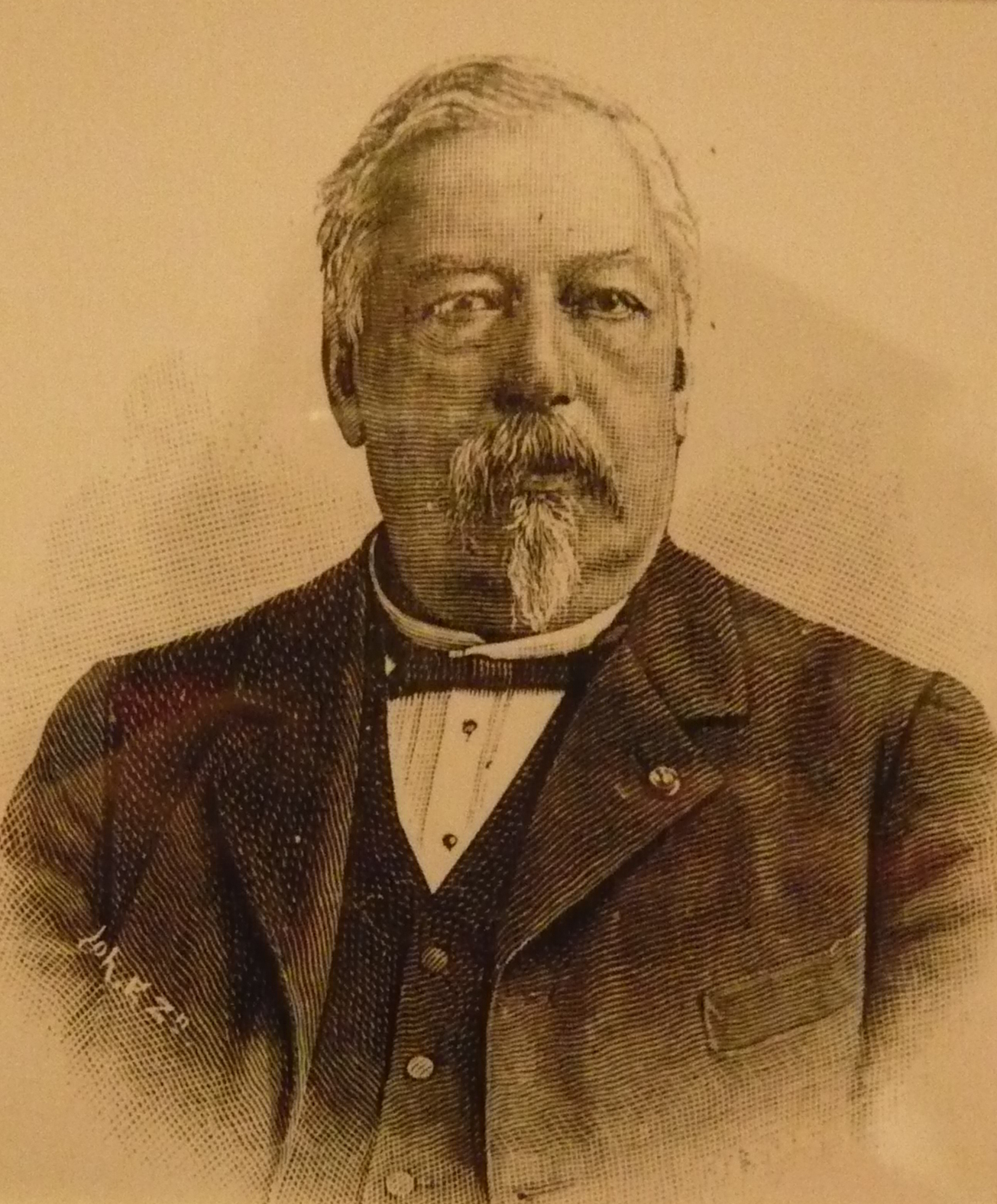
- Portrait in the Teylers Coin and Medal Room
- Born: 20 June 1829; Haarlem, Netherlands
- Died: 19 March 1896 (aged 66); Haarlem, Netherlands
- Occupations: Publisher; printer
- Parents: Christiaan Enschedé (father); Adriana Maria Dalen (mother)
- Relatives: Johannes Enschedé IV (cousin)

Adriaan Justus Enschedé (Haarlem, 20 June 1829 – Haarlem, 19 March 1896) was a Haarlem archivist, collector, owner of the Joh. Enschedé printing company, philanthropist and a member of Teylers Tweede Genootschap (Teylers Second or Scientific Society).

== Biography ==
Adriaan Justus was the son of Christiaan Justus Enschedé and his wife Adriana Maria Dalen. He attended the Stedelijk Gymnasium Haarlem and studied law in Leiden, whereupon he joined the family business in Haarlem and brought historical typefaces back into fashion. He became city archivist in 1857 where he wrote an inventory of the archives, still useful today. He wrote several publications on the history of Haarlem, finding inspiration in his work as city archivist publishing the first inventory of the archives of Haarlem. He was a driving force behind the restoration of the St. Bavochurch for which he donated many historical objects including historical stained-glass windows from other locations, and also for the restoration of the ruin of Castle Brederode.

After his death, Adriaan Justus left a significant collection of paintings, drawings, prints, coins, and books behind. He left his Roman coins to the Teylers Museum.

== Gallery ==
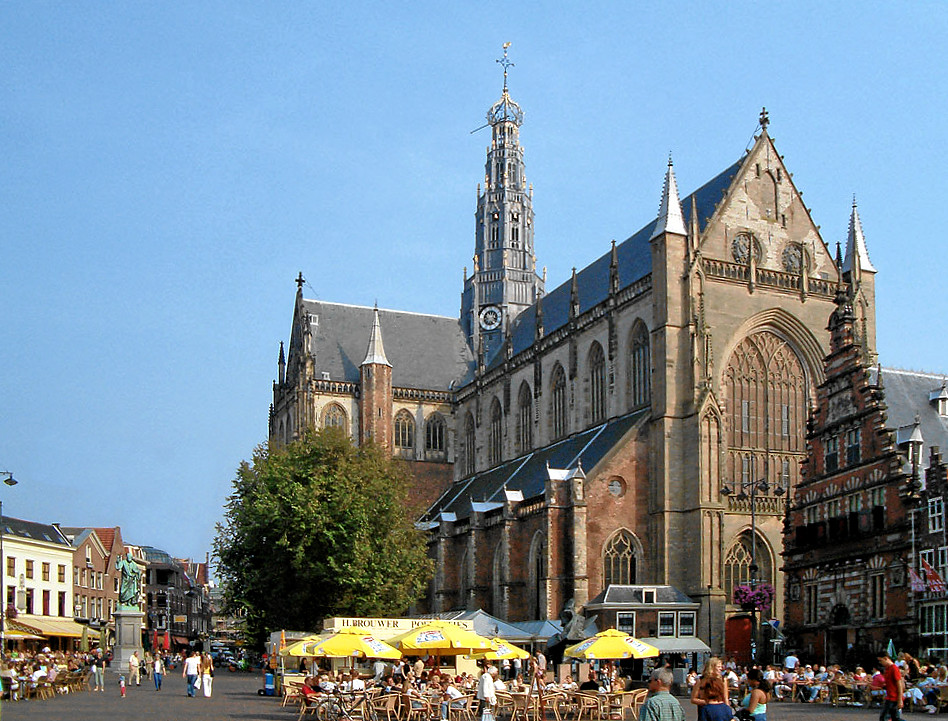
The church with ramparts added with A.J. Enschede's funding

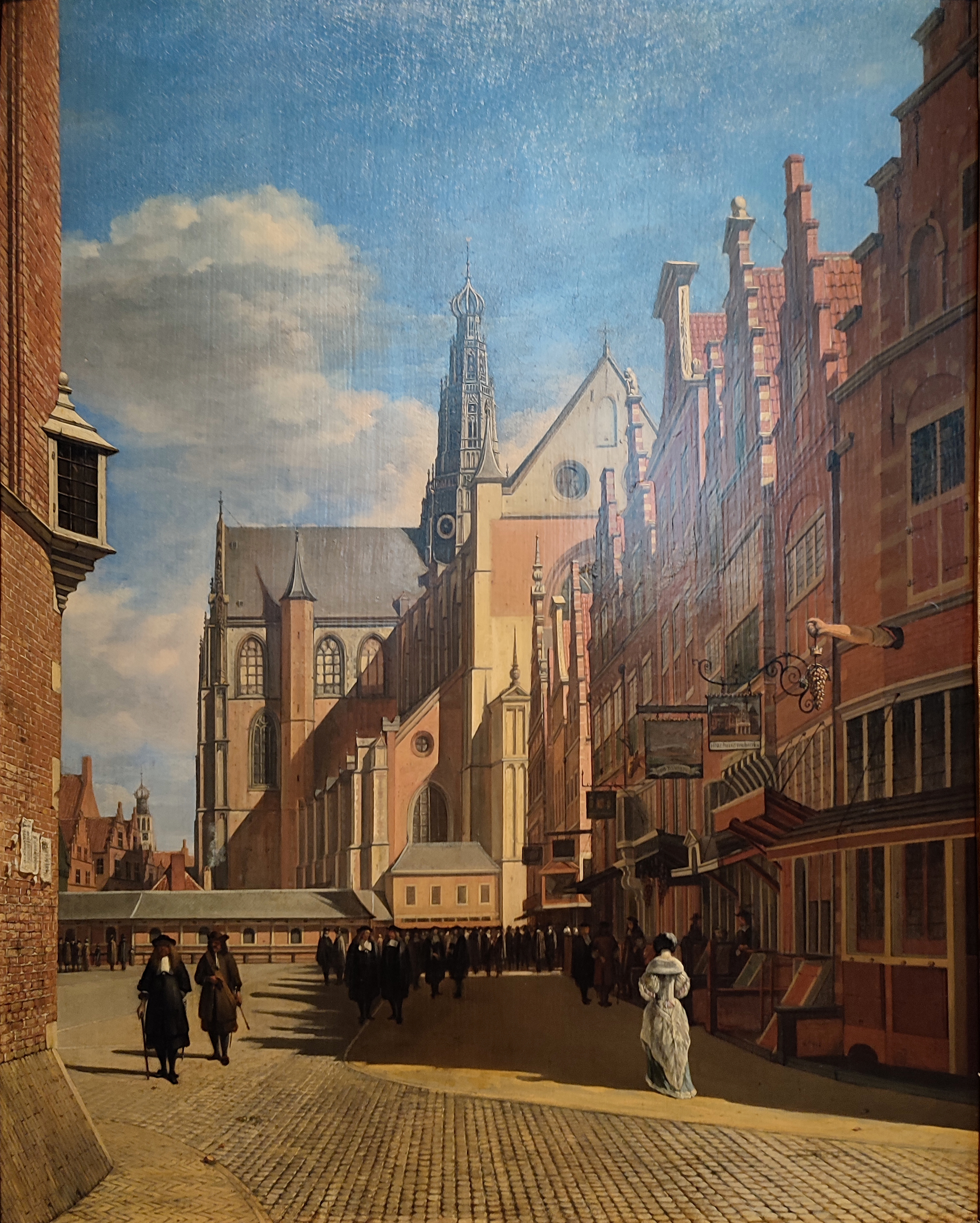
Church in older painting, without the ramparts

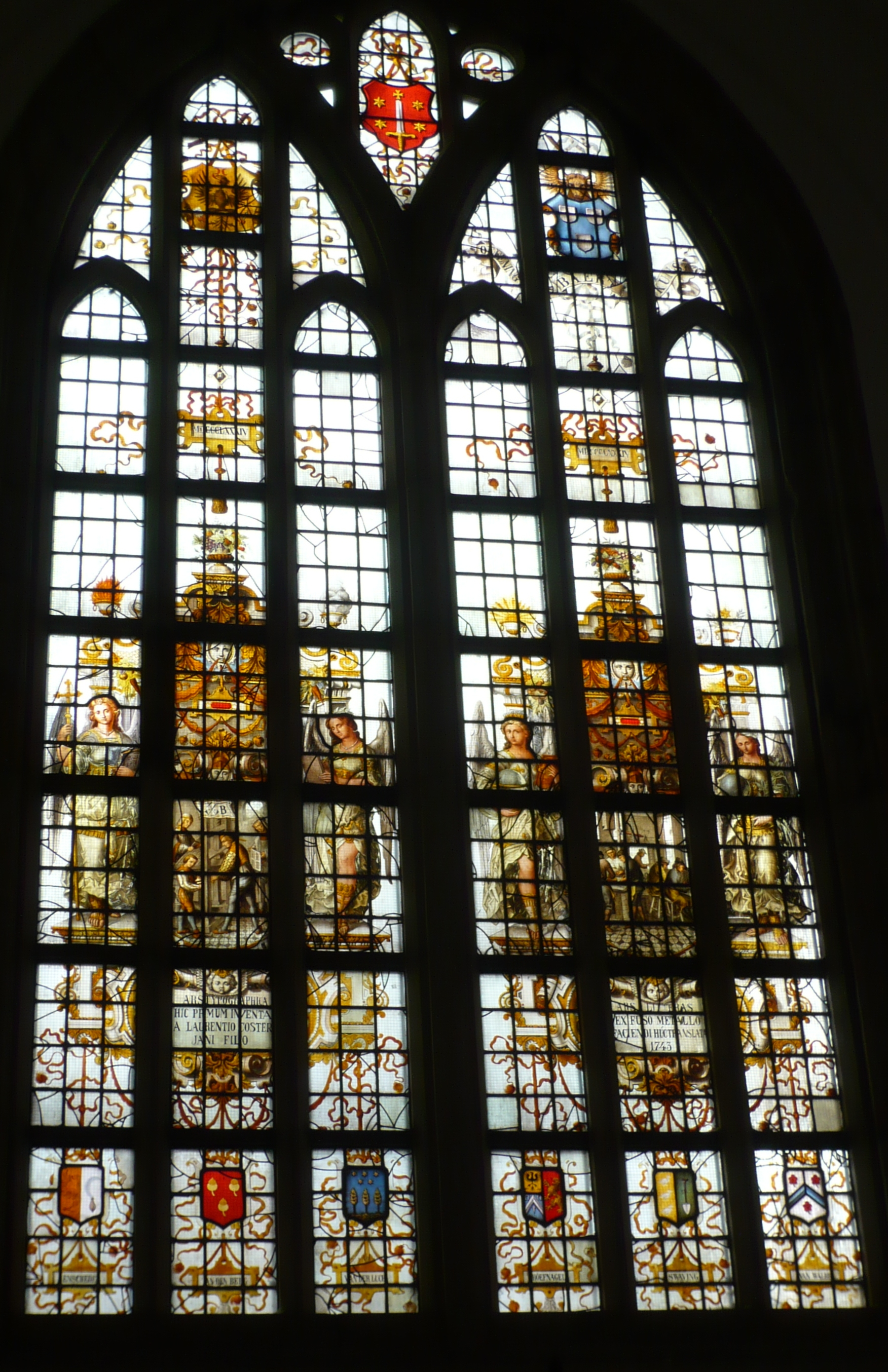
Stained glass window in the church donated by A.J. Enschedé with Laurens Janszoon Coster on the left and a typesetter's workshop on the right.

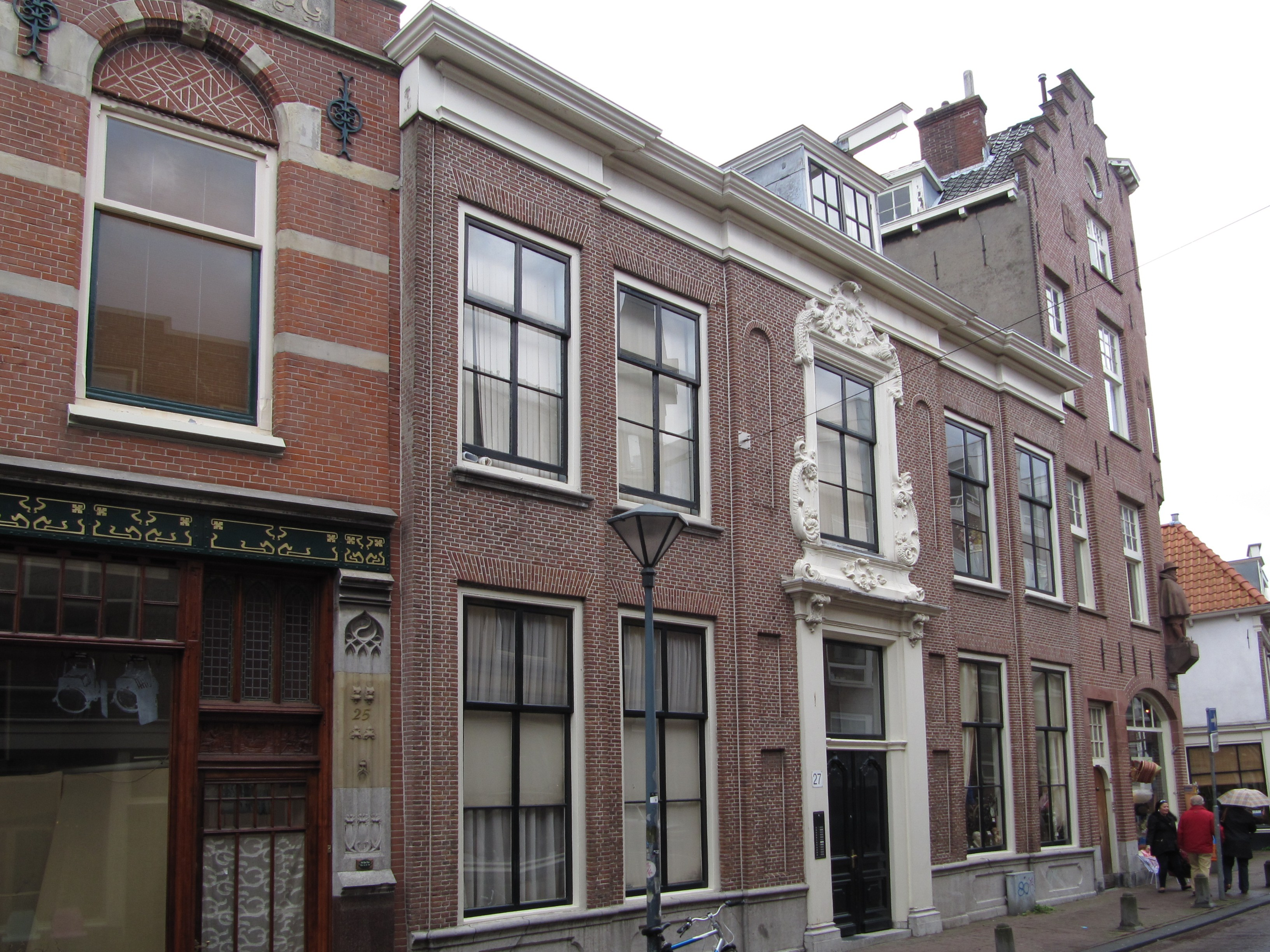
His former home on Zijlstraat 27

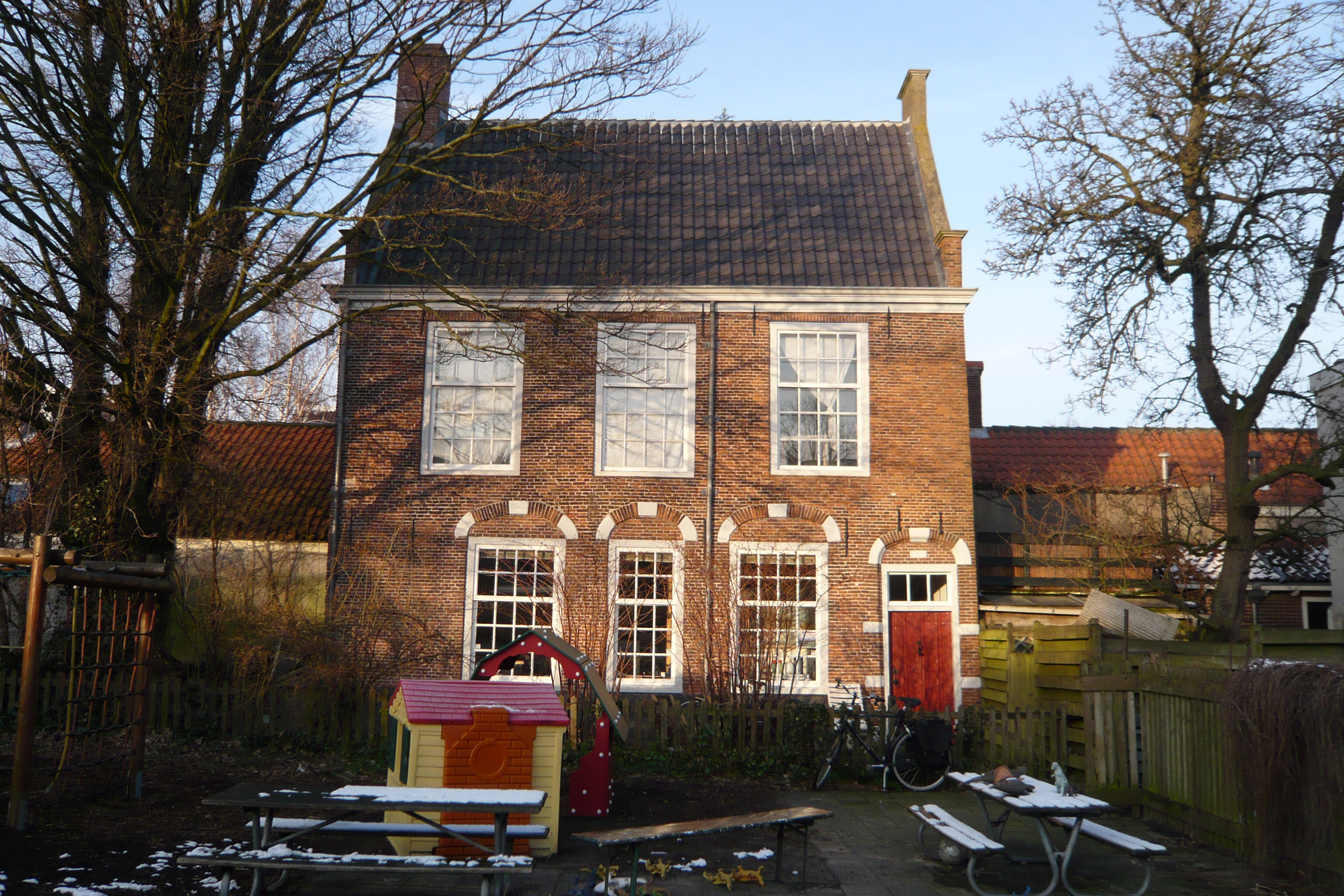
Former guild house of the Coomanshof which Enschedé bought and annexed to his rear garden
