= Johannes Enschedé III =

Haarlem paper editor and painter (1785 - 1886)

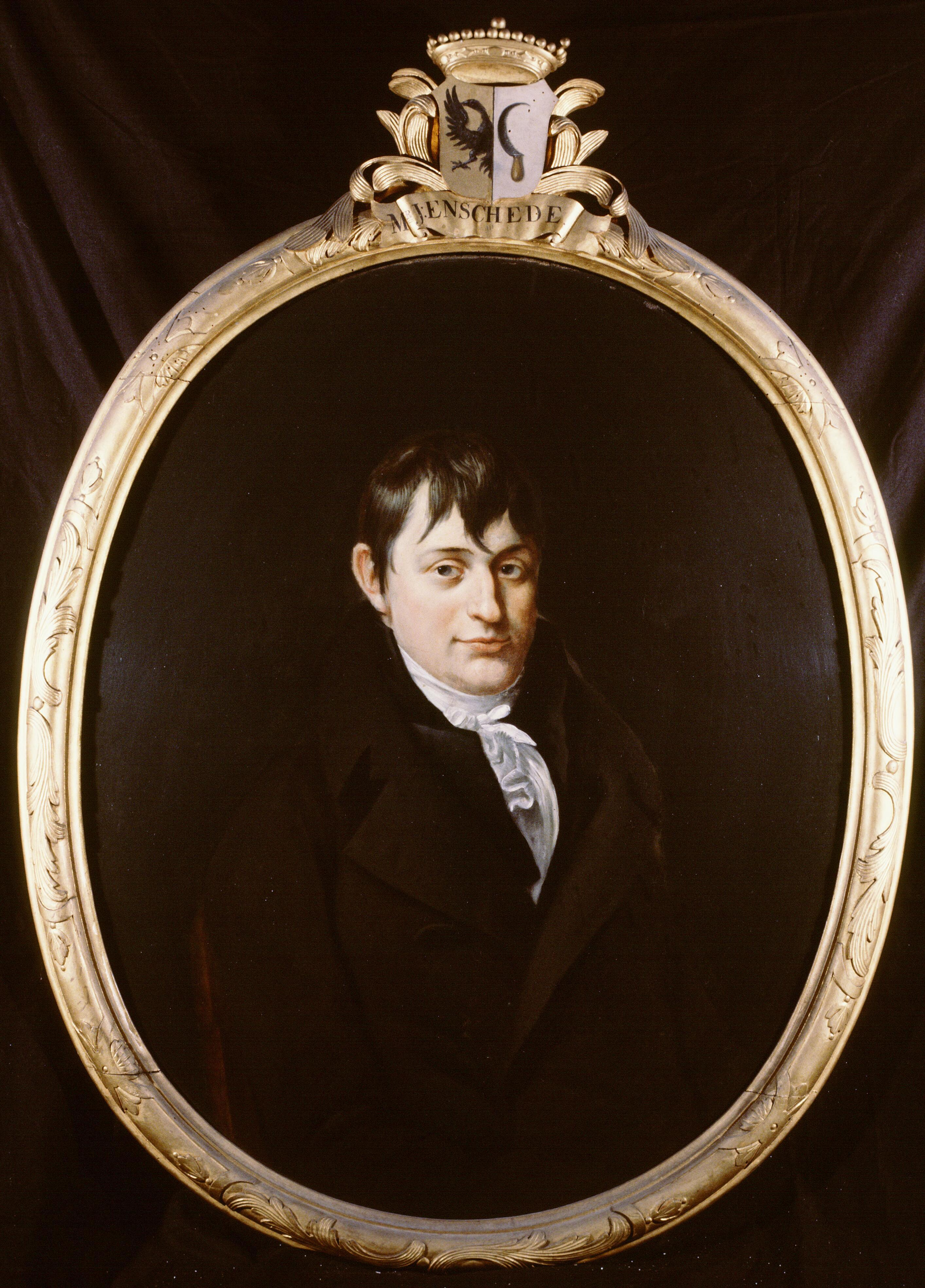
- Portrait by Wybrand Hendricks, c. 1825
- Born: 7 March 1785; Haarlem, Dutch Republic
- Died: 8 October 1866 (aged 81); Haarlem, Netherlands
- Occupations: Publisher; printer
- Spouse: Catharina van Walré (m. 1810; died 1845)
- Children: Johannes Enschedé IV
- Parents: Johannes Enschedé II (father); Johanna Swaving (mother)
- Relatives: Adriaan Enschedé (nephew)

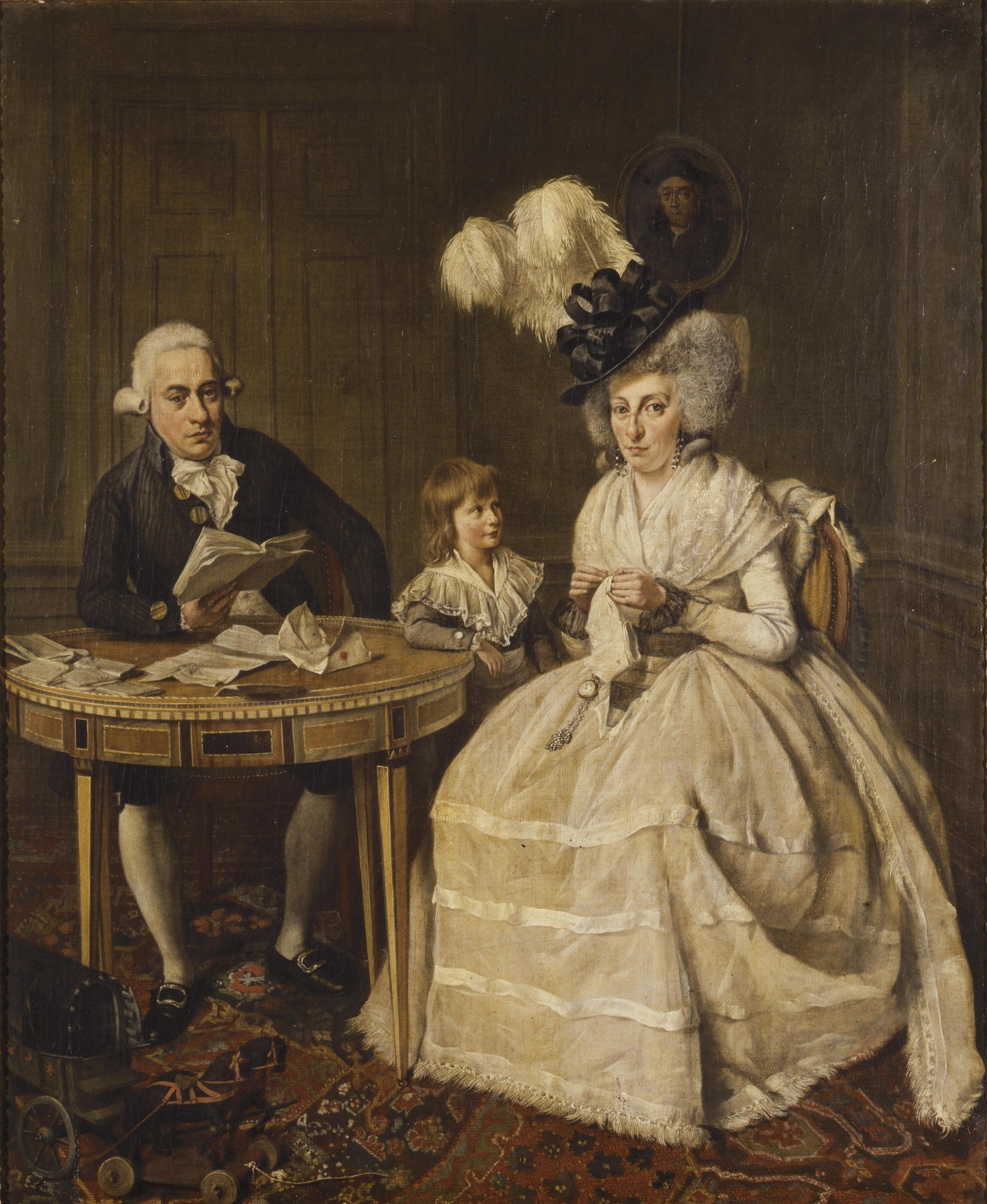
Johannes Enschedé III with his parents Johanna Swaving and Johannes Enschedé II

Johannes Enschedé III (Haarlem, 7 March 1785 – Haarlem, 8 October 1866) was a Haarlem newspaper editor and printer.

== Biography ==
He was the great-grandson of the founder of the Joh. Enschedé company and the oldest son of Johannes Enschedé II. Like his father and grandfather before him, he was a member of the Dutch Society of Science and the Teylers Second Society. He studied law in Leiden and returned to become partner in the family company at the young age of 20, where he became editor of the Opregte Haarlemsche Courant. On 25 March 1810, he married Catharina Hillegonda van Walré, (Haarlem, 16 August 1791 – Haarlem, 18 December 1845) the daughter of Jan van Walré and Maria Kops. From this marriage was born on 20 November 1811 a son, Johannes Enschedé IV.

Like his father, he was a regent of the St. Elizabeth's-Gasthuis and the Hofje van Staats en Noblet. Johannes Enschedé III was judge of instruction, auditor soldier, a member of the Municipal Council, and member of the House of Representatives.

Enschedé III continued his father's collection of art and books, but after his death these were auctioned by his heirs, much to the disappointment of his nephew Adriaan Justus Enschedé, who bought as much of the collection as he could.
