= Jan van Walré =

Dutch bookseller, poet and playwright (1759–1837)

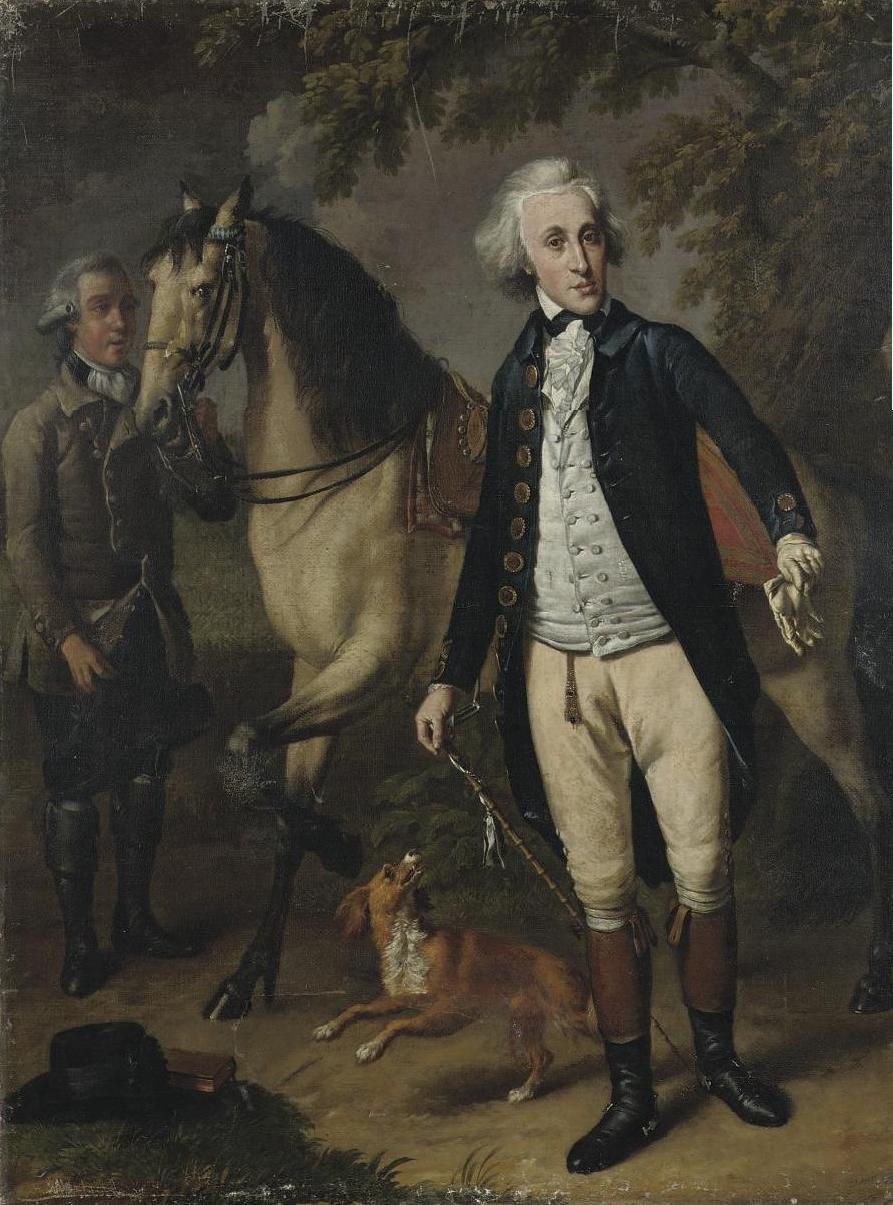
Portrait of Jan van Walré with his horse, dog, and stable boy, by Wybrand Hendricks, 1787

Jan van Walré (1759 – 1837) was a Dutch bookseller, poet and playwright.

== Biography ==
Born 1759, in Haarlem, van Walré was a Remonstrant married to a Mennonite and a bookseller who became a member of Teylers Eerste Genootschap from 1781 to 1782. He received a large inheritance in 1782, leading him to cease his business activities and pursue his hobbies. In the same year, he joined a literature society started by Adriaan Loosjes, Vlijt moeder der Wetenschappen, and became an actor. In 1785, the society was reinvented as the theater society Leerzaam vermaak with a strong Patriotic bias with Loosjes and Walré the leaders. In 1787, Walré joined the Haarlem vrijkorps (armed citizen's guard) named Pro aris et focis as a captain and served in 1787 in Nieuwersluis. When this action failed and Haarlem returned to the orangists, Leerzaam vermaak was forbidden, but the group became active again in 1788. Loosjes began to avoid politics and in 1789 he started the Haarlem scientific society Maatschappij tot Nut van 't Algemeen. To continue his comedy pursuits, he began the society Democriet in the same year with the remark Because Heraclitus had to cry, Democritus had to laugh. In 1790, Walré joined, who again added political color, despite Loosjes' intentions to remain neutral. In 1795, when the French occupation began, the activities of Democriet reached their peak, and after that moment the society began to show similarities with freemasonry.

According to the Netherlands Institute for Art History (RKD), Walré was the grandmaster of the Haarlem satirical literary society Democriet and an amateur draughtsman. He died in 1837, aged 77 or 78, in Haarlem.
