= Laurens Janszoon Coster =

Dutch purported inventor of printing press

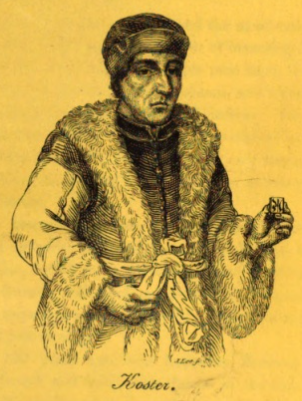
Laurens Janszoon Coster

Laurens Janszoon Coster (Dutch pronunciation: [ˈlʌurəɲ ˈɕɑnsoːŋ ˈkɔstər]; c. 1370 in Haarlem – c. 1440), or Laurens Jansz Koster, is the purported inventor of a printing press from Haarlem. He allegedly invented printing simultaneously with Johannes Gutenberg and was regarded by some in the Netherlands well into the 20th century as having invented printing first.

== Biography ==
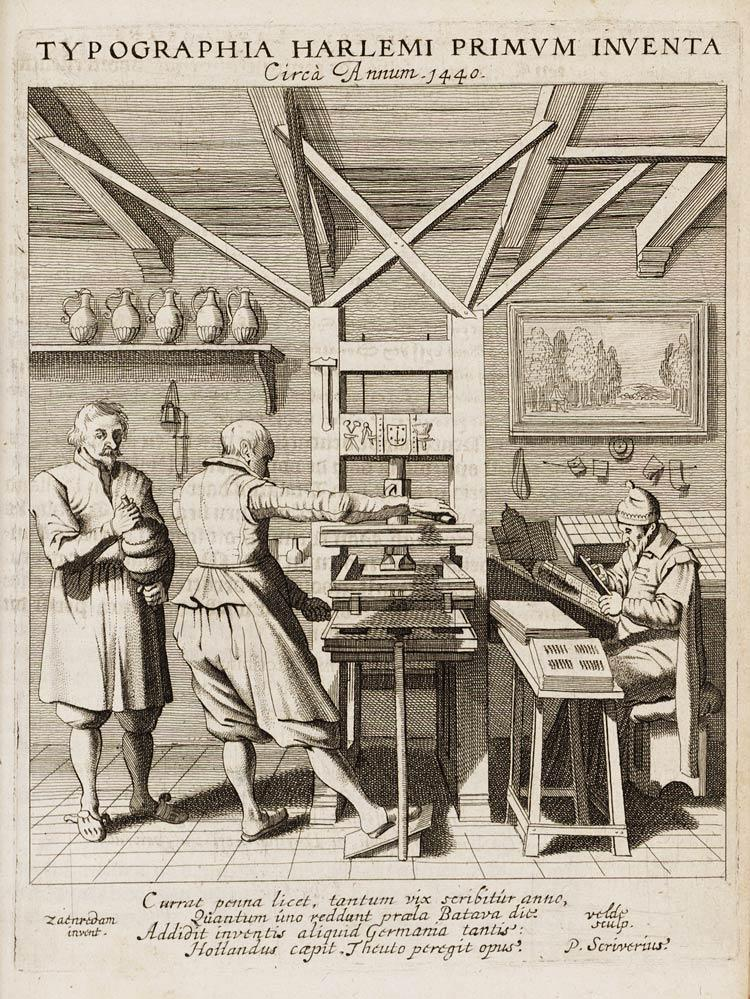
Illustration from a pamphlet by Petrus Scriverius, 1628

He was an important citizen of Haarlem and held the position of sexton (Koster) of Sint-Bavokerk. He is mentioned in contemporary documents between 1417 and 1434 as a member of the great council, an assessor (scabinus), and as the city treasurer. He probably perished in the plague that visited Haarlem in 1439 and 1440; his widow is mentioned in the latter year.

There are no known works printed by Laurens.

== Junius story ==
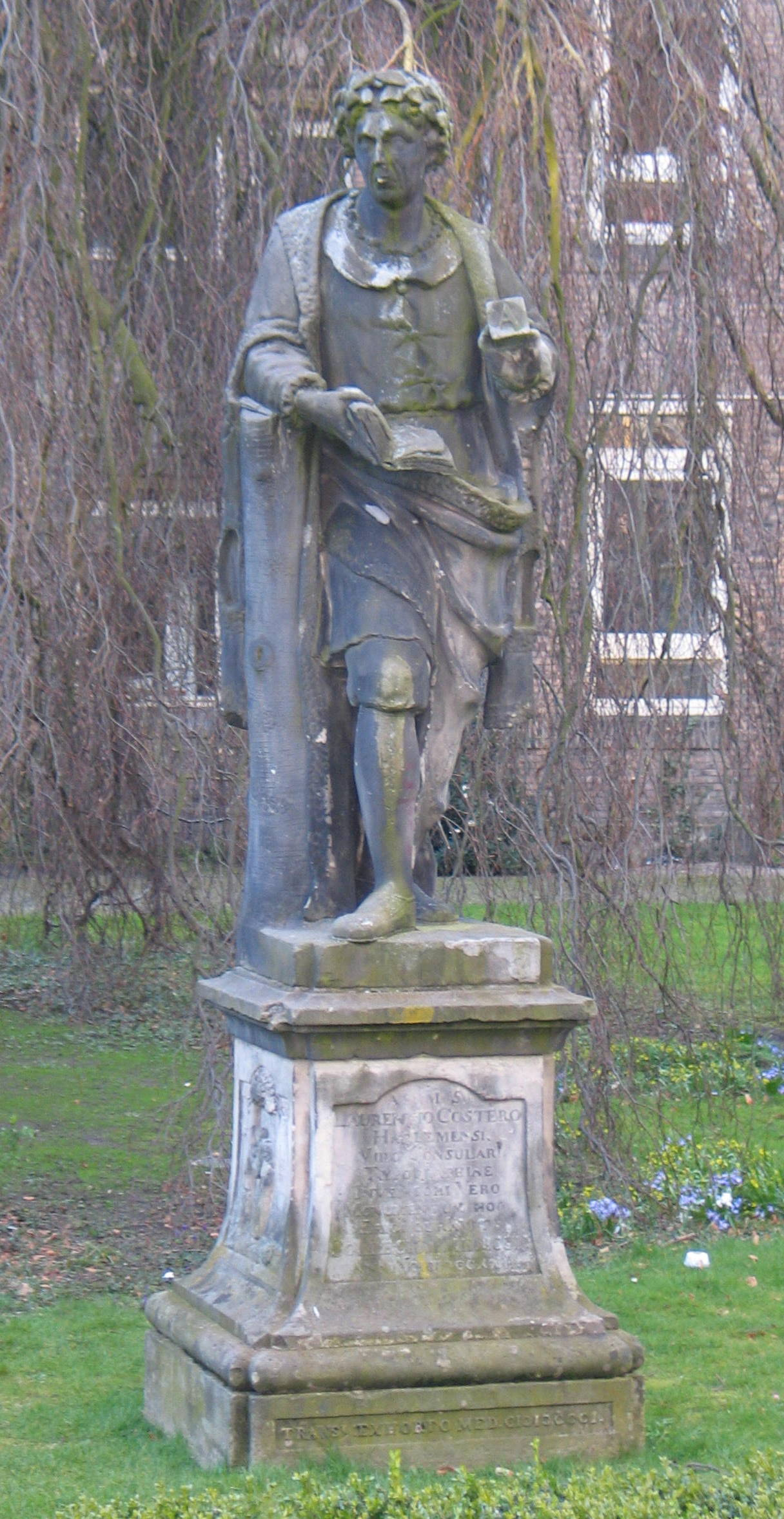
Statue of Laurens Janszoon Coster designed by Romeyn de Hooghe.

Hadrianus Junius, otherwise known as Adriaen de Jonghe, wrote this story around 1567 in his book Batavia, published only in 1588, and was quoted by Cornelis de Bie. Now known primarily for his Emblemata, Junius moved to Haarlem in 1550, and wrote several books, acting shortly as the rector of the Latin School there, as the city physician and as historiographer of the States of Holland (as of 1565/66). His story was echoed by his friend Dirck Volckertszoon Coornhert, who started a printing business in Haarlem in 1560. Later Samuel Ampzing (with the help of Petrus Scriverius) repeated the story in Lavre-Kranz Voor Lavrens Koster Van Haerlem, Eerste Vinder vande Boek-Druckerye (1628) with illustrations of the invention. According to Junius, sometime in the 1420s, Coster was in the Haarlemmerhout carving letters from bark for the amusement of his grandchildren, and observed that the letters left impressions on the sand. He proceeded to invent a new type of ink that did not run, and he began a printing company based on his invention with a primitive typesetting arrangement using moveable type. Since the Haarlemmerhout was burned during a siege by the Kennemers in 1426 during the Hook and Cod wars, this must have been early in the 1420s. Using wooden letters at first, he later used lead and tin movable type. His company prospered and grew. He is said to have printed several books including Speculum Humanae Salvationis with several assistants including the letter cutter Johann Fust, and it was this letter cutter Fust (often spelled Faust) who, when Laurens was nearing death, broke his promise of secrecy and stole his presses and type and took them to Mainz where he started his own printing company.

== Story by Ulrich Zell ==
There is support for the claim that Coster might be the inventor. In the anonymous Kölner Chronik of 1499, Ulrich Zell, a printing assistant from Cologne, who was then between the age of 60 and 69 years old, claimed that printing had started in Mainz. He based this statement on knowledge that Holland used to print Latin grammar texts (Donatus). Neither Coster nor Haarlem are mentioned in that chronicle. If true, this points to Johann Gutenberg about a decade after Coster's death. However, the first securely dated book by Dutch printers is from 1471, long after Gutenberg. Either way, Coster is somewhat of a Haarlem local "hero", and apart from a statue on the Grote Markt his name can be found in many places in the city.

== Earliest known Haarlem printer ==
Between 1483 and 1486, Jacob Bellaert worked in Haarlem. His books were known for their artistic woodcuts. Haarlem, Gouda, and Delft were all cities with early printing presses. This was because these cities did not have powerful religious institutions or universities, where competing copyist production (scriptoria) took place. Bellart did not enjoy much success, however, because there were few buyers for his books in the Nederduits language. Most people who could afford a book wanted it to be in French, since that was the common language of the ruling classes. Perhaps the strongest evidence in favor of Gutenberg is therefore that Mainz has in its possession today a first-edition of Erasmus' Lof der Zotheid (English translation: The Praise of Folly), which was written in Gouda, but printed in Mainz in 1511. The earliest printed book from the Netherlands that has been dated with any certainty is from 1473. It is in the possession of the Museum Meermanno-Westreenianum and was printed in Utrecht, not Haarlem.

== 300th anniversary ==
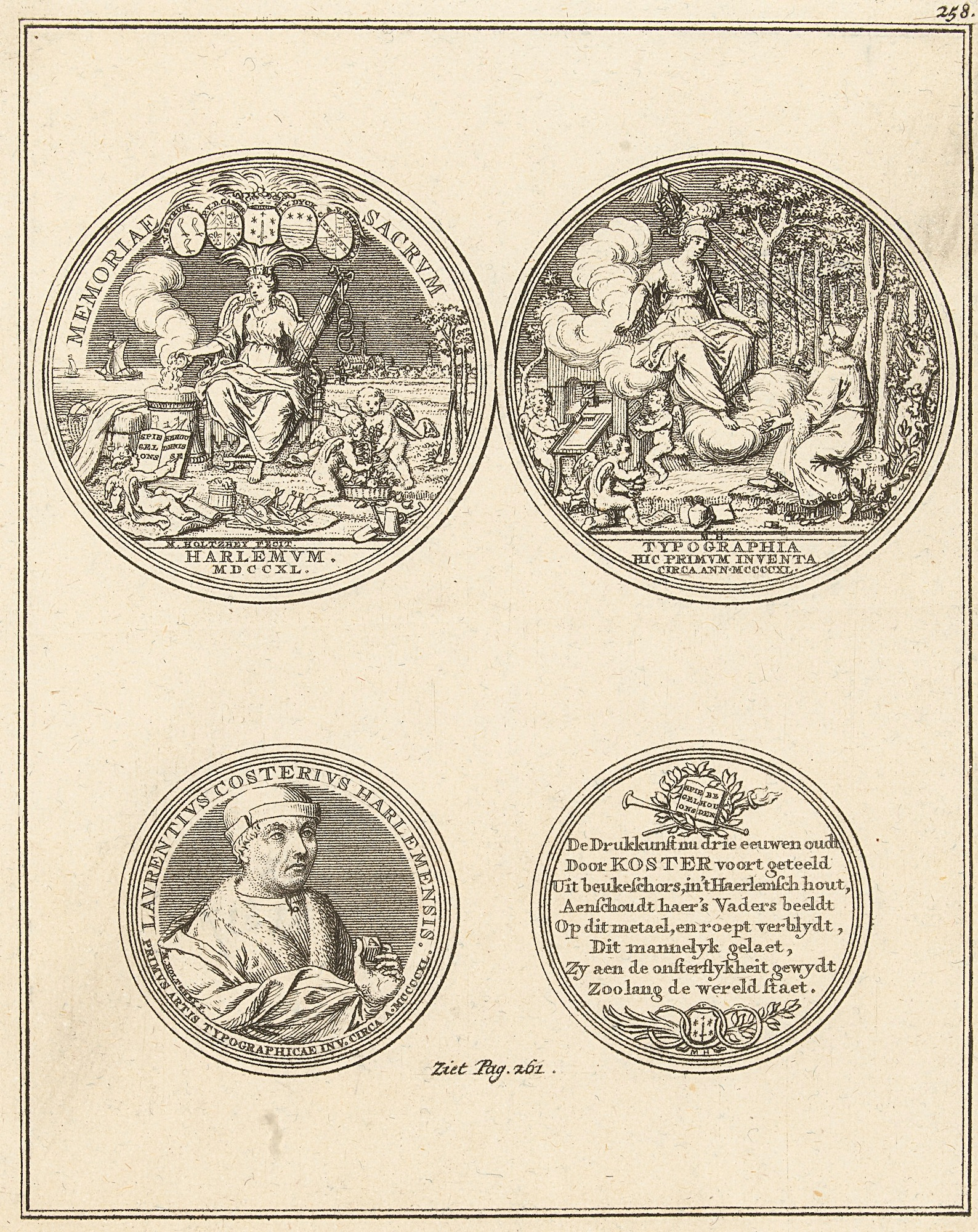
Laurens Jansz Coster 300 years of Typographia

In 1740 Martin Holtzhey produced a medal to commemorate 300 years of printing and Coster's invention. At the top of the allegorical scene, the heraldic shields of 4 men can be seen in addition to the coat of arms of Haarlem. They were all mayors of Haarlem and their names were Anthony van Styrum (1679-1756), who also served in the admiralty of Amsterdam, Pieter van der Camer (1666-1747), who commissioned his own commemorative medal to celebrate 50 years in the service of the vroedschap of Haarlem in 1743, Jan van Dyck, and Cornelis Ascanius van Sypesteyn (1694-1744), who himself was a collector of medals and who lived at Brederode. This medal set a historical precedent in Haarlem for commemorative medals; Sypesteyn's son Cornelis Ascanius van Sypesteyn (1723-1788) later became the founding director of the learned society Hollandsche Maatschappij der Wetenschappen and its offshoot, the "Oeconomische Tak", and he hired Holtzhey's son Johann Georg to commission prize medals for both societies.

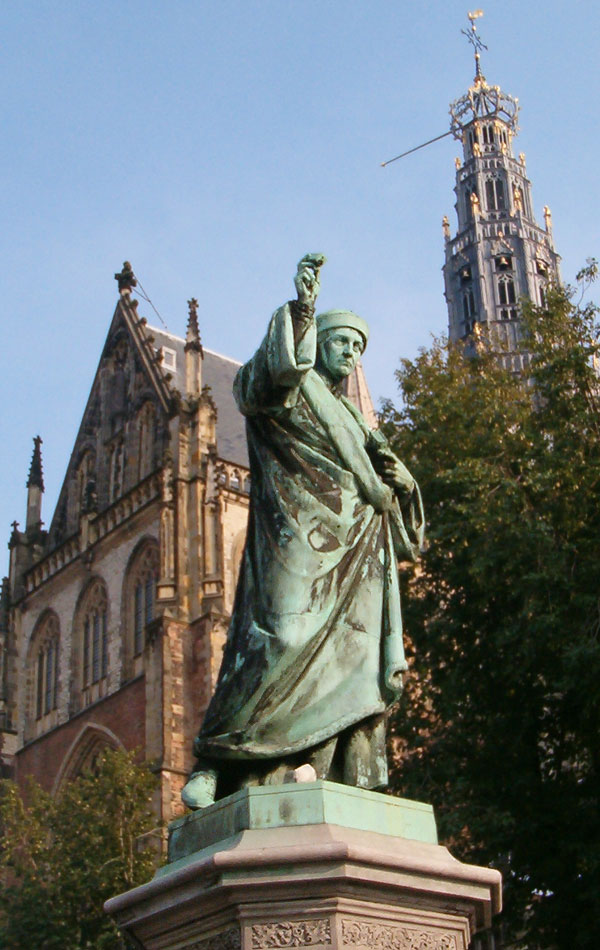
Statue of Laurens Janszoon Coster on the Grote Markt in Haarlem, where he was born. He holds the letter "A" up high.

== 400th anniversary ==
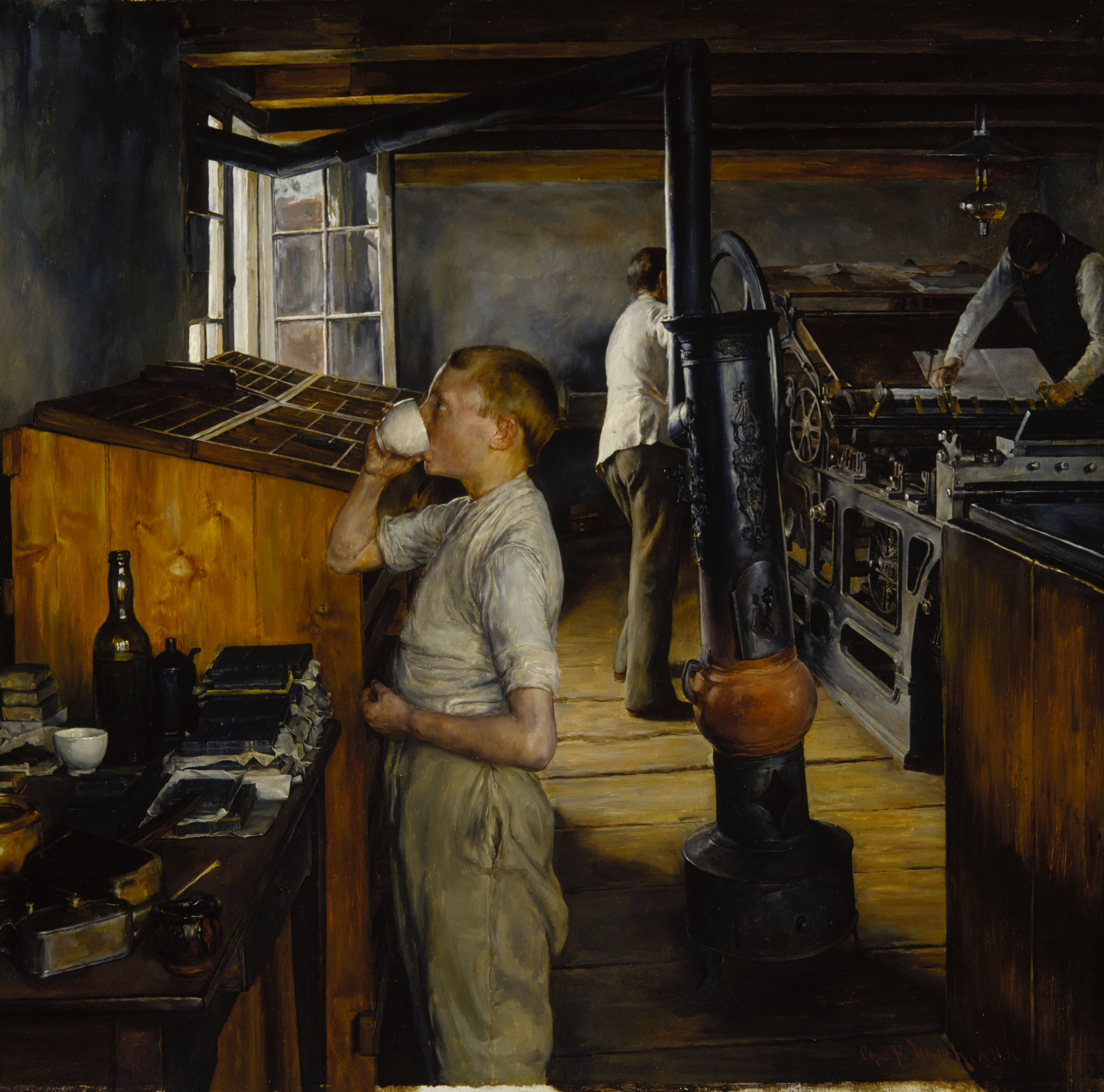
Typesetter at the Enschede printing factory (was located behind the St. Bavochurch) in 1884, painting by the American artist Charles Frederic Ulrich. At this time the story was already considered antiquated.

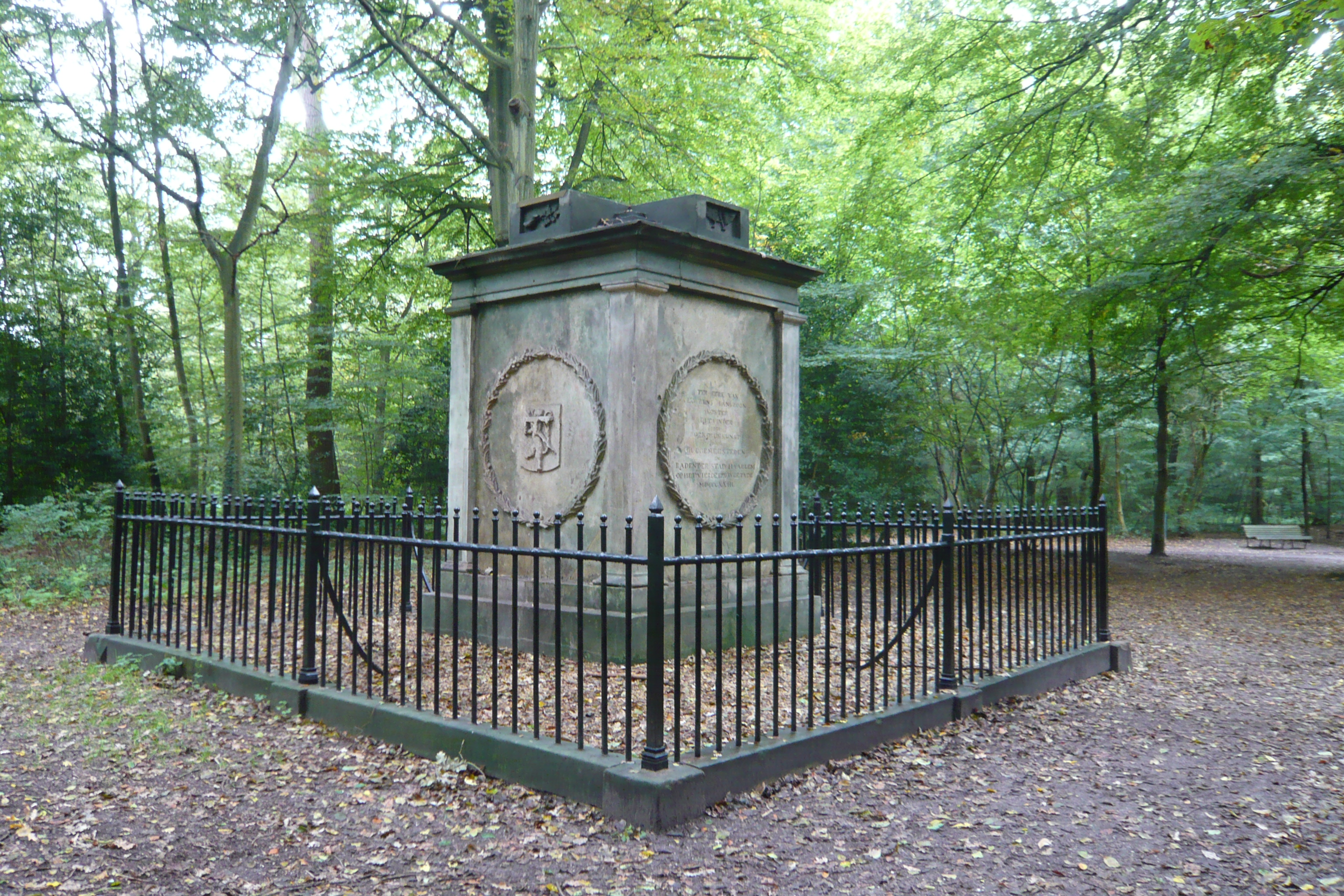
Haarlemmerhout monument to Coster erected in 1823. His gravestone was never found, so this monument was a substitute memorial.

In 1823 Haarlem celebrated the 400th anniversary of Coster's invention with a monument in the Haarlemmerhout. The monument is decorated with Latin inscriptions and a memorial text in Dutch, with symbolic "A" decorations at the top. The celebration was organized by Abraham de Vries, a Coster fan who became Haarlem's first librarian in 1821 and who received a commission from the city fathers to acquire Costeriana, or material relating to Coster's claim to fame. De Vries was supported by the professor and city council member David Jacob van Lennep, who believed the legend and sponsored De Vries by obtaining funds from the city council for the monument. In the period after the Flanders Campaign which led to the French occupation of the Netherlands from 1794 to 1815, Haarlem's economy was severely depressed and the city council sought a local hero. In 1817, Van Lennep (who was in the city council at the time) had also placed the monument De Naald (Heemstede) at his own home in nearby Heemstede.

== Joh. Enschedé ==
Behind the St. Bavochurch the printing factory of Joh. Enschedé was located, which from 1737 to 1940 printed the Oprechte Haerlemsche Courant and from 1810 onwards became a mint that printed banknotes and later postage stamps. Just as it had been in Coornhert's time, supporting the Coster legend became a publicity stunt for one of Haarlem's most important businesses, and the Enschedé company complied by offering tours of the printing presses, and even opened the Museum Enschedé in 1904 on the Klokhuisplein (now the location of a memorial plaque). Today, "Costeriana" still can be viewed (by appointment) in the collections of the Haarlem Public Library, the Museum Enschedé, and the Teylers Museum.
