= Johannes Enschedé (printer, born 1708) =

Dutch printer

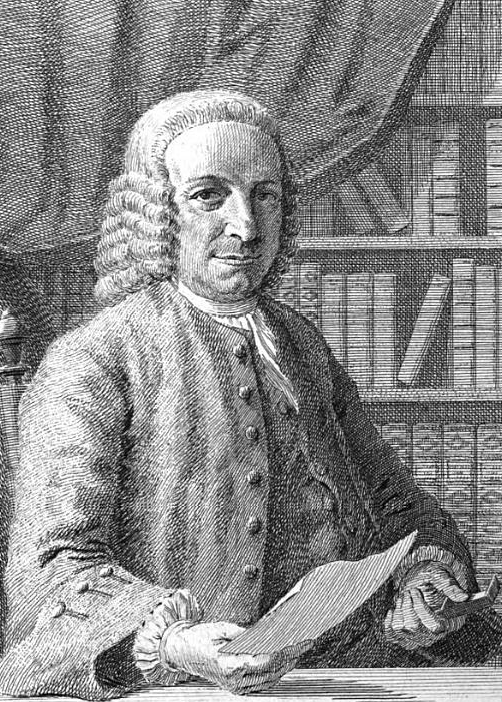
- Portrait by Cornelis van Noorde, 1768
- Born: 10 July 1708; Haarlem, Dutch Republic
- Died: 21 October 1780 (aged 72); Haarlem, Dutch Republic
- Occupations: Publisher; printer
- Spouse: Helena Hoefnagel (m. 1736)
- Children: 3, including Johannes II
- Parents: Izaak Enschedé (father); Beeltje van der Lucht (mother)

Johannes Enschedé (Haarlem, 10 July 1708 – Haarlem, 21 October 1780) was a Dutch printer, owner of Royal Joh. Enschedé and collector.

Enschedé belonged to the family that owned the company currently known as Royal Joh. Enschedé (founded by Izaak Enschedé).

On 23 December 1736, he married Helena Hoefnagel (Haarlem, 12 December 1714 – Haarlem, 20 July 1781) daughter of Adriaan Hoefnagel and Sara Brinckhorst. Johannes had three sons, which joined him in the printing business: Johannes, Jacobus, and Abraham. Johannes Enschedé collected old books, and was one of the people who tried to defend the opinion that the Haarlem book printer Laurens Janszoon Coster was the original inventor of book printing. He was a member of Teylers Tweede Genootschap (Teylers Second or Scientific Society) from its founding in 1778 until his death.
