= Joh. Enschedé =

Netherlands printer

Royal Joh. Enschedé
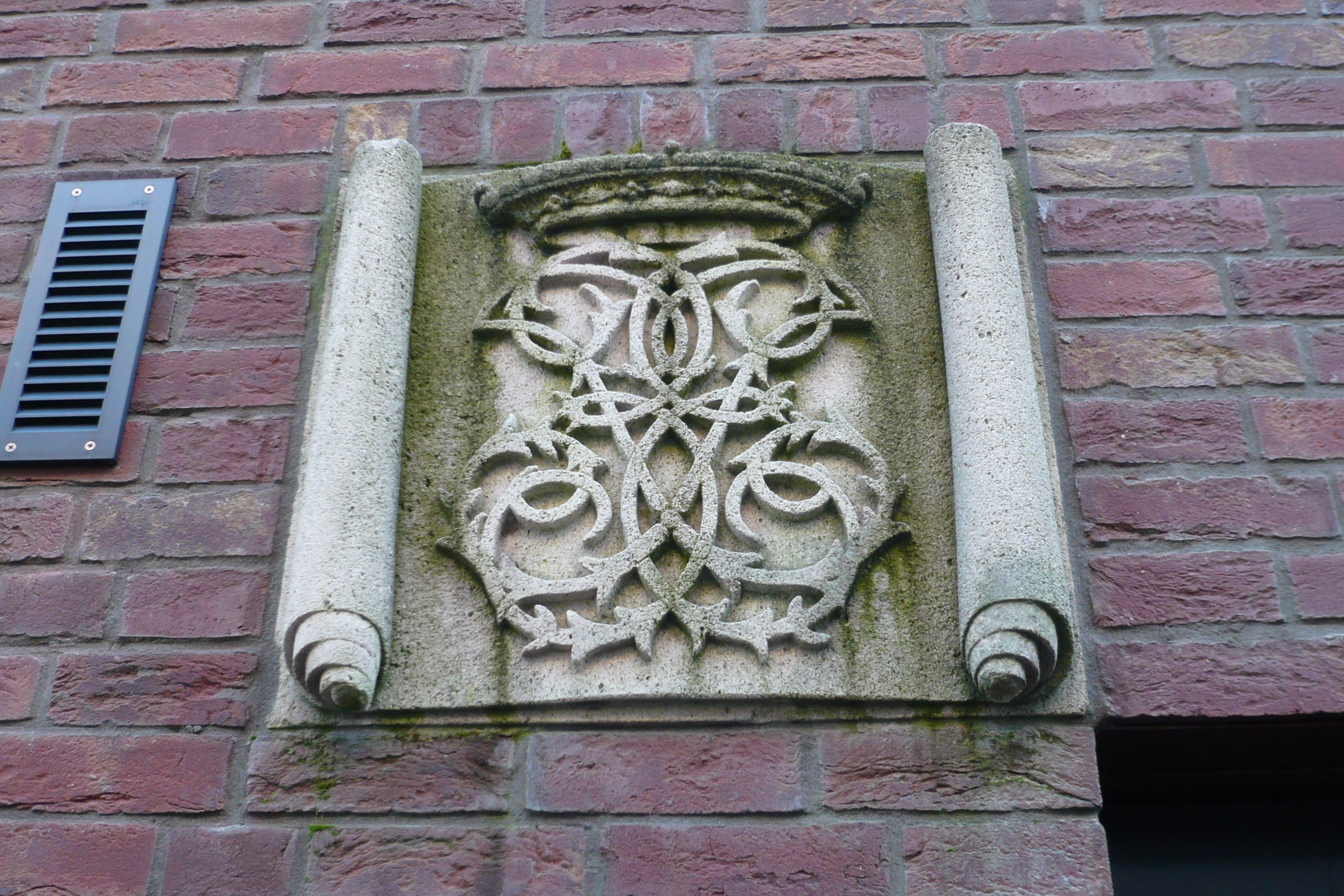
- Logo on Johan Enschedé Hof
- Native name: Koninklijke Joh. Enschedé
- Type: Private company
- Industry: Printing
- Founded: 1703; 323 years ago, in Haarlem
- Founder: Izaak Enschedé
- Headquarters: Haarlem, Netherlands
- Number of locations: Haarlem, Amsterdam and Brussels
- Area served: European Community
- Key people: Arie Piet (CEO)
- Products: Security documents, banknotes, stamps
- Services: Design, print
- Revenue: €60 million
- Owner: Authentix (2023–present)
- Number of employees: 450
- Website: joh-enschede.nl

Royal Joh. Enschedé (Dutch: Koninklijke Joh. Enschedé) is a printer of security documents, stamps and banknotes based in Haarlem, Netherlands - it specialises in print, media and security. The company hosted the Museum Enschedé until 1990 and has branches in Amsterdam, Brussels and Haarlem.

On 17 April 2023, Authentix announced that it had completed the acquisition of Joh. Enschedé.

== History ==
The company was founded in 1703, when Izaak Enschedé registered with the Printers Guild in Haarlem.

Joh. Enschedé has long been associated with the printing of banknotes; the company printed the "Robin" (Dutch: Roodborstje), the very first Dutch banknote, in 1814. Since then, Joh. Enschedé has printed the banknotes of the State of the Netherlands. In 1866, after the death of Johannes Enschedé III, Joh. Enschedé sold the family's book collection and began printing stamps.

== Typefounding ==
Enschedé began manufacturing type in 1743 after purchasing the foundry of Hendrik Wetstein, and the foundry soon became the most important part of Enschedé’s business. The famous punch-cutter Joan Michael Fleischman was employed there in the eighteenth century.

Its type business flourished throughout the eighteenth and nineteenth centuries, and in the twentieth century the foundry achieved widespread international acclaim through the design and production of types of Jan van Krimpen.

During the foundry type era, Enschedé types were distributed in the United States by Continental Type Founders Association.

=== Foundry typefaces ===
These foundry types were produced by Enschedé:

- Bavo (1939-56, Robert Harling), originally cast by Stephenson Blake as Chisel.
- Cancelleresca Bastarda (1934, Jan van Krimpen)
- Civilité (1584, Plantin), based on the 1557 design of Robert Granjon.
- Didot Floriated Capitals (1820, Pierre Didot)
- Emergo (1948-53, S.L. Hartz)
- Fleischman (1700s, Joan Michael Fleischman)
- Houtsneeletter (1927, A. van der Vossen)
- Lutetia (1925, Jan van Krimpen)
- Open Roman Capitals (1929, Jan van Krimpen)
- Romanée (1928-49, Jan van Krimpen)
- Romulus (1931, Jan van Krimpen)
- Rosart (1759, Jacques François Rosart)
- Spectrum (1952, Jan van Krimpen)

Bram de Does designed Trinité while at Enschedé, between 1979 and 1982.

Enschedé produced many other typefaces with matrices from other typefoundries for handsetting:

- Albertus (typeface)
- Annonce vet
- Folio Grotesk, halfvet, breed halfvet, small halfvet
- Klang (typeface)
- Promotor (typeface)
- Orator (typeface)

Many Monotype faces were cast on Monotype machines and delivered to the customers.

- Baskerville (typeface)
- Bembo
- Bodoni
- Gill Sans (typeface)
- Lutetia (typeface)
- Perpetua (typeface)
- Spectrum (typeface)
- Times New Roman

Besides all this Enschedé offered in the 1968 character proof:

- Monotype faces in small corpses:
- Baskerville
- Baskerville bold
- Bembo
- Bembo Bold
- Century Schoolbook
- Century Schoolbook bold
- Garamond
- Garamond italic
- Garamond bold
- Gill Sans
- Gill Sans halfbold
- Times New Roman
- Times New Roman bold
- Monophoto
- Baskerville
- Baskerville bold
- Bembo
- Bembo Bold
- Century Schoolbook
- Century Schoolbook bold
- Garamond
- Garamond italic
- Garamond bold
- Gill Sans
- Gill Sans halfbold
- Times New Roman
- Times New Roman bold
- Linotype
- Baskerville, 11D, 10D, 9D, 8D
- Spartan (typeface), 14D, 12D, 10D, 9pt, 8D, 6D
- Times New Roman, 11D, 10D, 9D, 7D, 5,5D
- Times New Roman Bold, 11D, 10D, 9D, 8D, 7D, 6D
- Intertype faces.
- Folio Grotesk 230, 12D, 10D, 9D, 8D, 6D
- Folio Grotesk half bold 228, 12D, 10D, 9D, 8D, 6D

== Anniversaries ==
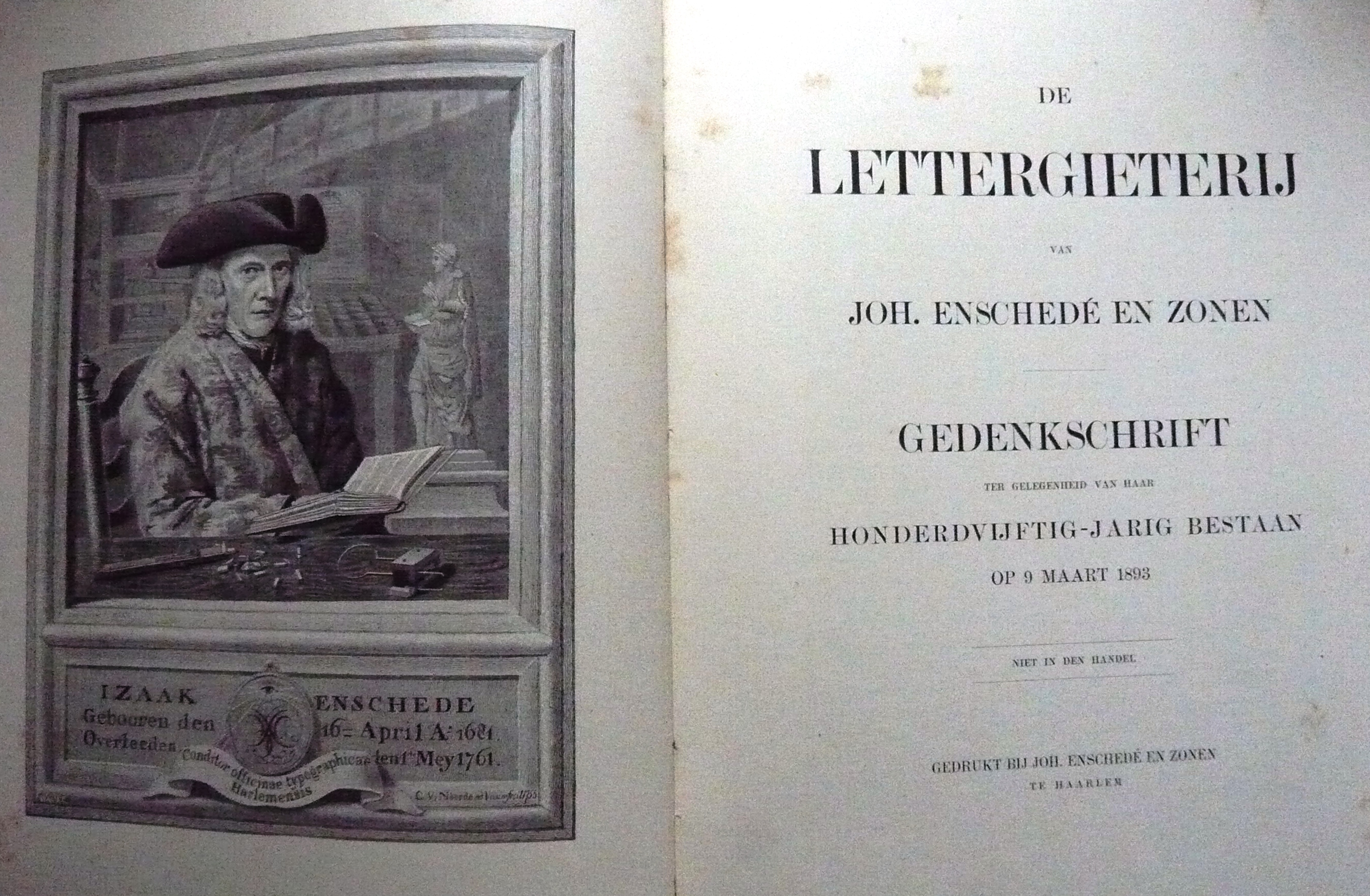
Title page of Enschedé gedenkschrift 1743-1893.

In 1893 for their 150th anniversary, a memorial book was commissioned called Enschedé gedenkschrift 1743-1893. The book was such a success that ten years later they decided to open a museum with artefacts from their archives, and in 1904 Museum Enschedé was founded in the old type foundry.

In 1978, to celebrate their 275th anniversary, Enschedé commissioned Bram de Does, one of Holland’s leading typographers, to design a digital typeface specifically for phototypesetting. The result was Trinité, a face which clearly shows its provenance and which continues the tradition of type design established at Enschedé so many years before.

During the celebrations for the company's 300th anniversary of Joh. Enschedé in 2003, the company received the designation "Royal" from Queen Beatrix.

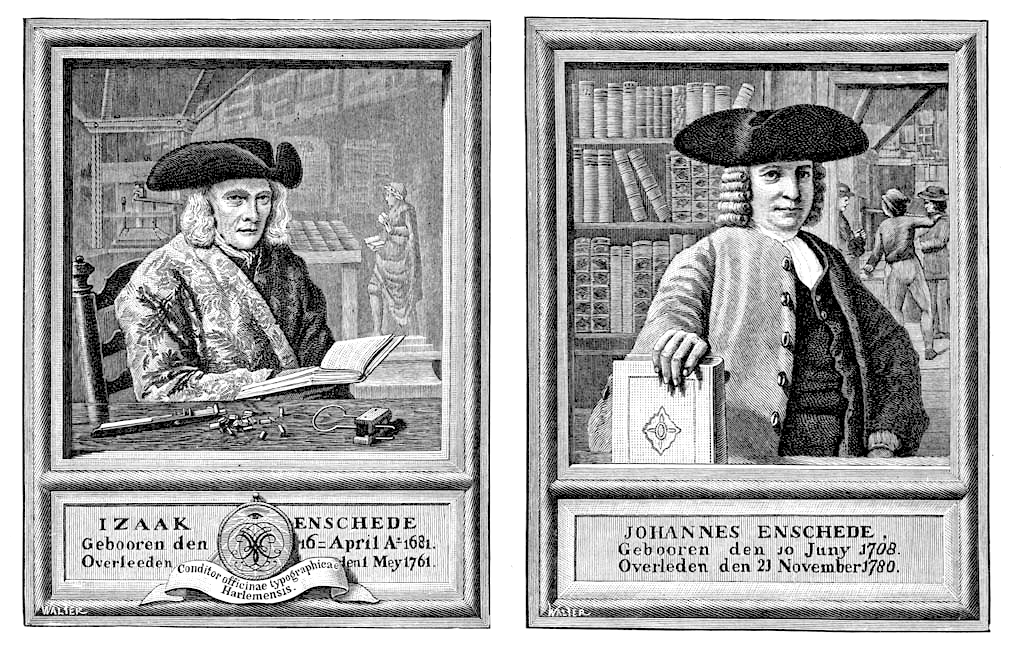
Izaak and Johan Enschede, founders

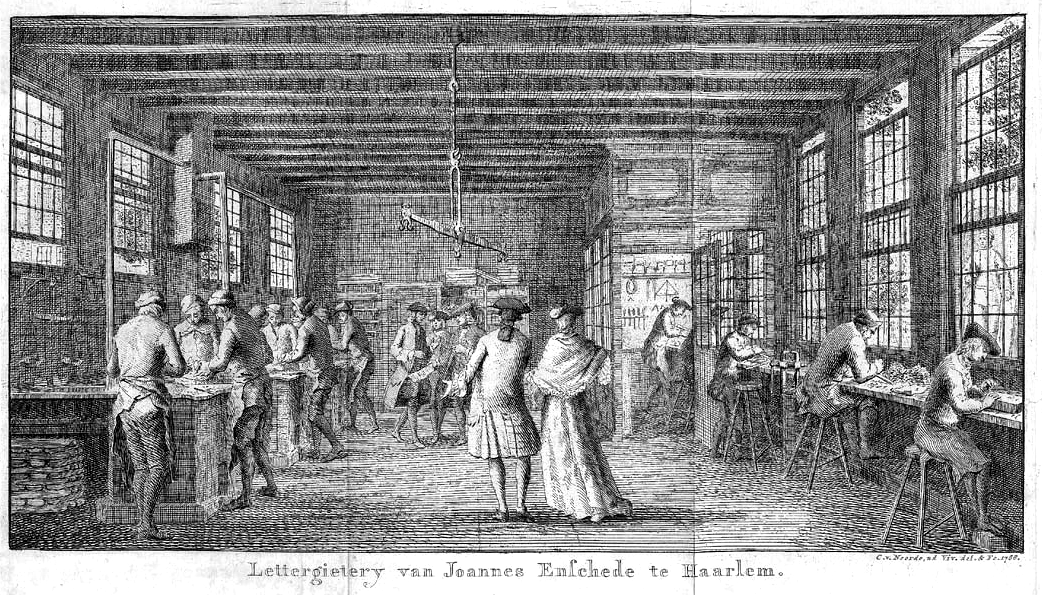
The Enschedé type foundry in Haarlem in 1768

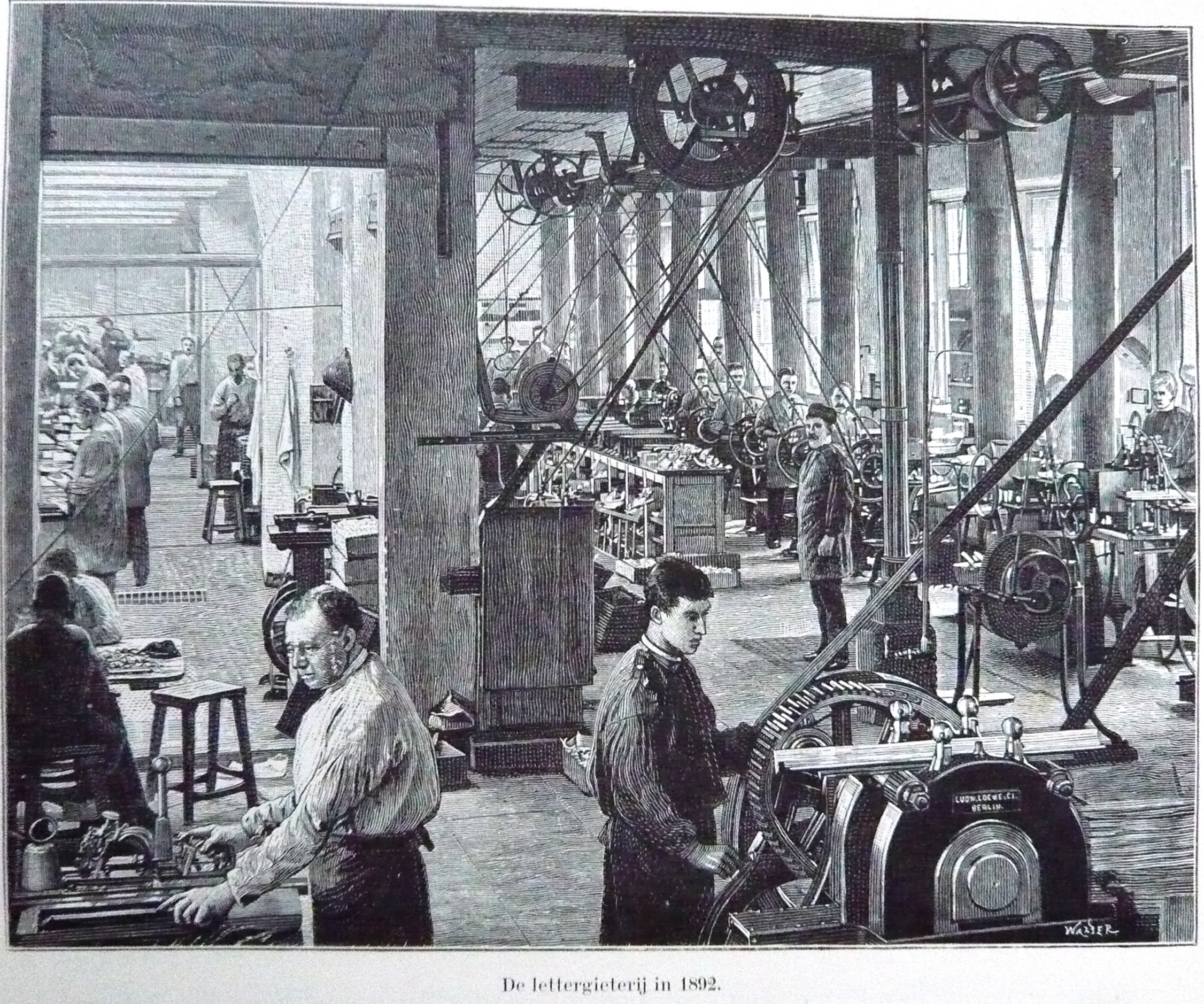
Men at work in Haarlem type foundry in 1892

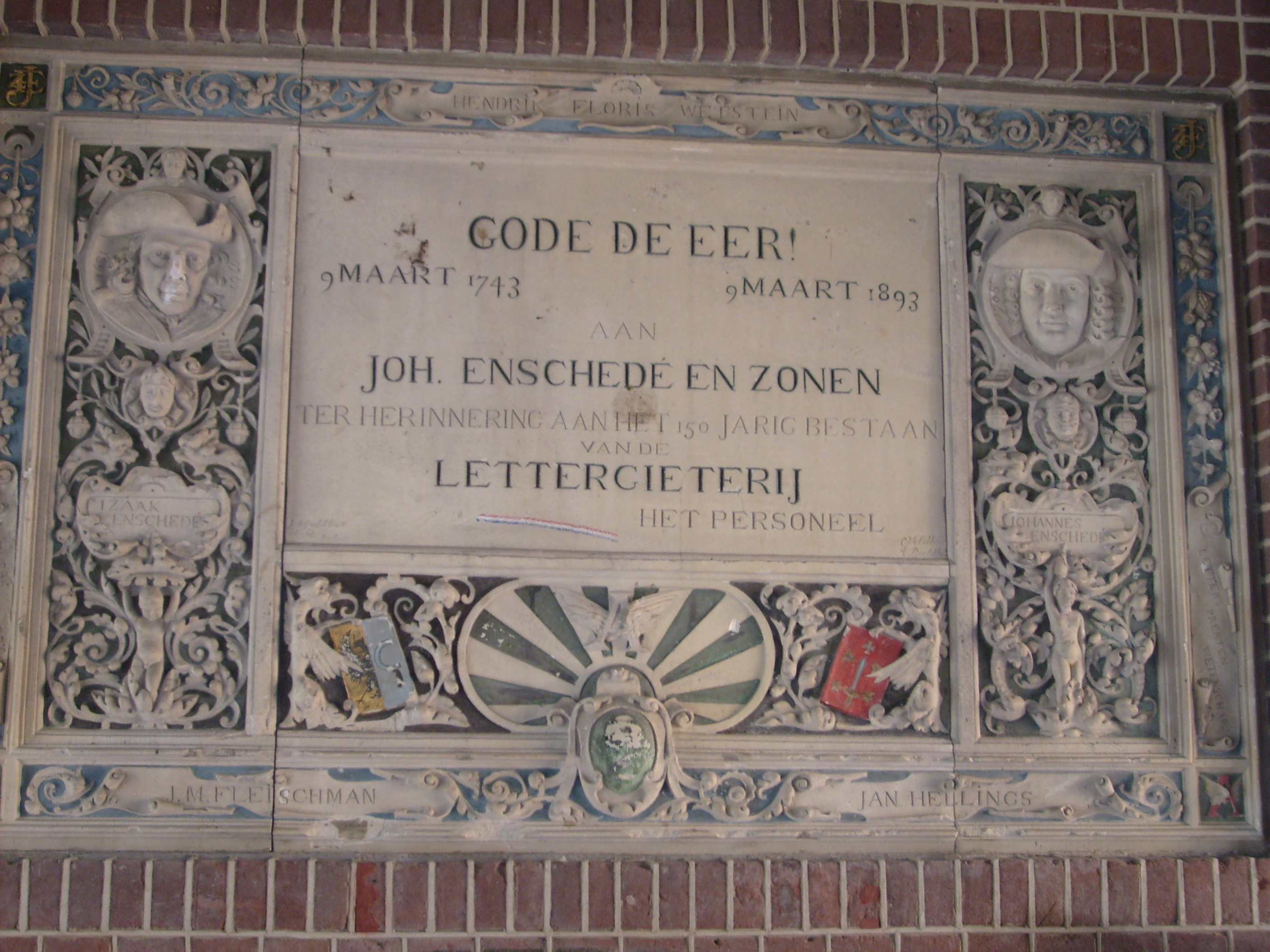
Memorial plaque on original site of Johan Enschede foundry on the Klokhuisplein behind the Sint-Bavokerk.

== Services ==
Today Joh. Enschedé specialises in security document design and printing (banknotes, postage stamps, parking permits, etc.), commercial print (annual reports, catalogues) and online document publication.

The company is a certified Euro banknotes printer, and produces euro notes for five EU countries.

Joh. Enschedé prints stamps for more than sixty countries.

== Controversies ==
In 2016 reports emerged of the theft of 'a significant sum' of 50 euro notes at Joh. Enschedé during the course of two years. According to Dutch police, the theft was committed by several employees of the company.
