= List of members of Teylers Tweede Genootschap =

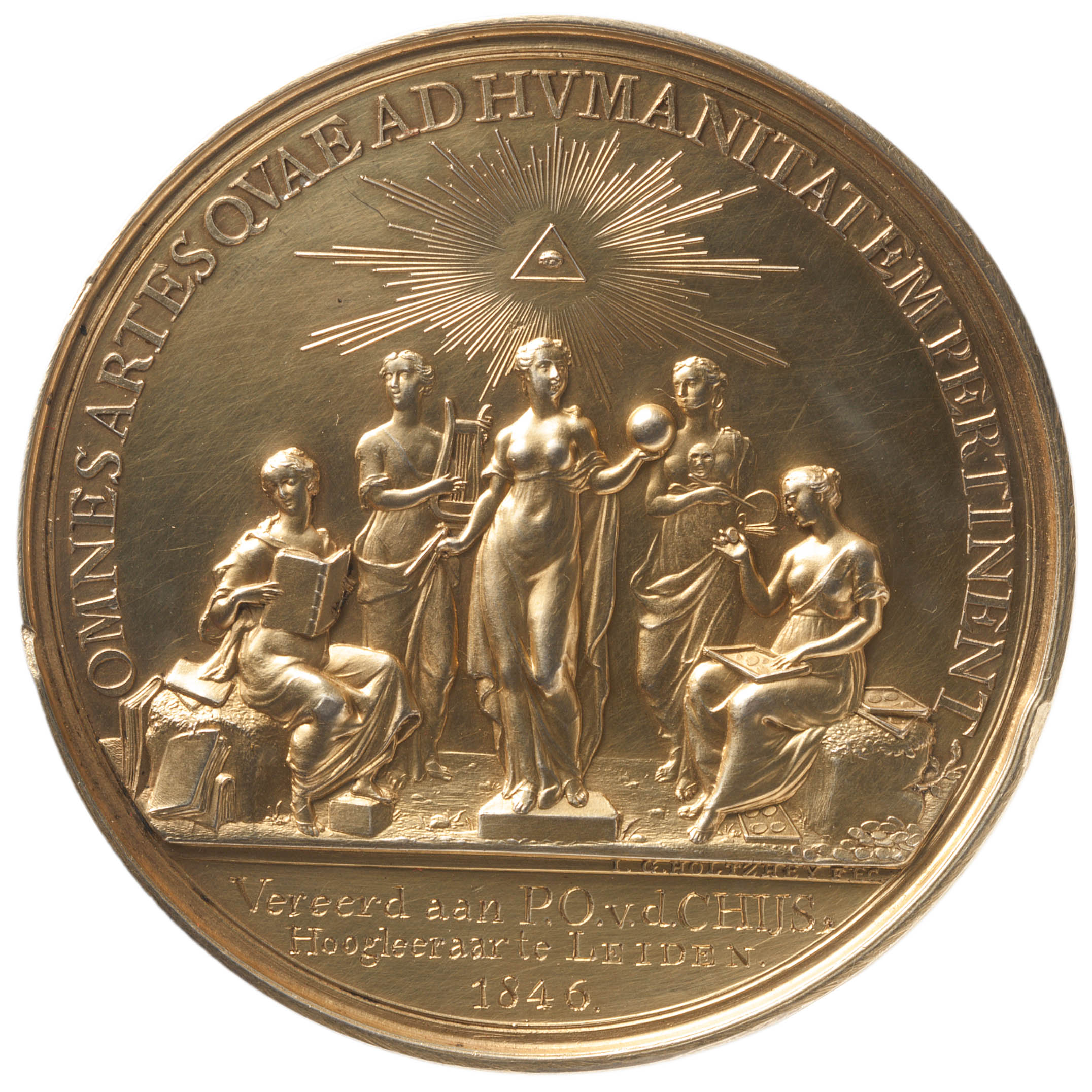
Johann Georg Holtzhey, competition medal of Teylers Second Society in Haarlem, awarded to Pieter Otto van der Chijs in 1846, silver (gilded later) (obverse). Collection Teylers Museum, Haarlem, The Netherlands

This is a list of members of the Teylers Tweede Genootschap (Teylers Second Society) by year of appointment. There are six members in the society. The dates shown indicate the terms of the members, who generally serve for life, though they had to be residents of Haarlem under the age of 70, so sometimes they retired early.

== Original appointed members ==
The original members as appointed by testament of Pieter Teyler van der Hulst were:

- Gerrit Willem van Oosten de Bruijn (1778–1797)
- Cornelis Elout (1778–1779)
- Jan Bosch (1778–1780)
- Johannes Enschedé Sr. (1778–1780)
- Jean le Clé (1778–1802)
- Bernardus Vriends (1778–1791)

== Later members ==
Members that were added later:

- Martinus van Marum (1779–1837)
- Jean Gijsbert Decker (1780–1808), resigned
- Willem Anne Lestevenon (1780–1797), resigned
- Pieter Hermannes Klaarenbeek (1791–1797), resigned
- Johannes Enschedé Jr. (1797–1799)
- Jan van der Roest (1797–1814)
- Jossue Teyssedre l'Ange (1797–1853)
- Christiaan Brunings (1799–1805)
- Adriaan van den Ende (1802–1842), resigned
- Joseph Chrysostomus Bernardus Bernard (1805–1836), resigned
- Pieter Hermannes Klaarenbeek (1811–1812), resigned
- Adriaan van der Willigen (1812–1841)
- Caspar Georg Carl Reinwardt (1814–1854)
- Johannes Enschedé III (1836–1866)
- Jacobus Albertus van Bemmelen (1838–1853)
- Jacques Gisbert Samuel van Breda (1841–1867)
- Jan Justus Enschedé (1842–1850), resigned
- Hugo Beijerman (1850–1870)
- Peter Elias (1853–1878)
- Jan Geel (1853–1858), resigned
- Jan van der Hoeven (1854–1868)
- Jeronimo de Bosch Kemper (1858–1876)
- Volkert Simon Maarten van der Willigen (1866–1878)
- Adriaan van der Willigen Pz. (1867–1876), resigned
- Douwe Lubach (1868–1902)
- Robert Jacobus Fruin (1870–1899)
- Adriaan Justus Enschedé (1876–1896)
- Arie Cornelis Kruseman (1876–1894)
- Carel Johannes Matthes (1878–1882)
- Elisa van der Ven (1878–1909)
- Hendrik Jacob Scholten (1882–1907)
- Jeronimo de Vries (1894–1914), resigned
- Theodorus Marinus Roest (1896–1898)
- Johan Wilhelmus Stephanik (1898–1905)
- Pieter Lodewijk Muller (1899–1904)
- Hugo de Vries (1902–1935)
- Petrus Johannes Blok (1905–1929)
- Henri Jean de Dompierre de Chaufpié (1905–1911)
- Ernst Wilhelm Moes (1907–1911)
- Hendrik Antoon Lorentz (1909–1928)
- Adolf Octave van Kerkwijk (1911–1949), resigned
- Cornelis Hofstede de Groot (1912–1930)
- Gerard Kalff (1914–1924)
- Jan Willem Muller (1928–1957)
- Adriaan Daniël Fokker (1930–1945), resigned
- Johan Huizinga (1930–1945)
- Wilhelm Martin (1930–1954)
- Lourens Baas Becking (1935–1940), resigned; (1941–1945), resigned
- Jan Steffen Bartstra (1945–1959)
- Pieter Nicolaas van Eyck (1945–1950), resigned
- Victor Jacob Koningsberger (1946–1965)
- Johan Willem Frederiks (1949–1959)
- Pieter Minderaa (1950–1965)
- Johan Quirijn van Regteren Altena (1954–1970)
- Jacob Kistemaker (1957 – ?)
- Hendrik Enno van Gelder (1959 – ?)
- Johan Christiaan Boogman (1959 – ?)
- Cornelis Frederik Petrus Stutterheim (1965–1973)
- Maurits Henri van Raalte (1965 – ?)
- Sturla Jonasson Gudlaugsson (1970–1971)
- Theodoor Herman Lunsingh Scheurleer (1971 – ?)
- Henri Albert Gomperts (1973 – ?)
- Harm Habing (? – 2008/2009)
- Rob Visser (? ––2012/2013)
- Ilja Veldman (? – 2014/2015)
- Arent Pol (? –current) -->
- Louise Vet (? –current) -->
- Niek van Sas (? –current)
- Wim van Anrooij (? –current)
- Wim van Saarloos (2008/2009–current)
- Frans van Lunteren (2012/2013–current)
- Yvonne Bleyerveld (2014/2015–current)
