= Gay van der Meer =

Dutch numismatist and curator (1924–2014)

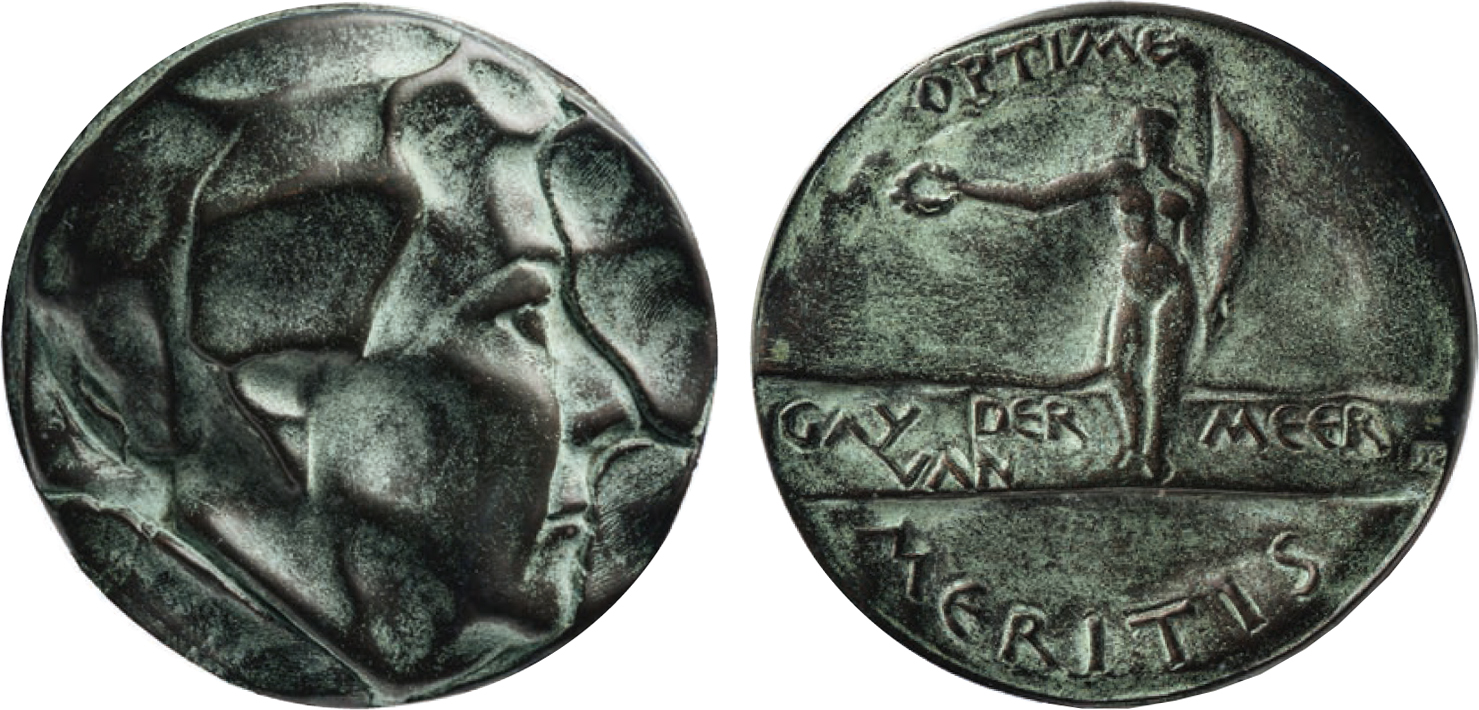
- Medal dedicated to Van der Meer
- Born: 5 June 1924
- Died: 9 August 2014 (aged 90)
- Occupations: Numismatist, curator
- Employer: Rijksmuseum Het Koninklijk Penningkabinet
- Known for: Work on Anglo-Saxon coinage
- Awards: Brenner Medal

Gatske "Gay" van der Meer (5 June 1924 – 9 August 2014) was a Dutch numismatist, who specialised in early medieval coinage of Britain, as well as historic and contemporary medallic art. Van der Meer was awarded the Brenner Medal, and was an honorary member of the British Numismatic Society and the Svenska Numismatiska Föreningen. She was also appointed Officer in the Order of Orange Nassau and was a member of Teylers Tweede Genootschap.

== Early life and education ==
Van der Meer was born on 5 June 1924. Her brother, Simon van der Meer, became a physicist and was awarded the Nobel Prize. In 1943 she graduated from school and went to work in an import and export business. During the Dutch famine of 1944–1945 she remained in Friesland, and in 1946 was working for the same business as previously.

In a move to Paris she contracted tuberculosis, and during her recovery she listened to the BBC - later stating that this made her want to undertake further academic study. She moved to Amsterdam and in 1957 graduated with a degree in English and Linguistics. Van der Meer wanted to continue to study for a PhD, but this ambition was initially halted as the Dutch government would not fund women to study to PhDs. On a scoping trip to the British Museum she learnt that they were looking to recruit someone to work on names on Anglo-Saxon coins, and she subsequently began her PhD in this field with Michael Dolley in 1958.

== Career ==
In 1959 she started her work at the Rijksmuseum Het Koninklijk Penningkabinet (nl), where she was first an assistant and then curator of the medal collection. In the 1960s she worked on the coins in the collection of Robert Bruce Cotton, in collaboration with Michael Dolley and Christopher Blunt. It was her discovery of a manuscript that enabled scholarship to understand what was missing from the Cotton collection. She also had a long-standing research interest into the tokens of the Holtzhey family. She also studied Gillis Anselmo's album amicorum. In 1963 she was appointed Acting Director of the Het Koninklijk Penningkabinet, a role she held until 1984. From her position at the Penningkabinet, she compiled the Dutch entry for Fédération Internationale de la médaille d'Art (FIDEM) from 1969 to 1990.

Gay held a series of voluntary positions, often for many years, supporting specialist organisations in the field. From 1966 to 1973 she was secretary of the Royal Dutch Society for Coins and Medals, where she received the literature prize in 1978 and was made an honorary member in 1984. In 1986 she became a member of Teylers Tweede Genootschap and as honorary curator of the Numismatic Cabinet of Teylers Museum.

In 1991 Geer Steyn created a medal in her honour, inspired by some the medals that Van der Meer studied by Martinus and Johan George Holtzhey.

Van der Meer died on 9 August 2014.

== Awards and honours ==
- 1968, appointed an honorary member of Svenska Numismatiska Föreningen.
- 1979, awarded the Brenner Medal.
- 1985, appointed Officer in the Order of Orange Nassau.
- 1986, appointed honorary member of the British Numismatic Society.

== Selected works ==
- Van der meer, G. (1962). A Second Anglo-Saxon Coin of Reading. British Numismatic Journal 31. Vol 31, pp. 161-162.
- Van Der Meer, Gay. "Sir Robert Bruce Cotton and His Illuminated Genesis Manuscript." Netherlands Yearbook for History of Art/Nederlands Kunsthistorisch Jaarboek Online 16.1 (1965): 3-15.
