= Holtzhey =

Holtzhey is a surname. Notable people with the surname include:

- Martin Holtzhey (1697–1764), German minter
- Johann Georg Holtzhey (1729–1808), Dutch minter
