= Biografisch Portaal =

Dutch biographical database

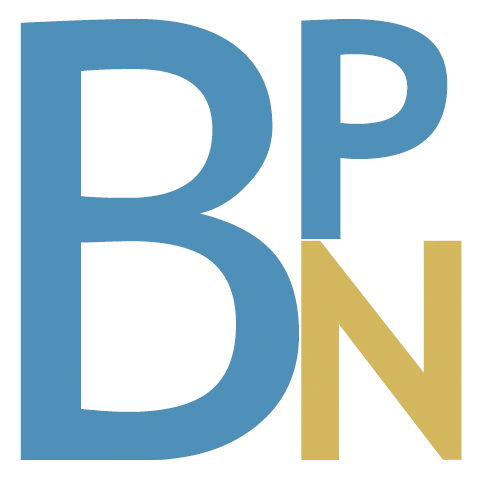
Logo

The Biografisch Portaal (Biography Portal) is an initiative based at the Huygens Institute for Dutch History in Amsterdam, with the aim of making biographical texts of the Netherlands more accessible.

The project was started in February 2010 with material for 40,000 digitized biographies, with the goal to grant digital access to all reliable information about (deceased) people of the Netherlands from the earliest beginnings of history up to modern times.

The Netherlands as a geographic term includes former colonies, and the term "people" refers both to people born in the Netherlands and its former colonies, and also to people born elsewhere but active in the Netherlands and its former colonies. As of 2011, only biographical information about deceased people is included. The system used is based on the standards of the Text Encoding Initiative. Access to the Biografisch Portaal is available free through a web-based interface.

The project is a cooperative undertaking by ten scientific and cultural bodies in the Netherlands with the Huygens Institute as main contact. The other bodies are:

- The Biografie Instituut
- The Centraal Bureau voor Genealogie (CBG)
- The Digital Library for Dutch Literature (DBNL)
- Data Archiving and Networked Services (DANS)
- The International Institute of Social History (IISG)
- The Onderzoekscentrum voor Geschiedenis en Cultuur (OGC),
- The Parlementair Documentatie Centrum (PDC)
- The Netherlands Institute for Art History (RKD)

Besides ongoing digital projects, Dutch biographical dictionaries originally published in book form that have been digitized and incorporated into the indexes of the Biografisch Portaal are:

- The work of Abraham van der Aa, which was the first Dutch biographical dictionary
- The BWN, or Biografisch Woordenboek van Nederland
- The NNBW, or Nieuw Nederlandsch Biografisch Woordenboek
- The work of Johan Engelbert Elias on the Amsterdam regency known as Vroedschap van Amsterdam
- The work of Barend Glasius known as Godgeleerd Nederland
- The work of Roeland van Eynden and Adriaan van der Willigen, known as Geschiedenis der vaderlandsche schilderkunst
- The work of Jan van Gool known as Nieuwe Schouburg
- The work of Jacob Campo Weyerman known as The Lives of Dutch painters and paintresses
- The BLNP, or Biografisch lexicon voor de geschiedenis van het Nederlands protestantisme

As of November 2012 the Biografisch Portaal contained 80,206 persons in 125,592 biographies. In February 2012, a new project was started called "BiographyNed" to build an analytical tool for use with the Biografisch Portaal that will link biographies to events in time and space. The main goal of the three-year project is to formulate 'the boundaries of the Netherlands'.

== See also ==
- List of Dutch people
