= Elout =

Elout, sometimes spelled with numerous alternative spellings, is a Dutch surname, and can refer to:

- François Elout (1519-1600), Belgian/Dutch painter.
- François Elout (1589-1635), Dutch painter.
- Cornelis Elout (1714 - 1779), collector and member of Teylers Tweede Genootschap.
- Cornelis Pieter Elout (1741 - 1796), manufacturer and council member of Haarlem. Son of Cornelis Elout.
- Cornelis Theodorus Elout (1767 - 1841), Dutch cabinet minister.
- Cornelis Pieter Jacob Elout (1795 - 1843), Dutch Major General and resident in the Dutch Indies. Son of Cornelis Theodorus Elout.
- Maurits Theodorus Elout (1808 - 1889), Dutch military during the Belgian independence struggle. Son of Cornelis Theodorus Elout.
- Cornelis Hendrik Elout, Dutch politician and mayor of Domburg.
- Cornelis Karel Elout (1870 - 1947), Dutch journalist and writer. Son of Cornelis Hendrik Elout.
- Mies Elout Soeterwoude-Drabbe (1875 - 1956), Dutch painter and drawer.
- Johanna Madeleine Selleger-Elout (1875 - 1957), Dutch writer.
