= Adriaan van der Willigen Pz. =

Dutch medical doctor and historian

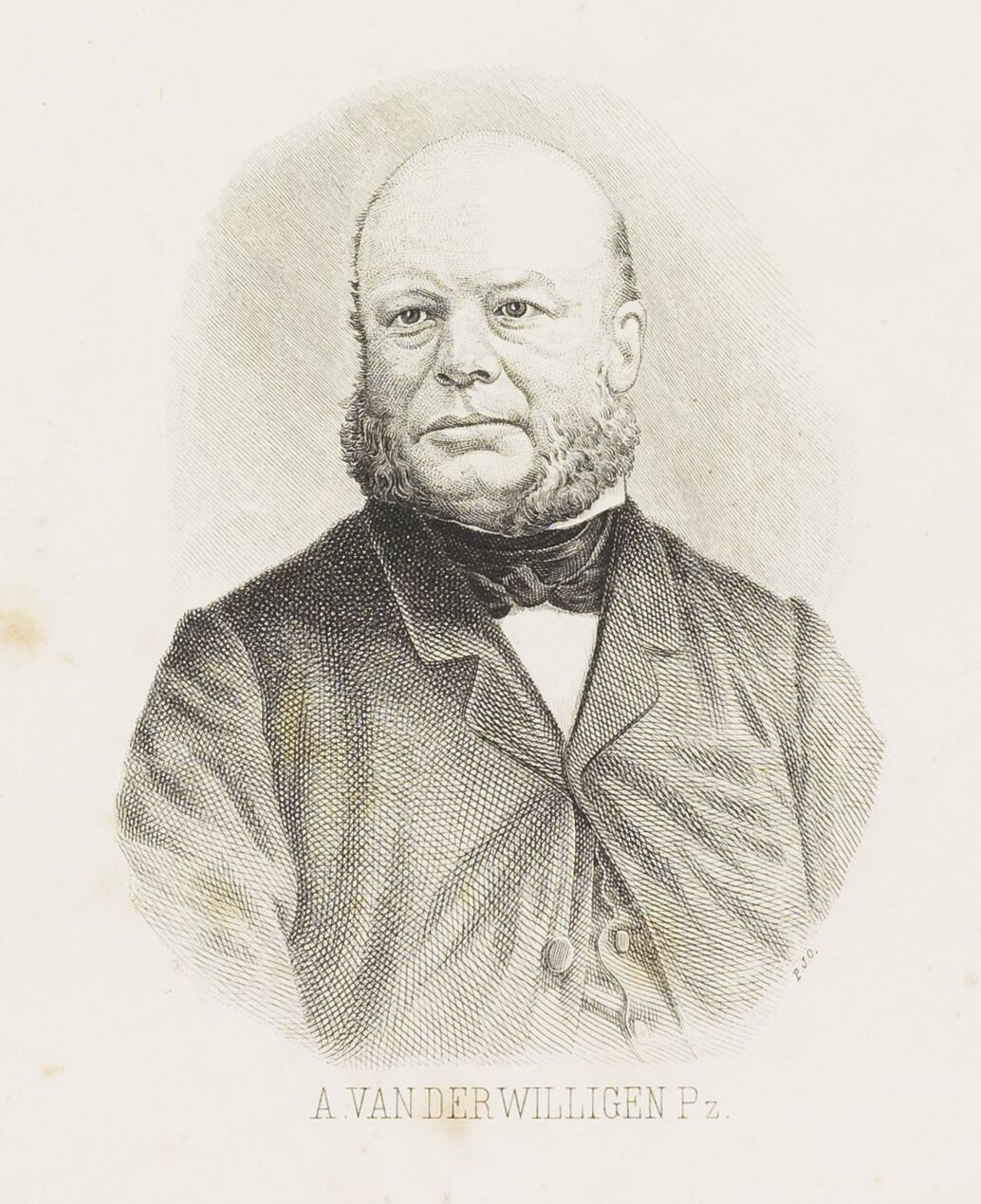
Adriaan van der Willigen Pz.

Adriaan van der Willigen Pz. (20 September 1810 – 22 August 1876) was a 19th-century medical doctor and historian from the Netherlands.

== Biography ==
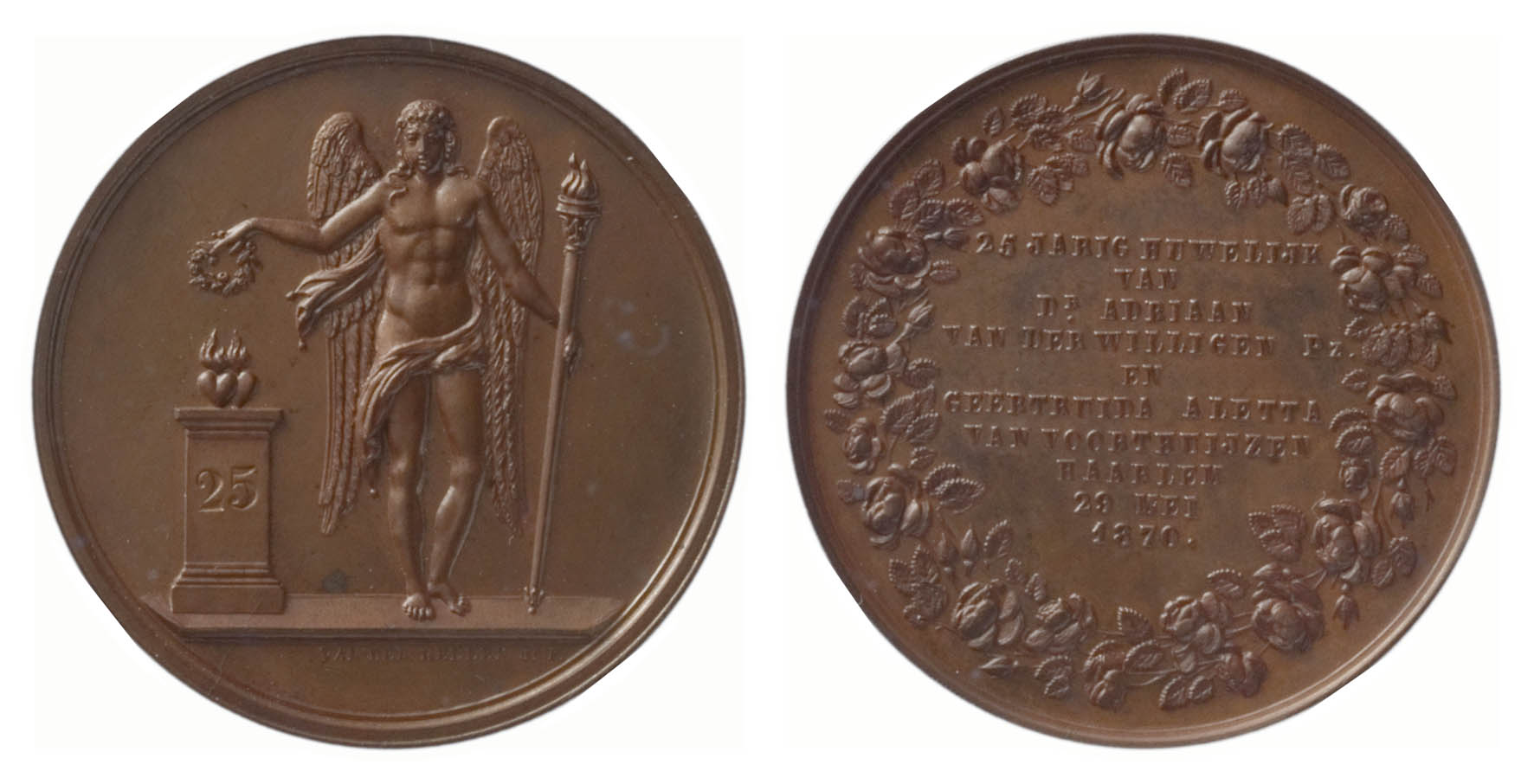
Silver wedding anniversary coin (1870)

According to the RKD he was born in Hillegom, the son of Pieter van der Willigen and a nephew of Adriaan van der Willigen, who left him an art collection and library which he expanded. He was married 29 May 1845 to Geertruyda Aletta van Voorthuysen and set up a practise in Haarlem, where he became a member of Teylers Tweede Genootschap. Like his uncle whom he was named after, he had a great love of art history and wrote many important works on Dutch painters as a result of research in the Haarlem archives, most notably on the members of the Haarlem Guild of St. Luke. In later years he had to leave his practice due to illness and moved to Rhedersteeg, where he later died.

== Works ==
- Geschiedkundige aanteekeningen over Haarlemsche schilders en andere by Adriaan Pz van der Willigen on Google books
