= Ilja Veldman =

Dutch art historian

Ilja M. Veldman
- Born: 10 September 1944 (age 82); Amsterdam, Netherlands
- Known for: Research on iconography, iconology, printmaking, drawing, book illustration, stained glass, the Reformation, and Maarten van Heemskerck

Academic background
- Education: University of Amsterdam

Academic work
- Discipline: Art history
- Sub-discipline: Early modern Netherlandish art
- Institutions: University of Amsterdam; Vrije Universiteit Amsterdam

Ilja M. Veldman (born 10 September 1944) is a Dutch art historian.

She specializes in Netherlandish visual art from c. 1400 to 1700, especially iconography and iconology, printmaking and drawing, book illustration, stained glass, the Reformation, and artistic relations between the Low Countries and Italy.

== Career ==
Veldman was born on 10 September 1944 in Amsterdam. Veldman studied art history and archaeology at the University of Amsterdam. In 1977 she obtained her PhD from the same university under J. de Bruyn with a thesis titled: Scholarly and moralistic themes in the work of Maarten van Heemskerck. From 1969 to 1984, she worked at the university's Art History Institute, later as senior staff member. In 1984, she was appointed professor of art history at the Vrije Universiteit Amsterdam, where she remained until taking early emeritus status in 2006.

From 1971 onward, she published widely in art-historical journals, books, and exhibition catalogues in the Netherlands and abroad. Her dissertation, Maarten van Heemskerck and Dutch Humanism in the Sixteenth Century (1977), received the Karel van Manderprijs.

From 1977 to 2008, she served on the editorial board of Simiolus. In 1997, she was elected a member of the Royal Netherlands Academy of Arts and Sciences. She also served as a member and chair of Teylers Tweede Genootschap in Haarlem.

In March 2019, the Maatschappij der Nederlandse Letterkunde awarded her its Prijs voor Meesterschap for her scholarly oeuvre.

In 2024, she served as guest curator for the major Maarten van Heemskerck exhibition presented by the Frans Hals Museum, Stedelijk Museum Alkmaar, and Teylers Museum, and contributed to the accompanying monograph.

== Selected works ==
- Maarten van Heemskerck and Dutch Humanism in the Sixteenth Century.
- De Wereld tussen Goed en Kwaad. Late prenten van Coornhert.
- The New Hollstein: Maarten van Heemskerck.
- Images of Labor and Diligence in Sixteenth-Century Netherlandish Prints: The Work Ethic Rooted in Civic Morality or Protestantism?.
- The Old Testament as a Moral Code: Old Testament Stories as Exempla of the Ten Commandments.
- The Two Sides of Nature: An Allegory by Maarten van Heemskerck.
- Images for the Eye and Soul: Function and Meaning in Netherlandish Prints (1450-1650).
- Crispijn de Passe and his Progeny (1564-1670): A Century of Print Production.
- Profit and Pleasure: Print Books by Crispijn de Passe.
- The Netherlandish Drawings of the 16th Century in Teylers Museum.
- A Rediscovered Painting by Maarten van Heemskerck: A Moral Allegory in the Form of a Prodigal Son.
- Maarten van Heemskerck 1498-1574.
