= Geschiedenis der Vaderlandsche Schilderkunst =

Dictionary first published in 1816

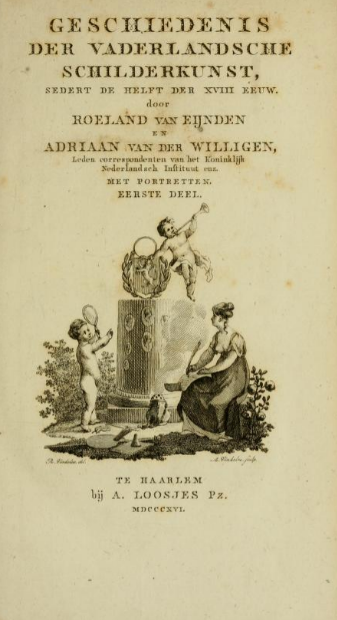
- Title page for Geschiedenis der Vaderlandsche Schilderkunst (1816)
- Author: Roeland van Eynden
- Publication date: 1816

The Geschiedenis der Vaderlandsche Schilderkunst, often called Van Eynden and Van der Willigen, is a 19th-century dictionary of artist biographies from the Netherlands published 1816-1842.

The reference work was started by Roeland van Eynden, a painter and writer from the Northern Netherlands, as a follow-up to the work published by Arnold Houbraken and Jan van Gool. The work was published first in two volumes listing painters active before 1800. The third volume was published with contemporary painters, and it was finished after Van Eynden's death by publishing a 4th volume with corrections and additions which was written by his friend and colleague, Adriaan van der Willigen, a Dutch writer known for his travelogues.
