= Teylers Coin and Medal Room =

Teylers Museum rooms

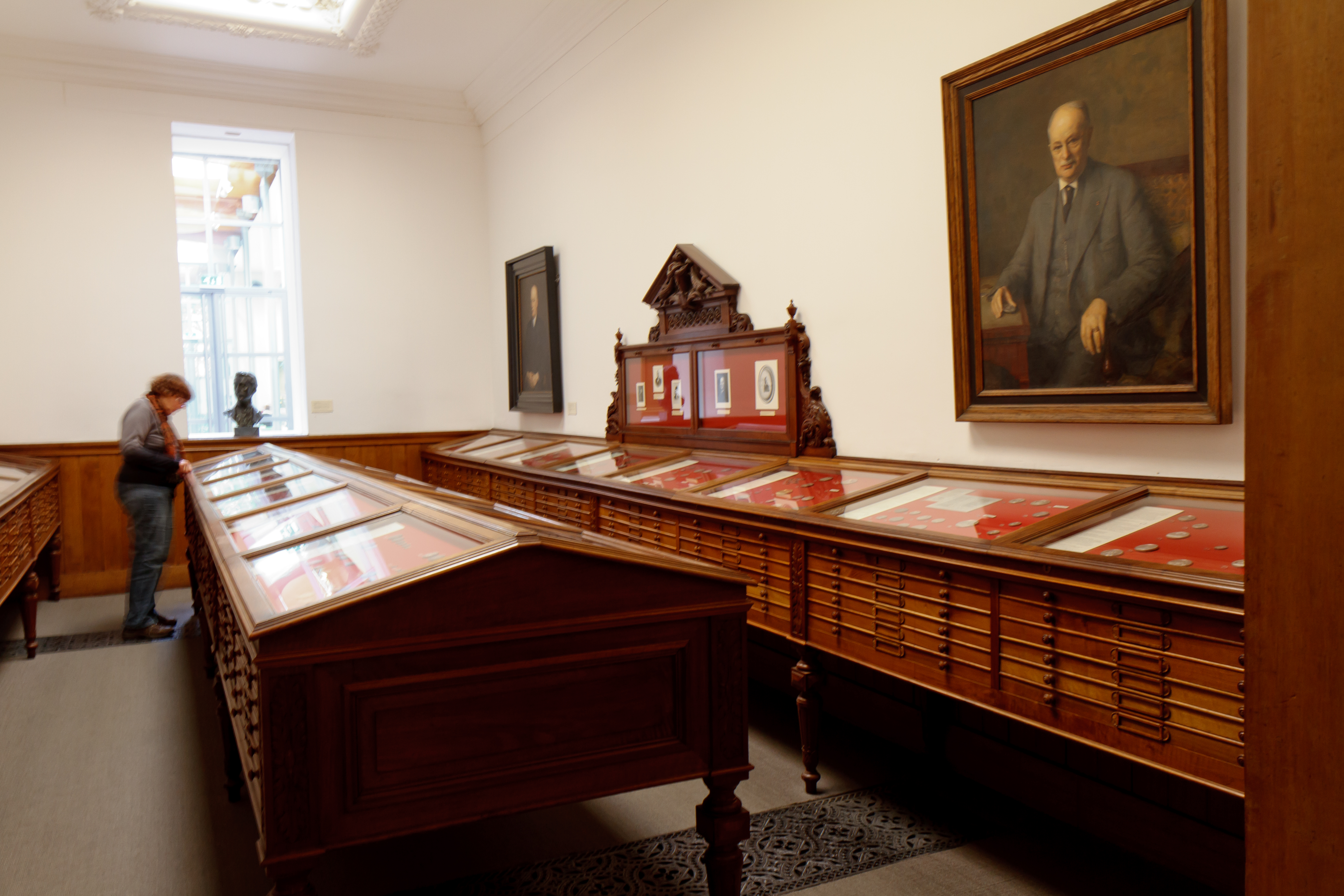
Teylers Coin and Medal Room

The Teylers Coin and Medal Room, or Numismatisch Kabinet, is a small display room in Teylers Museum that was designed in 1888 and furnished with special display cabinets in 1889.

== History ==
In 1884 the expansion of the museum, called "Nieuwe Museum" (New Museum), with the addition of the entrance on the Spaarne river and the new Fossil rooms, had just been completed to commemorate 100 years of exhibits in the Oval Room. At the same time, the small room that had formerly been used for fossils was set up for use by the coin and medal collection. Pieter Teyler's personal coin and medal collection of 1,623 pieces was one of the original parts of the Teyler collection, but the viewing of the coins was only possible when 2 directors of Teylers Stichting were available to unlock the collection. Besides Pieter Teyler's original collection, the Teyler's had acquired collections of 675 coins from West-Friesland and 2,395 coins of Gelderland.

== Coin and medal room ==
List of prominent objects in the coin and medal room:

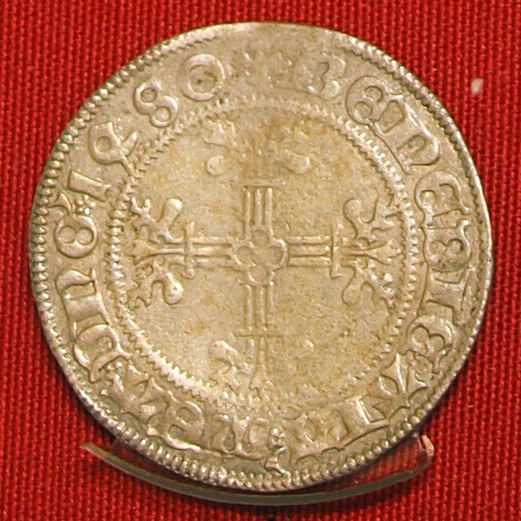
Coin from Gelre, 1480

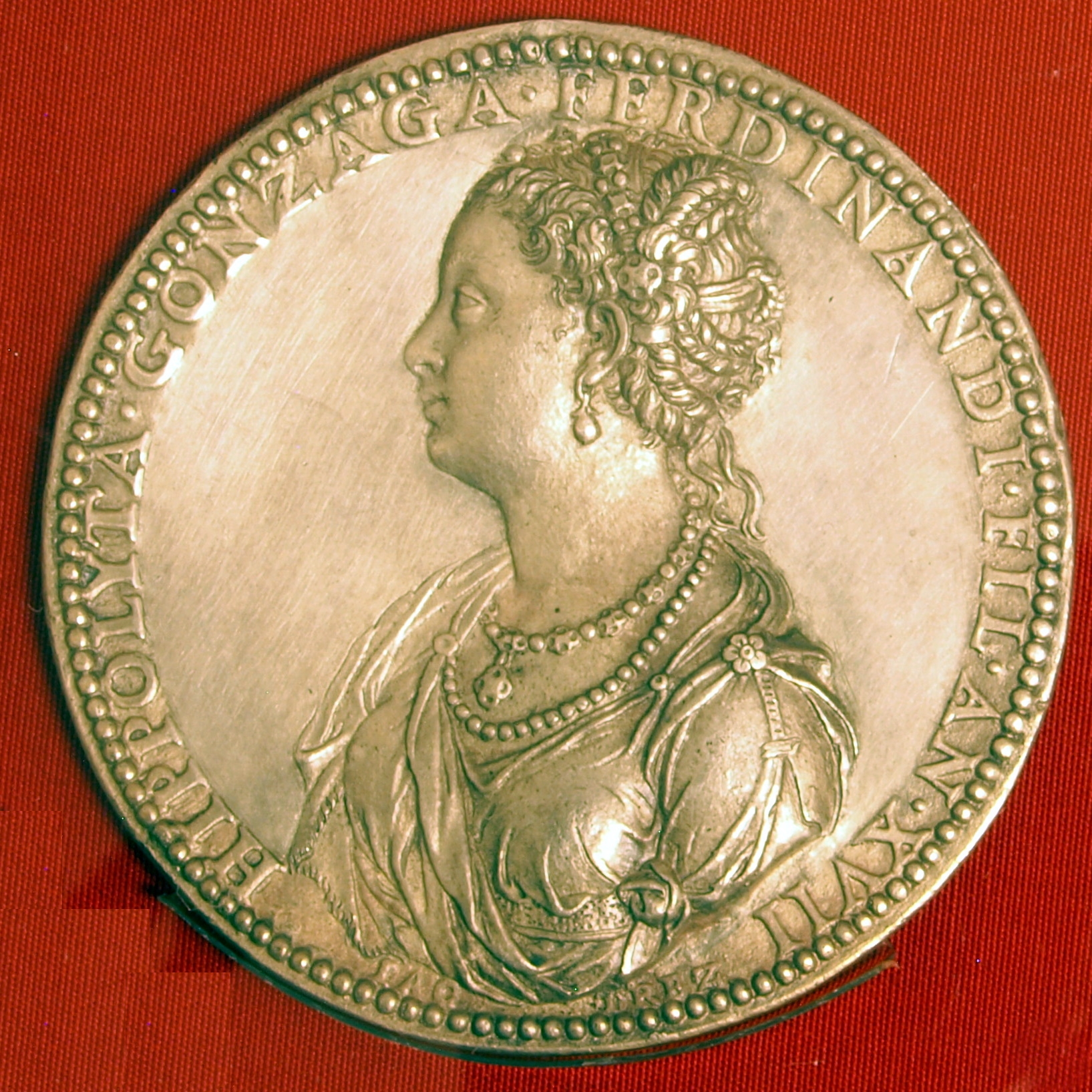
Hypolita Gonzaga, 1548, by Jacopo da Trezzo

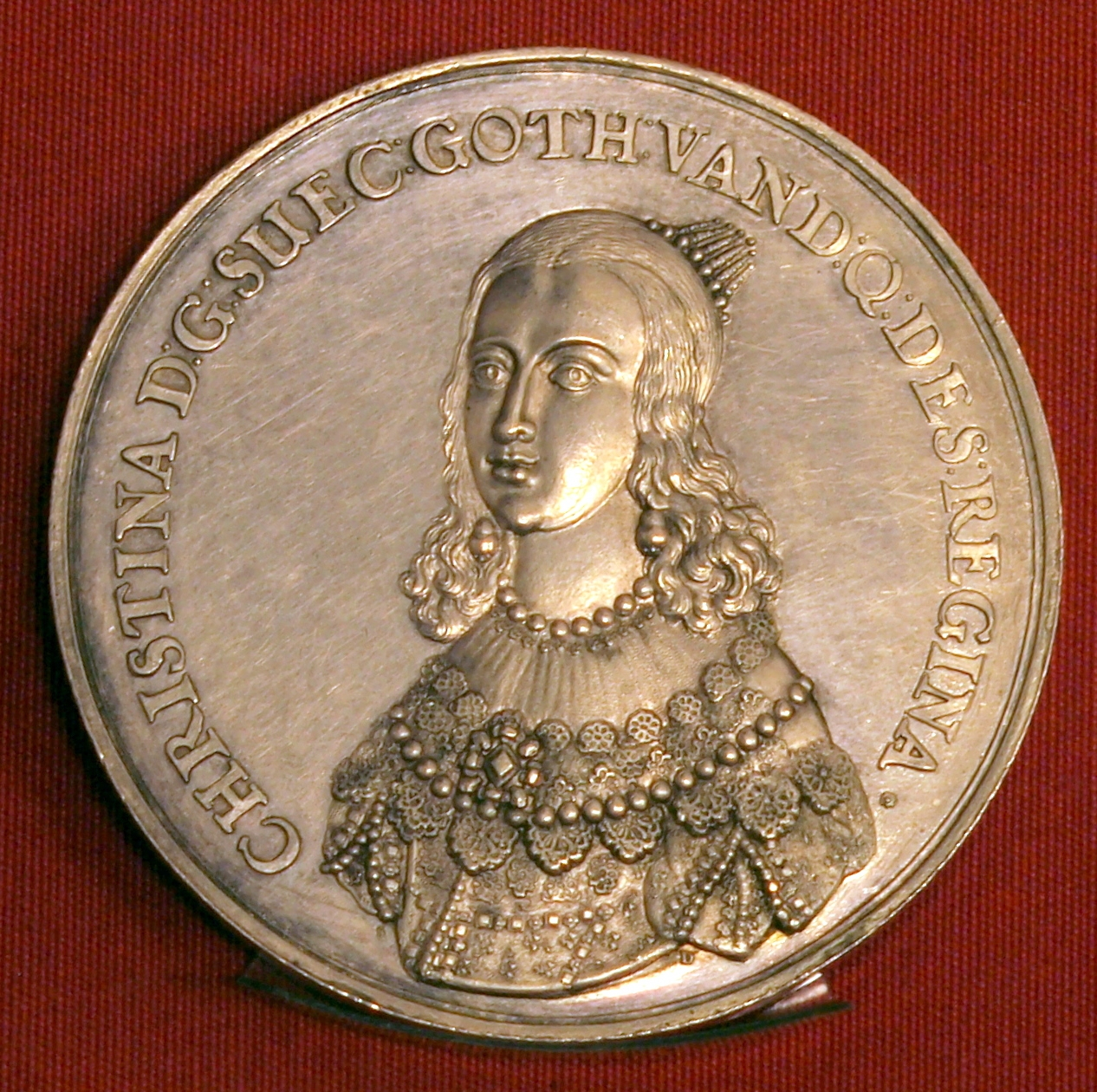
Queen Christina of Sweden, 1632, designed by Sebastian Dadler

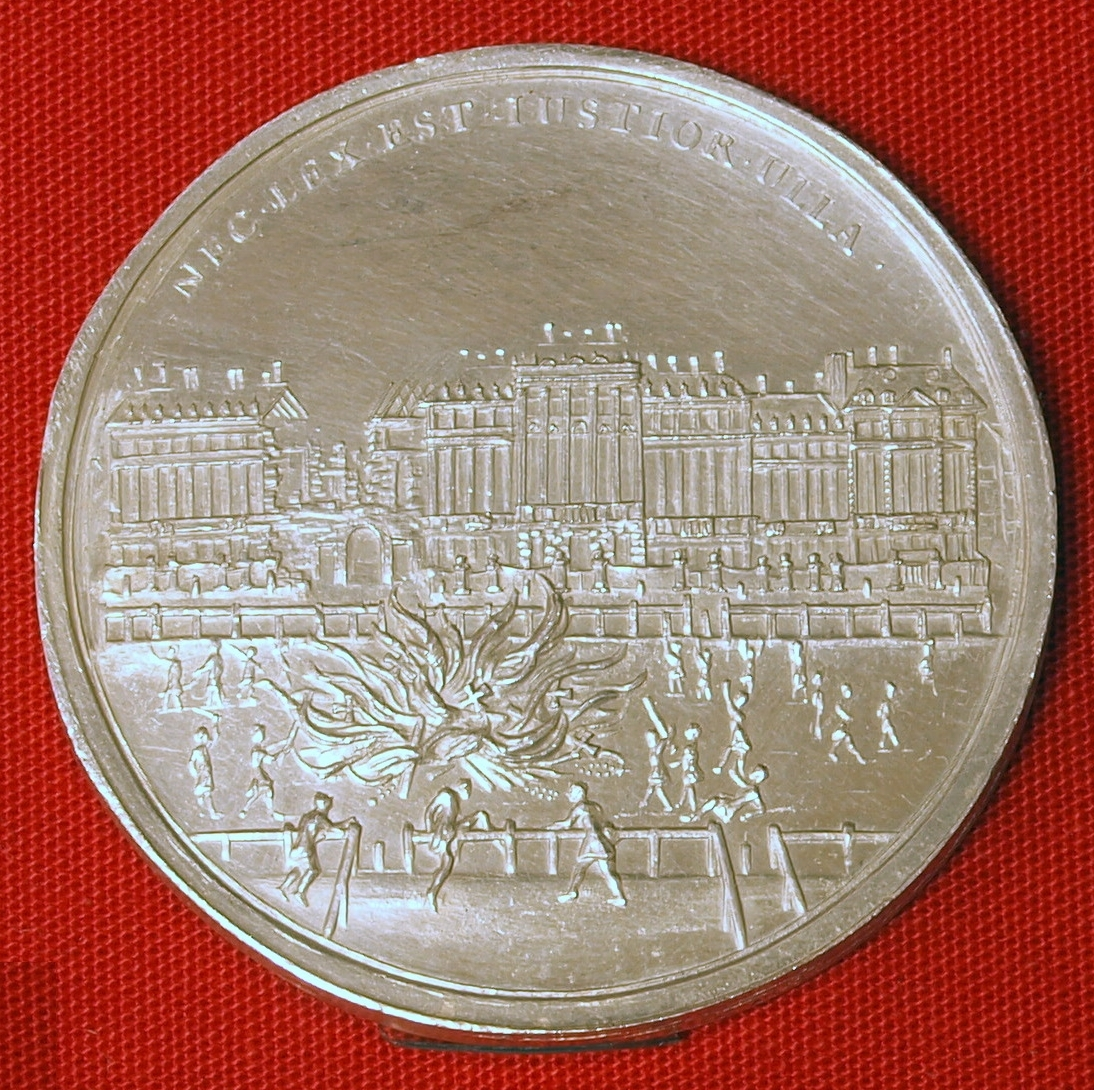
Looting of Catholic chapels in London, 11 December 1688, by Nicolas Chevalier

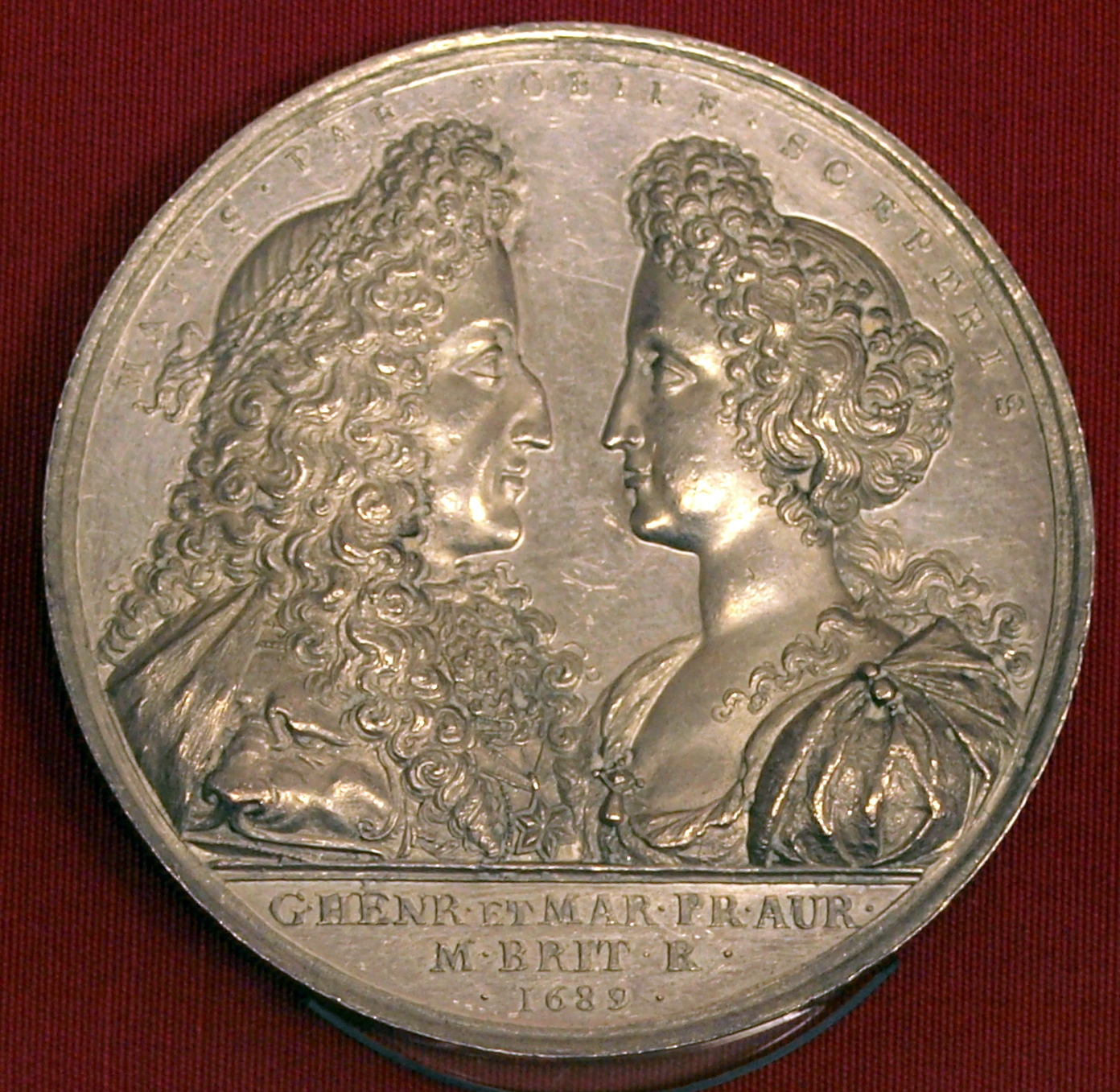
William and Mary, 1689

In 1888 on the advice of Adriaan Justus Enschedé, a numismatic curator was appointed to oversee the collection, and the first appointment was given to Theodorus Marinus Roest.
