= Theodorus Marinus Roest =

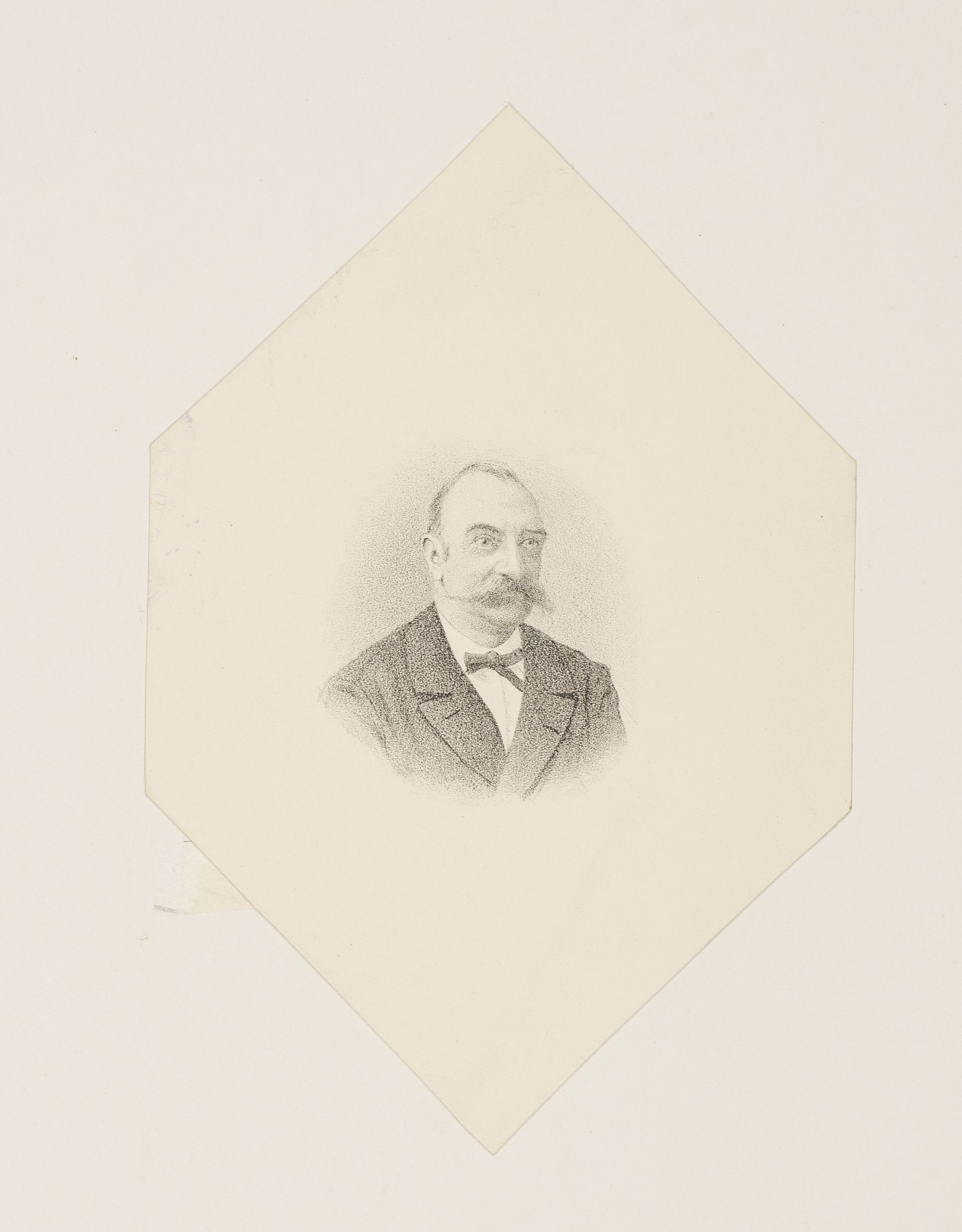
Th.M. Roest

Theodorus Marinus Roest (14 April 1832, Dongen – 2 September 1898 Baden-Baden) was a Dutch numismatist and conservator of the numismatic collection of the Teylers Museum.

In 1872 he was appointed associé étranger of the Sociéte royale de numismatique, and became publisher of Reveu de la numismatique belge. He became an authority on numismatics. In 1876 he became director of the Academisch Penningkabinet in Leiden. In 1881 he resigned when that cabinet was absorbed into the Royal cabinet of medals (which today is part of the nl:Geldmuseum in Utrecht).

Through the efforts of the archivist of the city of Haarlem Adriaan Justus Enschedé, Roest was hired to catalog the collection of the Teylers Museum. Enschedé had been a member of Teylers Tweede Genootschap since 1876 and was a coin collector himself. In 1886 Roest was named conservator, and in 1889 he published his "Catalogue du cabinet numismatique de la Fondation Teyler à Harlem".

In 1893 he published the work "De munten van het Graafschap en Hertogdom GELRE" (Coins of Gelre, or the Gelderse Mint), and later he left his collection of Gelderse coins to the museum.

In 1892 Roest was the founder and first chairman of the coin society Koninklijk Nederlands Genootschap voor Munt- en Penningkunde.
