= Willem Anne Lestevenon =

Dutch politician and art collecto

Willem Anne Lestevenon van Berkenrode (born in Paris on 14 October 1750 and died at La Ferté-Gaucher on 4 October 1830) was a Dutch politician and art collector.

== Biography ==
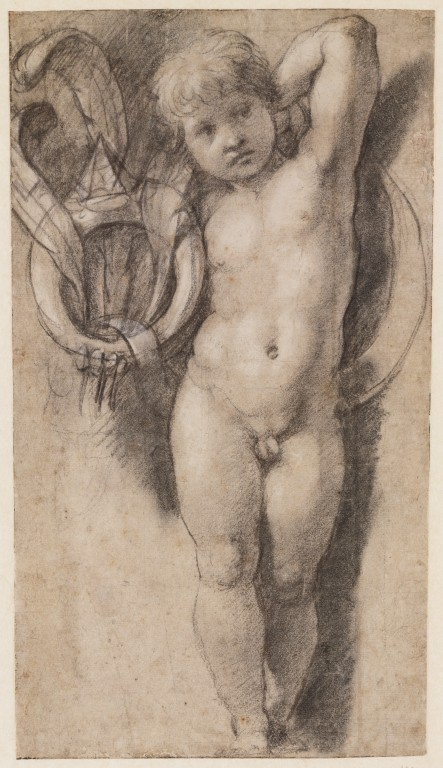
Putto carrying the Medici ring and feathers, by Raphael (1512-14). One of the 1700 drawings acquired by Lestevenon for Teylers Museum in Rome in 1790.

Willem Anne Lestevenon was born in Paris, where his father, Mattheus Lestevenon, was an ambassador of the United Provinces to the King of France. In 1760 he was sent to Leiden to study law. Upon graduation in 1768 he became bailiff of the town and Barony of Breda. Ten years later, he moved to Haarlem and was appointed to the city's vroedschap and joined the Teylers Second Society (1780), where he supported Martinus van Marum's utilitarian approach of the natural sciences as he expected these sciences to be fundamental for the recovery of Haarlem's textile industry. Lestevenon was sent to the States from Holland in 1783 and then to the States General of the United Provinces in the following year.

In July 1785, the States designated him on a special mission to Marie-Christine von Habsburg-Lorraine, governor of the Austrian Netherlands to solve the problems which had started with the Kettle War, resulting in the Treaty of Fontainebleau (1785).

Lestevenon was an ardent supporter of the Batavian patriots, leading William V of Orange to the sack. In February 1788 Lestevenon lost all his functions and traveled to Rome, where he bought a collection of mainly Italian drawings by masters like Michelangelo, Raphael, Guercino, Salvator Rosa, Claude Lorrain and Hendrick Goltzius, formerly owned by Livio Odescalchi and Christina I of Sweden, now in the Teylers Museum (1700 drawings), the Louvre, the British Museum and the MET.

When the Batavian Revolution broke out in January 1795 and William V fled to England, Lestevenon purged the municipality of the city to replace the Orangemen with patriots.

Considered one of the ablest diplomats of the country, he was one of the Batavian representatives to negotiate with Emmanuel Joseph Sieyès and Jean-François Reubell the Treaty of The Hague (1795), signed May 16.

On 27 January 1796 he was elected to the First National Assembly and served on the Foreign Relations Committee. On 18 June he was sent to Paris to represent the Batavian Republic in negotiations between Spain and France, resulting in the Second Treaty of San Ildefonso.

In 1797 he was embroiled in a sex scandal and, in absence, banned from the country. Lestevenon lost all his functions, sold Berkenrode and settled in France.
