= Johann Georg Holtzhey =

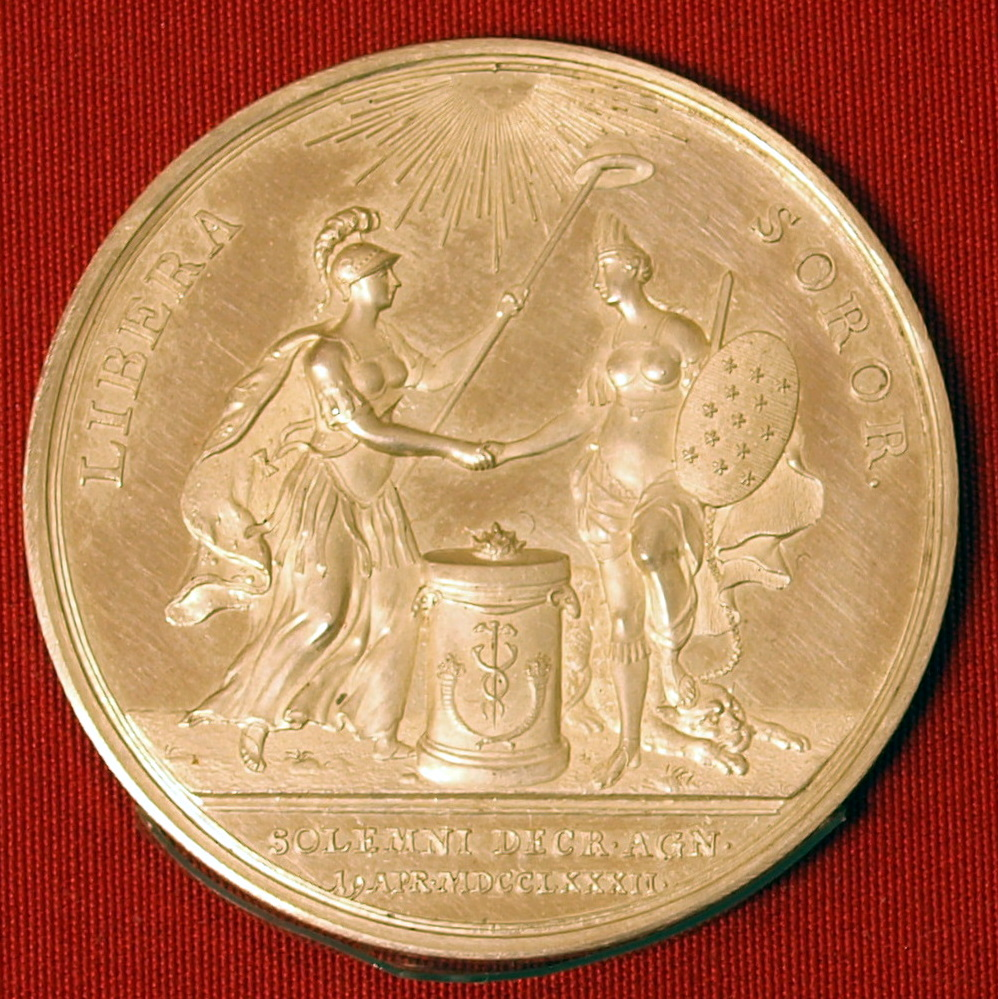
Medal struck for John Adams in 1782 to celebrate recognition of the United States as an independent nation by the Netherlands.

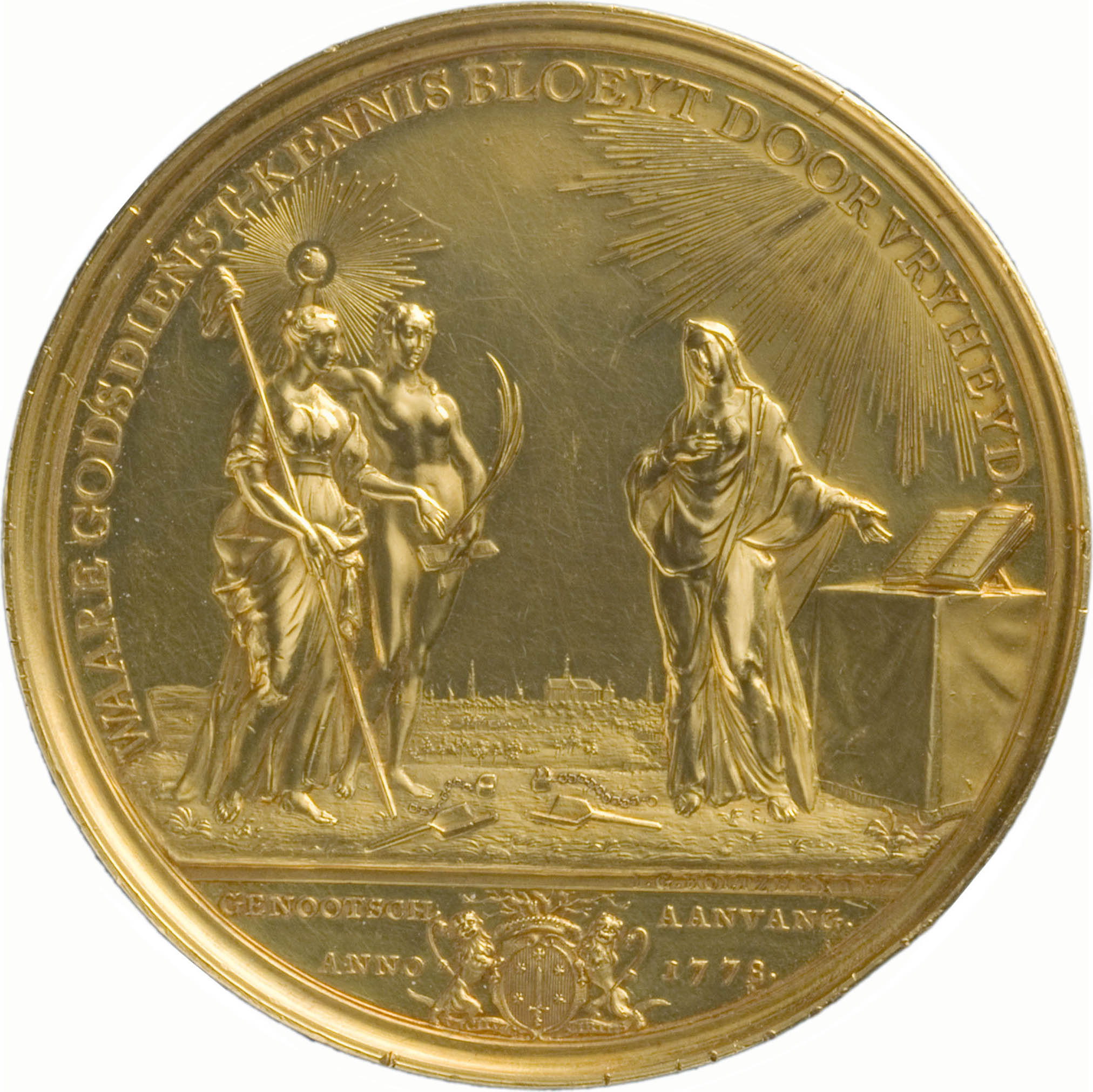
Prize medal awarded in 1784 by Teylers First Society to William Laurence Brown. The design was made in 1778 and Holtzhey struck the medals for all winners. After his death, the steel dies were bought by the Teylers Stichting and Teylers still has the prize medals produced in the same way.

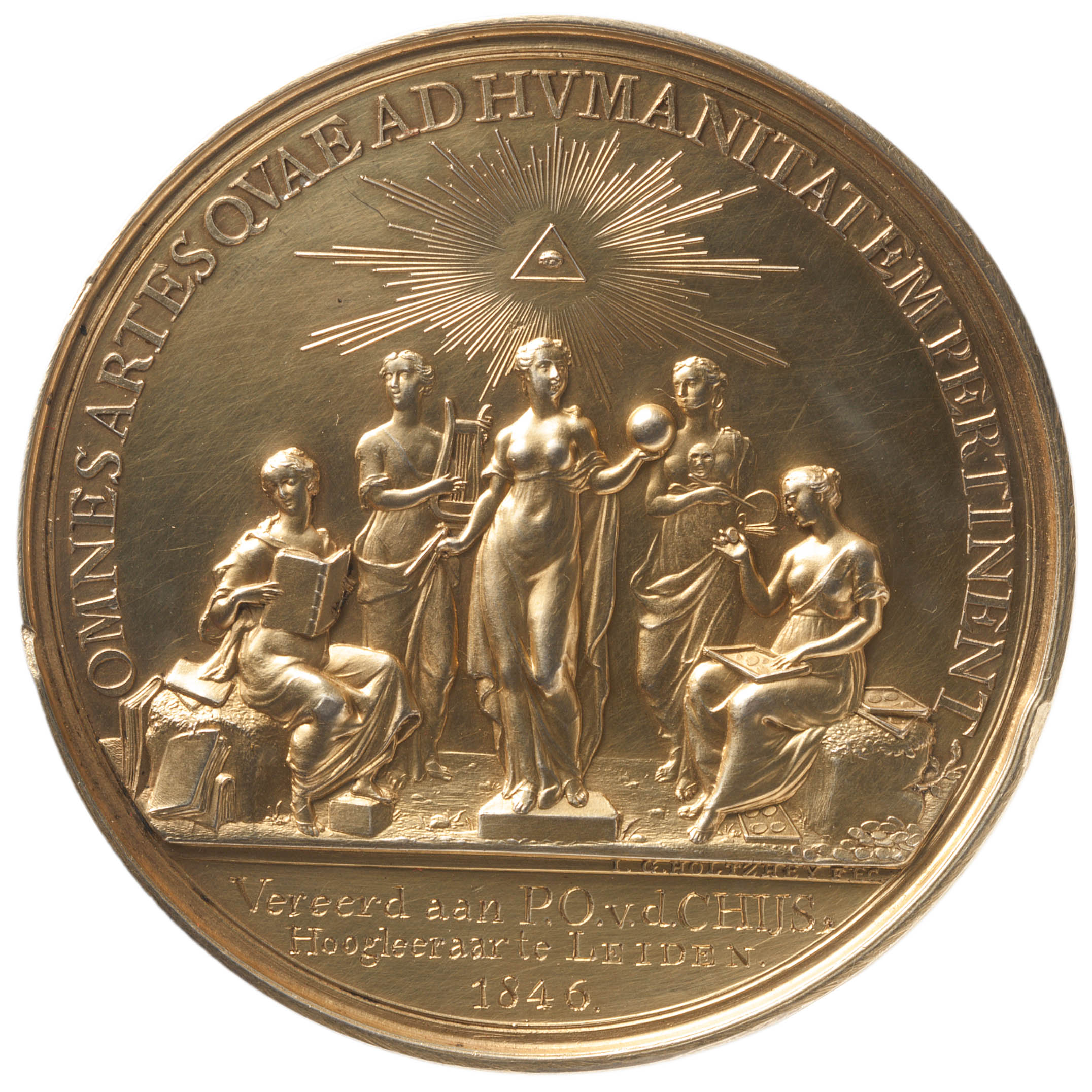
Prize medal awarded in 1846 by Teylers Second Society to Pieter Otto van der Chijs in 1846.

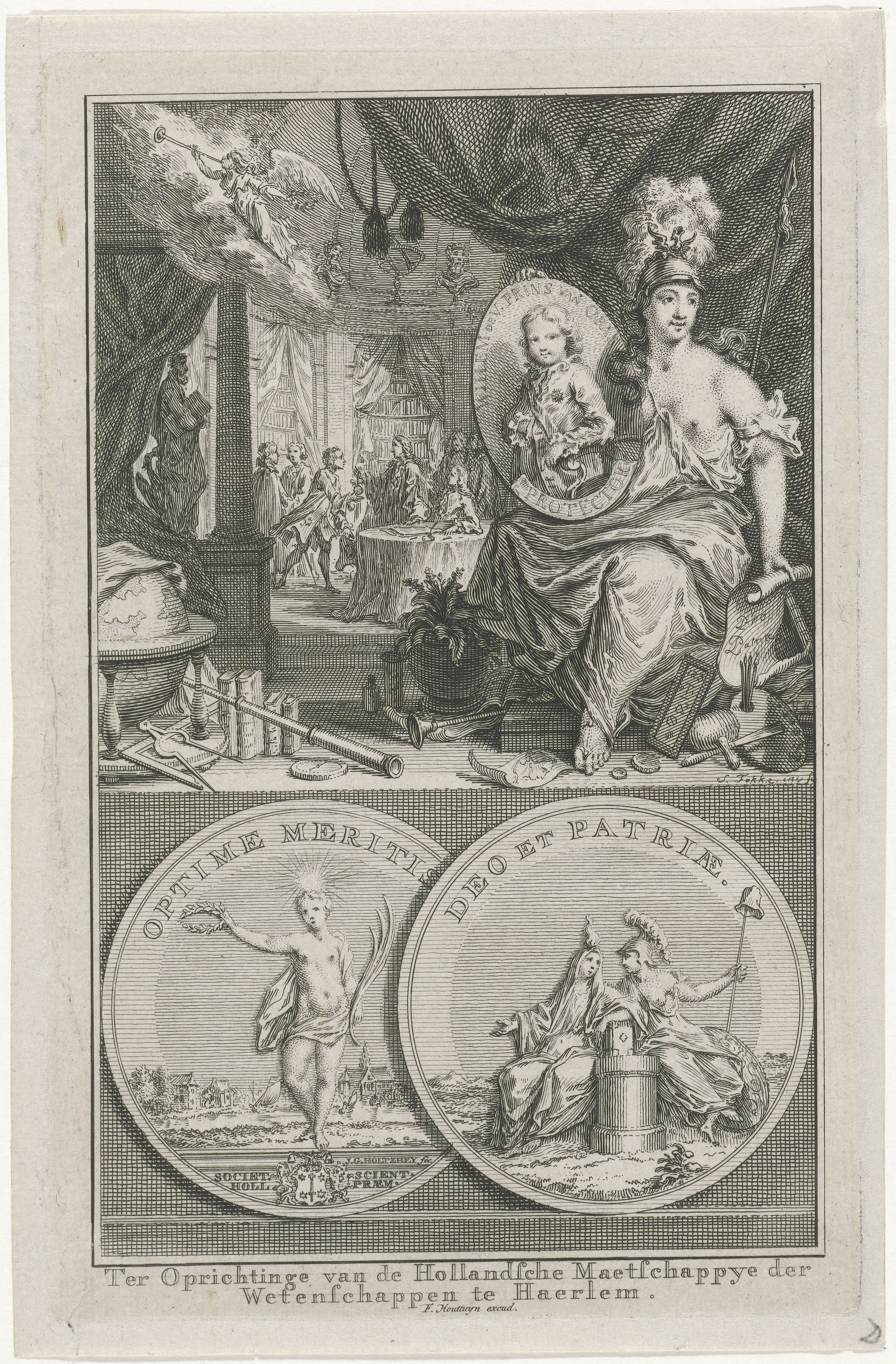
Commemorative print to celebrate the founding of the Dutch Society of Science in 1752, featuring the prize medal Holtzhey designed for them; engraving by Simon Fokke

Joan George (christened Johann George) Holtzhey (14 August 1726, Amsterdam – 20 February 1808, Amsterdam), was an 18th-century medallist and mint master from the Dutch Republic.

== Biography ==
According to the Netherlands Institute for Art History (RKD) he was the son of Martin Holtzhey, master of the mint in Gelderland and Middelburg. He took over his father's workshop in Amsterdam in 1749 when his father accepted his duties as "muntmeester" (mint master). He became mint master of the Utrecht mint, and became the teacher of the medallists David van der Kellen and Hendrik Lageman.

== Work for Dutch honorary societies: Teylers Stichting ==
He made a name for himself designing and striking medals for Dutch honorary societies, and kept the medal dies for these societies, striking medals on request and engraving the names of the prize winners himself. On his death the dies were often purchased back at great expense by the societies. The Teylers Stichting (English: Teylers Foundation) had him design a prize medal in 1778 that is still used. At 1000 guilders the manufacture of the steel dies on which the medals were struck was costly -a consequence of the size of the medals, which matched the ambitions of the new Foundation. Another receipt in the archive of Teylers Stichting testifies to the great care Holtzhey took when sending the medals, which were securely packed in wool to protect them from shaking. After Holtzhey's death the Foundation purchased the dies for the Teylers prize medal from the Holtzhey estate for 100 guilders.

== Work for John Adams ==
In 1782 Holtzhey designed two medals for John Adams, one to celebrate the Dutch acknowledgement of the independence of the Thirteen Colonies on April 19, 1782, and one to celebrate the trade treaty with the Netherlands on October 8, 1782. The face of the medal celebrating independence is in the collection of the Teylers Museum and declares “Libera Soror,” or “A Free Sister,” and depicts the Netherlands Maiden on the left as an armed woman and the United States on the right as a Native American woman. Holland uses a staff to place a Phrygian cap upon America's head, while America holds a shield bearing thirteen stars and rests a foot upon the head of a chained lion (representing England). The reverse shows the unicorn of the Royal coat of arms of the United Kingdom, prostrate with its horn broken against a rock cliff. The inscription reads, “Tyrannis virtute repulsa / sub Galliae auspiciis,” which translates to “Tyranny repelled by valor / under the auspices of France”,

Though Adams wrote ironically to his wife Abigail of the Dutch love for medals as a method of celebrating events, he wrote very respectfully to Holtzhey himself and thanked him for his work and explanation of the designs.

== Legacy ==
Together with his father Holtzhey wrote a catalog of 73 historical medals in 1755, Catalogus der Medailles en Gedenkpenningen, betrekking hebbende op de voornaamste historien der vereenigde Nederlanden, Amst. 1755, which was sadly far from complete, though it was quoted in several books on medals. Though he married twice he remained childless, and he was succeeded as mint master in Utrecht by his pupil David van der Kellen Sr., who continued his tradition of striking historical medals for anniversaries and popular events. In 1809 his collection was sold at auction for 4000 guilders.

== External sources ==
- G. van der Meer, 'Prijspenningen van Nederlandsche geleerde genootschappen in de achttiende eeuw', Werkgroep Achttiende Eeuw (1983), p. 1-20 in the DBNL
- website of Teylers Museum on Holtzhey's prize medals designed for the Teylers Stichting.
- website of Teylers Museum on Holtzhey's accounts paid by the stichting in the museum's archive.
