= Gerrit Willem van Oosten de Bruyn =

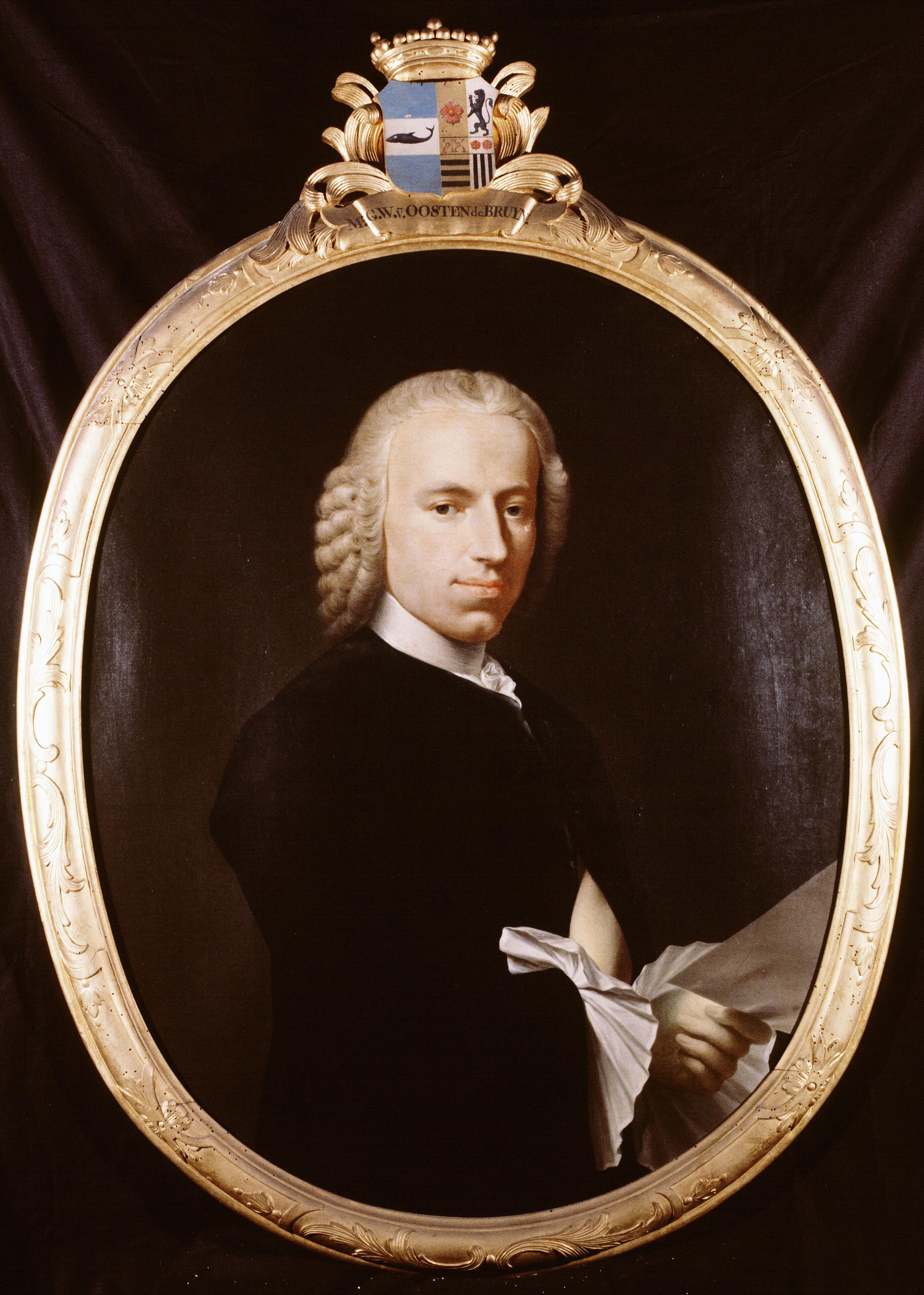
Oosten de Bruyn's portrait was painted by Tako Hajo Jelgersma for the Hofje van Noblet in 1764

Gerrit Willem van Oosten de Bruyn (17 October 1727 – 16 July 1797) was an 18th-century lawyer from the Dutch Republic.

== Biography ==
He was born in Amersfoort. After he studied law in Utrecht he moved to Haarlem, where he joined several societies and consorted with Pieter Teyler van der Hulst, who appointed him in his testament as a member of Teylers Tweede Genootschap. He was an Orangist and during the Orangist uprising he became mayor of Haarlem in 1789 and 1790, but was ousted from the council in 1795 during the French occupation. He published an update of Samuel Ampzing's History of Haarlem and was a regent of the Hofje van Noblet. He had a summer house in Amersfoort called Randenbroek, which is where he died.

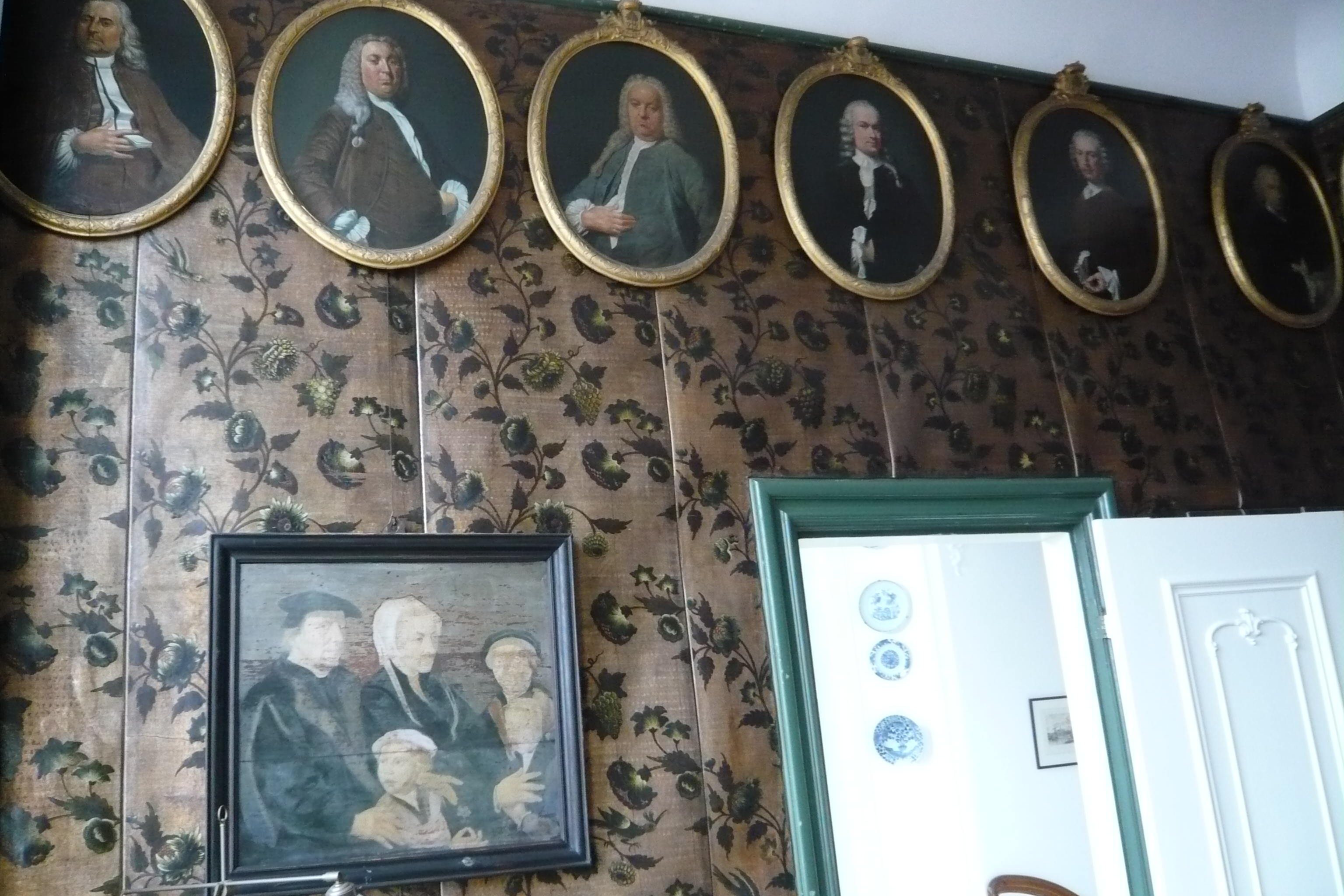
Oosten de Bruyn's portrait, painted on his appointment as regent, hangs in the upper right corner of the regent's room in the Hofje van Noblet

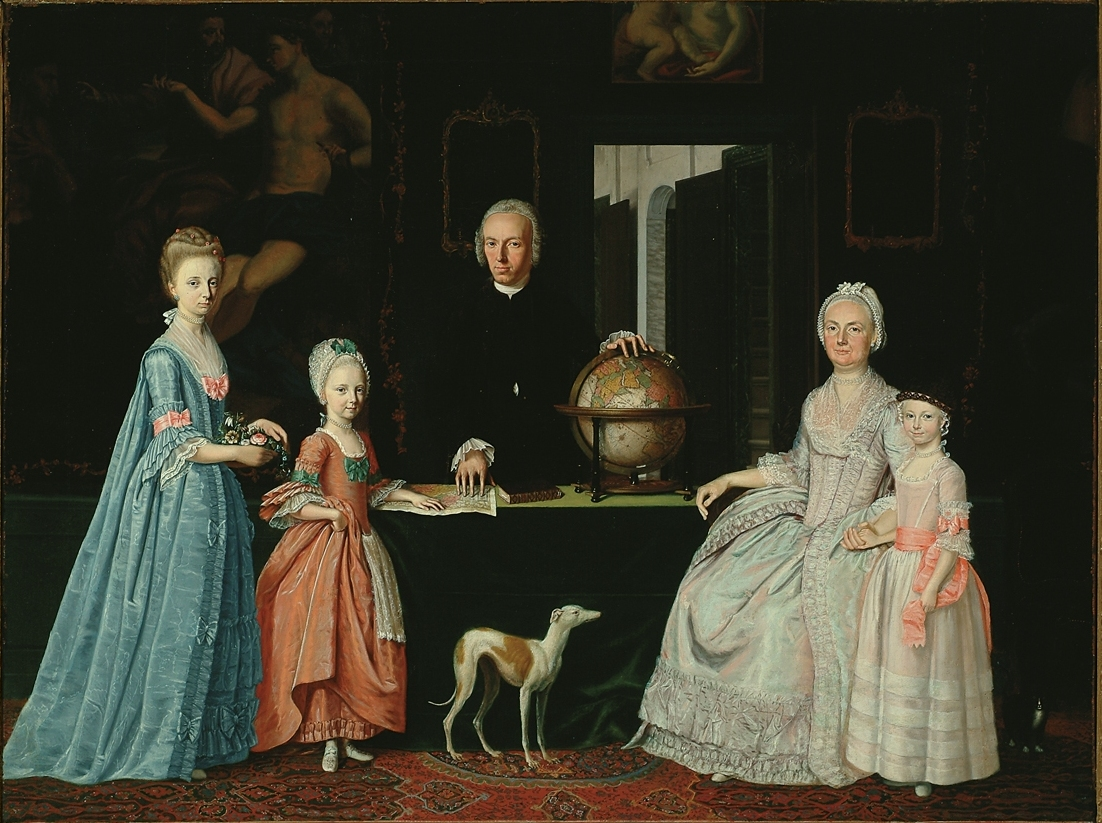
10 years later in 1774 he commissioned a family portrait by Jordanus Hoorn, collection Frans Hals Museum
