= Van Eynden family =

Roeland van Eynden (Dutch: [vɑn ˈɛində(n)]) was a Dutch painter. He was born at Nymegen in 1747, and died at Dordrecht in 1819. Like his brother he devoted but a portion of his time to painting, and is principally known by his works on art and artists, of which the most important is the Geschiedenis der Vaderlandsche Schilderkunst, written in conjunction with Van der Willigen, and published in 1816–1842.

Jacobus van Eynden, also known as Jacobus II, the older brother of Roeland, born at Nymegen in 1733, studied art under his father, and painted principally watercolour pictures of flowers, fruit, animals, and views of towns. He, however, devoted a large portion of his time to science. He died at Nymegen in 1824.

Frans van Eynden, uncle of Roeland and Jacobus, born at Nymegen in 1694, studied under Elias van Nymegen at Rotterdam. Aided by the counsels of Chevalier Van der Werf, he painted Arcadian scenes, which he executed in the manner of Jan van Huysum, but not with equal perfection. His skies and distances are serene and delicate, and the clouds illumined by the sun are pleasingly reflected in the waters. His scenes are skilfully varied, and the different kinds of trees characterized with a neat and masterly touch; his figures also are well painted, and disposed with judgment. He seldom signed his pictures, unless required to do so by the purchaser. He died at Nymegen in 1742.
