= Pieter Otto van der Chijs =

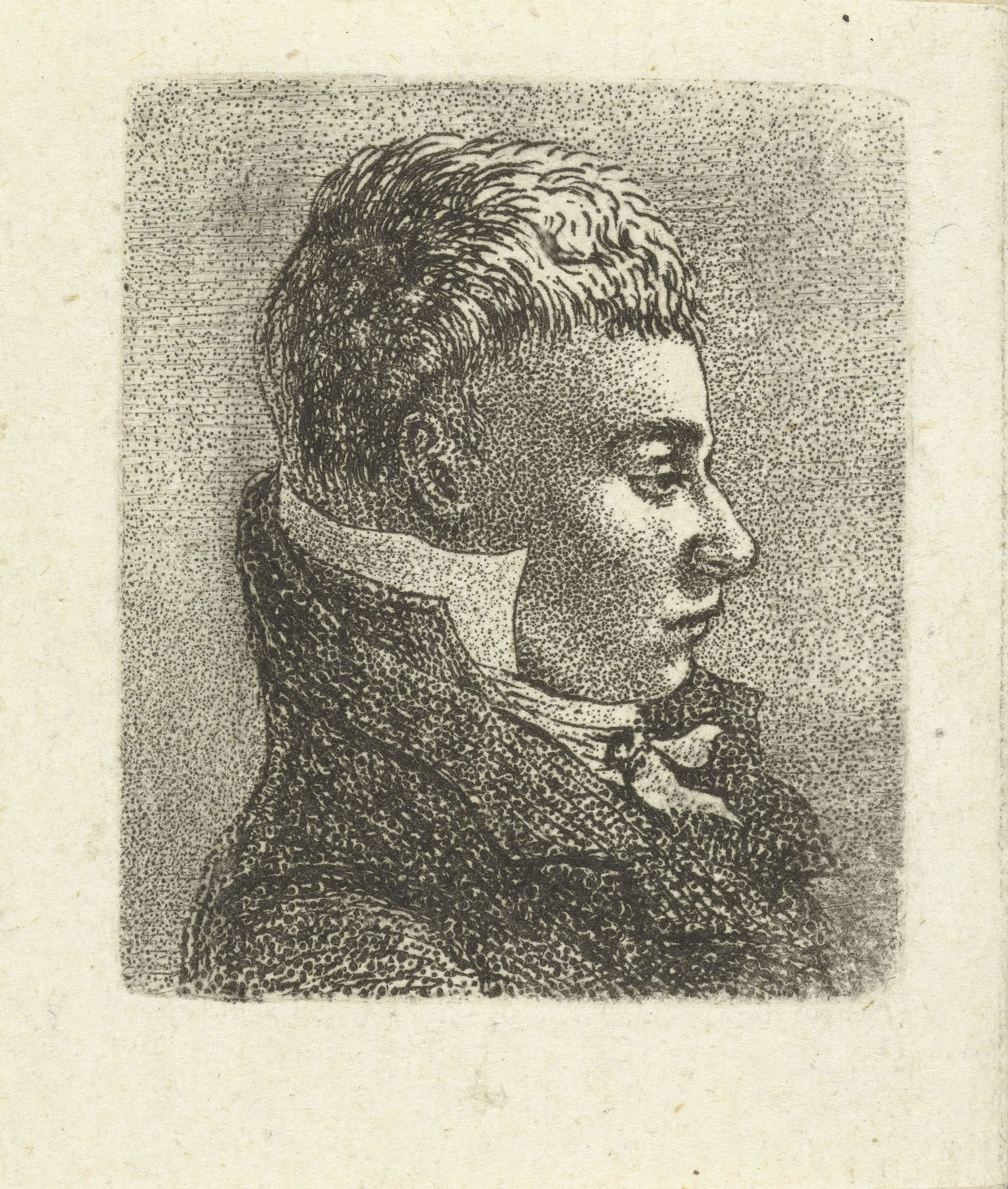
Pieter Otto van der Chijs

Pieter Otto van der Chijs (Delft, 11 August 1802 – Leiden, 4 November 1867) was a Dutch coin expert and one of the early prizewinners of Teylers Tweede Genootschap (Teylers Second or Scientific Society).

He was the son of J. van der Chijs and A.S. Bagelaar who encouraged him to start collecting. At the age of nine became interested in coins when he studied the ones his parents donated to the poor of Delft each week. He began to collect coins from around the world. After following school in Delft, he became a student of letters at the University of Leiden in 1820. He won a few prizes before devoting himself to his hobby. He wrote an essay on the art of collecting old coins in 1829 and in 1831 he became a member of the Batavian Society for Experimental Philosophy. In 1833 he started the coin magazine "Tijdschrift voor algemeene munt- en penningkunde". In 1835 he was appointed director with the honorary title of "Professor Extraordinarius" of the coin cabinet Penningkabinet der Hoogeschool in Leiden.

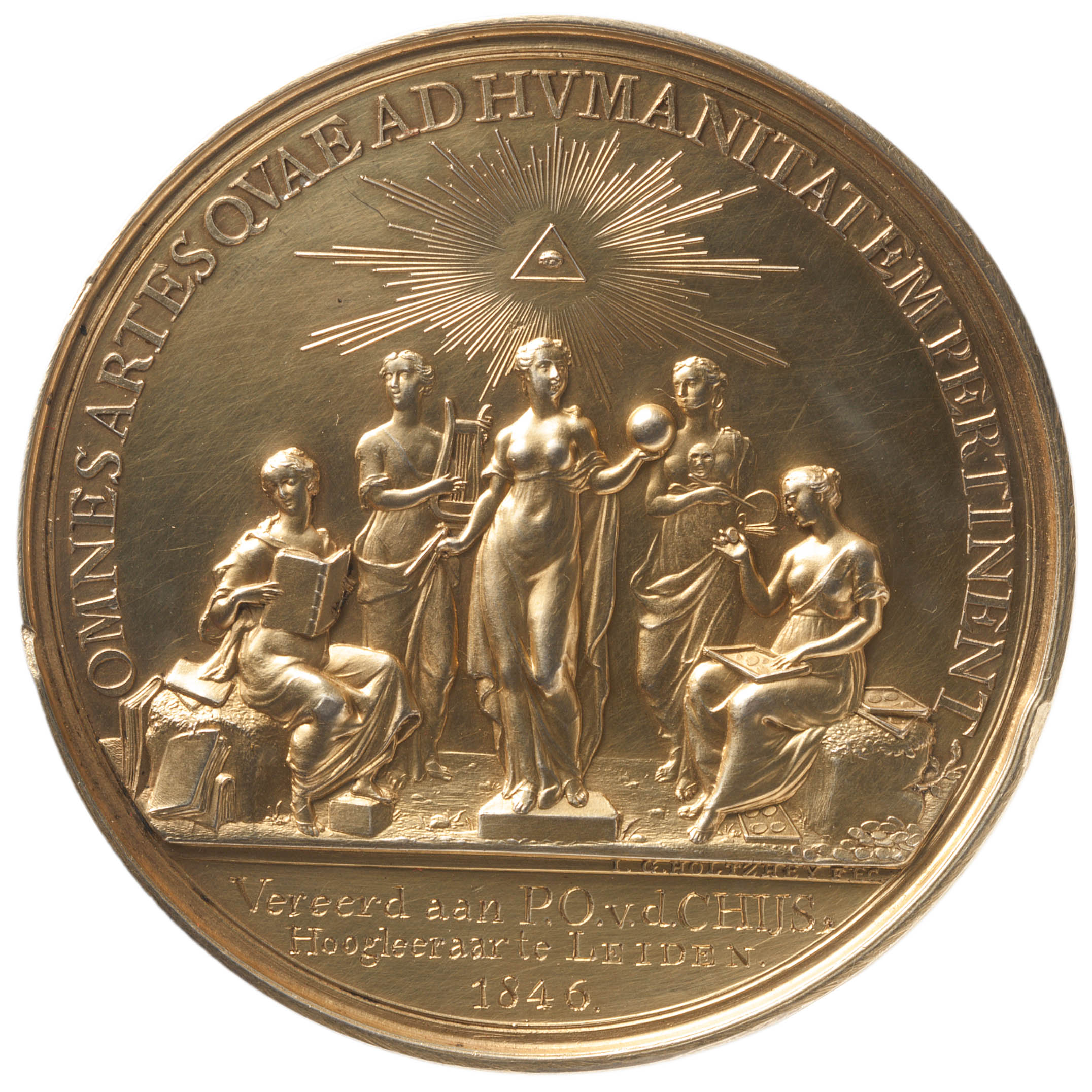
Silver prize medal of Teylers Second Society, awarded to Chijs in 1846.

The Teylers Second Society announced a prize in 1841 for 'a compilation of coins under former Dutch dukes, counts, lords and cities, from the earliest times up to 1576'. Chijs had already started work correcting the work of Cornelis van Alkemade who had published an incomplete list in 1700. This prize question could never be completed in the time allotted, but Chijs was granted a year's extension in 1844 and when he published his De munten der voormalige hertogdommmen Braband en Limburg, he was awarded a prize medal on 4 December 1846.

In 1862 he published his last work Notice sur le Cabinet Numismatique de l'Universite de Leyde, which was a catalogue of his cabinet.
