= Martin Holtzhey =

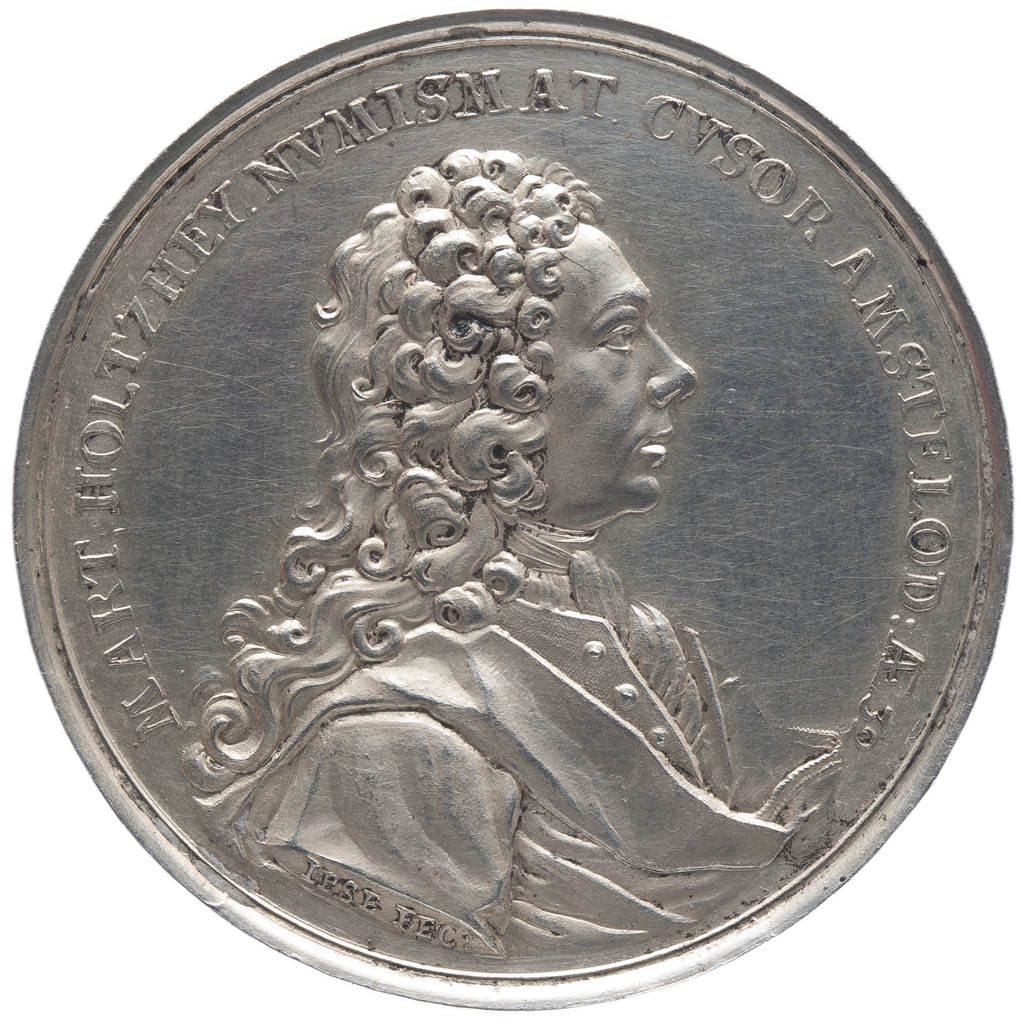
Portrait of the medallist Martin Holtzhey, obverse. Silver, 1729. Holtzhey produced this medal to advertise his work and name.

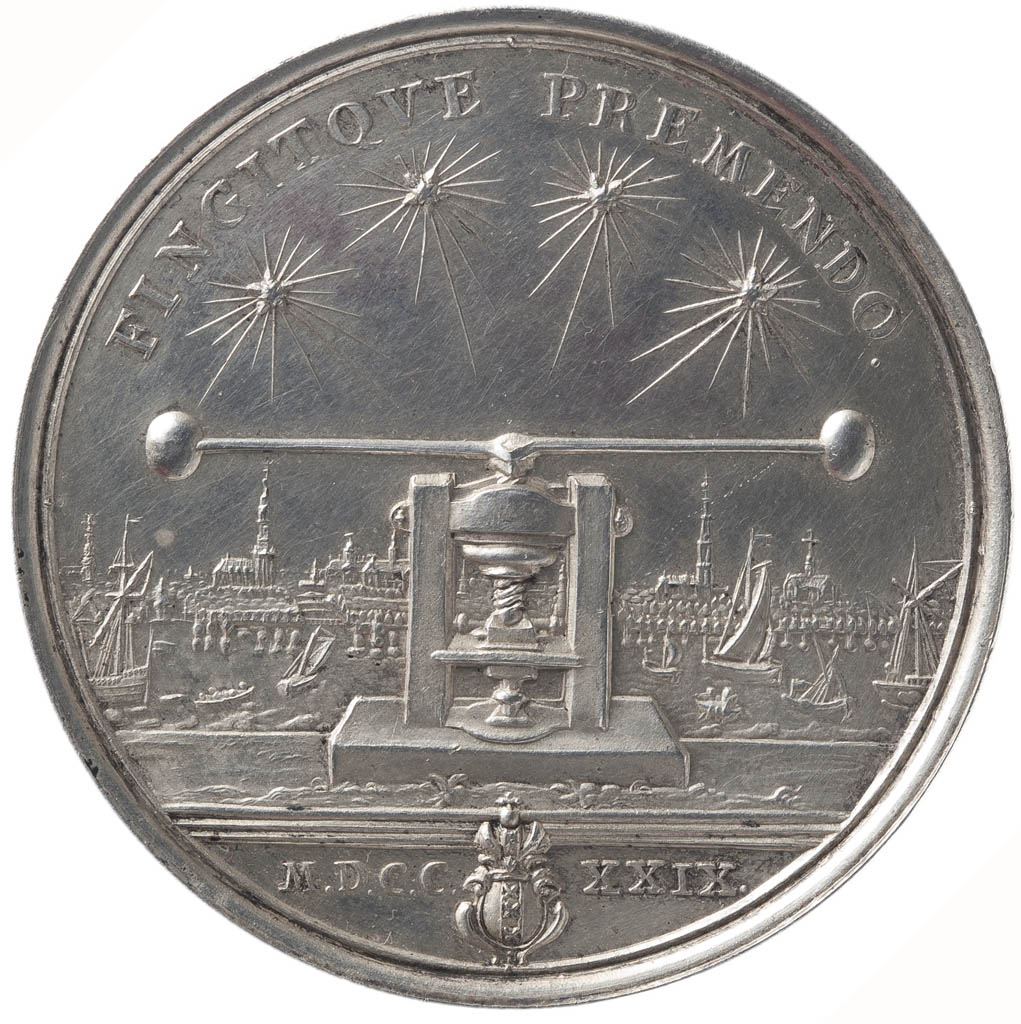
Portrait of the medallist Martin Holtzhey, reverse. Silver, 1729. View of the skyline of Amsterdam with Holtzhey's coin press.

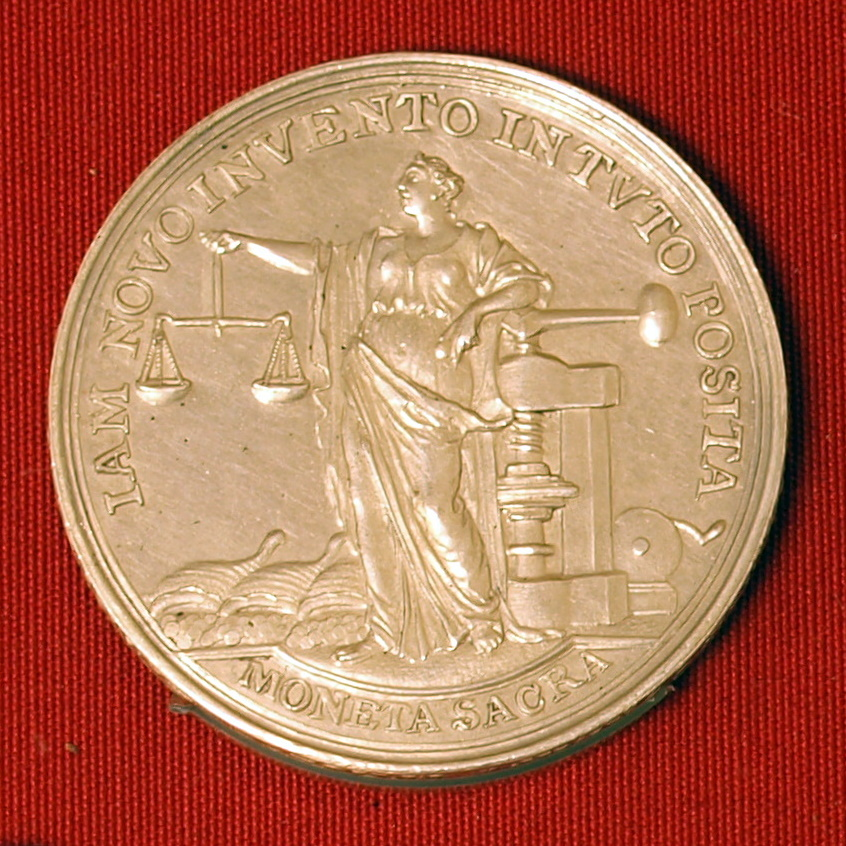
Allegorical depiction of Martinus Holtzhey as "muntmeester" of Gelderland, 1749

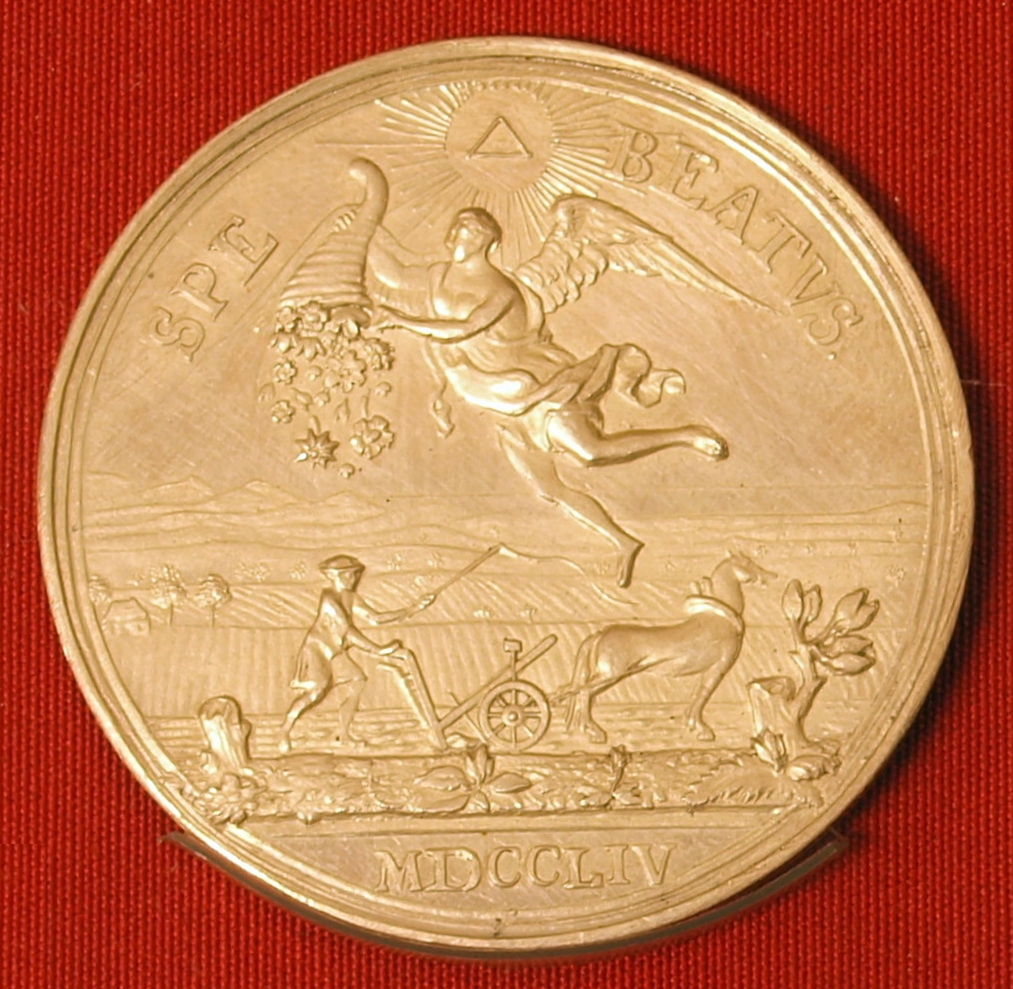
New year's medal, 1754

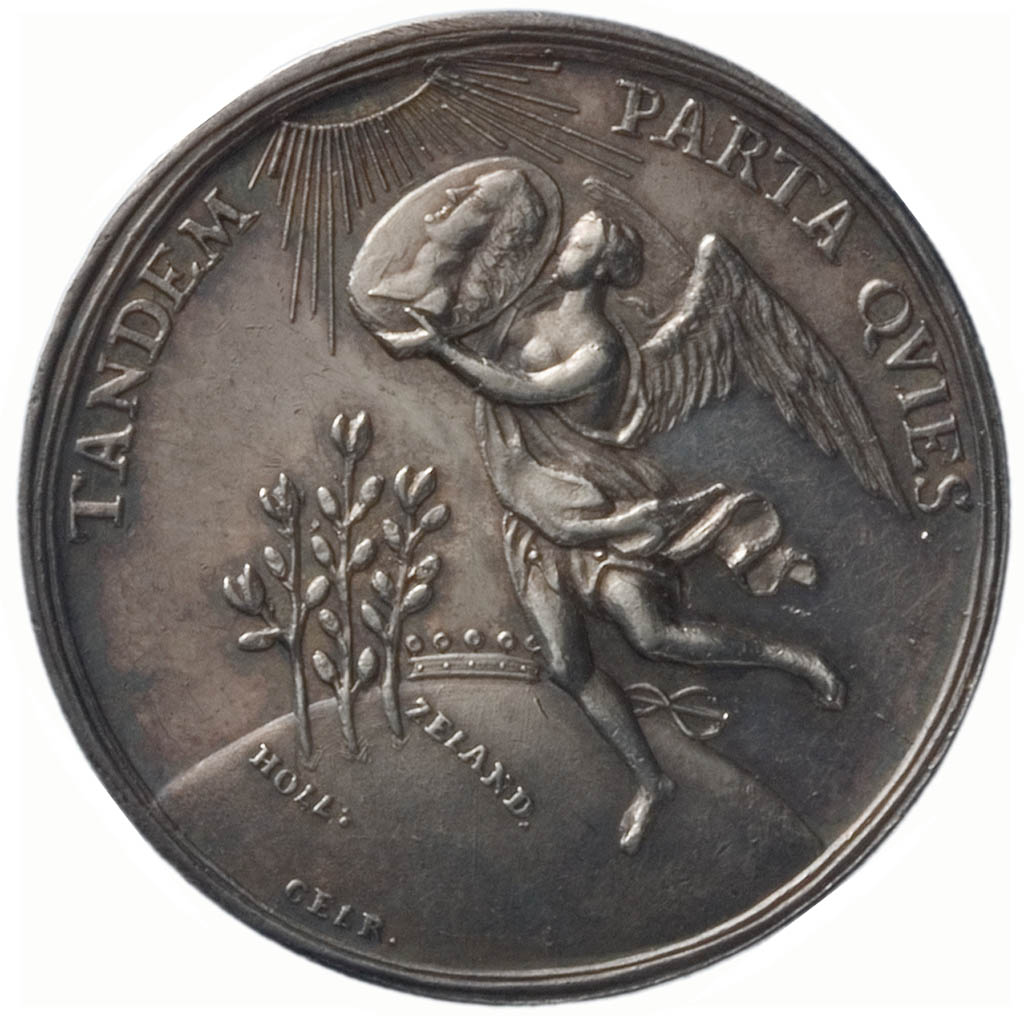
Commemorative medal for Martin Holtzhey. Silver, 1764. An angel is depicted carrying the portrait of Martin Holtzhey up to heaven. On the globe the three provinces in which Holthey has lived and worked are indicated (Holland, Gelderland, Zeeland). The three plants represent his three children. The inscription reads Tandem parta Quies : He has finally found peace.

Martin Holtzhey (1697, in Ulm – 1764, in Middelburg), was an 18th-century German medallist and mint master, active in the Dutch Republic.

== Biography ==
He was the father of the medallist Johann Georg Holtzhey. He worked in the Hague, Amsterdam, Harderwijk and Middelburg. In 1722 he joined the Lutheran church of Amsterdam and he married there in 1725, the same year that he entered the silversmith's guild. The next year his son Johann Georg was born, and in 1636 his youngest son Martin Jr. was born. He started striking medals for special occasions and made a name for himself among collectors in this way, making medals for major events, to mark an anniversary, or simply to herald in a new year. Examples are his 1736 medal in honor of the 200th anniversary of Menno Simons leaving the Catholic faith, and his 1740 medal in celebration of the 300th anniversary of Laurens Janszoon Coster's discovery of moveable type. When Holtzhey struck such "historical medals", he often included a paper explaining the symbolism he used on them, a tradition that was continued later by his son Johann Georg. His medals were popular with wealthy followers of the enlightenment, such as Pieter Teyler van der Hulst. The medals in his collection are among the few items collected by Teyler himself that are still part of the inventory of Teylers Museum today, such as his 1736 medal struck for completing the Lutheran church of Rotterdam.

In 1749 he handed his Amsterdam workshop over to his son Johann Georg when he moved to Harderwijk to become mint master of Gelderland. He commemorated this with a medal in his own honor. In 1755 he commemorated himself again on the occasion of his 25th anniversary of striking historical medals. He published a catalog of them for his collectors, assisted by his son Johann Georg called Catalogus der medailles of gedenkpenningen betrekking hebbende op de voornaamste historien der Vereenigde Nederlanden.

== Story of the mysterious 'Zeeuwse duit' ==
In 1754 he became mint master of Zeeland in Middelburg. This is the same year that a strange penny piece was coined in Middelburg known as the "Ementor duit". It was possibly a joke played by Holtzhey's assistant, his son Martin jr. who assisted his father until he took over his position as mint master. The coat of arms of Zeeland include a lion half under water. The motto is 'Luctor et Emergo', or "I struggle and emerge". In the year 1754 the new duits were coined with 'Luctor et Ementor', or "I struggle and go under", which would imply the lion is drowning rather than emerging from the floods.

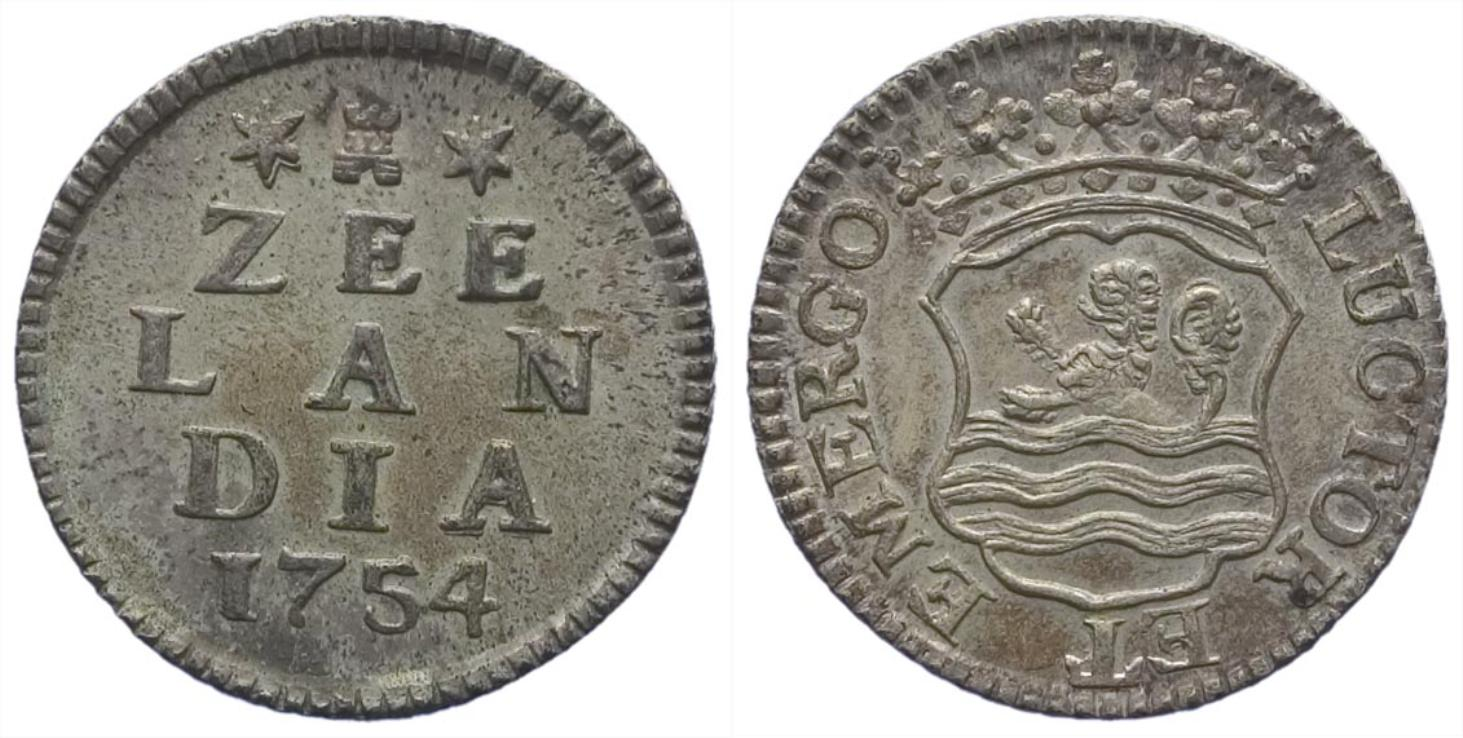
Luctor et Emergo

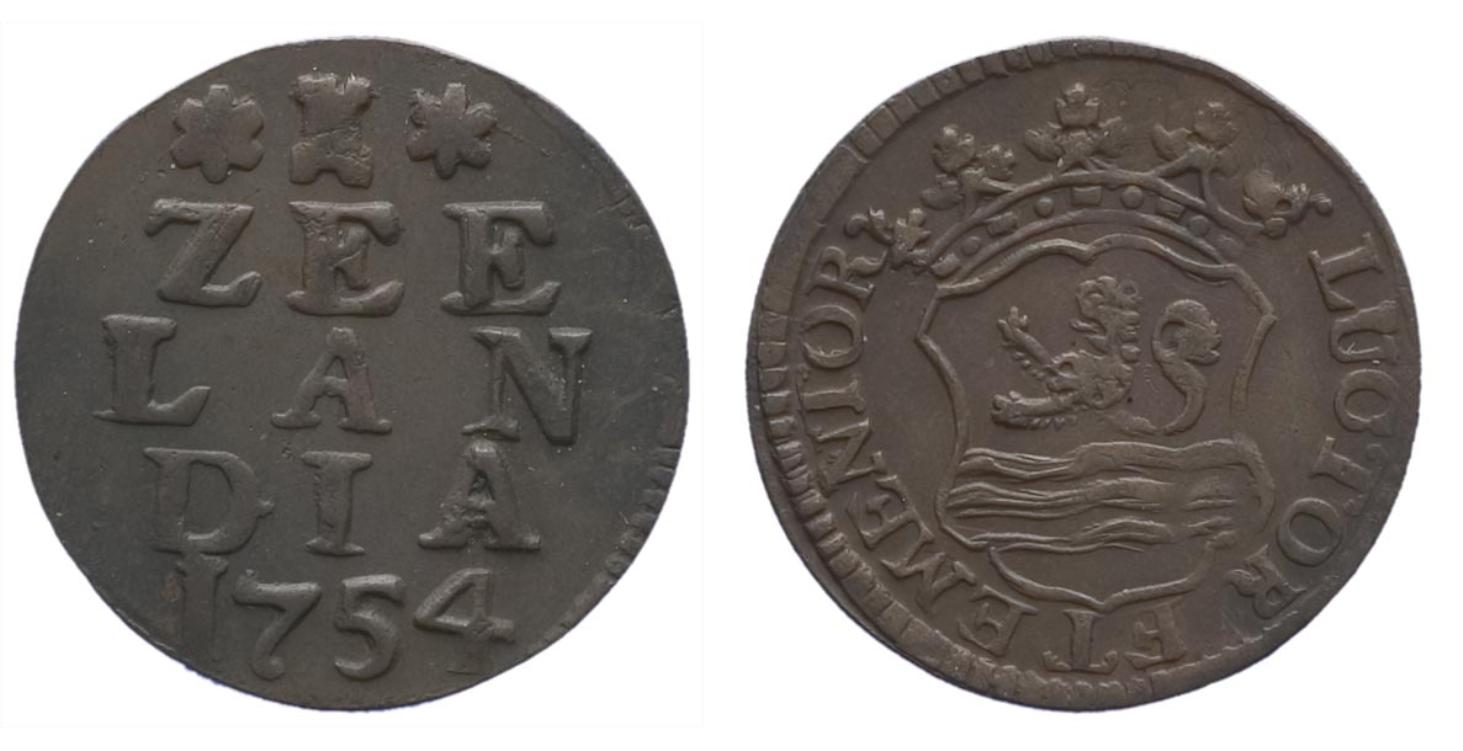
Luctor et Ementor

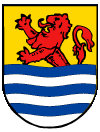
Coat of arms of Zeeland
