= Cornelis Elout =

Dutch regent and collector

Cornelis Elout (Haarlem, 11 March 1714 – Haarlem, 3 November 1779) was a Haarlem regent, collector, one of the first members of Teylers Tweede Genootschap (Teylers Second or Scientific Society) and regent of the Armekinderhuis ("poor children's home"). Cornelis was the son of Jacob Elout and his wife Eva Cornelis dochter Akersloot Steyn. Cornelis Elout was the father of Cornelis Pieter Elout, who was council member and "hoofdschout" of Haarlem and Heer van Schoten.

Upon his death, Cornelis left a significant collection of paintings and drawings behind.
