= Adriaan van der Willigen =

Dutch playwriter

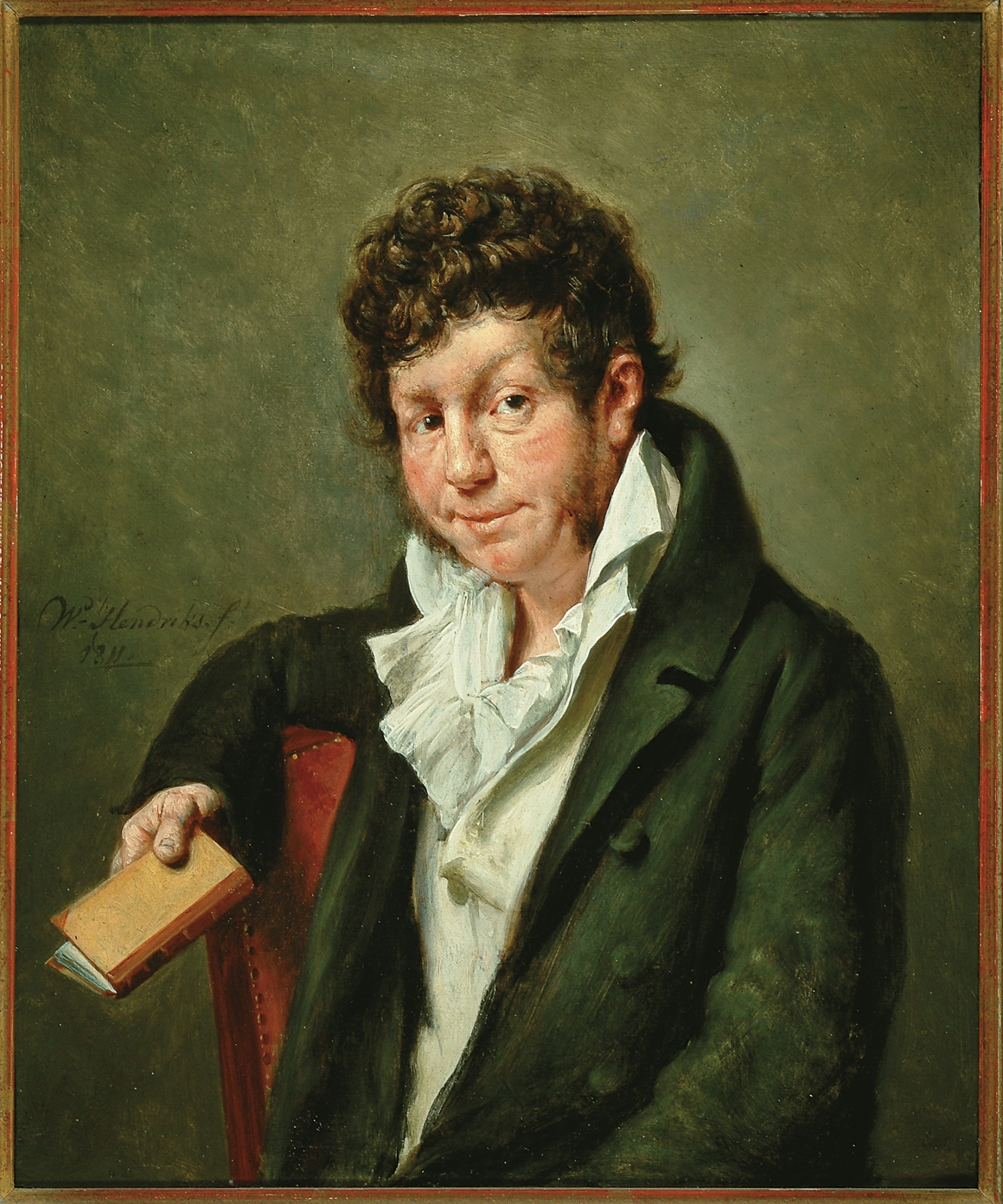
Adriaan van der Willigen by Wybrand Hendriks in 1811

Adriaan van der Willigen (1766, Rotterdam – 1841, Haarlem) was a Dutch writer of plays and travelogues who is mostly remembered today for his comprehensive list of painter biographies.

== Biography ==
He was born in Rotterdam, but six months later his mother died and he was raised by her sister in Haarlem, where he learned to draw and enjoyed literature and theater. He later moved back to Rotterdam at age 16 to live with his strict Calvinist father, who did not allow him to attend the theater, and where he was set to work as a clerk in a merchant's office. He became a follower of Jean-Jacques Rousseau and escaped his father's house a year and a half later in 1785 to join the Dutch Republican Army, and was stationed along the Waal (river) in Nijmegen, Grave, and Venlo. There he was free to pursue his literary and theatrical interests, but when he was sent in 1787 to Den Bosch to quell the plundering there, he was disgusted by plundering troops. This made him less and less royalist and more and more in sympathy with the patriots. He was eventually dismissed in 1789, because of his increasing sympathy for the patriot movement. He first moved to Oss where he tried his hand at farming with modern agricultural techniques, and three years after a trip to Belgium, he settled in Tilburg, where he became Drossaard (chief justice) in 1795. During the French occupation he became charged with the conscription of young men into the French army, and was embarrassed by requests from family and friends to protect their sons. He quit his position in 1802 and moved to Paris, where he became less and less enamored of the French patriots. In 1804 he made another long journey through France and in 1805 he travelled through Italy, Switzerland, and Germany on his way back to Haarlem, where he settled for good. He busied himself with his work on art, while continuing to plan trips, which he mostly made in the company of a friend or relative. Many of his travelogues were published. His writings show his political development, and illustrate how he went from being an Orangist to a Patriot, and then became an Orangist again. He felt strongly that Belgium and Holland belonged together and was heavily disappointed when Belgium seceded from the union in 1830.

According to the RKD he was an art theorist and draughtsman. He became correspondent of the Royal Institute of the Netherlands in 1816.

== Artist biographies ==
He is best known today for writing a comprehensive list of artist biographies of artists living in the Netherlands, together with the author Roeland van Eynden, called Geschiedenis der Vaderlandsche Schilderkunst. After he settled in Haarlem, Van der Willigen became a member of Teylers Tweede Genootschap and became friends with Van Eynden and the art curator of the collection there, Wybrand Hendriks, who painted his portrait. Van Eynden was also a member of the society and had won a gold medal in the category 'Drawing and Painting' in 1781 on The National taste in drawing and painting. He was already working on the first book of the two volume set of painter biographies, which included painters not earlier mentioned in Karel van Mander, Arnold Houbraken, or Johan van Gool. Van der Willigen promptly entered the next Teylers Tweede Genootschap competition and won a gold medal in the same category in 1806 together with Pieter Kikkert, for their contribution on the Reasons for the small number of Dutch history painters. Van der Willigen proceeded to collaborate with Van der Eynden on his book and contributed the painters from the middle of the eighteenth century up to his own time. There are over 1500 artists and collectors listed in the work.

== Archival importance of his diary and travelogues ==
Five of his autobiographical travelogues and diaries were compiled into an autobiography in 2010 by the city archivaris of North Brabant, Jan Sanders, and Lia van der Heijden. They were interviewed by the VPRO in 2010 and read parts of his original text in order to illustrate how accessible his autobiographical language is for modern speakers. Jan Sanders also published another book from his memoires that specifically retraced Adriaan van der Willigen's travels through Belgium. This book, that compares his experiences in 1792 (when the French entered Belgium) to his experiences on later travels in 1820 and 1827 (when Belgium was seceding from the Netherlands), forms an interesting historical document on Dutch-Belgian history, and was presented in Haarlem to the Belgian ambassador to the Netherlands, Frank Geerkens, in May 2011.

== Works ==
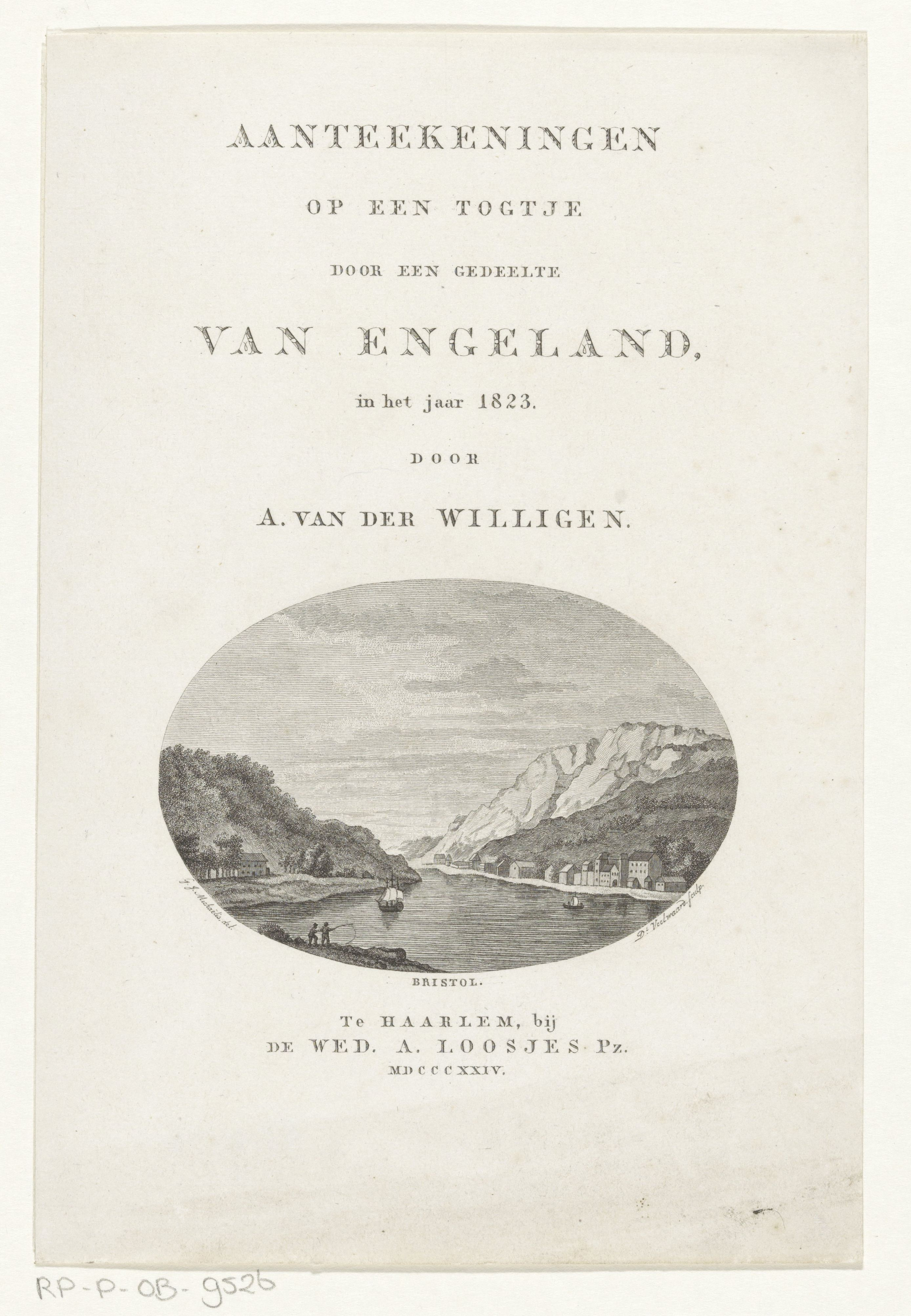
Notes on a trip to England (1824)

- Selico, 1794
- Schoolfeest, gevierd te Tilburg 17 januari 1796 met de toevoeging Gedrukt te Tilburg bij J.C. Vieweg. Mede te bekomen bij Wed. Vieweg te 's-Bosch
- Claudine, Play based on story by Jean-Pierre Claris de Florian, Haarlem, published by J. van Walré en Comp. (theater company), 1797
- De Recommandatiebrieven, 1800
- Travels through France, in letters to the editor (3 volumes with plates), Haarlem, published by A. Loosjes, 1805, 1806, 1807
- Paris at the start of the 19th century (with plates), Haarlem, published by A. Loosjes, 1806
- A trip from Paris to Naples, via Tyrol, and from there through Switzerland and along the Rhine back to Holland (with plates), Haarlem, published by A. Loosjes, 1811.
- Geschiedenis der vaderlandse schilderkunst, sedert de helft der XVIII eeuw. 4 vols. Haarlem, published by A. Loosjes Pz., 1816-1840 (Roeland wrote the first volume published in 1816, but died in 1819, and Adriaan wrote the second volume in 1817, the third in 1820, and the appendix in 1840)
- Notes on a trip through England in the year 1823, Haarlem, published by Wed. A. Loosjes, 1824
- Notes on a trip through part of Germany in the year 1823, Haarlem, published by Wed. A. Loosjes, 1829
- Memoires 1766-1840
