= Teylers Tweede Genootschap =

Dutch organisation to promote and award prizes for research

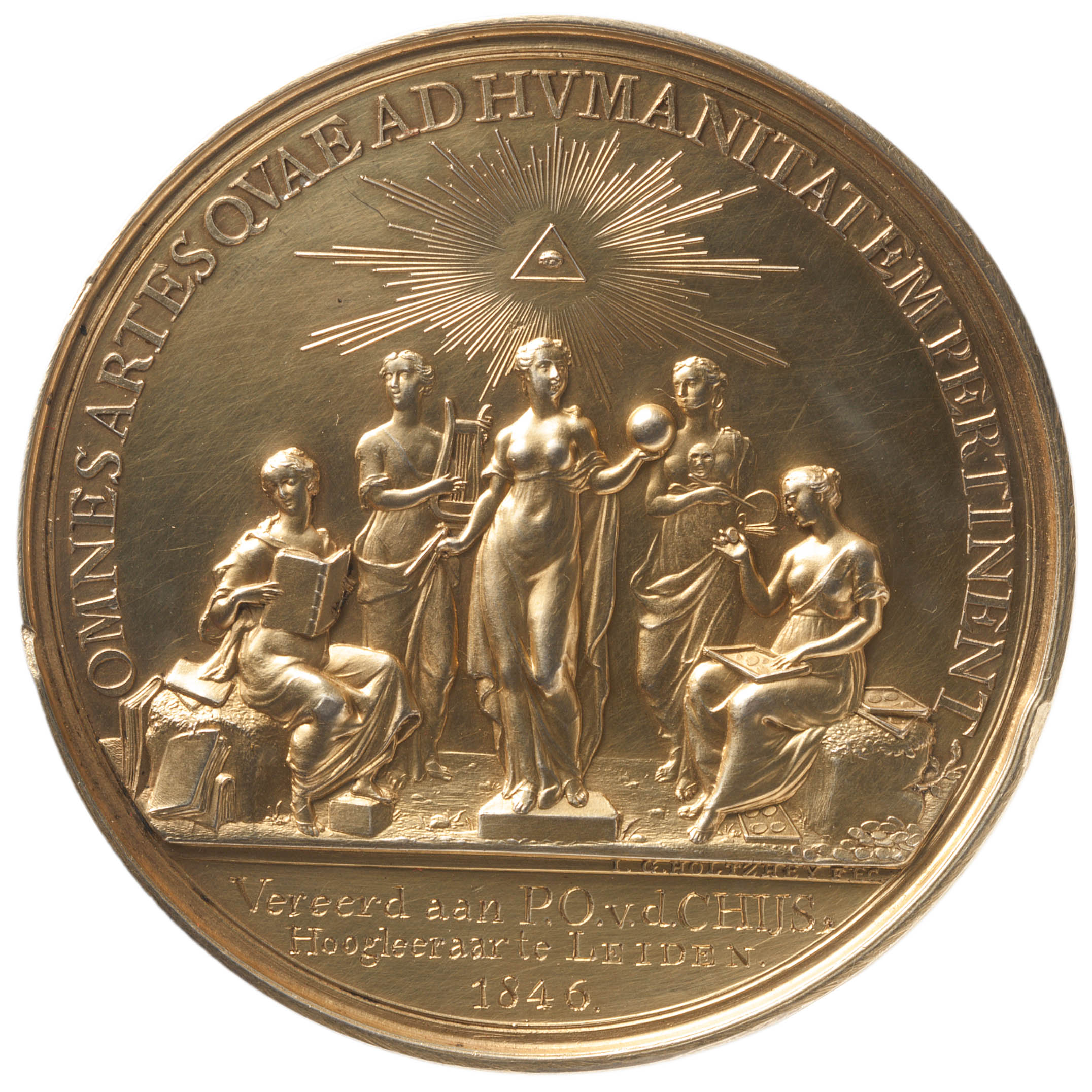
Silver prize medal of Teylers Second Society, designed by Johann Georg Holtzhey in 1778

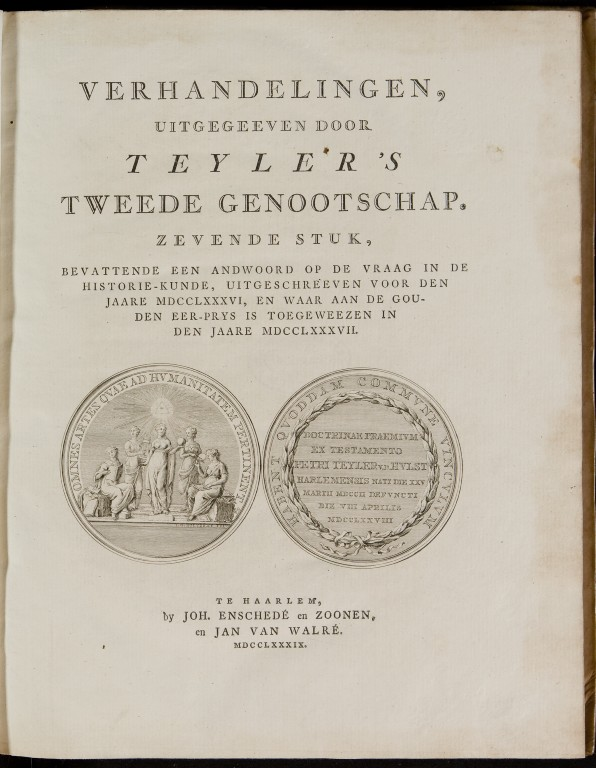
Verhandelingen van Teylers Tweede Genootschap (The Proceedings of Teylers Second society), title page.

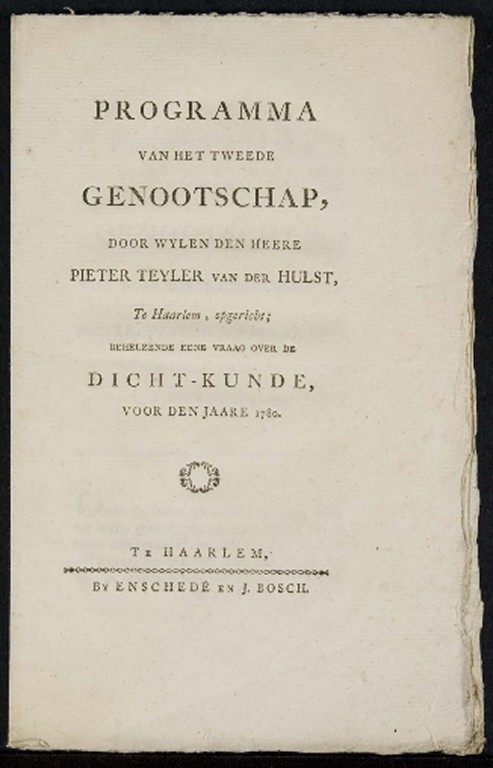
Competition announcement and regulations of Teylers Second Society, 1780

Teylers Tweede Genootschap (English: Teylers Second Society), also known as the Wetenschappelijk Genootschap (Scientific Society) is one of the two societies founded within the Teylers Stichting with the purpose to promote and award prizes for research. They were the result of the testament of the Dutch 18th-century merchant Pieter Teyler van der Hulst. The Second Society is focused on art and science, while the First Society is focused on theology.

== History ==
Both societies were founded in 1778, and the specific areas of interest to the Second Society are Physics, Biology, Literature, History, the study of Art, and Numismatics. The society has six members, and the first members appointed in 1778 by Teyler himself were:

- Gerrit Willem van Oosten de Bruijn
- Cornelis Elout
- Jan Bosch
- Johannes Enschedé
- Jean le Clé
- Bernardus Vriends

The first task of the new society was to commission a prize medal and set up a prize contest. Like the First Society, they ordered a medal from Johann Georg Holtzhey and the allegory on the front of the medal shows an all-seeing eye in a halo, with a symbolic representation of the five arts (from left to right: history (folio), poetry (lyre), physics (globe and compass), drawing (brush and palette) and numismatics (coin and medal tableau). The text around the edge means All sciences that relate to human civilization, have a certain common bond. The reverse side of the medal leaves room for the date and the winner's name.

The idea was to discuss theory and present a question each year for the prize medal to be awarded. During the first ten years, only four prize medals were awarded, though five papers were published (in 1802 Jan Nieuwenhuis did not win a medal, but his paper appeared in the "Verhandelingen"). Sometimes just a gold medal was awarded, and sometimes both gold and silver medals were awarded, but often there were no contestants at all. The first gold medal winner was Martinus van Marum, who won the first prize in 1778 with his paper "Phlogisteerde en niet-phlogisteerde lucht" challenging phlogiston theory. He replaced Elout the next year and became conservator of the physics cabinet.

In 1780, Bosch was replaced by Jean Gijsbert Decker, and Enschedé by Willem Anne Lestevenon.

The society still promotes research with prize medals.

== See also ==
- Teylers Stichting
- Teylers Eerste Genootschap (English: Teylers First Society)
- List of members of Teylers Tweede Genootschap

== External sources ==
- Museum website on Teylers Second Society
- Museum website on the 18th century practice of essay competitions
