= Hofje van Noblet =

Hofje in Haarlem, Netherlands

Coordinates: 52°23′06″N 4°38′32″E

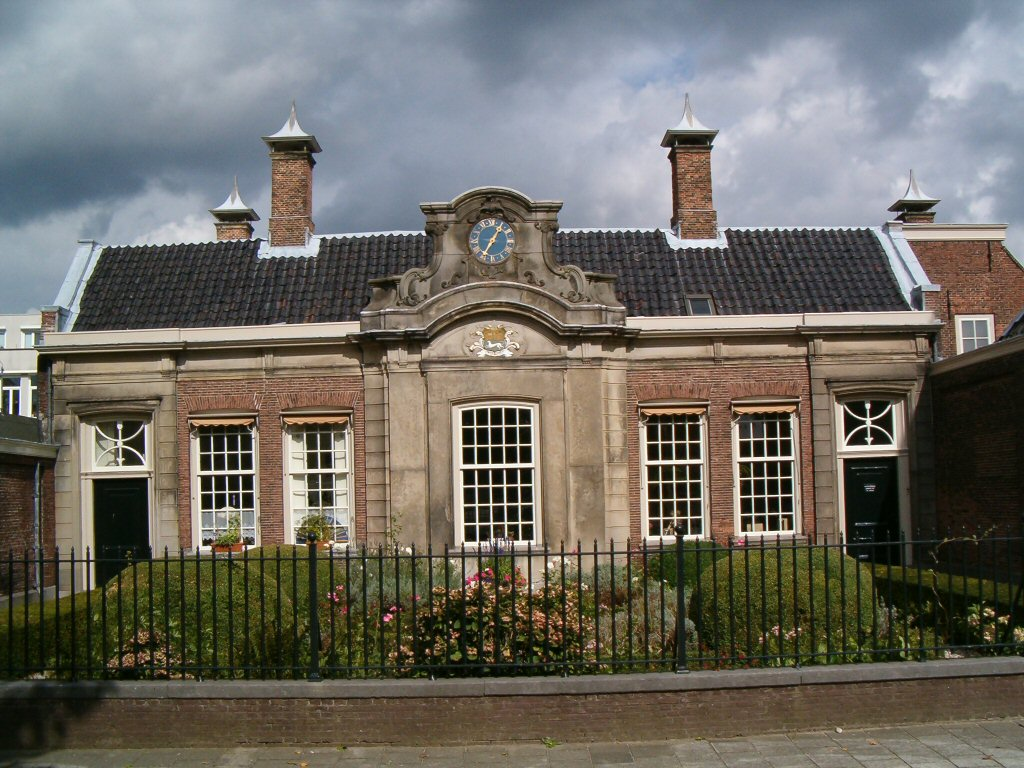
Front entrance of the hofje.

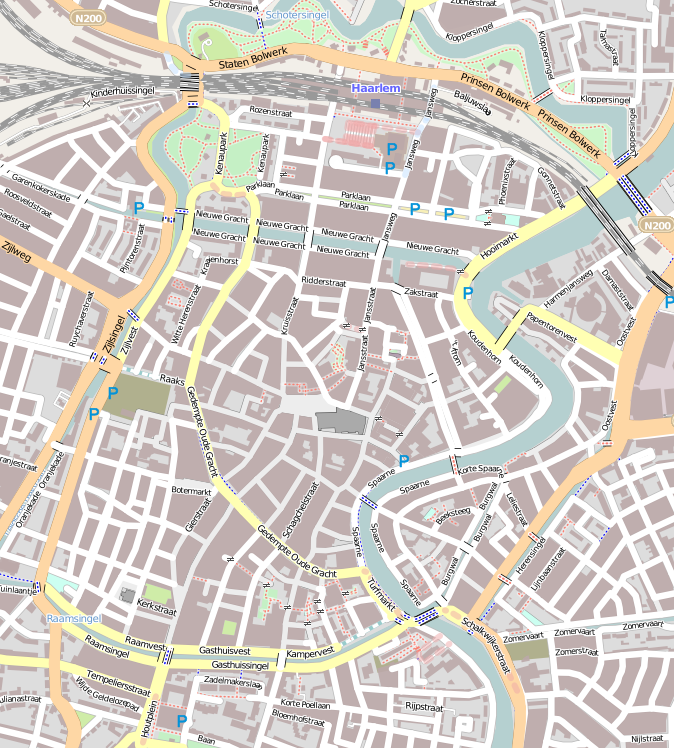
The Hofje van Staats is on the Jansstraat, and the Hofje van Noblet is on the Nieuwe Gracht, overlooking the Spaarne river.

The Hofje van Noblet is a hofje in Haarlem, Netherlands.

== History ==
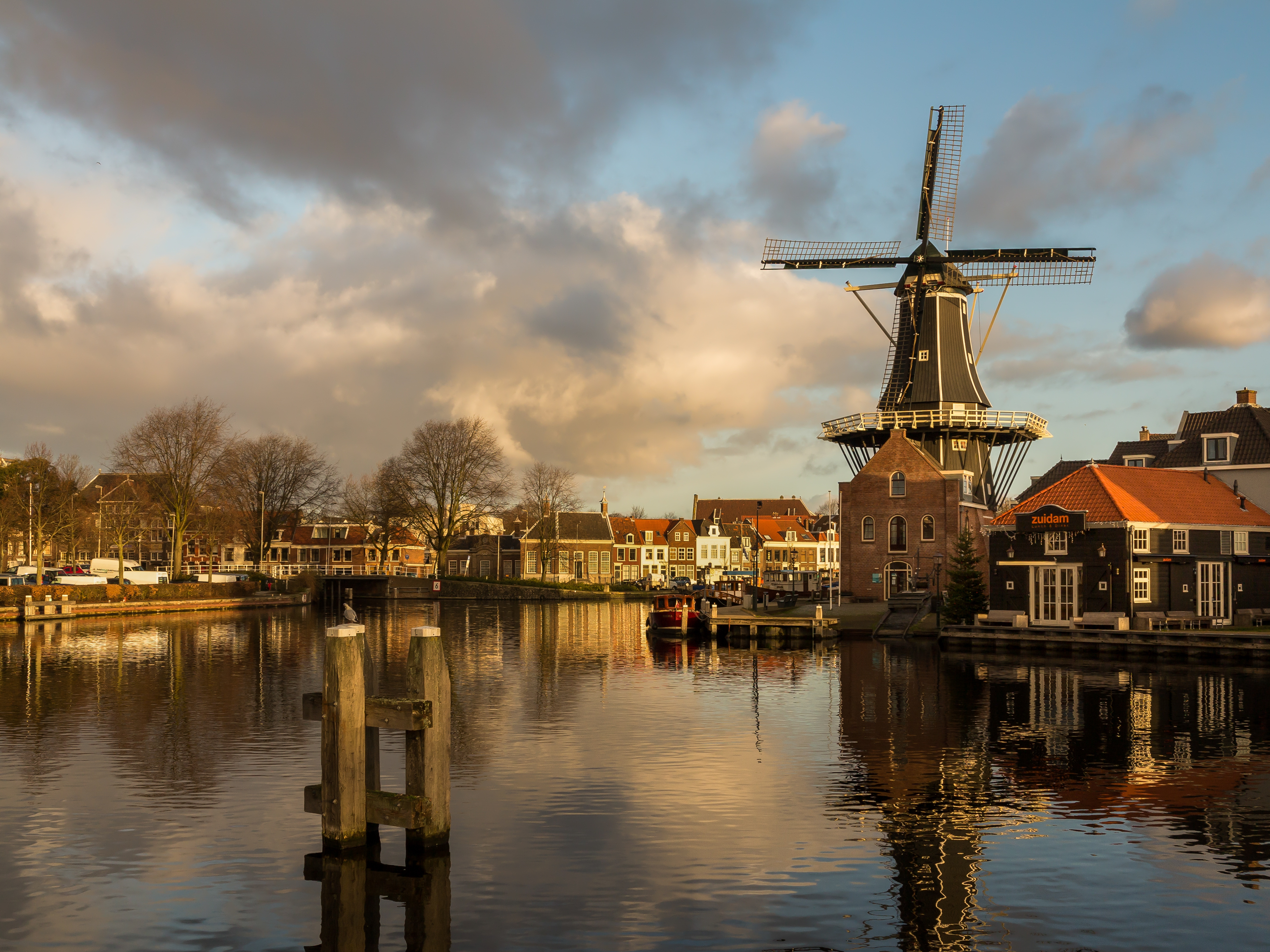
The hofje (center) is situated on the corner of the Spaarne river and the Nieuwe Gracht canal and the Regents' rooms overlook Haarlem and the Spaarne (thus the name Haerlem en Spaargesigt)

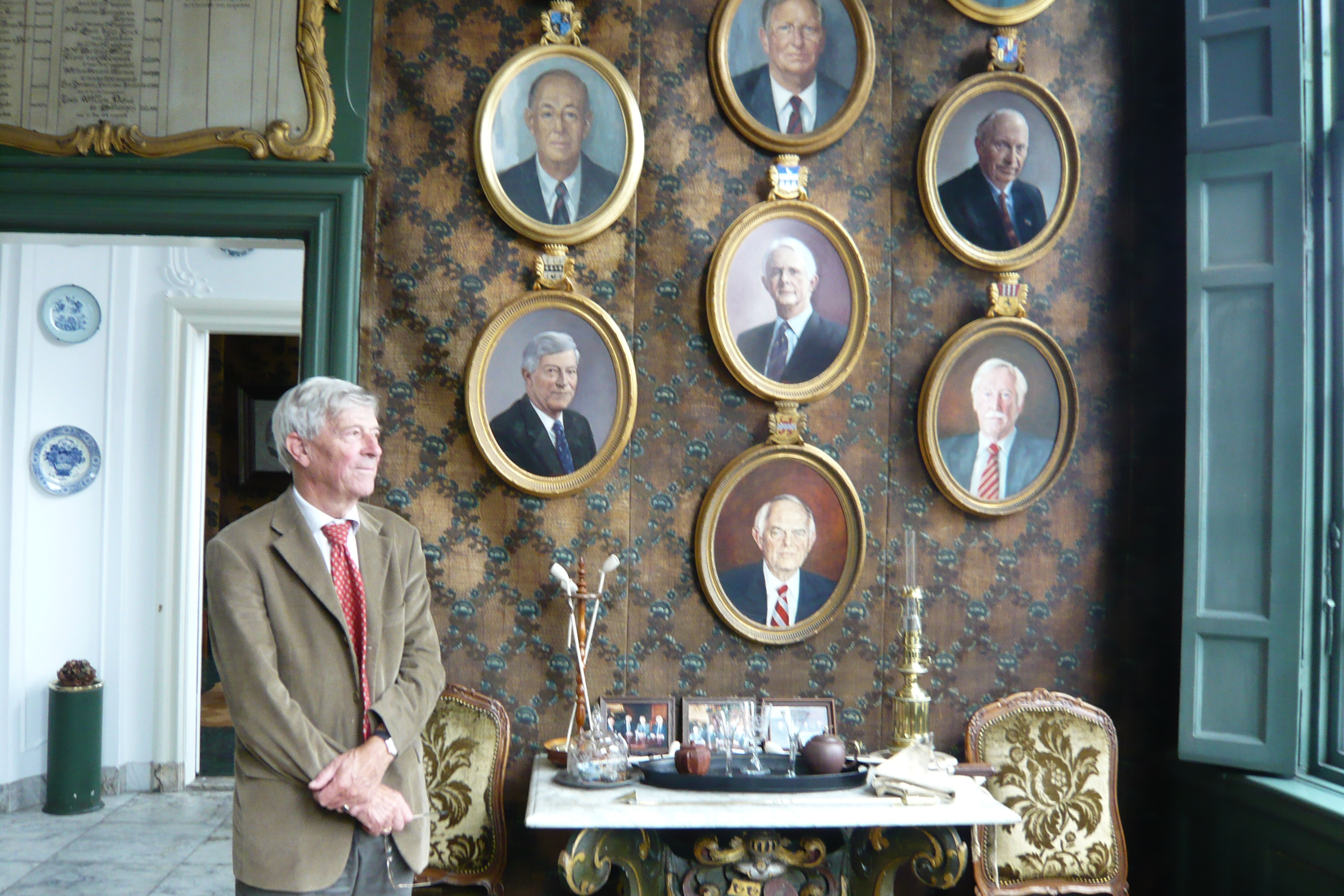
A regent of the hofje posing next to his portrait in the regent's room of the Hofje van Noblet.

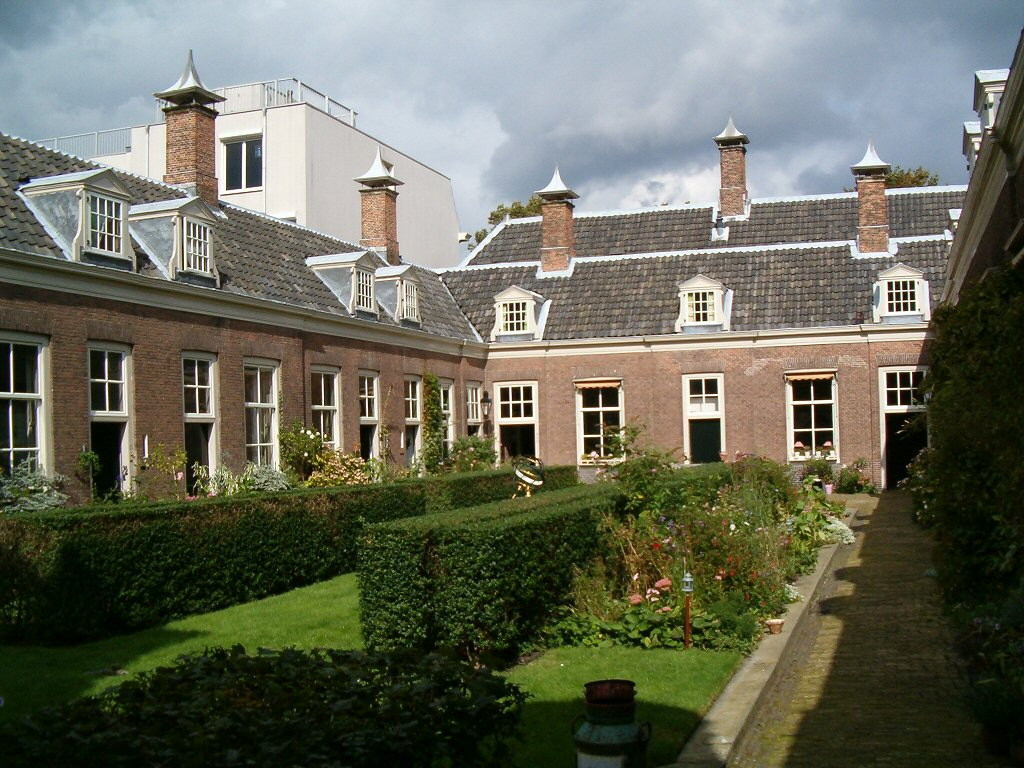
The Hofje van Noblet.

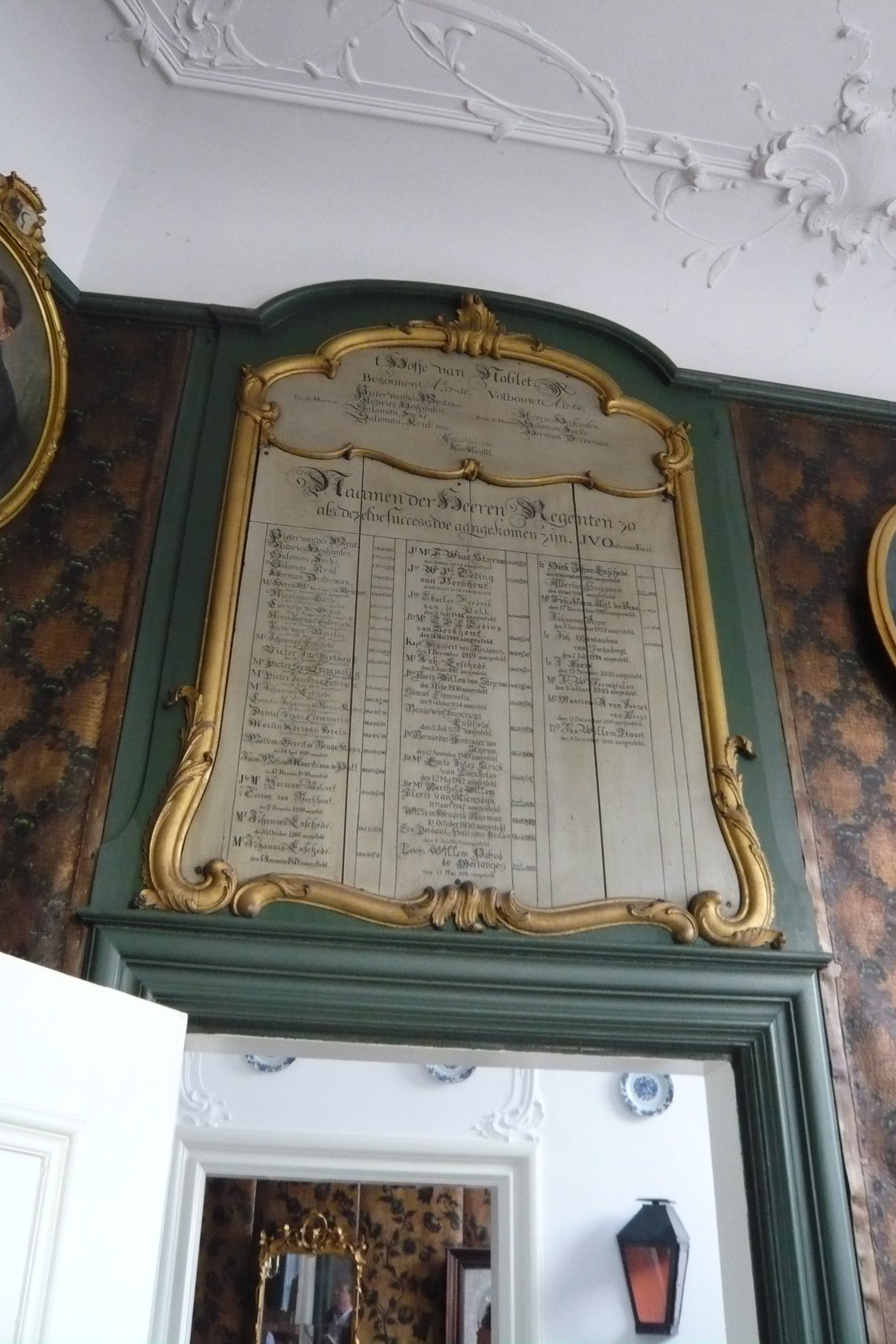
Name board "'T Hofje van Noblet begonnen 1758 volbouwt 1760" with the list of names of the regents of the Hofjes Staats and Noblet, starting in 1758-1760

It was built in 1761 from the legacy of Leonard Noblet and his sisters Sara en Geertruida. The houses in the hofje are built in the garden of the house of the Noblet family, Haerlem en Spaargesigt. The father of Leonard, Elezar Noblet, bought it in 1737. The Noblet family originally came from Amsterdam. Because Leonard, Sara and Geertruida had no legal heirs, they decided to construct a common last will. They wrote that they wanted to found a hofje, and that the governors of the nearby Hofje van Staats would be the executors of their will.

The hofje was built with 20 houses. Ten for women from Haarlem, on the east-side of the hof, and ten for women from Amsterdam, at the west-side. The women living there had to be at least 50 years old, had to have been single their whole life and had to have been a member of the Nederduits Gereformeerde Kerk, an old name of the Dutch Reformed Church.

A part of the original house of the Noblet family serves as the house of the supervisor of the hofje, another part is the official housing of the governors (regents) of the hofje (who are also the governors of the Hofje van Staats).

The main entrance of the hofje is located on the Nieuwe Gracht overlooking the Spaarne river and there is a back entrance on the Parklaan. When the hofje was built that was not called the Parklaan, but 'Achter Nieuwe Gracht,' a canal. The entrance to the old house of the Noblet family is located on the Hooimarkt. An original drawing of the Hofje van Staats, as well as items from that hofje's history, are located in the hall and regent's room of the Hofje van Noblet, whose finances are also managed by the same "Foundation for the preservation of the Hofjes Staats and Noblet." Above the doorway to the Regent's room, a board with the list of names of the regents hangs with the dates of their appointment, which are also the dates of their oval portraits that hang in the two front rooms.

== List of regents and their portraits ==
Regent's name	Oval portrait artist	Year/link to portrait
Andries Heshuysen	Frans Decker	1724
Salomon Focke	Frans Decker	1750
Salomon Krul	Tako Hajo Jelgersma	ca 1750
Herman Draveman	Tako Hajo Jelgersma	1756
Gerrit Willem van Oosten de Bruyn	Tako Hajo Jelgersma	1764
Nicolaas Galle	Tako Hajo Jelgersma	1768
Cornelis de Graat	Tako Hajo Jelgersma	1768
Arent Jan van Eybergen	Wybrand Hendriks	1786
Jacob van Varelen	Wybrand Hendriks	1786
Johannes Enschedé II	Wybrand Hendriks	1791
Victor Jacobus Berkhout	Wybrand Hendriks	1797
Pieter Samuel Crommelin	Wybrand Hendriks	1800
Pieter Jacob van Eybergen	Wybrand Hendriks	1804
Johannes Enschedé III	Wybrand Hendriks	ca.1825
Cornelius Johannes de Bruyn Kops	Wybrand Hendriks	ca.1825
Daniel Frans Crommelin	Jan Adam Kruseman	1825
Marten Adriaan Beels	Jan Adam Kruseman	1825
Willem Gerrit de Bruyn Kops	Antonie Frederik Zürcher	ca. 1860
Jacobus Willem Maurits van de Poll	Antonie Frederik Zürcher	ca. 1860
Adriaan Volkert Teding van Berkhout	Antonie Frederik Zürcher	1861
Johannes Enschedé IV	Johan Heinrich Neuman	ca.1865
Johannes Enschedé V	A.J. Zurel	ca. 1875
Floris Willem van Styrum	Anthonie Jacobus van Wijngaerdt	1888
Willem Philip Teding van Berkhout	Hendrik Antoon Pothast	1884
Charles Fredrik van de Poll	Wim ter Reehorst	1905
Eduard Henri Elisa Teding van Berkhout	Unknown	1906
Gijsbert van Tienhoven	Hagedoorn	1921
Johannes Enschede (1879-1938)	Unknown	ca.1925
Floris Willem van Styrum	Harie Jonas	1932
Samuel Crommelin	Gerrit David Gratama	1934
Boudewijn Franciscus Enschede	Unknown	ca. 1940
Bernard Gertrudus van Styrum	Hendrik Jan Wesseling	1941
Emile Jules Strick van Linschoten	Hendrik Jan Wesseling	1942
Bartold Willem Floris van Riemsdijk	Jaap Pander	1947
Willem Hendrik Bierman	John Brinkworth	1951
Eco Deodaat Haitsma Mulier	Aleid Slingerland	1972
Louis Willem Pahud de Mortanges	Aleid Slingerland	1977
Dirk Johan Enschede	F. van Oordt	ca. 1980
Albertus Huijsman	Aleid Slingerland	1984
Johan Herman Bijl de Vroe	Aleid Slingerland	1986

The hofje was renovated in 1992, when the number of houses was reduced from 20 to 16 to allow for modern living requirements.

Address: Nieuwe Gracht 2
