= Vitringa =

Vitringa is a surname. Notable people with the surname include:

- Campegius Vitringa (1659–1722), Dutch theologian
- Wigerus Vitringa (1657–1725), Dutch painter
