= Warnaar Horstink =

18th-century painter

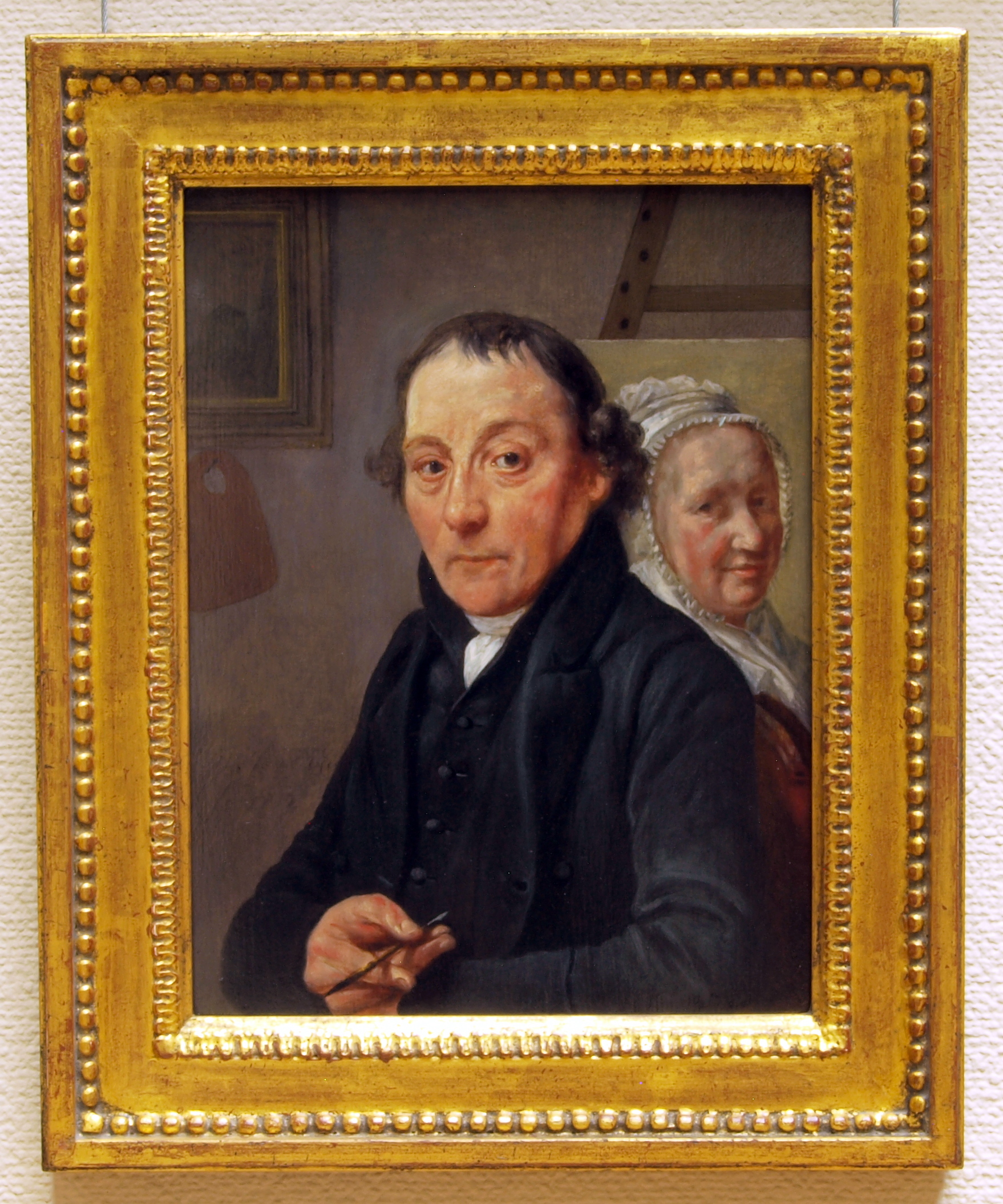
Portrait of Warnaar Horstink by Wybrand Hendriks in the Teylers Eerste Schilderijenzaal

Warnaar Horstink (1756 – 1815), was an 18th-century painter from the Dutch Republic.

== Biography ==
He was born in Haarlem and grew up in the orphanage there and became the pupil of Cornelis van Noorde and Wybrand Hendriks. He is known for landscapes in oils and watercolours, and after he married he became a drawing teacher at the Haarlem Teeken Genootschap, where he was the teacher of Joannes Pieter Visser Bender. He died of a heart attack in Haarlem while looking at drawings with his colleague Pieter Bartholomeusz Barbiers and his body was carried to his grave in the St. Bavochurch by the board members of the Genootschap.
