= Bernardus van Schijndel =

Dutch painter

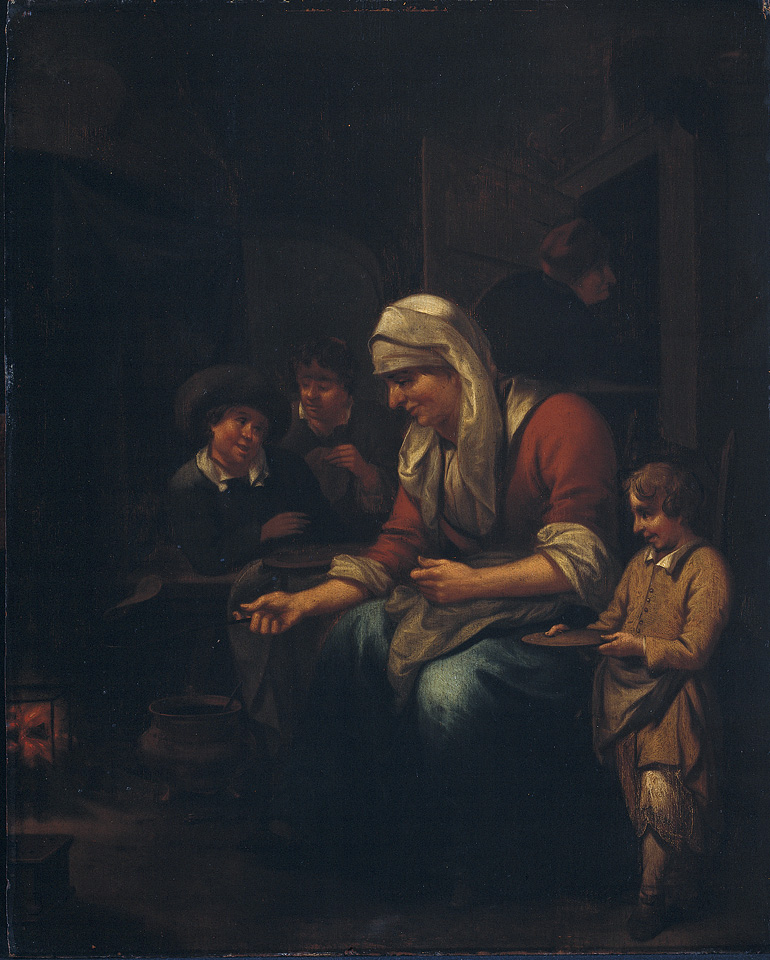
- The pancake baker.
- Born: Bernard van Schijndel; 1647; Weesp
- Died: 1709 (aged 61–62); Haarlem
- Known for: Painting
- Movement: Baroque

Bernardus van Schijndel (1647–1709) was a Dutch Golden Age painter of small scale genre works.

== Biography ==
According to Houbraken, he was a Haarlemmer who lived alongside Reinier (Richard) Brakenburg (1650–1702) in Leeuwarden for a period, where he taught Jelle Sibrandsz, a young painter who later travelled to Italy in 1669.

Though Houbraken wrote that he was the same age, with the same birthplace, and painted in the same style as Brakenburg, he was actually a few years older and was born in Weesp, not Haarlem. He married Lysbet Sanderius in 1677, near Weesp in the town of Diemen, but is registered as living in Leeuwarden from 1671 to 1696. He must have moved to Haarlem sometime after that, which is where he died.
