= Richard Brakenburgh =

Dutch painter

Richard Brakenburgh or Brakenburg (22 May 1650, in Haarlem – 28 December 1702, in Haarlem), was a Dutch Golden Age painter.

== Biography ==
According to Arnold Houbraken he was a light-hearted poet from Haarlem. He was the pupil of Hendrik Mommers who went on to paint clever genre scenes in the manner of Adriaen van Ostade. Though some said he was the pupil of Bernard Schendel, they were the same age and painted in similar styles. He was successful enough at his art that his Frisian widow was able to purchase an annuity after his death in Friesland.

According to the RKD he is registered in Leeuwarden during the years 1670–1687. He is known for both Italianate landscapes and portraits. He painted similar subjects to those of Schendel, representing merry-makings and drunken assemblies. His pictures are ingeniously composed, and well coloured, something in the manner of Adriaen van Ostade, though greatly inferior. They are painted with facility, although they have the appearance of being very highly finished; and he perfectly understood the management of chiaroscuro. His greatest defect is his incorrect drawing of the figure, which he appears not to have studied from nature. The Vienna Gallery has two 'Peasant Scenes' by him, said to have been painted in 1690; the Berlin Museum one, and the Amsterdam Gallery one. In the Brussels Gallery is a 'Children's Feast,' signed and dated 1698; and the Rotterdam Museum has a 'Doctor's Visit,' signed and dated 1696. In Windsor Castle are two good 'Artists' Studios ' by him. He also sometimes practised the art of engraving.

He was the teacher of Wigerus Vitringa, Abraham Pardanus, and Gillis de Winter. He was a follower of Jan Steen. He died at Haarlem in December 1702 and was buried in January 1703.

== Gallery ==
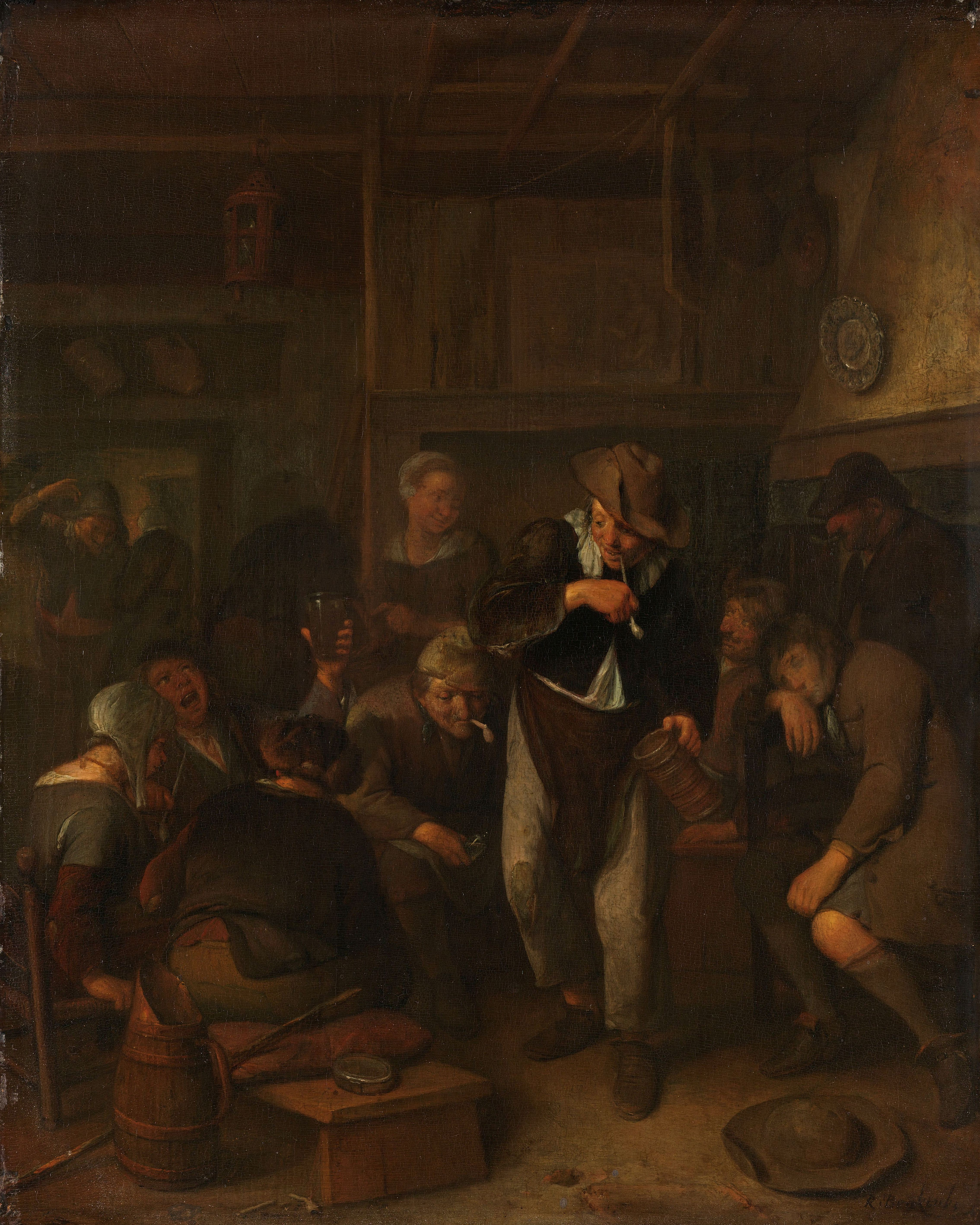
County Inn, Rijksmuseum Amsterdam.

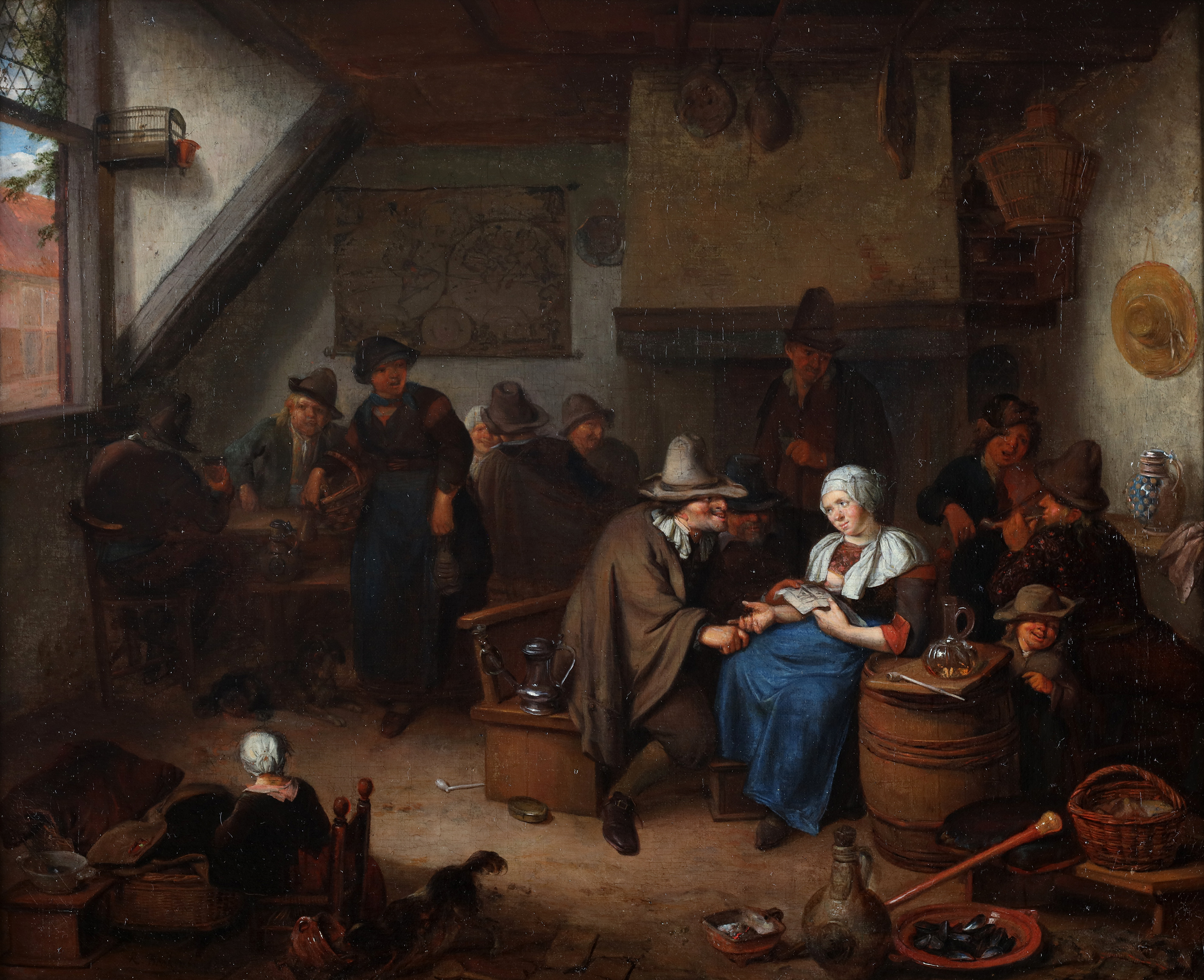
Merry making at the inn (French collection)

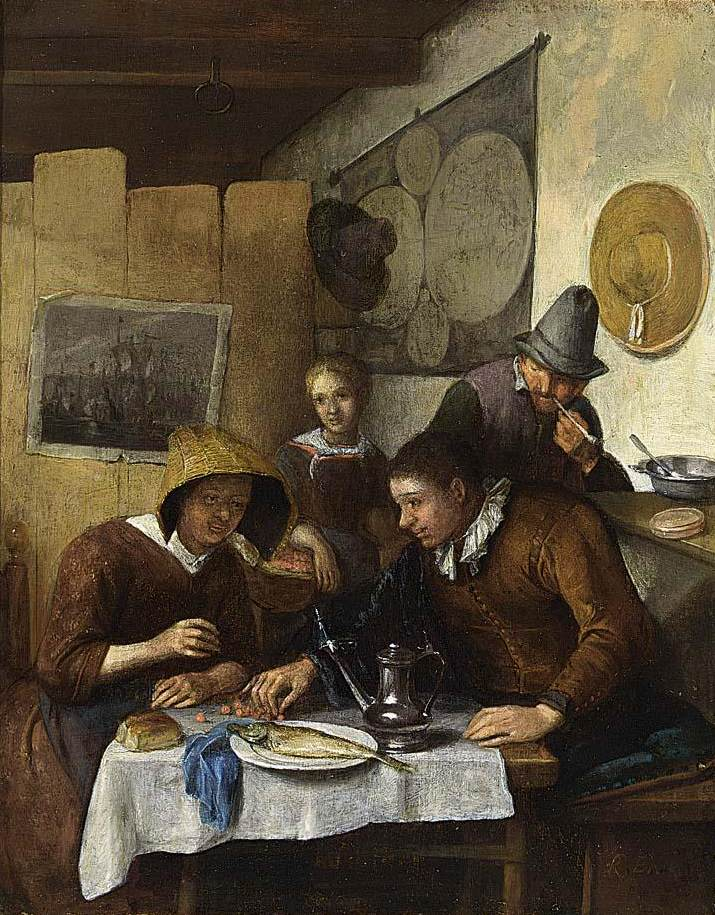
Family Having Breakfast

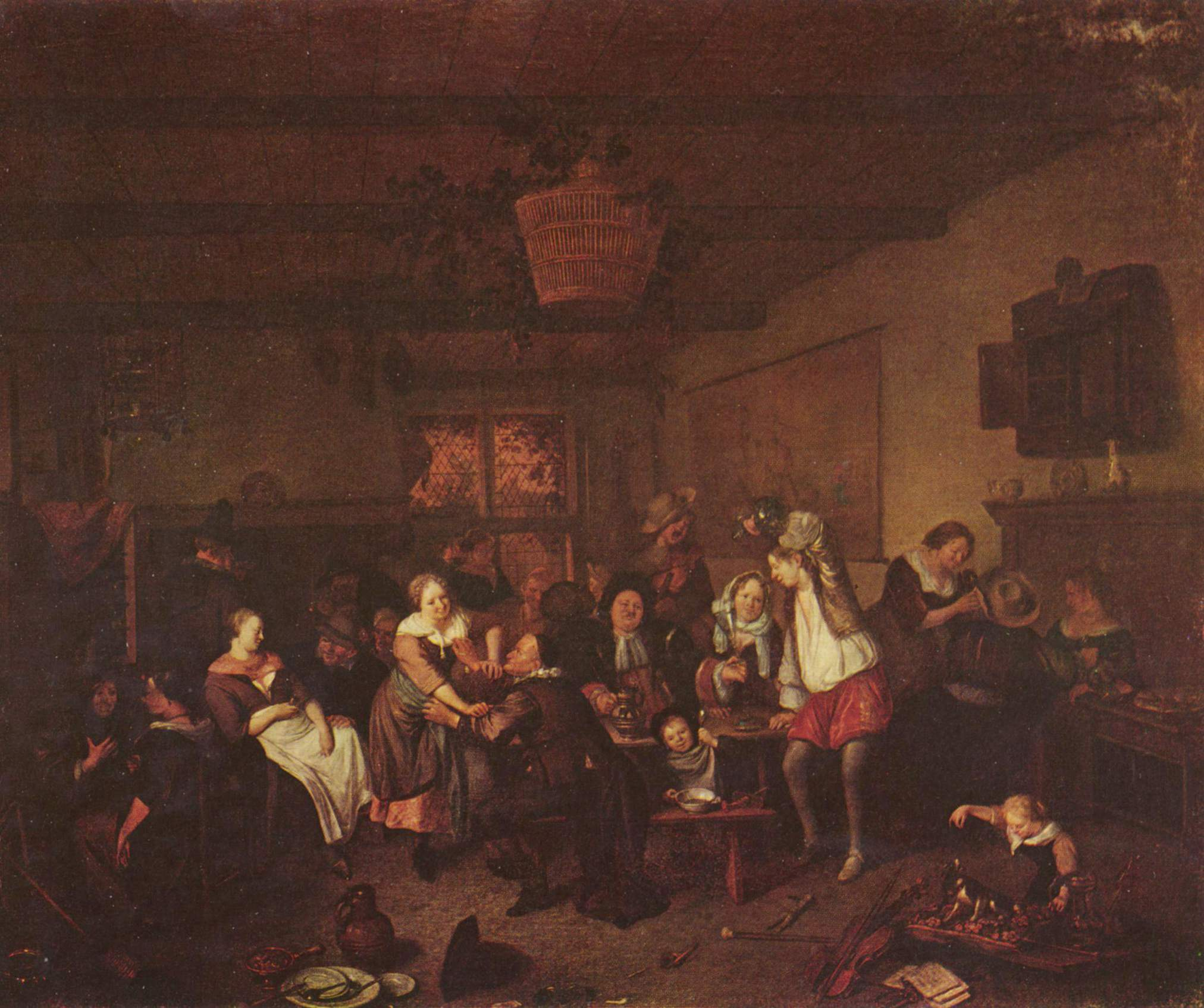
Fröhliche Gesellschaft

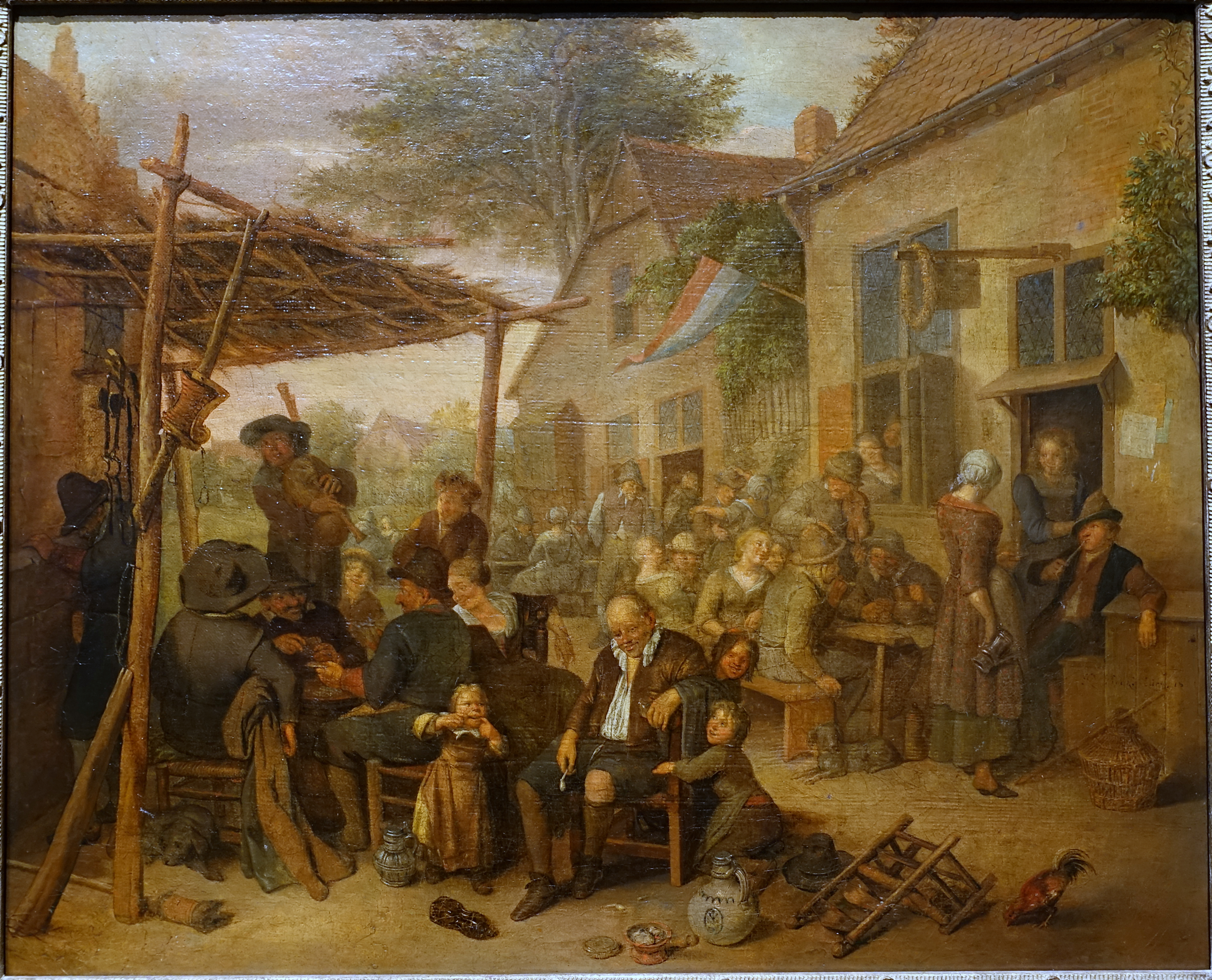
Village Fair

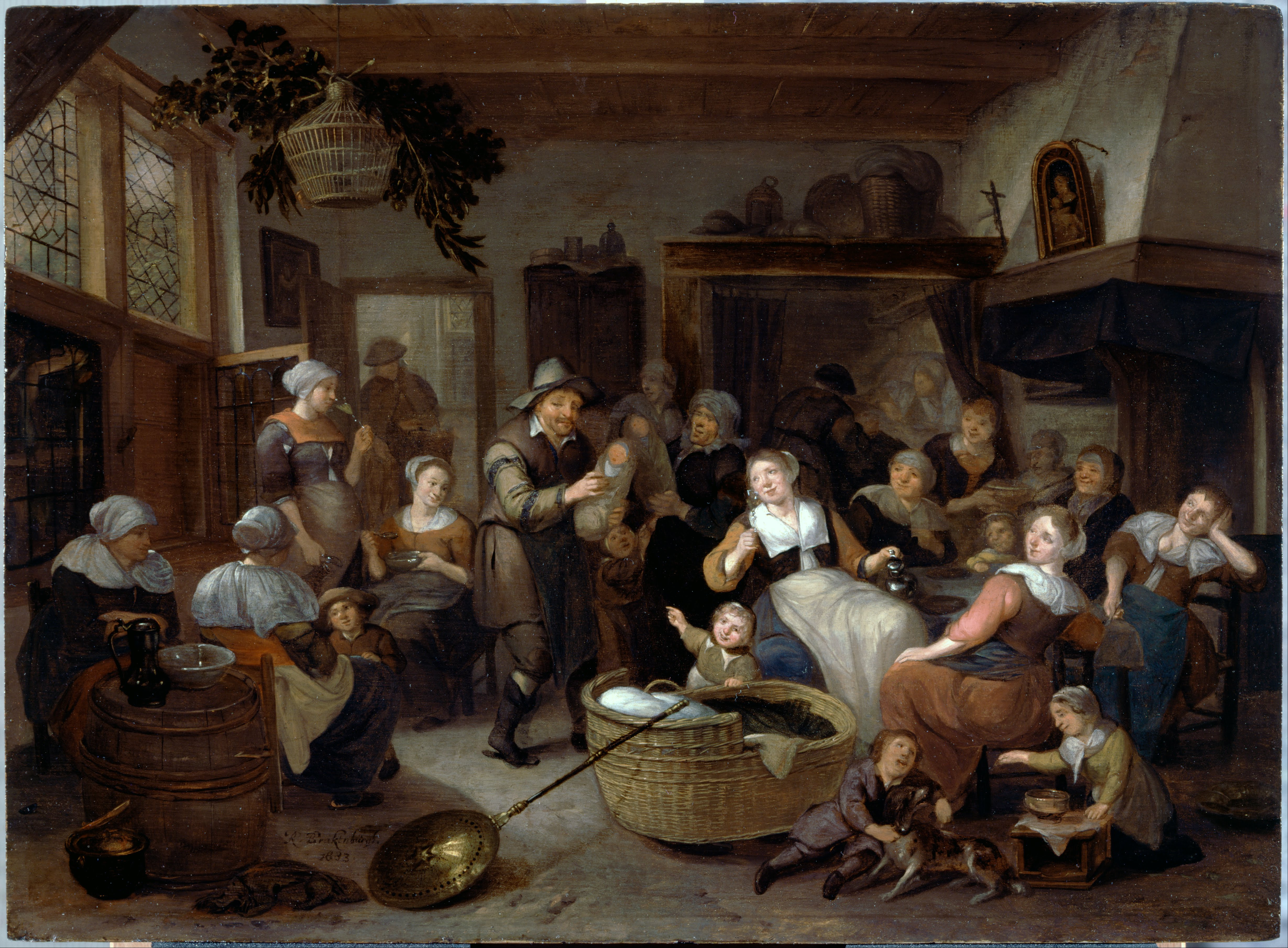
Celebration of a Birth, 1682

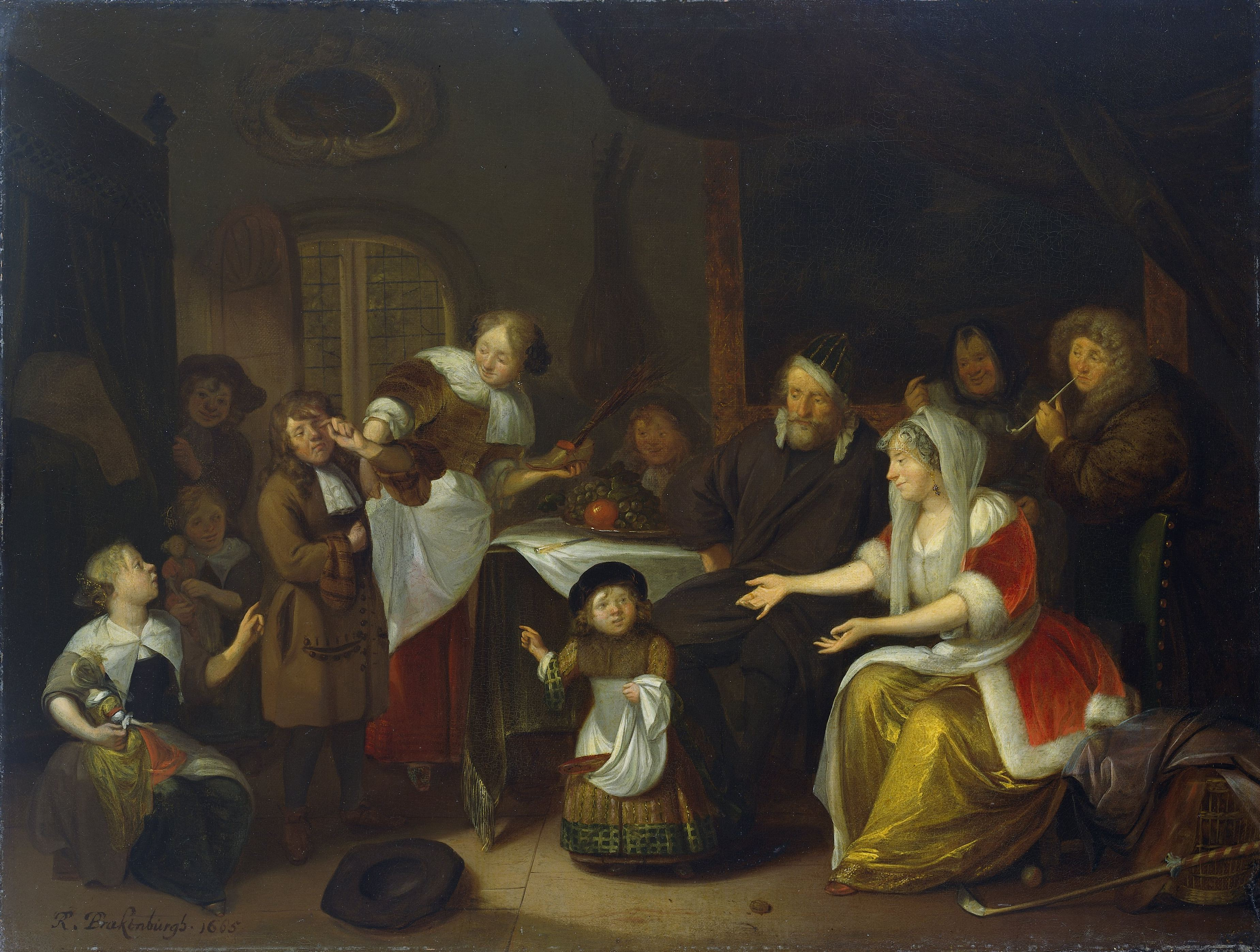
Feast of Saint Nicholas, painted in 1685. Now in the collection of the Rijksmuseum Amsterdam.

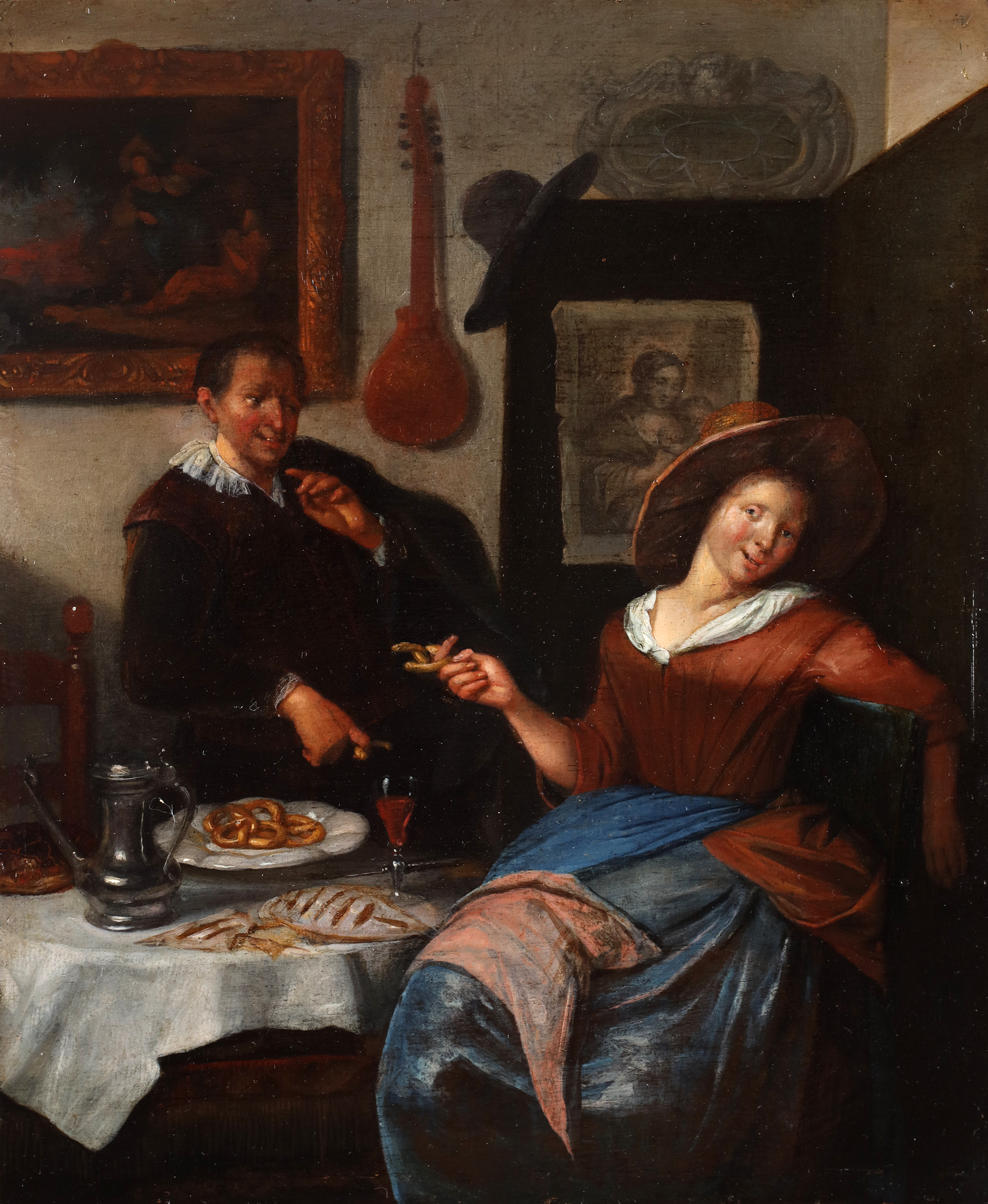
Courting, (French Collection)

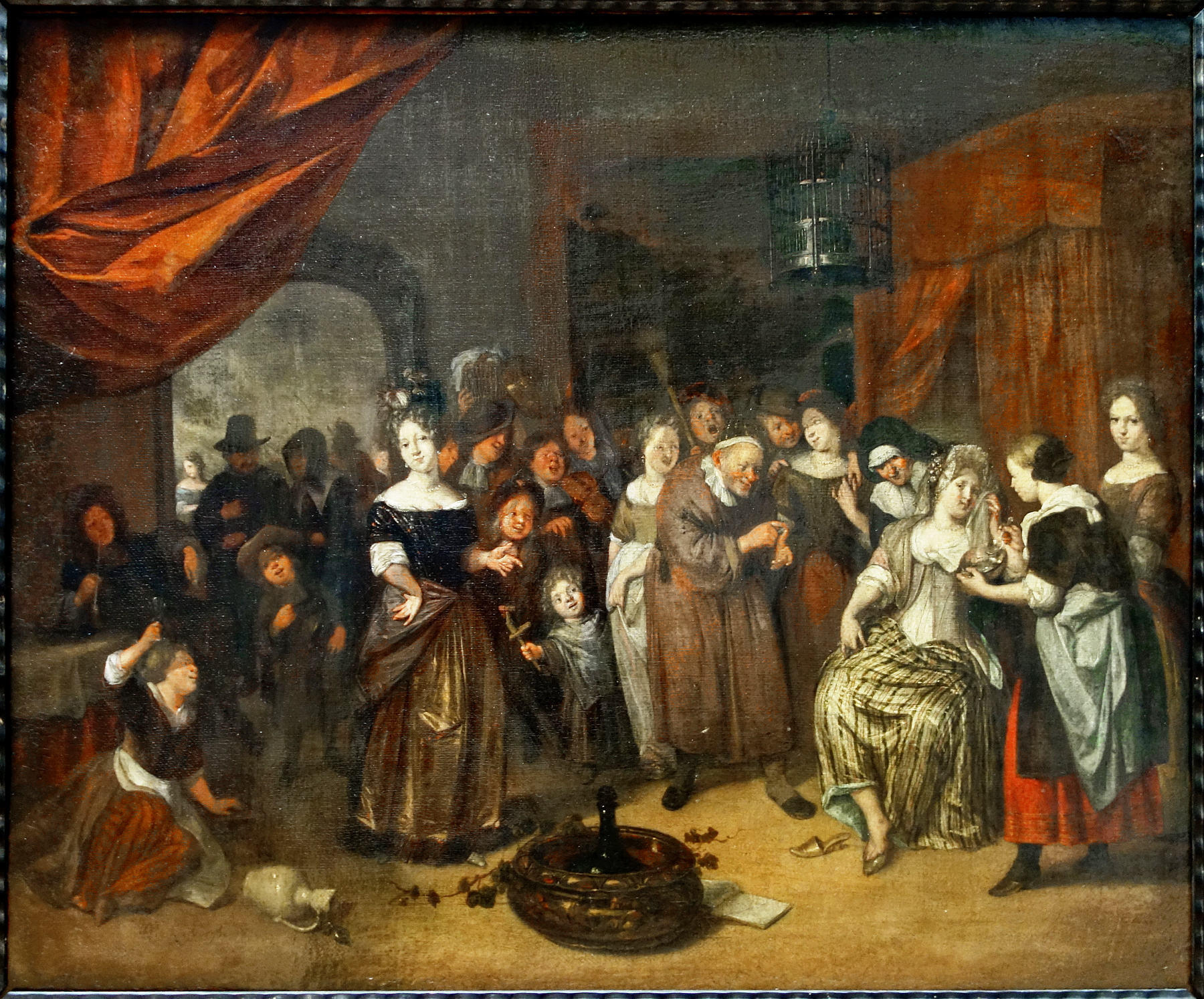
Le lever de la mariée, 1690

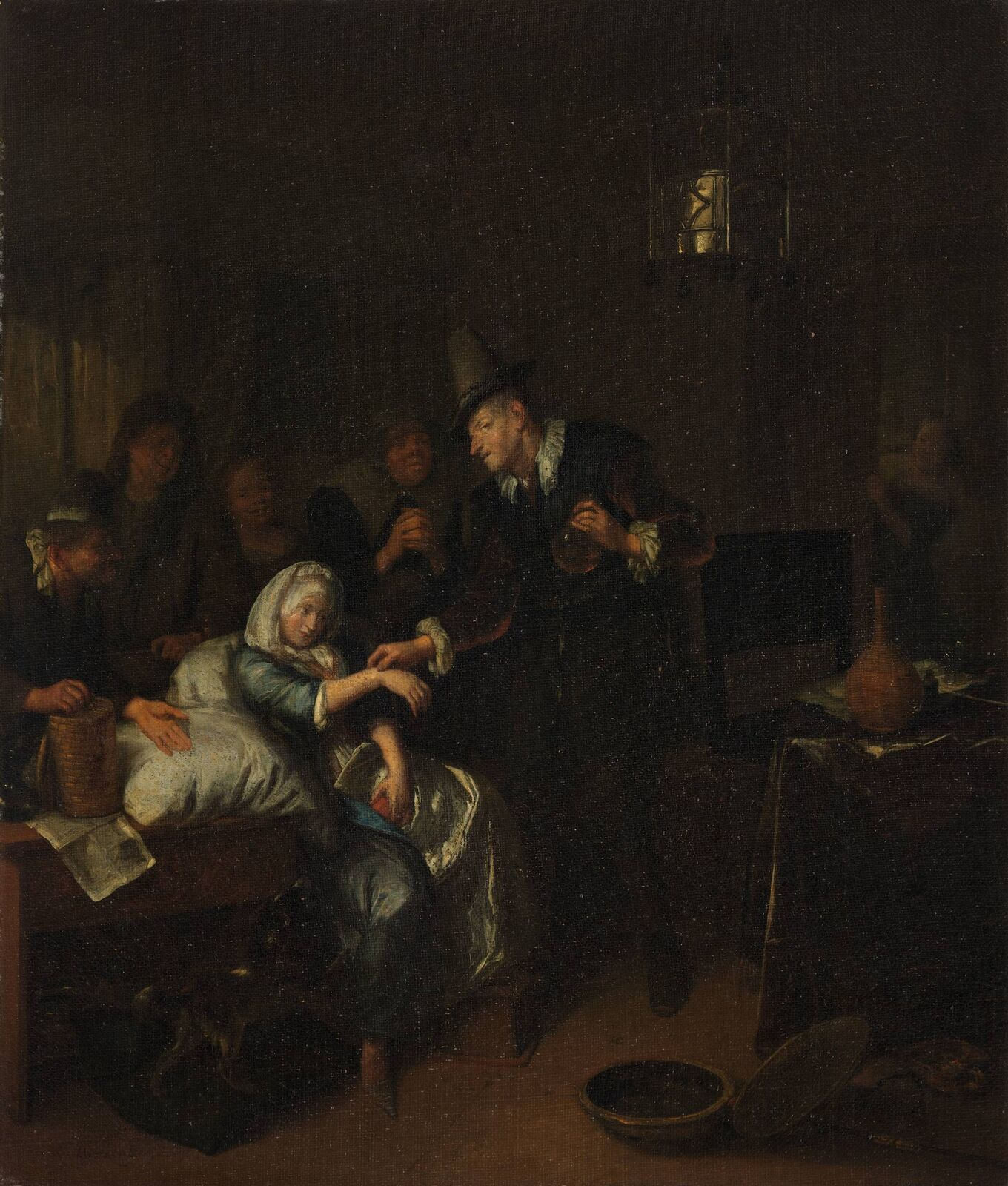
The Doctor's Visit, 1696

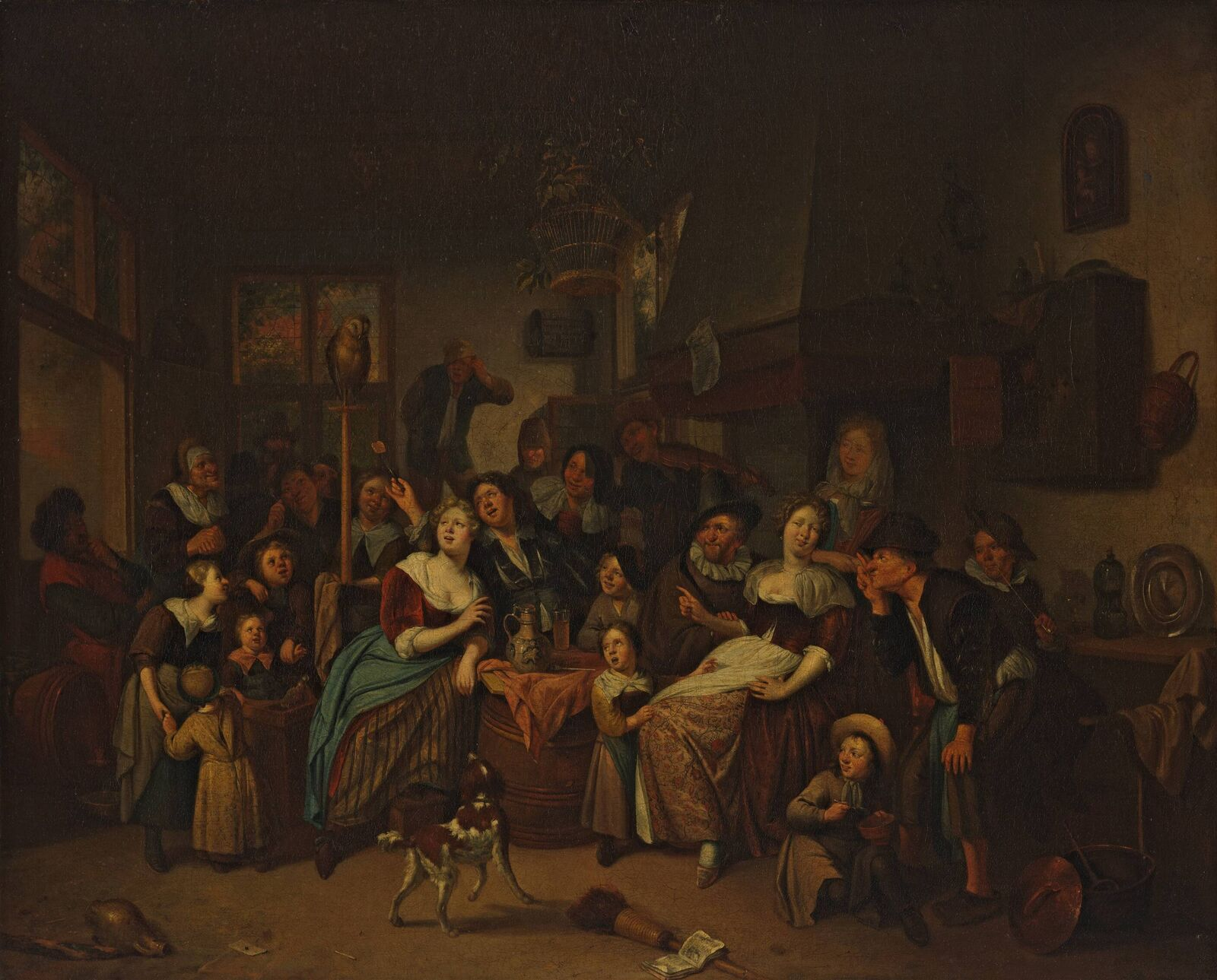
Merry Company, between 1690 and 1700

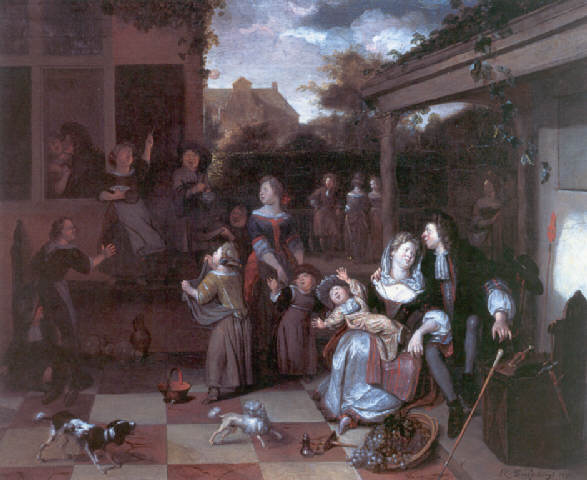
A Family on a Terrace, 1691

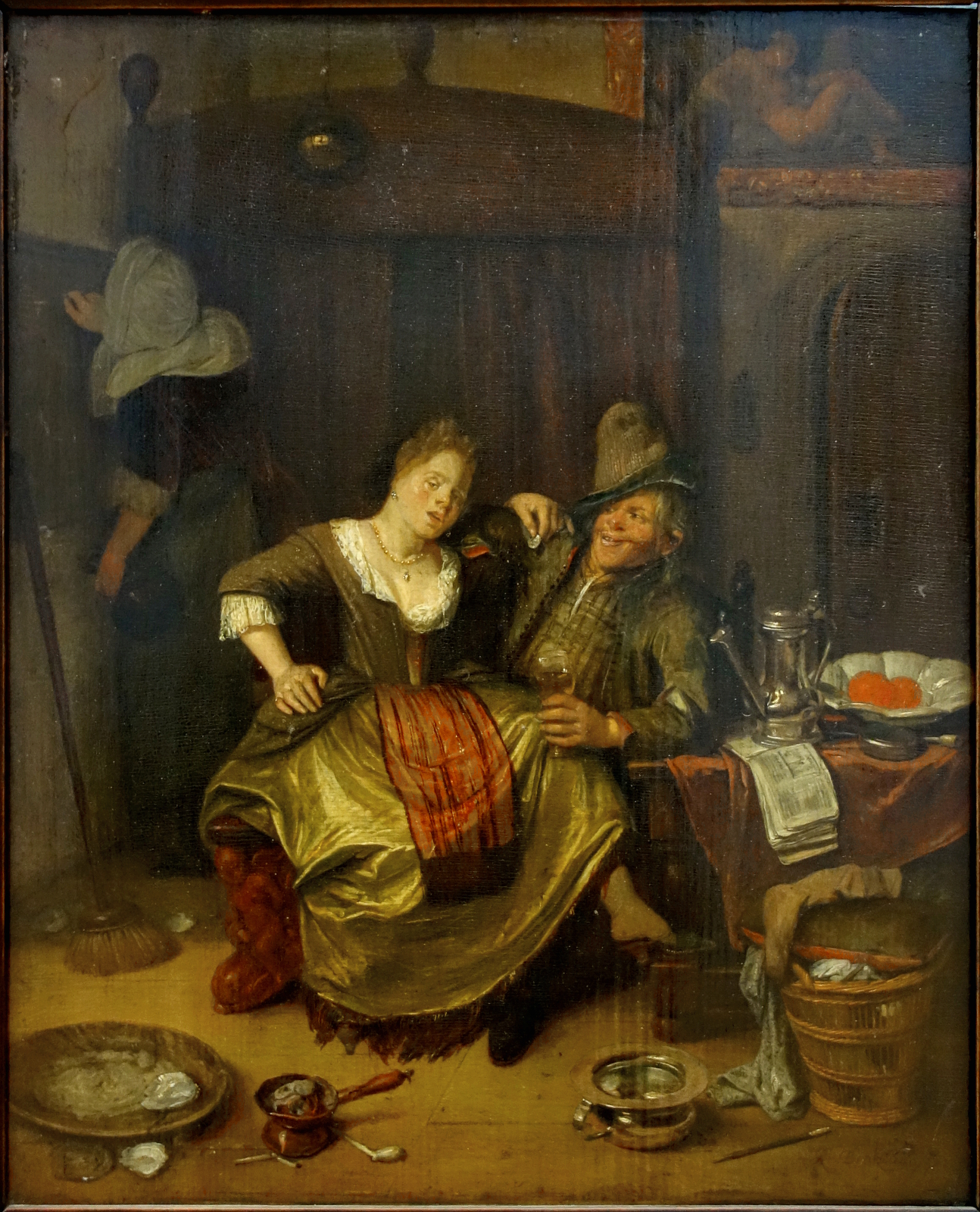
Scène galante, Palais des beaux-arts de Lille, 1698

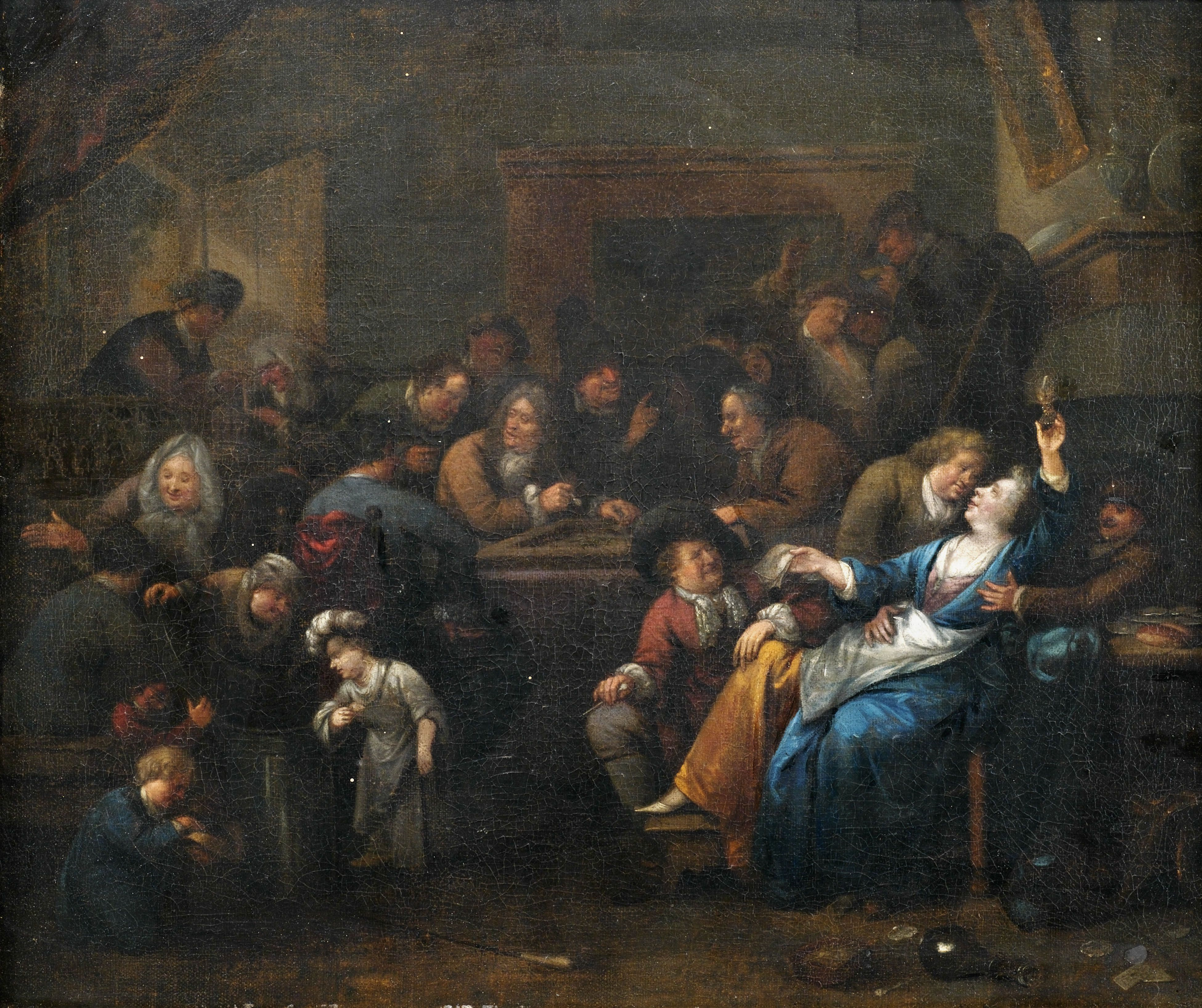
Circle of Richard Brakenburgh In the Tavern

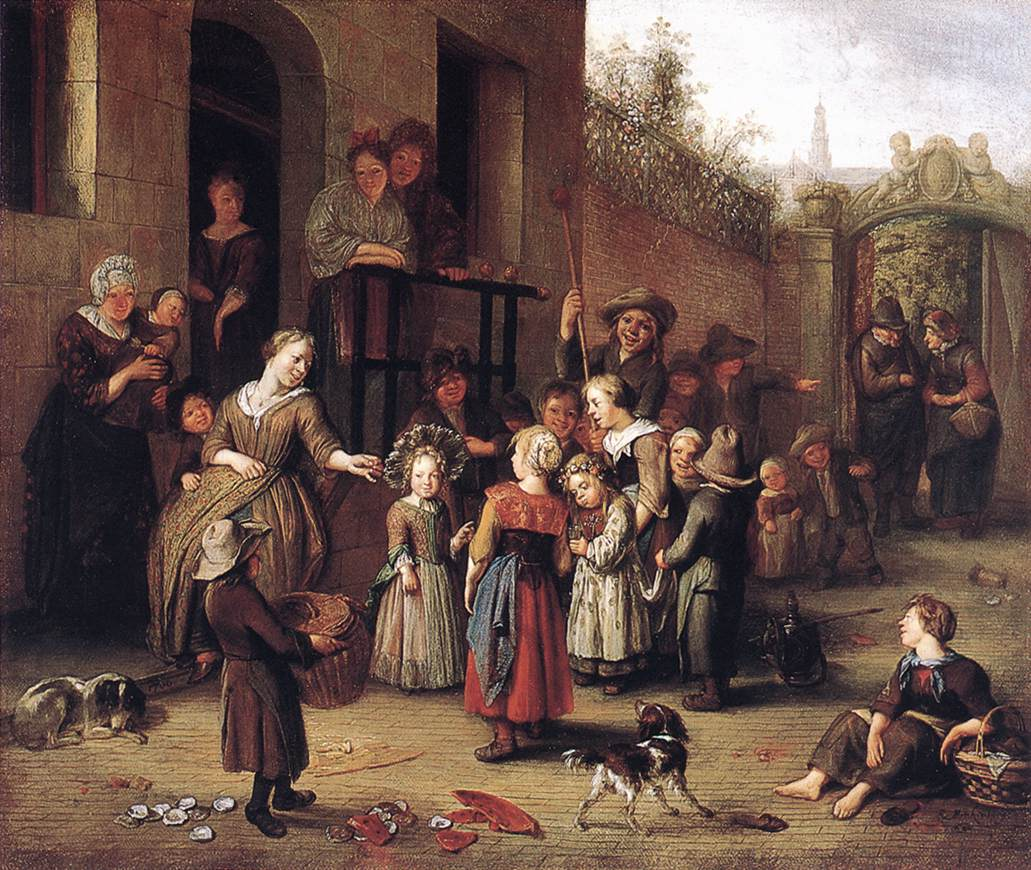
May Queen Festival, 1699

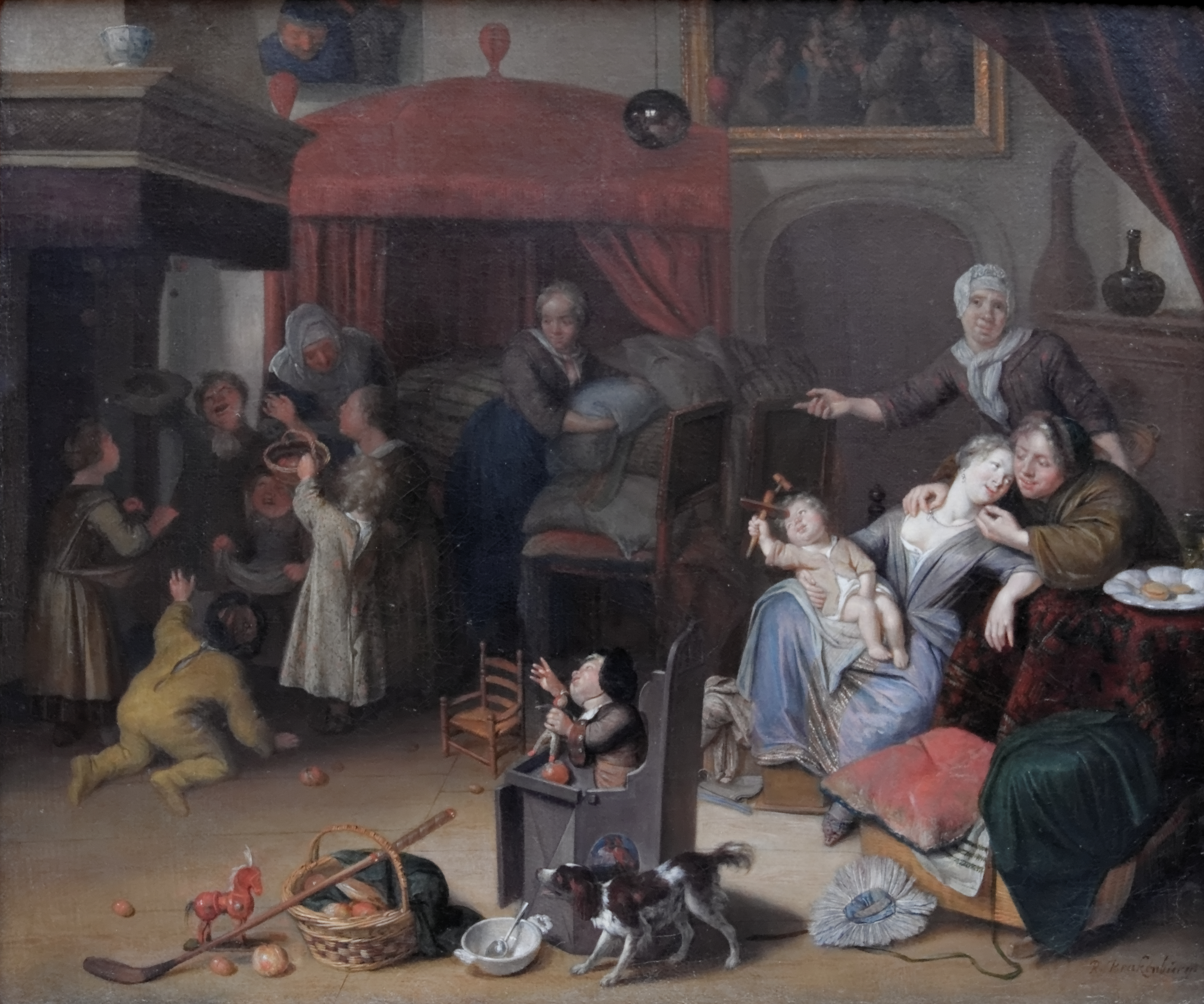
Feast of St. Nicholas, 1699

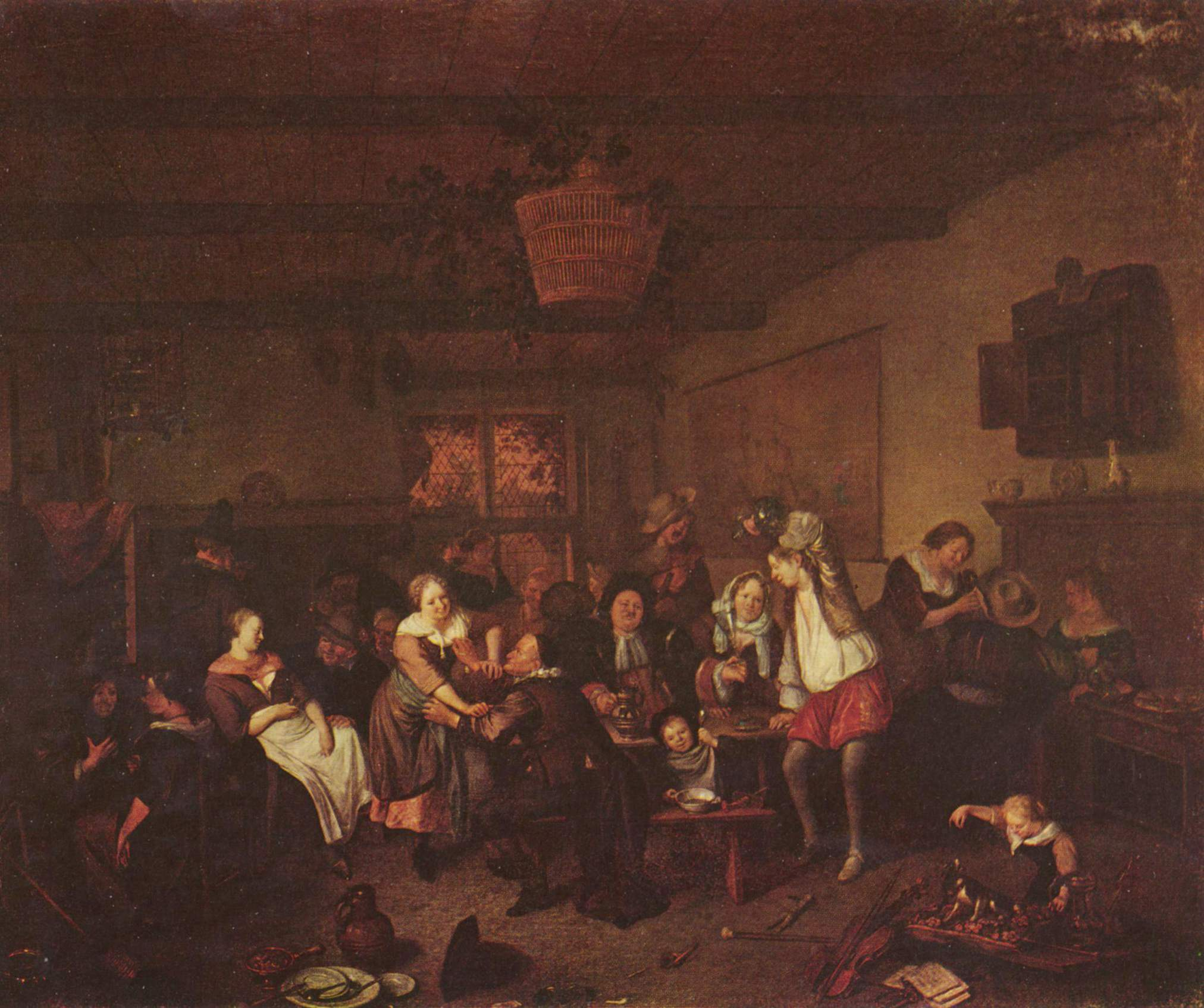
The Yorck Project
