= Wigerus Vitringa =

Dutch painter

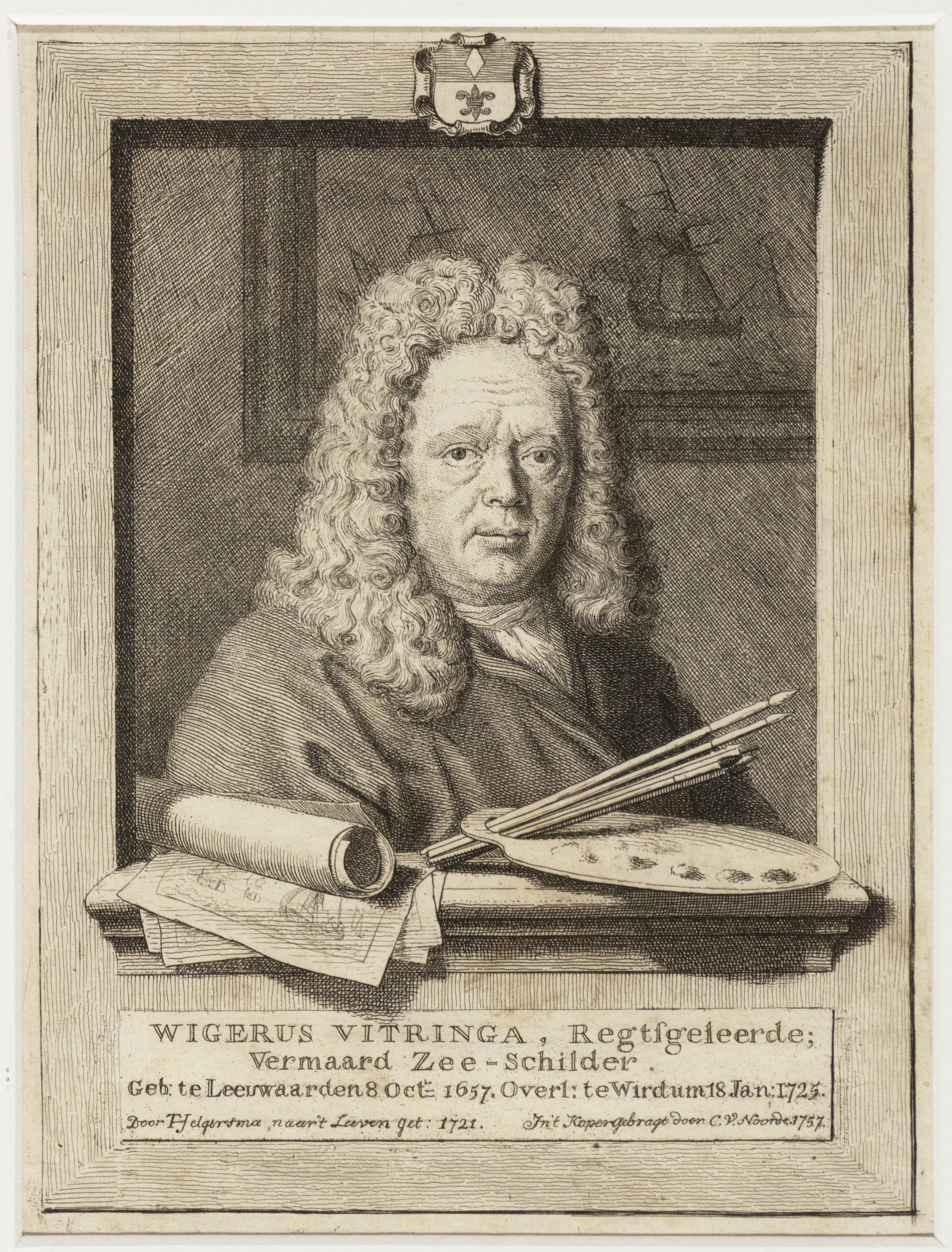
Engraving of Vitringa by Cornelis van Noorde after a drawing by Vitringa's pupil Tako Hajo Jelgersma done in 1721.

Wigerus Vitringa (October 8, 1657 – January 18, 1725), was a Dutch seascape painter.

== Biography ==
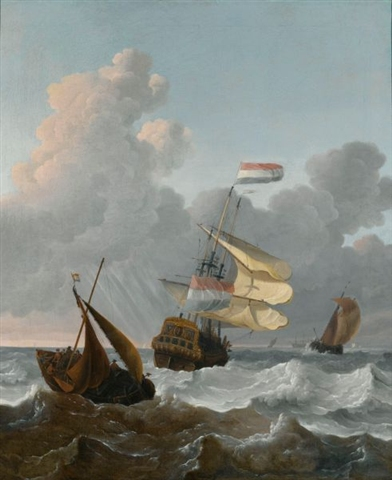
Man of War and smaller ships in rough seas

Vitringa was born in Leeuwarden. According to the RKD he was the son of a prominent lawyer who could financially permit himself a career in the arts. He was the pupil of Richard Brakenburg and possibly also the pupil of Ludolf Bakhuizen, whose style he followed. He moved to Alkmaar in the 1680s where his eyesight slowly deteriorated. He became a member of the Guild of St. Luke there in 1696. In 1708 he returned to Friesland where he became a teacher. His most notable pupil was Tako Hajo Jelgersma. Vitringa died in Wirdum.
