= Hofje van Staats =

Hofje in Haarlem, Netherlands

Coordinates: 52°23′10″N 4°38′25″E

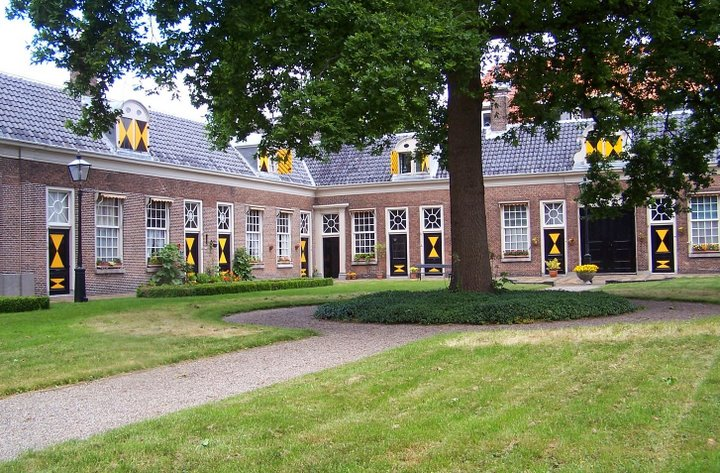
Hofje van Staats

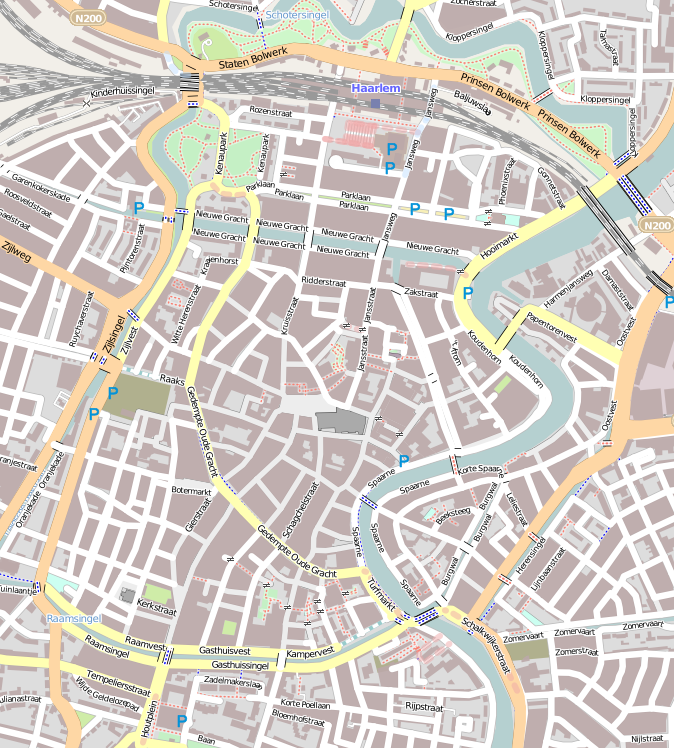
The Hofje van Staats is on the Jansstraat, and the Hofje van Noblet is on the Nieuwe Gracht, overlooking the Spaarne river.

The Hofje van Staats is a hofje in Haarlem, Netherlands, on the Jansweg 39, close to the Haarlem railway station.

== History of the complex ==
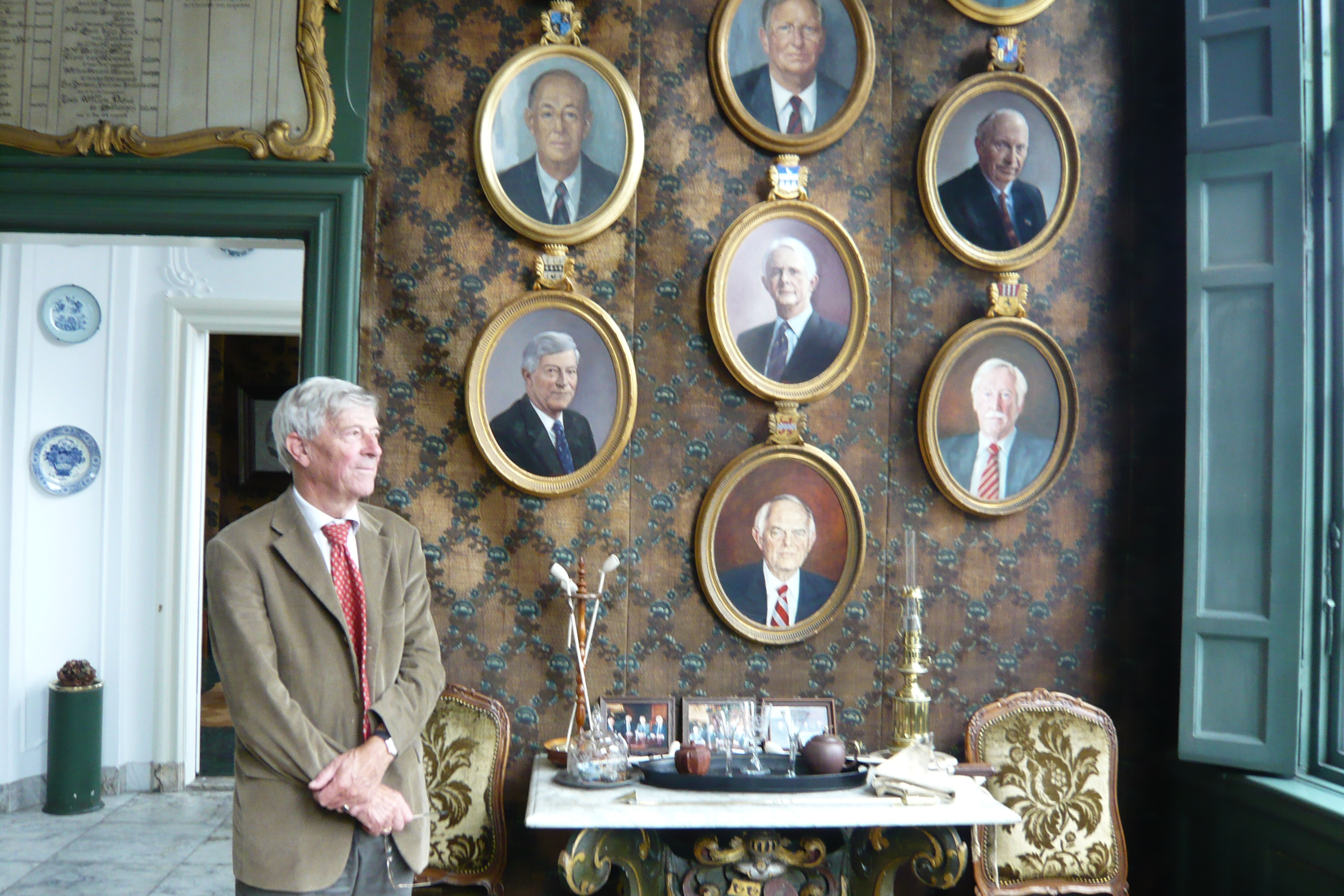
A regent of the hofje posing next to his portrait in the regent's room of the nearby Hofje van Noblet

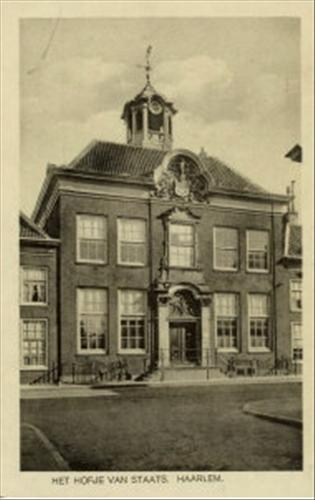
Gate of the Hofje van Staats in 1925

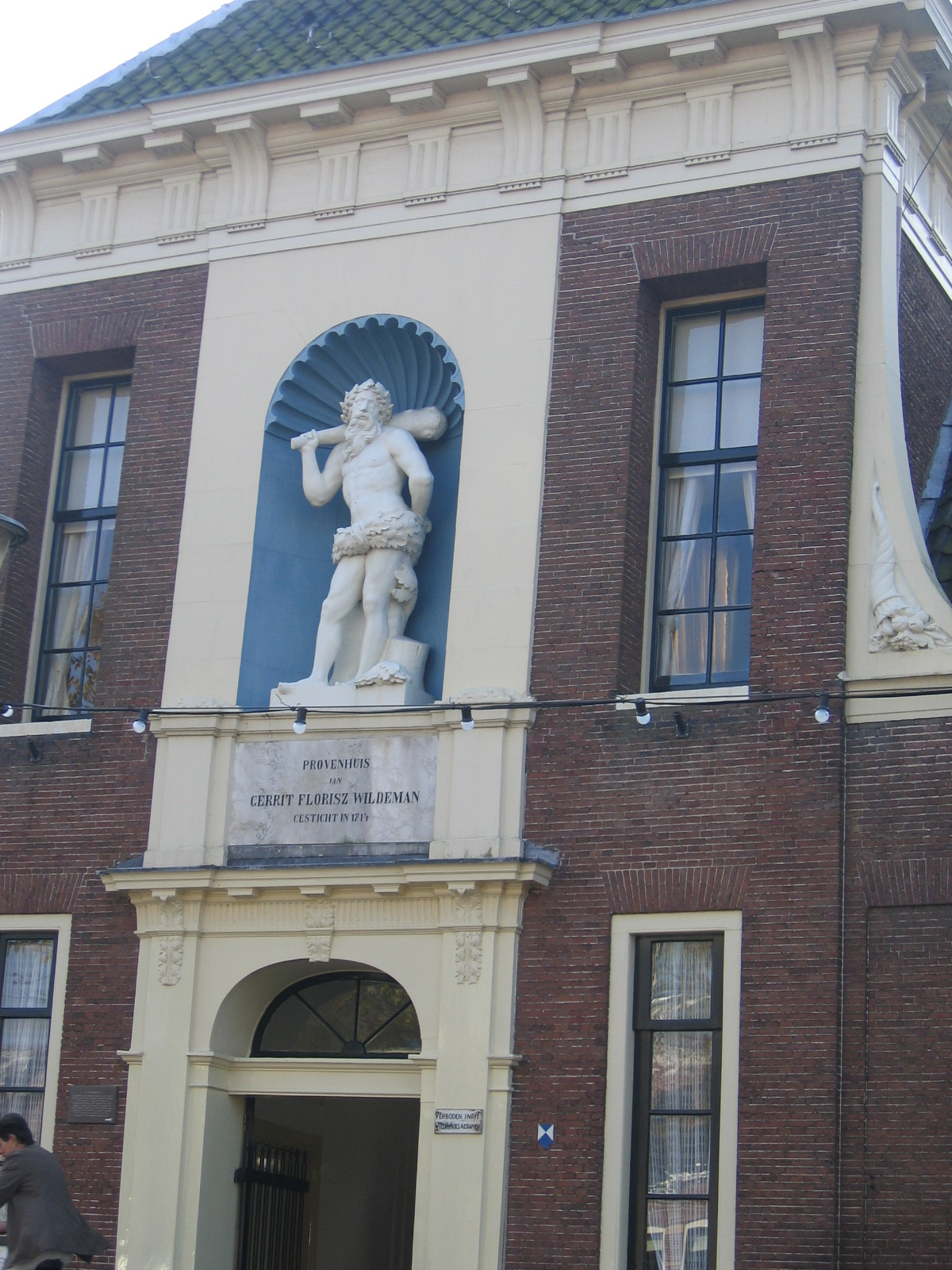
Gate of the Wildemanshofje in Alkmaar that the architect Kleijn visited before building the Hofje van Staats.

It was built from July 29, 1730, to 1733 from the legacy of the Haarlem thread-seller Ysbrand Staats. He left his entire legacy to the poor, and his brother took charge of building this hofje after he died. The first hofje to be built in the 18th century, the executors visited Alkmaar under the leadership of architect Abraham Kleijn, to visit the "new style hofje" Wildemans. In former times hofjes were built in the back gardens of larger homes of the wealthy donors. In 1730 the new style hofjes were luxurious complexes with fancy gateway buildings directly on the street. The original gateway house of this hofje still stands, but no longer functions as the home of a governing regent, but as a storefront. It is certainly grander than the Wildeman's hofje, but was itself surpassed as the fanciest hofje in Haarlem by the Teylers Hofje.

== Residents ==
The hofje was designed to be grand, because it was meant for women of the Dutch Reformed faith, at that time the official faith of the Haarlem council. According to the original hofje rules and regulations, the women eligible to live there were not very poor, because they had to buy their place for 50 florins and bring a long list of possessions with them, including clothing and furnishings. It originally had houses for 29 single elder women, after the renovation in 1990 this was reduced to 20.

== Finances ==
The hofje was quite wealthy, and in 1783 celebrated its 50-year jubilee with a glass for the regents engraved with the portrait of Ysbrand Staats. According to the period history of Haarlem by Pieter Langendijk, the hofje had bleaching fields behind the easternmost cottages and a pavilion on the Spaarne river for the ladies to drink tea in. During the French occupation the finances took a turn for the worse and that land was sold. An original drawing of the complete hofje complex from the Jansweg to the Spaarne hangs in the Hofje van Noblet, whose finances are also managed by the same "Foundation for the preservation of the Hofjes Staats and Noblet".

Address: Jansweg 39
