= Tako Hajo Jelgersma =

Dutch painter

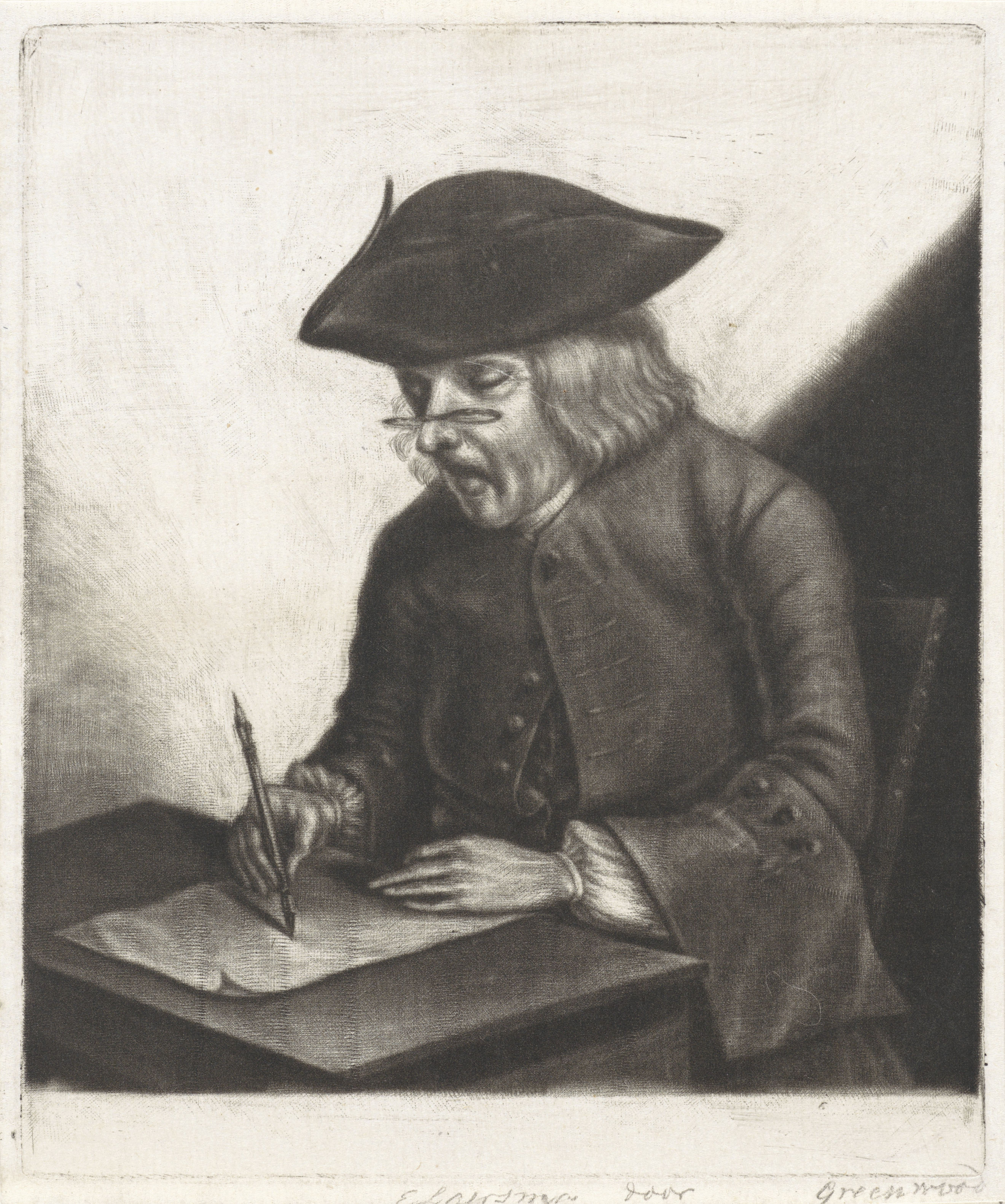
Portrait of Tako Hajo Jelgersma at work, by John Greenwood

Tako Hajo Jelgersma (October 29, 1702 – March 24, 1795) was an 18th-century Dutch painter.

== Biography ==
He was born in Harlingen. According to the RKD-Nederlands Instituut voor Kunstgeschiedenis, Jelgersma moved to Haarlem in 1752. He was the pupil of Frans Decker and Wigerus Vitringa. He painted landscapes, portraits, and copies of old masters. His grisailles followed the manner of Jacob de Wit. His pupils were Johan Bernard Brandhoff, Johannes Petrus van Horstok, Cornelis van Noorde, Martinus van der Jagt, and Johannes Swertner. He lived to a great age.

His pupil Cornelis van Noorde made many engravings after portraits that Jelgersma made. Often these are the only surviving portraits of these people today.

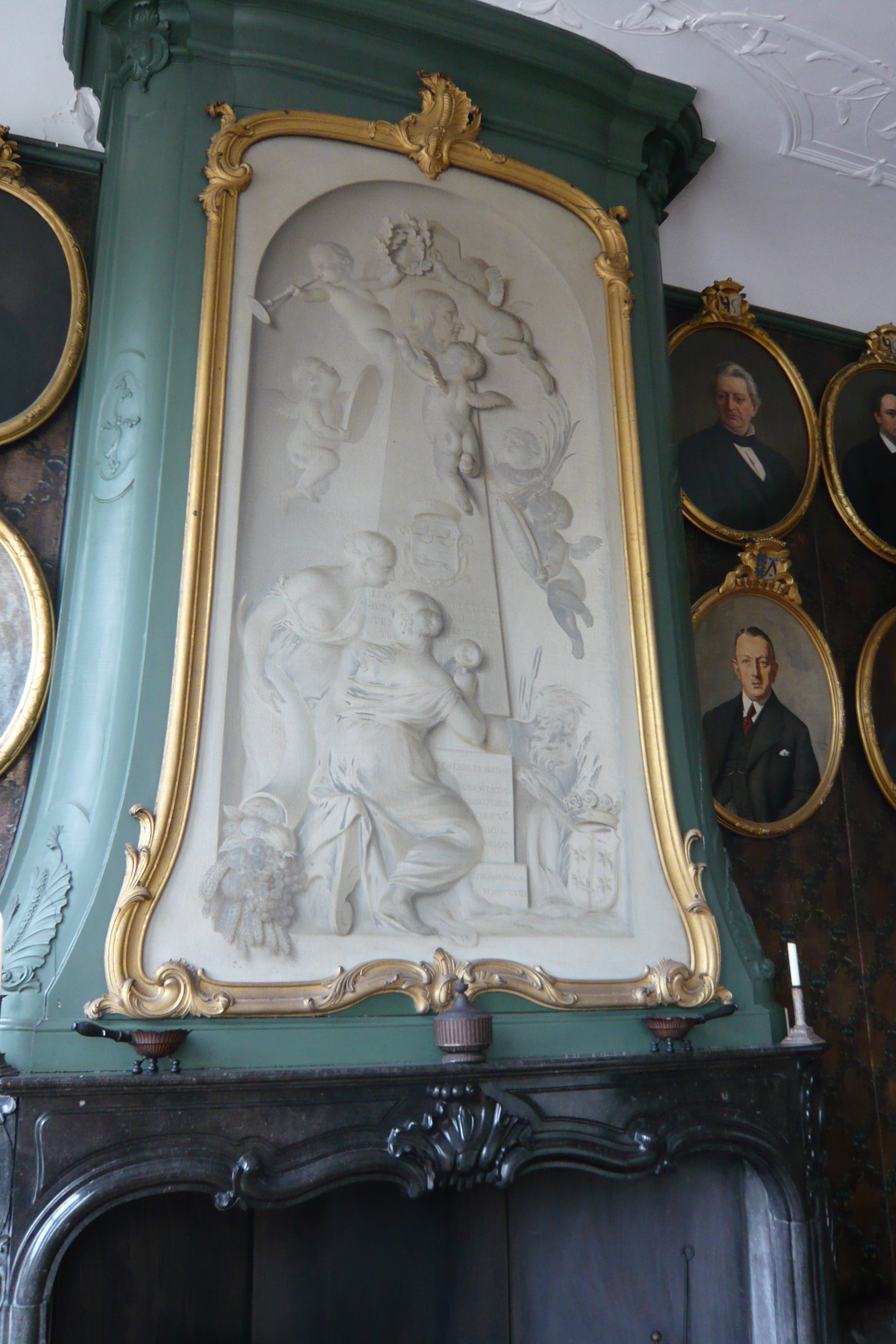
Over the mantel grisaille for the Hofje van Noblet painted in 1763

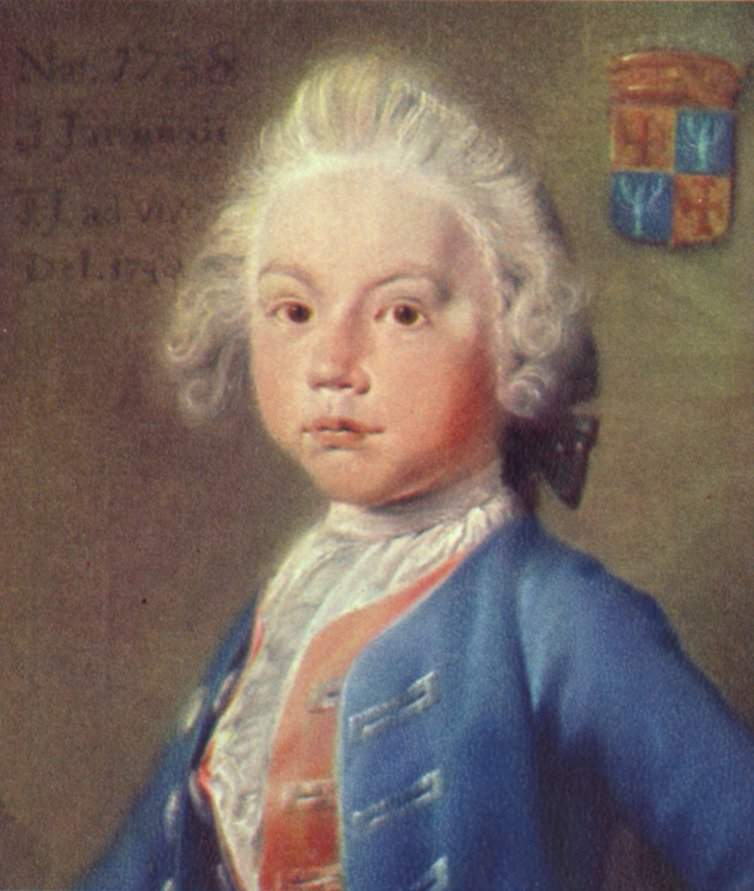
Portrait of Hendrik Fabricius, aged 10, 1748
