= Cornelis van Noorde =

Dutch painter

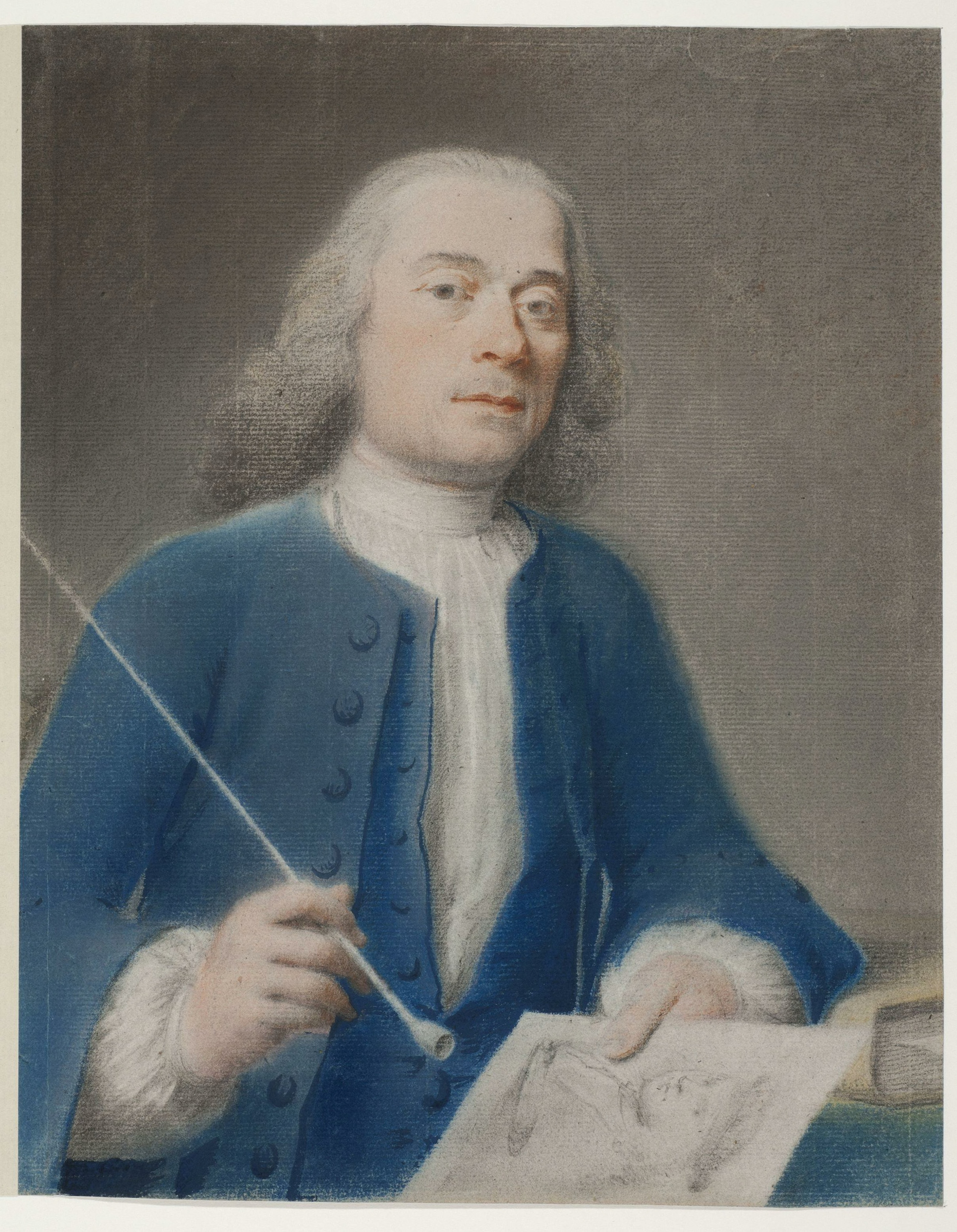
Self-portrait

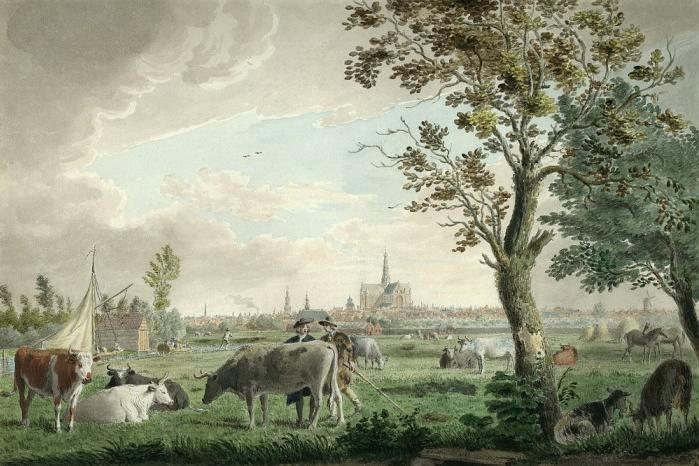
View of Haarlem from the Brouwersvaart, 1767

Cornelis van Noorde (1731 – 1795) was an 18th-century landscape painter and drawer from the Dutch Republic.

== Biography ==
He was born in 1731, in Haarlem. According to the Netherlands Institute for Art History, he was the son of Rijkes van Noorde and Josina van de Berg, who ran a bakery on the corner of the Kleine Houtstraat and the Patientiestraat. He was the pupil of Frans Decker, and after he died in 1751, Tako Hajo Jelgersma. He was still living at home when his father died in 1753. His mother continued the bakery until she died in 1761, the same year Cornelis became a member of the Haarlem Guild of St. Luke. His brother Jacob took over the bakery, and Cornelis moved out with his sister to a house on the Schagelstraat. His sister got married in 1765, and Cornelis moved to a house on the Oude Gracht that he had inherited from his uncle Cornelis van der Berg, who had also been a pupil of Frans Decker and who had kept a small atelier in his house. Cornelis lived there until he married in 1783 to the sister of the man his sister had married; Catharina van Seelen. Since by that time they were both getting on in age, the marriage remained childless.

He was a teacher and director of the Haarlemse Teekenacademie, which he helped found in De Hulst, the home of Pieter Teyler van der Hulst in the Damstraat in Haarlem, in 1772 along with Jelgersma, Hendrik Meijer, Christiaan Henning, Leendert Overbeek and Paul van Liender. The academy moved in 1775 further up in the Damstraat to what is now known as the Fundatiehuis, but after Pieter Teyler died in 1778 they had to make way for Vincent Jansz van der Vinne who was appointed curator of art by the new Teylers Stichting. They then moved again, to the Hof van Holland in the Warmoesstraat in 1781. When Van der Vinne left Teylers Stichting, they asked Cornelis to take his place, but he refused and they hired Wybrand Hendriks instead. Cornelis seemed to have kept up the academy somewhat on his own, because three weeks after he died it was dissolved in 1795.

He died on 16 October 1795, in Haarlem, though the cause of death is not recorded.

His pupils were Augustijn Claterbos, Warnaar Horstink, and Johannes Swertner. Though he is known for copies of old masters, vignettes (for the printer Johannes Enschedé and his son), portraits and pastoral landscapes, his work is most appreciated for his detailed drawings of architectural works that have since disappeared from the landscape altogether. His sketch book is in the collection of the North Holland archives and has been published as an important historical document.

The North Holland Archives and Teylers Museum hold drawings, water colors, etchings, engravings, and charcoal sketches by van Noorde, who produced across a wide range of subjects and locations. The archives holdings include his topographical drawings of buildings before and after their demolition.
