= Paulus van Liender =

Dutch painter

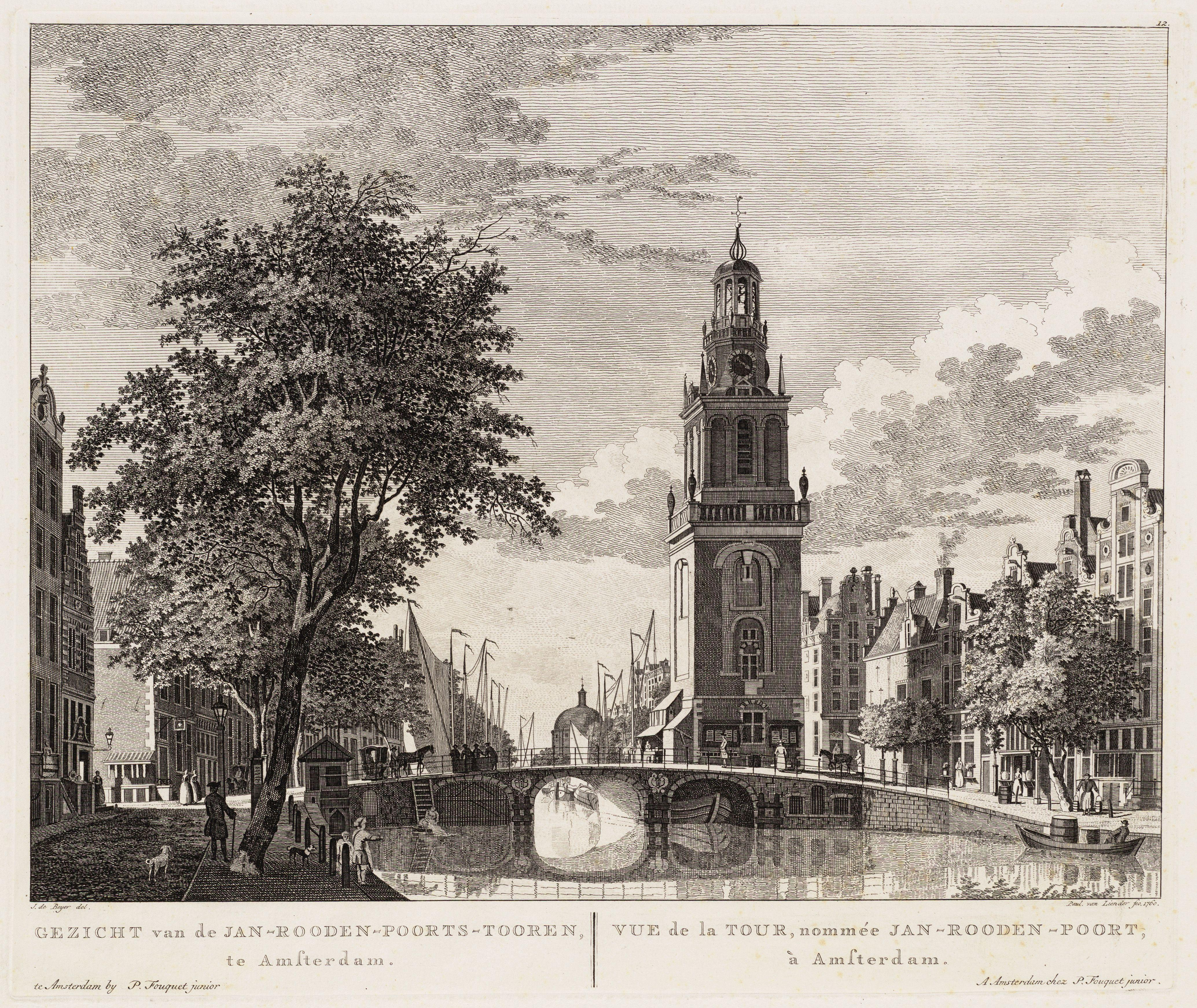
Jan Rodenpoortstoren, Amsterdam, 1760

Paulus van Liender (1731–1797) was an 18th-century landscape painter and draughtsman from the Dutch Republic.

== Biography ==
He was born in Utrecht. According to the RKD he was a pupil of Cornelis Pronk, and the nephew of Jacob van Liender and the brother of Pieter van Liender. He was a board member of the Haarlem Tekenacademie set up in the home of Pieter Teyler van der Hulst, and in 1774 he became steller van het model, which meant he was allowed to direct the live model to assume various positions during drawing sessions of the academy. He worked with the landscape painter Jan de Beijer. His pupils were Franciscus Andreas Milatz, Hermanus Petrus Schouten, and Jacob Elias van Varelen. Whereas his drawings were initially purely topographical, and easily to be confused with those of his brother, he later developed a more romantic style, focusing on ruins and eventually mainly on large forest trees. Liender died in Haarlem in 1797.

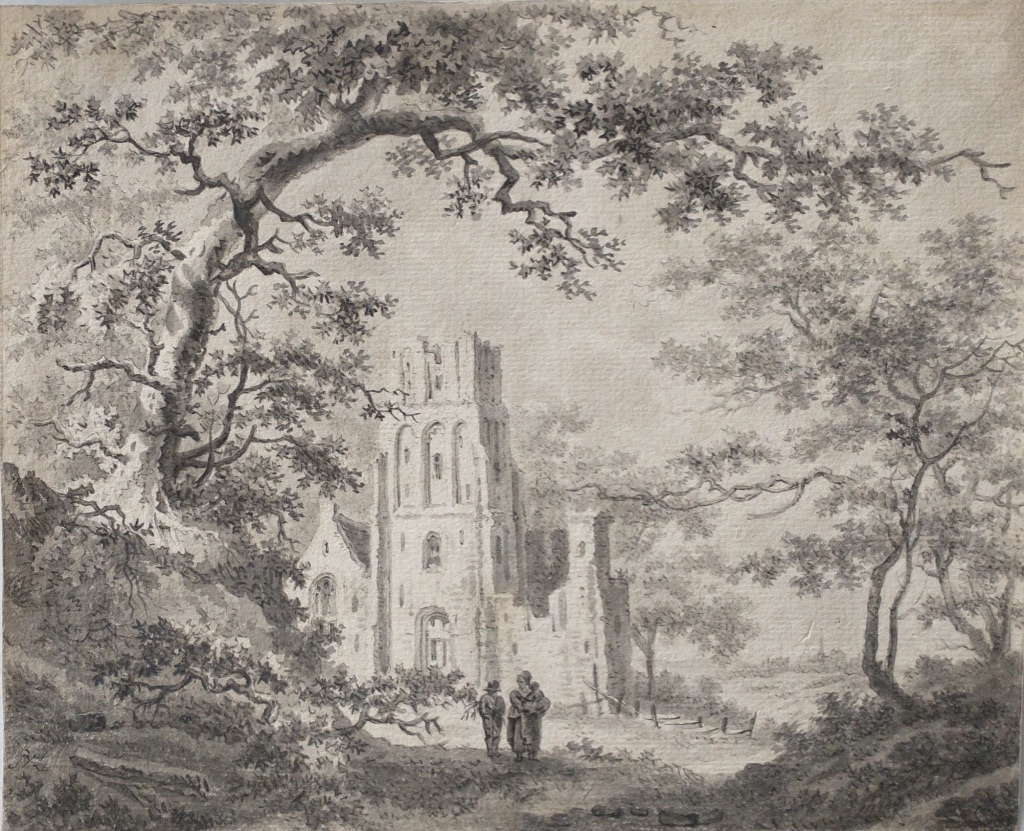
Church ruins in a forest
