= Frans Decker =

18th-century painter

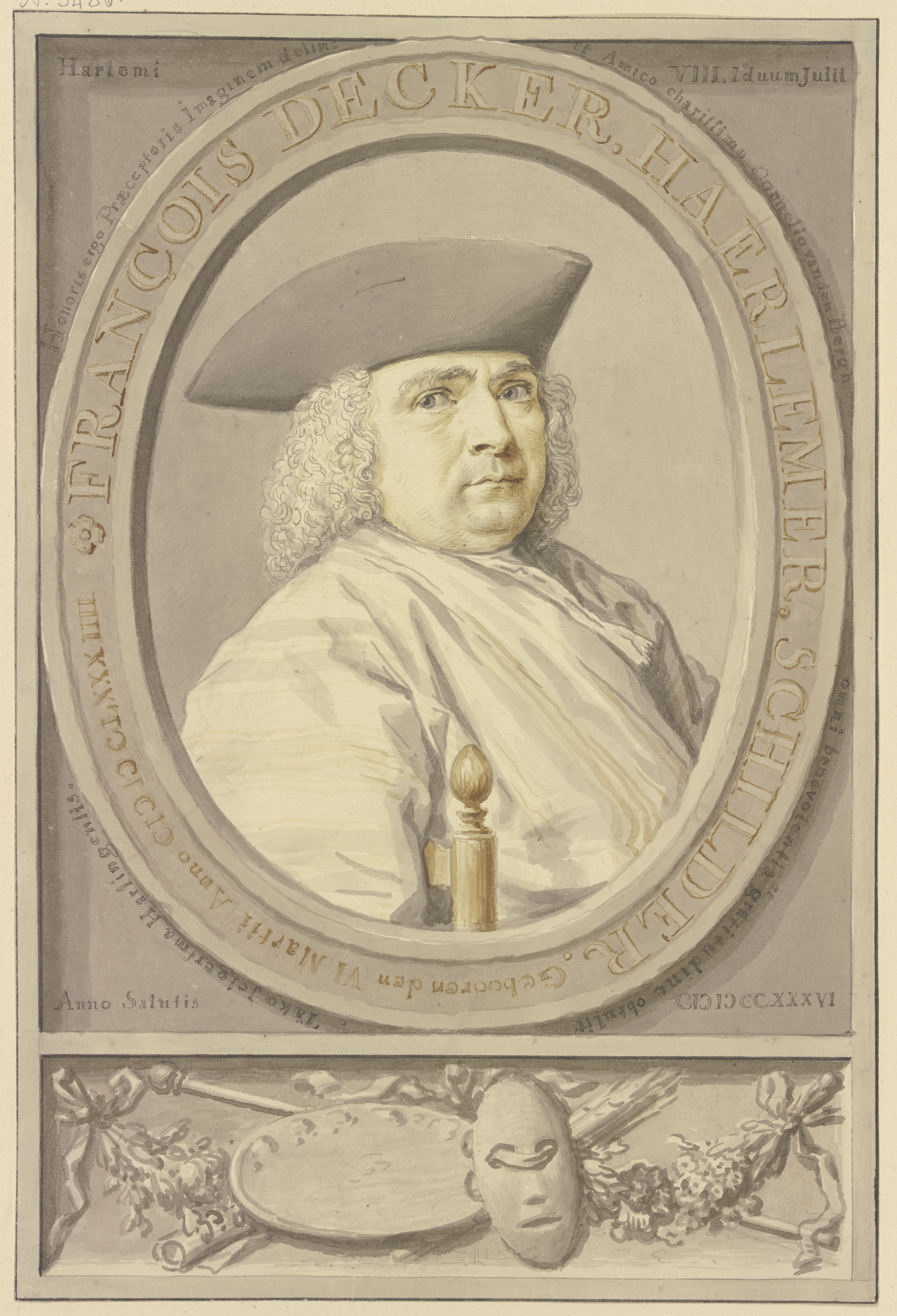
François Decker

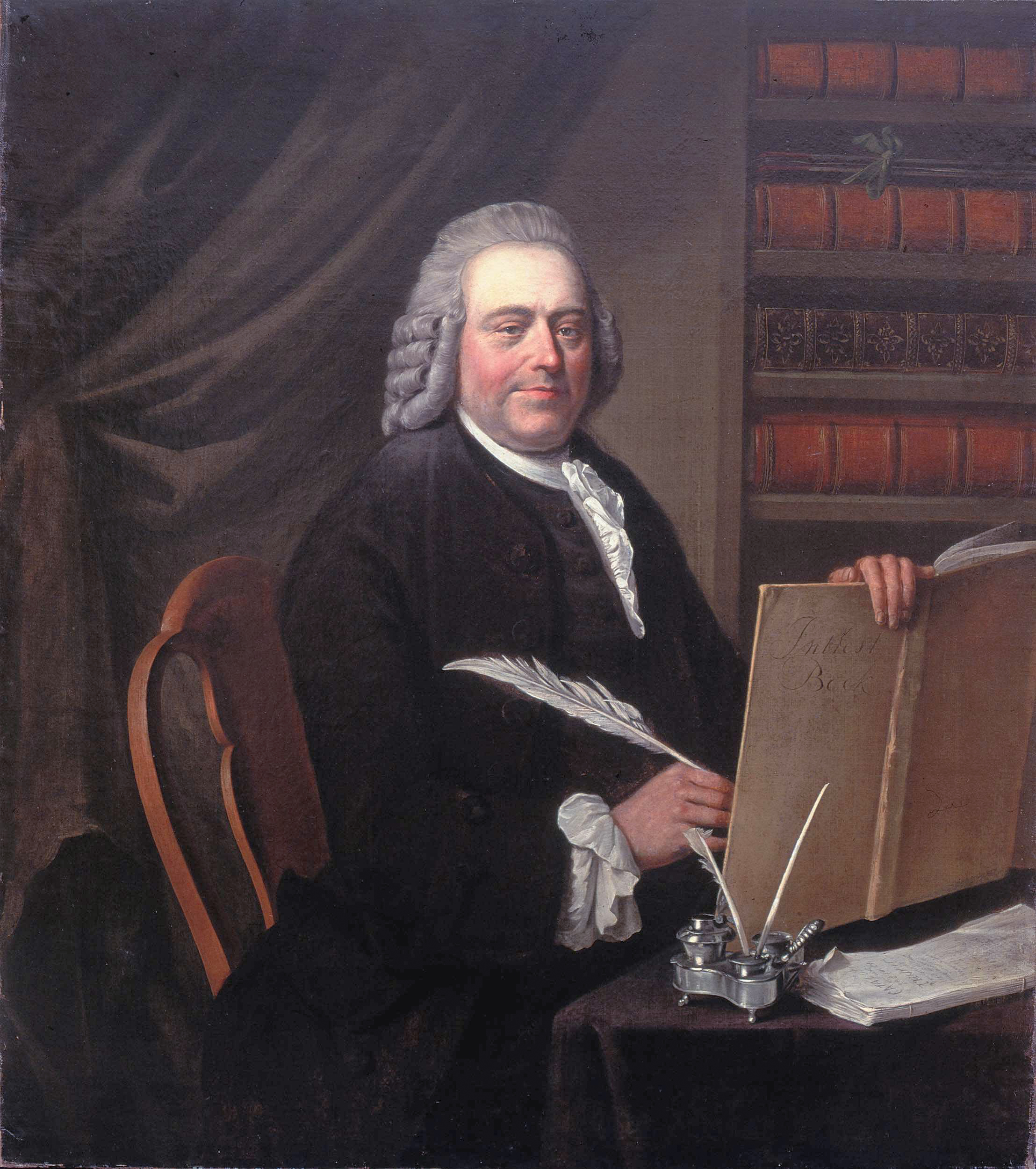
Portrait of Pieter Teyler van der Hulst, painted posthumously in 1787 by Wybrand Hendriks after a portrait by Decker, now lost

Frans Decker (1684–1751) was an 18th-century painter from the Dutch Republic.

== Biography ==
Decker is stated to have been born at Haarlem in 1684, and to have died at the same place in 1751, having been a pupil of Romeyn De Hooghe and of Bartholomeus Engels. He painted landscapes in a very pleasing and natural style, resembling the charming productions of Ruisdael, but without the servility of an imitator. He also excelled in caricature.

He was a member of the Haarlem Guild of St. Luke from 1706 until his death. His pupils were Cornelis van den Berg, Tako Hajo Jelgersma, and Cornelis van Noorde. His portrait was engraved by his pupil Jelgersma.
