= Antonie Frederik Zürcher =

Dutch painter (1825–1876)

- Born: 2 January 1825; Nieuwer-Amstel
- Died: 15 April 1876 (aged 51); Maastricht

Antonie Frederik Zürcher (2 January 1825 – 15 April 1876) was a Dutch painter, draughtsman, etcher and art teacher.

Zürcher was born in Nieuwer-Amstel as the oldest son of Johannes Cornelis Zurcher in a family of artists. After his formal training in Amsterdam he became a drawing teacher at the academy there. He married in Amsterdam in 1850 and the couple had 14 children, including the painter Johannes Wilhelm Cornelis Zurcher. After his school was closed he was reassigned a position in Maastricht, where he later died. His younger brother Frederik Willem Zürcher was also a painter.
