= Research history of Mosasaurus =

Studies of an extinct aquatic reptile

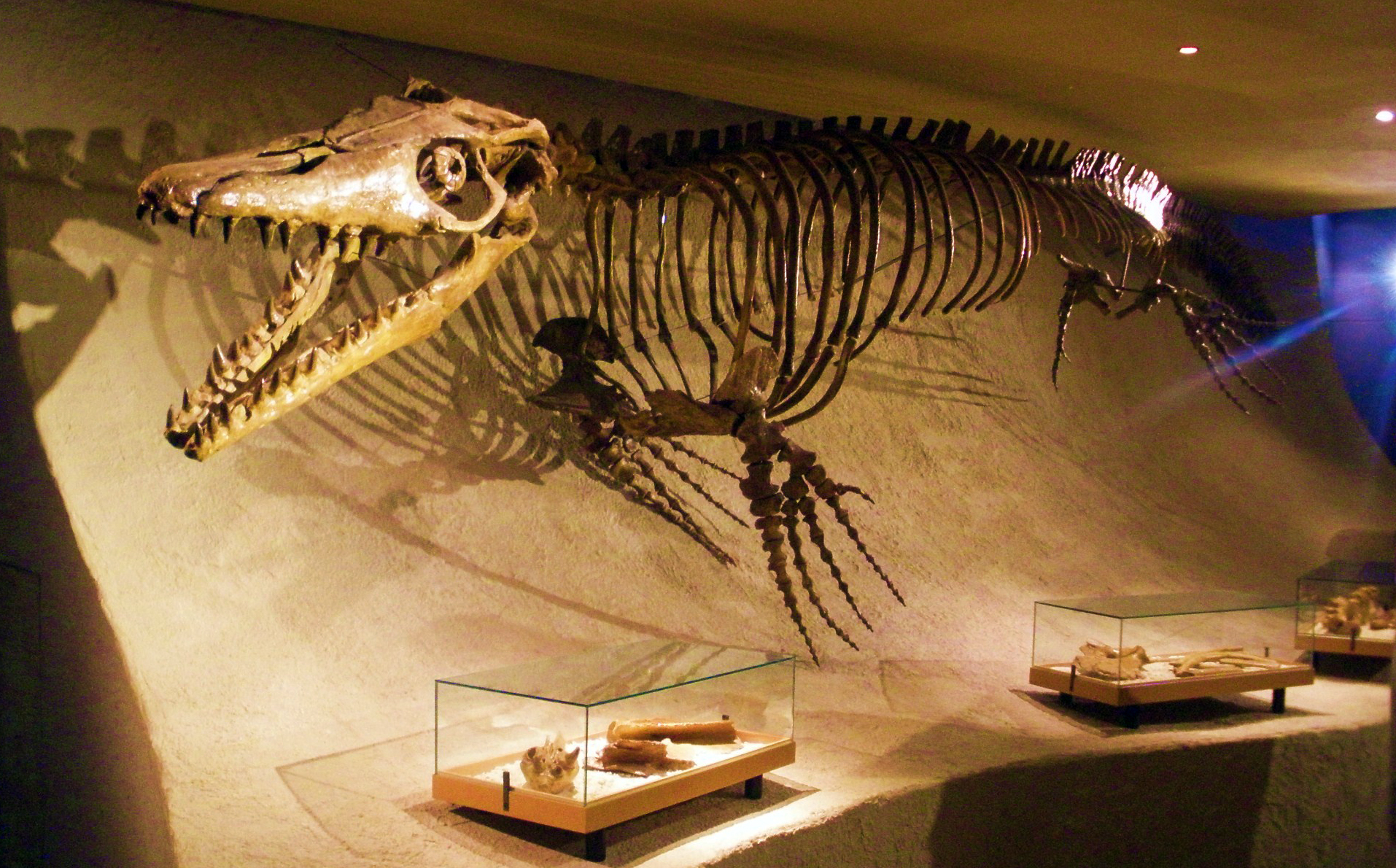
Reconstructed skeleton of M. hoffmannii at the Maastricht Natural History Museum

The research history of Mosasaurus is extensive given its complicated taxonomic and cultural histories, with the earliest recorded fossil find dating back to 1764 in a chalk quarry located near Maastricht, Netherlands. A second, slightly more complete specimen, discovered in 1778 in the same locality, was captured by the French army after the siege of Maastricht in 1794, before being delivered to the French National Museum of Natural History in Paris the following year. Initially considered as fossils coming from crocodiles or whales, it was from 1800 that Adriaan Gilles Camper identified them as coming from a large marine reptile sharing affinities with monitor lizards, conclusions shared by Georges Cuvier in a 1808 study. This identification reinforces Cuvier in his conception of the notion of extinction which then appeared at this time. Long known as the “great animal of Maastricht”, it's in 1822 that William Conybeare proposed naming the new taxon as Mosasaurus in reference to its origin in fossil deposits near the Meuse River. The genus name, although later approved by Cuvier himself, remained without a specific epithet until 1829, from which a certain number of proposals appeared; later consensus suggesting the using of the name M. hoffmannii as first erected by Gideon Mantell, as well the designation of the second skull as the type specimen of this species.

After the true nature of the fossils was proven by Camper Jr. and Cuvier, many authors initially described the animal as a semi-aquatic marine reptile using webbed feet for walking, a view based after the misinterpretation of some bones. In 1854, Hermann Schlegel discovered that the animal had in fact flippers entirely made for the marine environment. His findings remained largely ignored until more complete North American mosasaur fossils were discovered during the 1870s. Historically, the type species M. hoffmannii was described via unclear diagnosis, leading the genus to become a wastebasket taxon containing up to fifty different species. A new description of the type specimen published in 2017 helps resolve the taxonomic problem and confirms that at least four other species belong to the genus, namely M. missouriensis, M. conodon, M. lemonnieri and M. beaugei. Another five species still nominally classified within the genus are planned to be reassessed.

== First discoveries ==
=== First skull ===
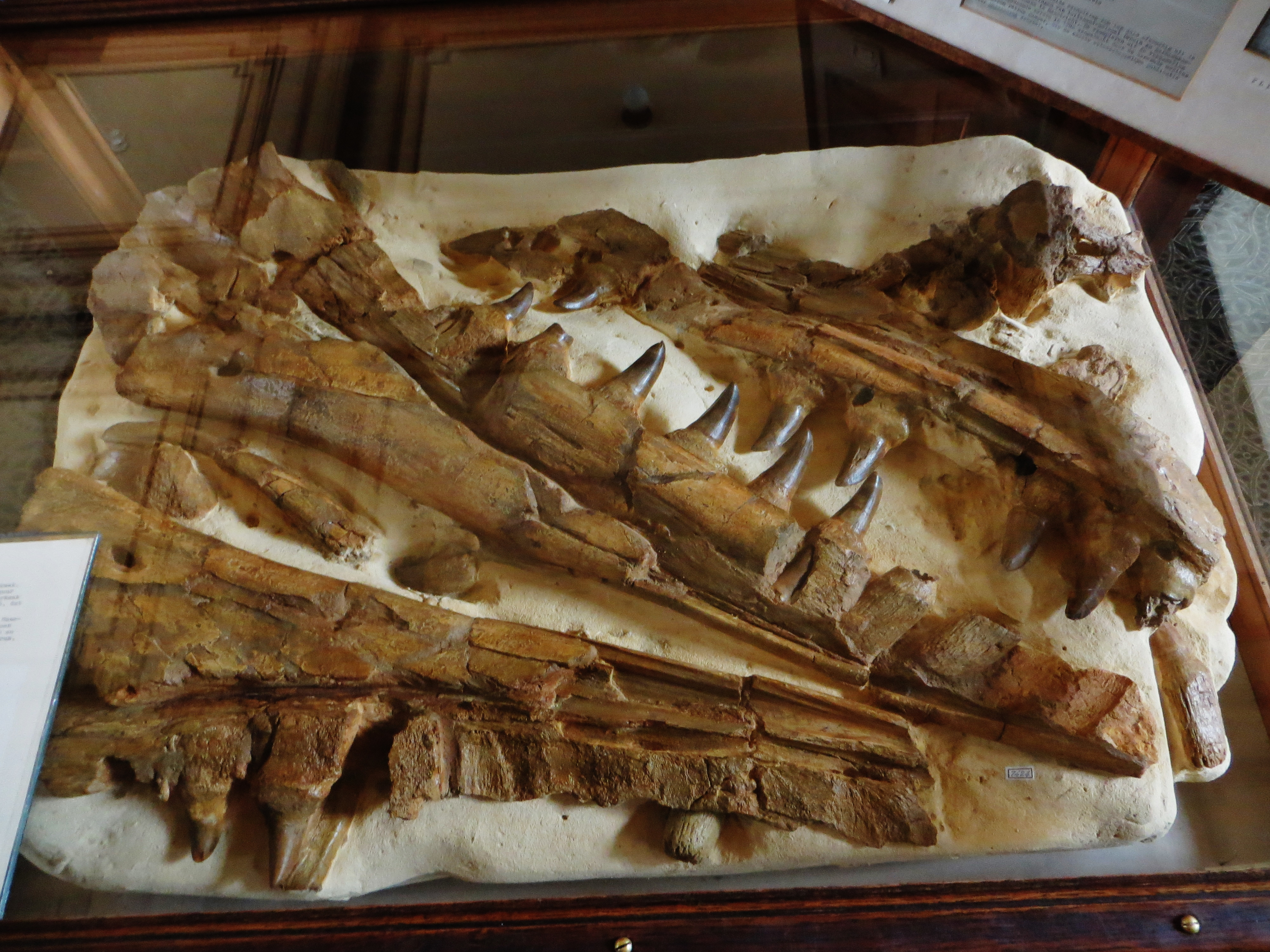
TM 7424, the first known specimen of M. hoffmannii

The first remains of Mosasaurus known to science are fragments of a skull discovered in 1764 at a subterranean chalk quarry under Mount Saint Peter, a hill near Maastricht, the Netherlands. It was collected by the French army Lieutenant Jean Baptiste Drouin in 1766 and was procured in 1784 by museum director Martinus van Marum for the Teylers Museum at Haarlem. In 1790, Van Marum published a description of the fossil, considering it to be a species of "big breathing fish" (in other words, a whale) under the classification Pisces cetacei. This skull is still in the museum's collections and is cataloged as TM 7424.

=== Second skull and historical capture ===
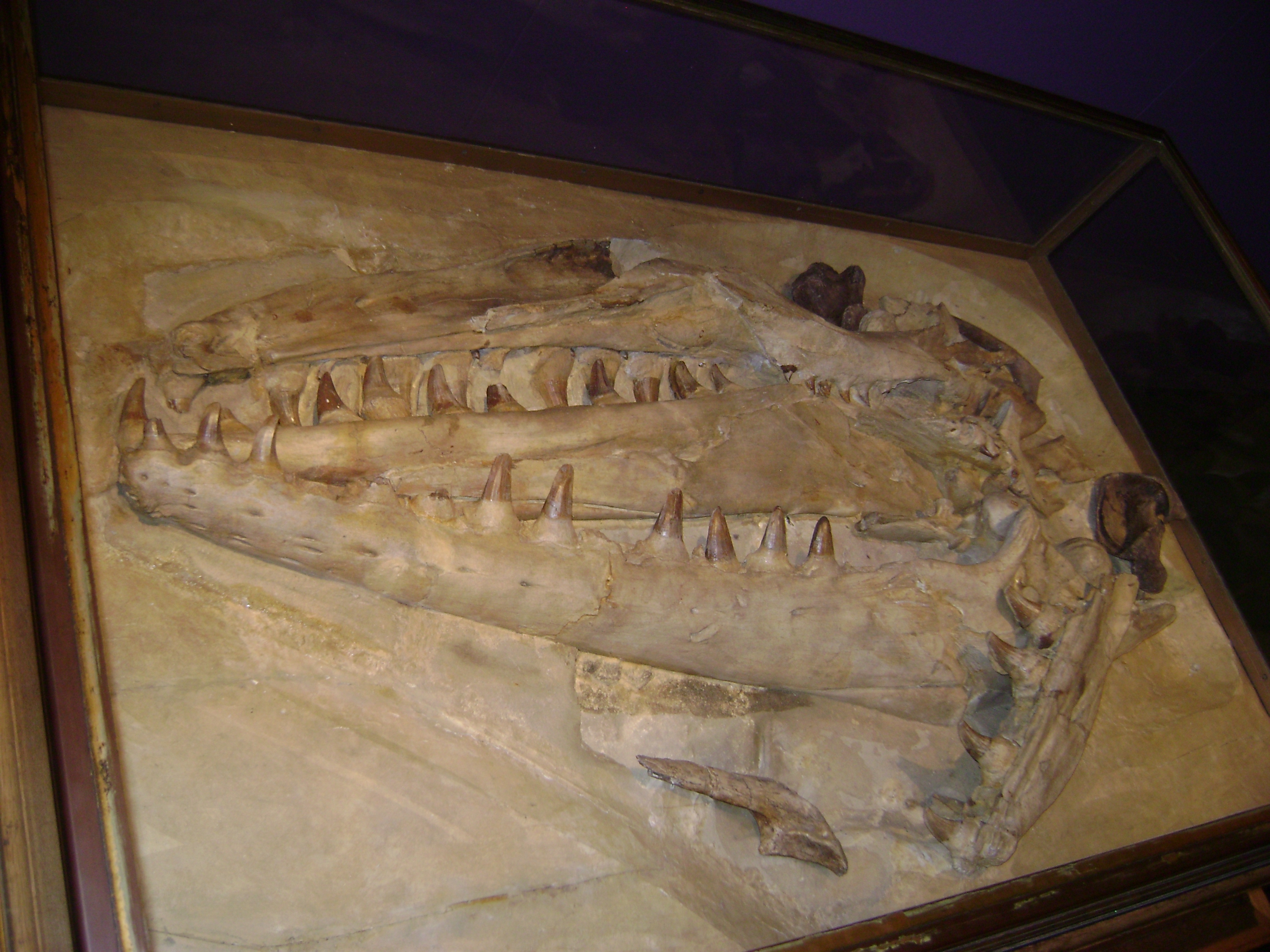
MNHN AC 9648, the second skull and holotype of M. hoffmannii, which was historically nicknamed as the "great animal of Maastricht"

In 1778, (Note: The exact year had previously not been fully certain due to multiple contradicting claims. An examination of existing historical evidence conducted in 2012 by the Dutch historian Florence F. J. M. Pieters and colleagues suggests that the most precise date would be around 1780. More recently, Limburg newspapers reported in 2015 that the Dutch historian Ernst Homburg discovered a Liège magazine from the time reporting in detail the discovery of the second skull in October 1778.) a second more complete skull was discovered at the same quarry. The retired Dutch army physician named Johann Leonard Hoffmann took a keen interest in this specimen, who corresponded with the famous compatriot biologist Petrus Camper regarding its identification. Hoffmann, who had previously collected various mosasaur bones in the 1770s, the most complete of which a left lower jaw, presumed that the animal was a crocodile. He even intended to publish a treatise about the jaw but was dissuaded by Camper who, by showing Hoffmann a crocodile jaw to demonstrate its dissimilarity with the mosasaur one, wished to spare him the embarrassment of publicly retracting his initial opinion. The second skull, as the Teyler Museum's one, were first figured by the French naturalist Pierre-Joseph Buc'hoz in a 1782 work, in which he described them as representing the same lineage of an unknown animal. This same work represents the very first published scientific documentation about Mosasaurus, although the figures shown are upside down due to the lithographic process. In 1786, Camper concluded that the remains belonged to an "unknown species of toothed whale". He published his studies that year in the Philosophical Transactions of the Royal Society of London, the most prestigious scientific journal in the world at the time, giving the second skull international fame. During this time, the fossil was under the possession of canon Theodorus Joannes Godding, who owned the portion of the land it was discovered in. Godding was struck by its beauty and took every measure to conserve it, eventually displaying it to the public inside a grotto behind his house. This same cave would most likely correspond to a closed room of the "Old Entrance", which has since collapsed in 1916.

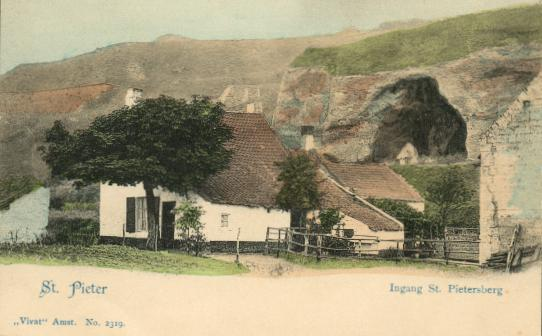
1905 postcard illustration of the "Old Entrance", a cave in which the second specimen would have been displayed before its capture by the French army in 1794

Maastricht, an important Dutch fortress city at the time, was captured during the French Revolutionary Wars by the armies of General Jean-Baptiste Kléber in November 1794. Four days after the conquest, the fossil was looted from Godding's possession by French soldiers due to its international scientific value under Kléber's orders, carried out by political commissar Augustin-Lucie de Frécine. According to an account by Godding's niece and heiress Rosa, Frécine first pretended to be interested in studying the famous remains and corresponded with Godding via letter to arrange a visit to his cottage to personally examine it. Frécine never visited, and instead sent six armed soldiers to forcefully confiscate the fossil under the pretext that he was ill and wanted to study it at his home. Four days after the seizure, the National Convention decreed that the specimen was to be transported to the National Museum of Natural History, France (MNHN). By the time it arrived at the museum, various parts of the skull were lost. In an 1816 reclamation request, Rosa claimed that she still possessed two missing parts that were not taken by Frécine. However, the fate of these bones is unknown, and some historians believe that Rosa mentioned them in hopes of negotiating indemnity. The French government refused to return the fossil but recompensed Godding in 1827 by exempting him from war taxes.

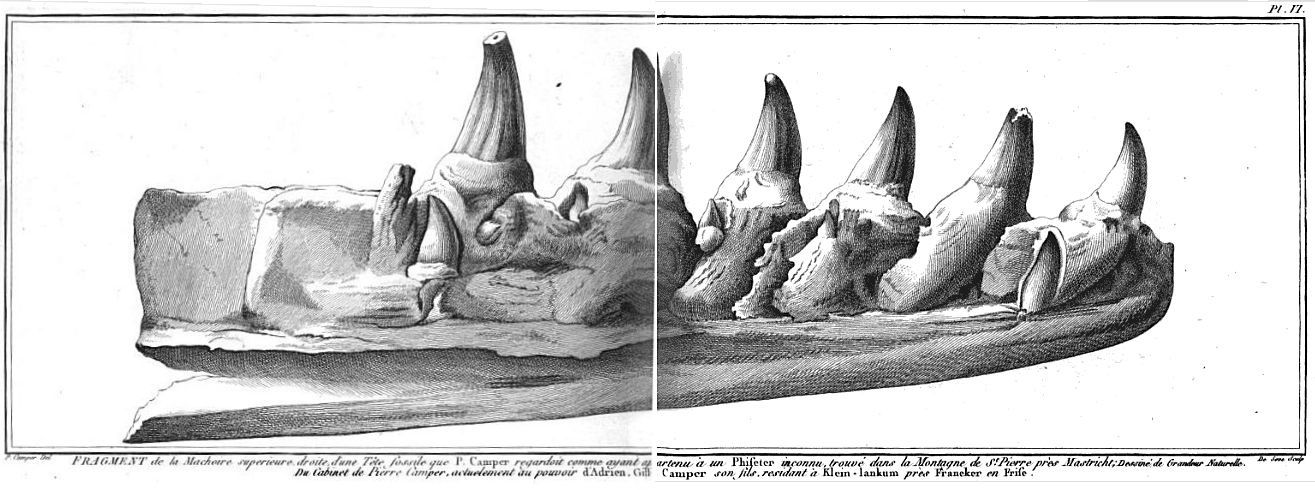
The left lower jaw acquired by Hoffmann, erroneously identified as right upper jaw by Faujas

When the second specimen was finally incorporated into the Paris Museum, it was first exhibited in the Gallery of Mineralogy and Geology. As the chair of palaeontology did not yet exist at the time (it was only created in 1853), the vertebrate fossils housed in this gallery were placed under the authority of the chair of animals, which had become the chair of comparative anatomy in 1802 under the French naturalist Georges Cuvier. It is for this precise reason that the second skull has since been numbered as MNHN AC 9648. Despite its notoriety, the specimen was not displayed when the museum’s first paleontological gallery opened in 1885, where only around thirty fossils were exhibited. It was only with the inauguration of the Gallery of Paleontology and Comparative Anatomy in 1898 that it was finally placed on public display, where it remains today. In 2009, the MNHN temporarily loaned the specimen to the Maastricht Natural History Museum as part of an event entitled Darwin, Cuvier and the Great Animal of Maestricht.

=== Cultural legend concerning second skull ===
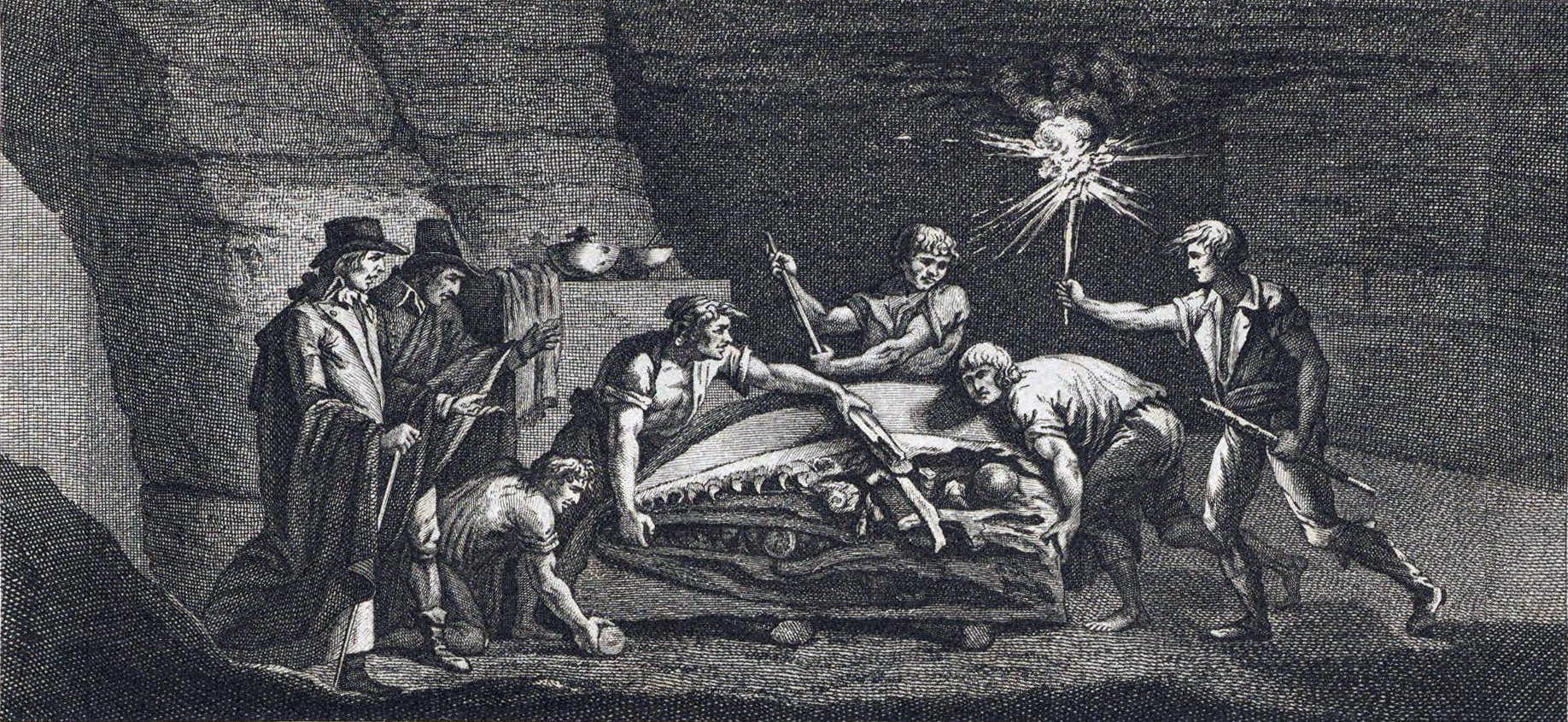
Faujas' romantic but inaccurate 1799 interpretation of the second skull's discovery. The second character from the left in the picture may represent Hoffmann

There is a popular legend regarding Godding's ownership of the second skull and its subsequent acquisition by the French, which is based on the account of geologist Barthélemy Faujas de Saint-Fond (one of four men that arrived in Maastricht in January 1795 to confiscate any public objects of scientific value for France) in his 1799 publication Histoire naturelle de la montagne de Saint-Pierre de Maestricht (Natural history of the mountain of Saint-Pierre of Maastricht). According to Faujas, Hoffmann was the original owner of the specimen, which he purchased from the quarrymen and helped excavate. When the news of this discovery reached Godding, whom Faujas painted as a malevolent figure, he sought to take possession of the greatly valuable specimen for himself and filed a lawsuit against Hoffmann, claiming his rights as landowner. Due to Godding's position as a canon, he influenced the courts and was able to force Hoffmann to relinquish the fossil and pay the costs of the lawsuit. When Maastricht was attacked by the French, the artillerymen were aware that the famous fossil was stored at Godding's house. Godding did not know his house was spared and he hid the specimen in a secret location in town. After the city's capture, Faujas personally helped secure the fossil while Frécine offered a reward of 600 bottles of good wine to anyone who would locate and bring to him the skull undamaged. The next day, twelve grenadiers brought the fossil safely to Frécine after assuring full compensation to Godding and collected their promised reward.

Historians have found little evidence to back up Faujas' account. For example, there is no evidence that Hoffmann ever possessed the fossil, that a lawsuit involved him and Godding, or that Faujas was directly involved in acquiring the fossil. More reliable but contradictory accounts suggest that his narrative was mostly made up: Faujas was known to be a notorious liar who commonly embellished his stories, and it is likely that he falsified the story to disguise evidence of looting from a private owner (which was a war crime), to make a propaganda for the French army, or to simply impress others. Nevertheless, the legend created by Faujas' embellishment helped elevate the second skull into cultural fame.

=== Fate of the first skull ===
Unlike its renowned contemporary, the first skull TM 7424 was not seized by the French after the capture of Maastricht. During Faujas and his colleagues' mission in 1795, the collections of Teylers Museum at Haarlem, although famous, were protected from confiscation. The four men may have been instructed to protect all private collections unless its owner was declared a rebel. However, this protection may have also been due to Van Marum's acquaintance with Faujas and the botanist André Thouin (another of the four men) since their first meeting in Paris in July 1785.

== Identification ==
=== Early hypotheses as a crocodile or cetacean ===
Before the second skull was seized by the French in late 1794, the two most popular hypotheses regarding its identification were that it represented the remains of either a crocodile or whale, as first argued by Hoffmann and Camper respectively. Hoffmann's identification as a crocodile was viewed by many at the time to be the most obvious answer; there were no widespread ideas of evolution and extinction at the time, and the skull superficially resembled a crocodile. Moreover, among the various mosasaur bones Hoffmann collected in 1770 were phalanx bones which he assembled and placed onto a gypsum matrix. Historians have noted that this assembly would have distorted the view of some of the phalanges, creating an illusion that claws are present, which Hoffmann likely took as further evidence of a crocodile. Camper based his argument for a whale identity on four points. First, Camper noted that the skull's jawbones had a smooth texture and its teeth were solid at the root, similar to those in sperm whales and dissimilar to the crocodile's porous jawbones and hollow teeth. Second, Camper obtained mosasaur phalanges which he noted to be significantly different from those of crocodiles and instead suggested paddle-shaped limbs, which were another cetacean feature. Third, Camper noted the presence of teeth in the pterygoid bone of the skull, which he observed are not present in crocodiles but are present in many species of fish (Camper also thought that the rudimentary teeth of the sperm whale, which he erroneously believed was a species of fish, corresponded to pterygoid teeth). Lastly, Camper pointed out that all other fossils from Maastricht are marine, which indicates that the animal represented by the skull must have been a marine animal. Because he erroneously believed that crocodiles are entirely freshwater animals, Camper concluded by process of elimination that the animal could only be a whale.

=== Identification as an extinct marine lizard ===
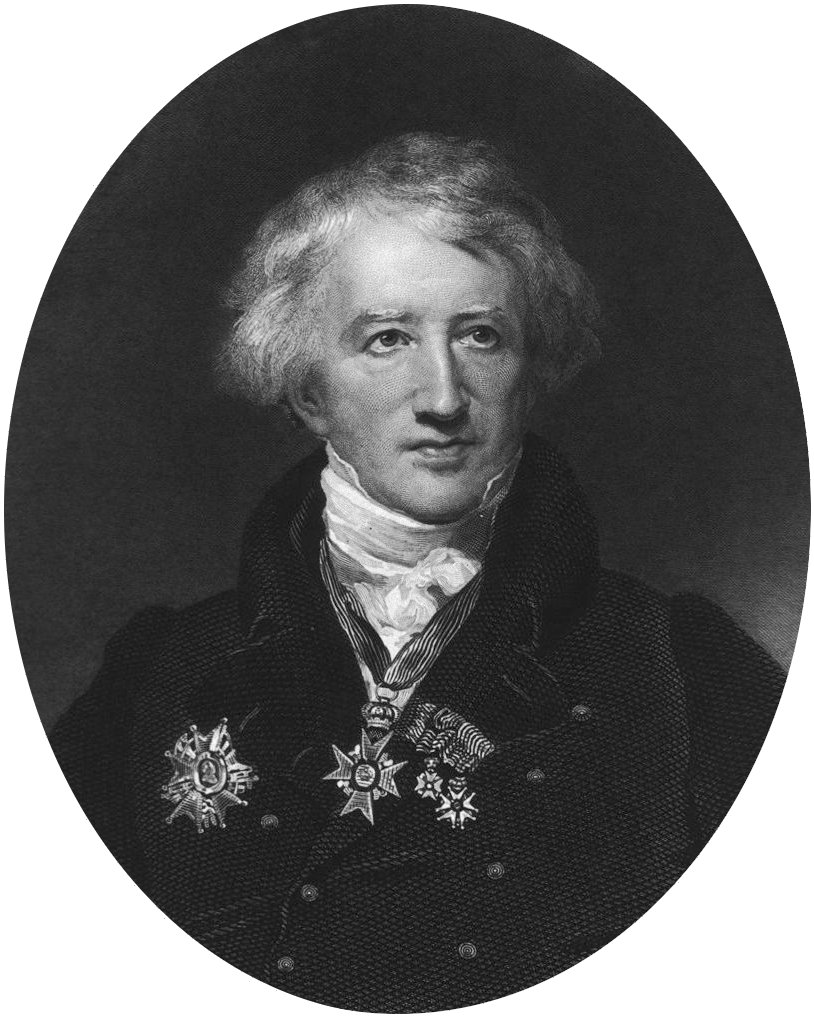
MNHN AC 9648 helped to shape Cuvier's concept of extinction

After the publication of Camper's 1786 study, the second skull attracted the attention of more scientists and was referred to as "the great fossil animal of the quarries of Maastricht", or more simply as the "great animal of Maastricht". One of the scientists was Camper's son Adriaan Gilles Camper. Originally intending to defend his father's arguments, Camper Jr. instead became the first to understand that the crocodile and cetacean hypotheses were both erroneous; based on his own examinations of the second specimen and fossils owned by his father, he found that their anatomical features were more similar to varanoids. Among the features used to justify his observation were, for example, the presence of chevrons on the caudal vertebrae, the type of tooth replacement, and the presence of teeth on the palate. Moreover, the simple fact that the mandible was composed of several bones instead of a single one immediately convinced Camper Jr. not to consider the animal as a whale, and instead to classify it among reptiles. Even before this skull was captured by the French army, Camper Jr. would have discussed his findings via letters he sent to Cuvier as early as 1790, but it was not until 1800 that he identified the animal as a large marine reptile showing close affinities to the previously mentioned group. (Note: Some sources cite the existence of several letters from Camper Jr. addressed to Cuvier about the specimen before 1800, but only his conversation from that precise year is clearly known.) Cuvier studied in his turn the second specimen, and he confirmed Camper Jr.'s identification of a large marine lizard in 1808, but as an extinct form unlike any today. The fossil had already become part of Cuvier's first speculations on the possibility of species going extinct, which paved the way for his theory of catastrophism or "consecutive creations", one of the predecessors of the theory of evolution. Prior to this, almost all fossils, when recognized as having come from once-living life forms, were interpreted as forms similar to those of the modern day. Cuvier's idea of the Maastricht specimen being a gigantic version of a modern animal unlike any species alive today seemed strange, even to him. The idea was so important to Cuvier that in 1812 he proclaimed:

Above all, the precise determination of the famous animal from Maastricht seems to us as important for the theory of zoological laws, as for the history of the globe.

— Georges Cuvier

Cuvier justified his concepts by trusting his techniques in the then-developing field of comparative anatomy, which he had already used to identify giant extinct members of other modern groups.

=== Naming ===
Even though the binomial naming system was well established at the time, Cuvier never designated a scientific name to the new species and for a while, it continued being referred to as the "great animal of Maastricht". The very first scientific name was proposed by the paleontologist Samuel Thomas von Sömmerring in 1816, in which he erected the species Lacerta gigantea on the basis of a skeleton of a marine reptile having been discovered in Bavaria, Germany, the author seeing it as a juvenile individual belonging to the same lineage as the specimen described by Cuvier. It would later turn out that this skeleton shared no affinity with the Maastricht specimen, being in fact a thalattosuchian which was later named Geosaurus by Cuvier in 1824. In 1822, English doctor James Parkinson published a conversation that included a suggestion made by Llandaff dean William Daniel Conybeare to refer to the species as the Mosasaurus as a temporary name until Cuvier decided on a permanent scientific name. Cuvier never made one; instead, he himself adopted Mosasaurus as the genus name in a volume dating from 1829 of his flagship work Le Règne Animal. The genus name came from the Latin Mosa "Meuse" and the Ancient Greek σαῦρος (saûros, "lizard"), all meaning "lizard of the Meuse", in reference to the river near which the fossils were discovered.

Still in 1829, two specific epithet are erected for the genus. English paleontologist Gideon Mantell adds the specific epithet hoffmannii, (Note: hoffmannii was the original spelling used by Mantell, ending with -ii. Later authors began to drop the final letter and spelled it as hoffmanni, as became the trend for specific epithets of similar structure in later years. However, recent scientists argue that the special etymological makeup of hoffmannii cannot be subjected to International Code of Zoological Nomenclature Articles 32.5, 33.4, or 34, which would normally protect similar respellings. This makes hoffmannii the valid spelling, although hoffmanni continues to be incorrectly used by many authors.) in honor of Hoffmann, when he describes vertebrae discovered in Sussex, England, judging them to be similar to those discovered in Maastricht. However, as the skull since residing in Paris is not mentioned, the holotype of this species would therefore logically correspond to the vertebrae described by Mantell. German paleontologist Friedrich Holl erects the specific epithet belgicus for the second skull, an inappropriate name given the real provenance of the specimen. In 1832, its compatriot Christian Erich Hermann von Meyer established the species M. camperi and synonymized it to M. hoffmannii and Lacerta gigantea, although ignoring M. belgicus. In an attempt to resolve this nomenclatural problem, English paleontologist Edward Charlesworth in 1845 erected the species M. steneodon to include fossils discovered in England, while retaining the name M. hoffmannii to include the Paris specimen, a view which was shared by Mantell himself in 1851. Using the specific epithet already proposed by Sömmering, American paleontologist Edward Drinker Cope erected the name M. giganteus in 1869, while synonymizing the taxa erected by Sömmering, Mantell, Holl and von Meyer. Thus, the specific names hoffmannii, camperi and giganteus were used by various authors until 1942, when Charles Lewis Camp judged that it was more appropriate to use the specific epithet hoffmannii for the species to which the second specimen belongs, also considering it as its holotype. This point of view has since been recognized by the scientific community.

== Early American discoveries ==
=== Earliest discoveries ===
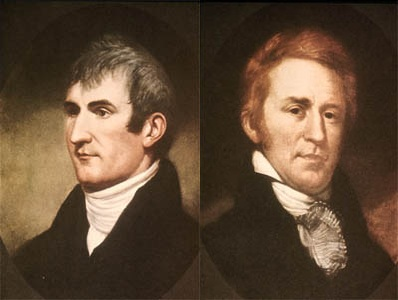
The Lewis and Clark Expedition may have discovered the first Mosasaurus fossil in North America

The first possible recorded discovery of a mosasaur in North America was of a partial skeleton described as "a fish" in 1804 by Meriwether Lewis and William Clark's Corps of Discovery during their 1804–1806 expedition across the western United States. It was found by Sergeant Patrick Gass on black sulfur bluffs near the Cedar Island alongside the Missouri River and consisted of some teeth and a disarticulated vertebral column measuring 45 feet (14 m) in length. Four members of the expedition recorded the discovery in their journals including Clark and Gass. Some parts of the fossil were collected and sent back to Washington, D.C., where it was lost before any proper documentation could be made. In 2003, American marine biologist Richard Ellis speculated that the remains may have belonged to M. missouriensis. Alternatively, a 2007 study led by American paleontologist Robert W. Meredith and colleagues suggested that the fossils would possibly come from a tylosaurine mosasaur based on the measurements cited by Clark and Gass and the evidence of Tylosaurus fossils that have been found in the Missouri River. However, the authors also mentioned the possibility that the remains would also come from an elasmosaurid plesiosaur, which are also known from the river, although being rarer.

The earliest description of North American fossils firmly attributed to the genus Mosasaurus was made in 1818 by naturalist Samuel Latham Mitchill. The described fossils were of a tooth and jaw fragment recovered from a marl pit from Monmouth County, New Jersey, which Mitchell described as "a lizard monster or saurian animal resembling the famous fossil reptile of Maestricht", implying that the fossils had affinities with the then-unnamed M. hoffmannii holotype from Maastricht. Cuvier was aware of this discovery but doubted whether it belonged to the genus Mosasaurus. An unnamed foreign naturalist "unreservedly" declared that the fossils instead belonged to a species of Ichthyosaurus. In 1830, zoologist James Ellsworth De Kay reexamined the specimen; he concluded that it was indeed a species of Mosasaurus and was considerably larger than the M. hoffmannii holotype, making it the largest fossil reptile ever discovered on the continent at the time. Whether the two belonged to the same species or not remained unknown until 1838 when German paleontologist Heinrich Georg Bronn designated the New Jersey specimen as a new species and named it Mosasaurus dekayi in honor of De Kay's efforts. However, the specimen was lost and the taxon was declared a nomen dubium in 2005. There are some additional fossils from New Jersey that have been historically referred to as M. dekayi, but paleontologists have reidentified them as fossils of M. hoffmannii.

=== M. missouriensis saga ===
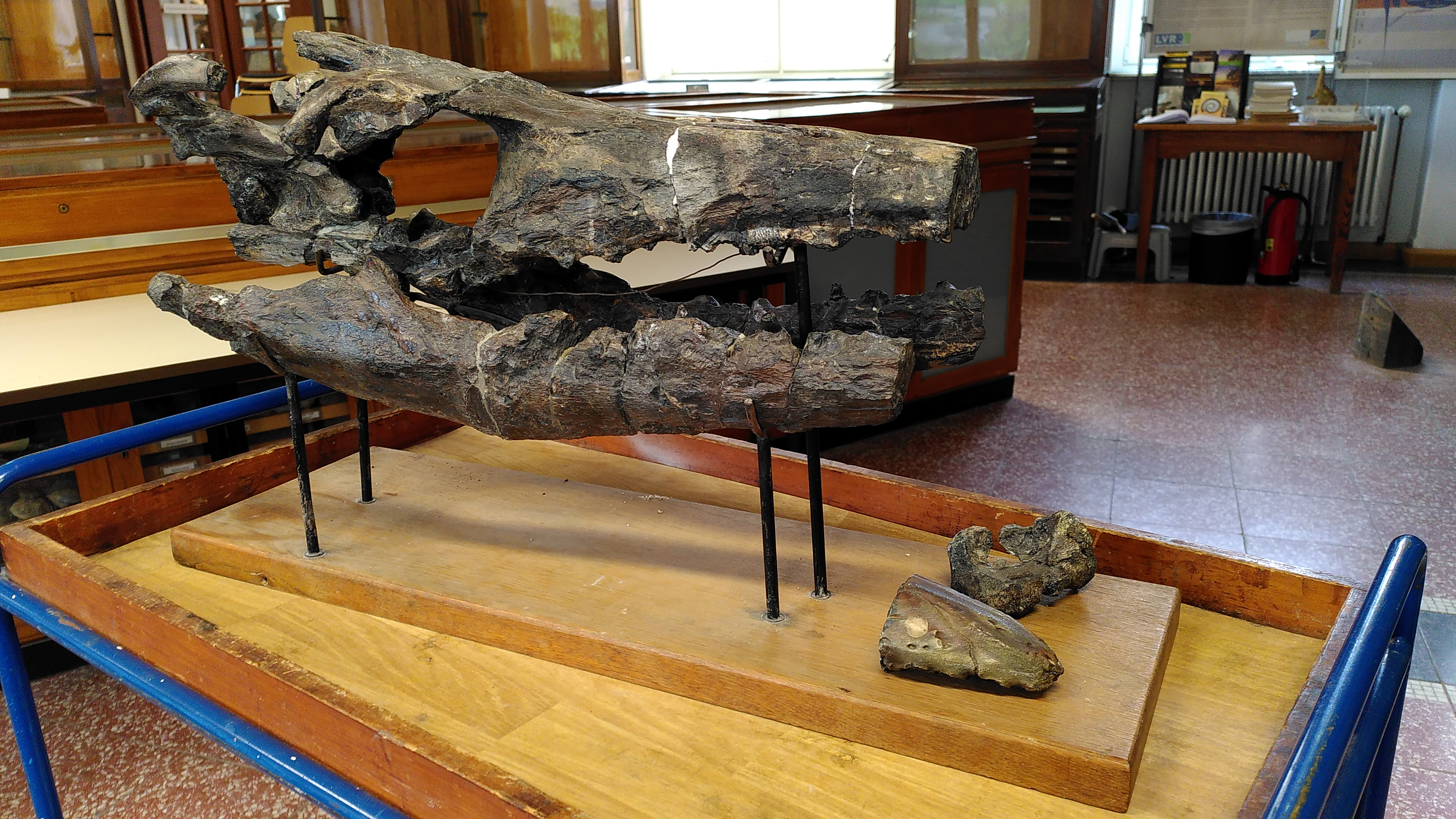
M. missouriensis holotype, with the Goldfuss skull (RFWUIP 1327) mounted and a cast of the Harlan snout (MNHN 9587) below

The type specimen of the second described species M. missouriensis (RFWUIP 1327) was first discovered in the early 1830s, recovered by a fur trapper near the Big Bend of the Missouri River located in South Dakota. This specimen, which consisted of some vertebrae and a partially complete articulated skull notably missing the end of its snout, was brought back to St. Louis, where it was purchased by Indian agent Benjamin O'Fallon as home decoration. This fossil caught the attention of German prince Maximilian of Weid-Neuwied during his 1832–1834 travels in the American West. He purchased the fossil and delivered it to University of Bonn naturalist Georg August Goldfuss for research. Goldfuss carefully prepared and described the specimen, which he concluded in 1845 was of a new species of Mosasaurus and in 1845 named it M. maximiliani in honor of Maximilian.

However, earlier in 1834, American naturalist Richard Harlan published a description of a partial fossil snout he obtained from a trader from the Rocky Mountains who found it in the same locality as the Goldfuss specimen. Harlan thought it belonged to a species of Ichthyosaurus based on perceived similarities with the skeletons from England in features of the teeth and positioning of the nostrils and named it Ichthyosaurus missouriensis. In 1839, he revised this identification after noticing differences in the premaxillary bone and pores between the fossil snout and those of Ichthyosaurus and instead thought that the fossil actually pertained to a new genus of a frog or salamander-like amphibian, reassigning it to the genus Batrachiosaurus. For unknown reasons, a publication in the same year from the Société géologique de France documented Harlan reporting the new genus as Batrachotherium. In a 1845 letter, von Meyer argued that the snout belonged to neither an ichthyosaur nor an amphibian but to a mosasaur, and suspected that it may have been the snout that was missing in the Goldfuss skull. Although the snout was noted as lost at the time, the American paleontologist Joseph Leidy erected in 1857 the new combination M. missouriensis after this suggestion, which has since entered common use. The snout was finally rediscovered in May 2004 inside the collections of the MNHN under the catalog number MNHN 9587; records revealed that Harlan at one point donated the fossil to the museum, where it was promptly forgotten. As previously suggested, the snout exactly matches the skull described by Goldfuss, confirming von Meyer's initial suspicion and followed by other authors. Having initially been described in 1834, M. missouriensis represents the first fossil reptile to be named in the American West.

== Later discoveries ==
Confirmed species other than M. hoffmannii and M. missouriensis (considered to be the most well-known and studied species of the Mosasaurus genus) have been described.

=== M. conodon ===
In 1881, Cope described a fragmentary skeleton including a partial lower jaw, some teeth and vertebrae, as well as various limb bones. The fossils had been sent to Cope by Professor Samuel Lockwood of Rutgers University, who discovered them in deposits around Freehold Township, New Jersey. The specimen has since been housed in the collections of the American Museum of Natural History under the catalog number AMNH 1380. Cope declared that the fossils represented a new species of Clidastes based on their slender build and named it Clidastes conodon. Cope did not provide an etymology for the specific epithet conodon, but etymologist Ben Creisler suggested that it may be a portmanteau meaning "cone tooth", derived from the Ancient Greek κῶνος (kônos, meaning "cone") and ὀδών (odṓn, meaning "tooth"), likely in reference to the smooth-surfaced conical teeth characteristic of the species. In a 1966 study, American paleontologists Donald Baird and Gerard R. Case transferred the species to the genus Mosasaurus, the taxon then being renamed M. conodon. This reassignment was based on the still-unpublished descriptions made by the Canadian paleontologist Dale A. Russell, an interpretation that he retained in his monograph published one year later, in 1967.

=== M. lemonnieri ===
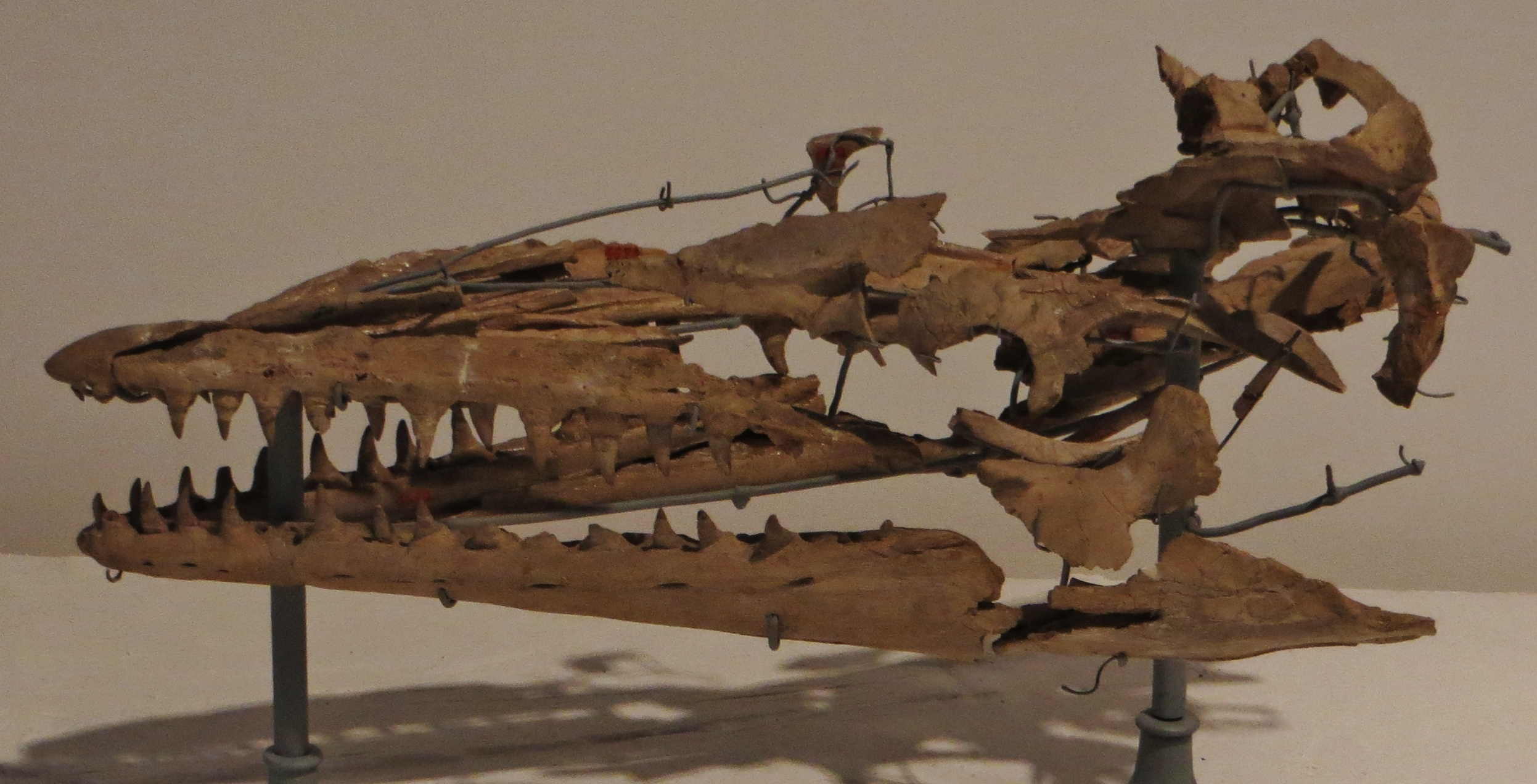
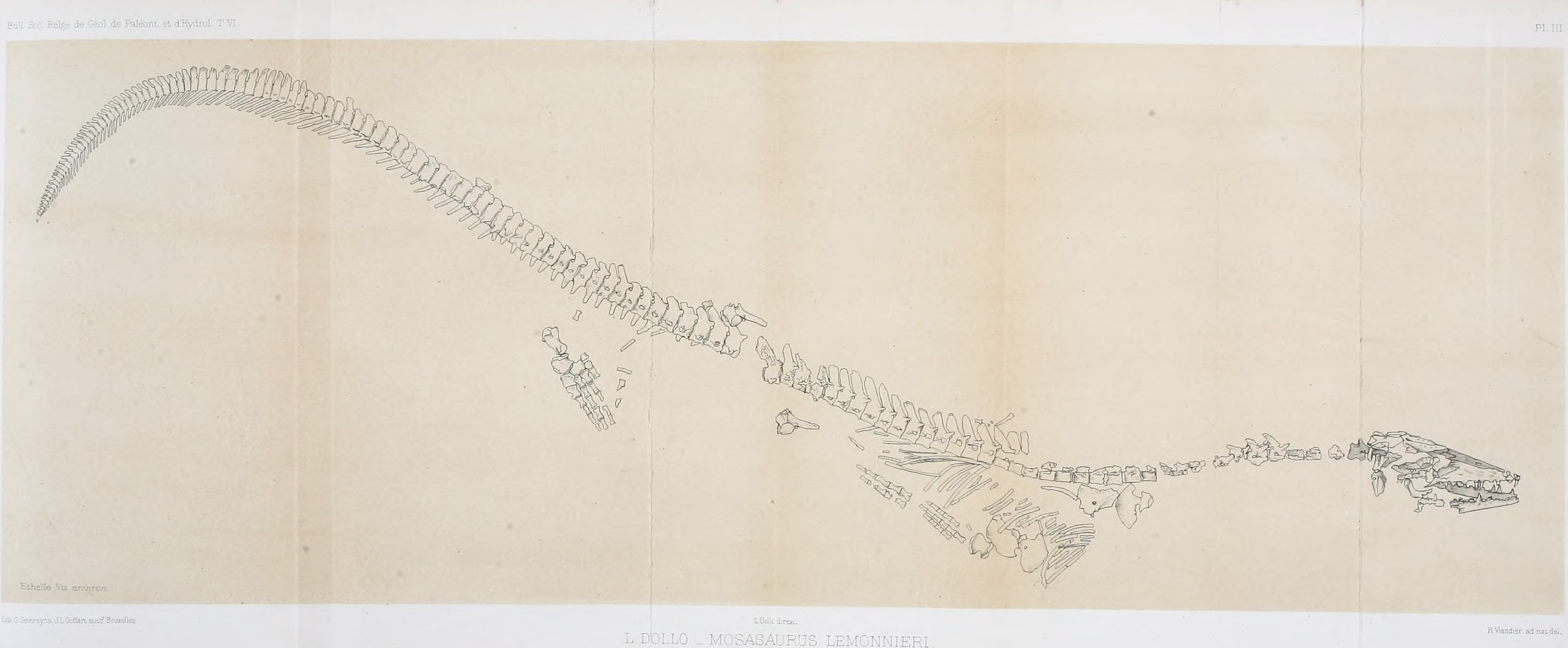
IRSNB R 28, M. lemonnieri holotype skull (top), and a 1892 drawing of IRSNB R 29, one of many referred specimens of the species described by Dollo (bottom)

M. lemonnieri was first described in 1889 by paleontologist Louis Dollo on the basis of a specimen comprising a relatively complete skull and several cervical vertebrae recovered from a phosphate quarry owned by the Solvay S.A. company in the Ciply Basin of Mesvin, Belgium. This same specimen, since numbered as IRSNB R 28, was one of many fossils donated to the Museum of Natural Sciences (IRSNB) by Alfred Lemonnier, the director of the company; as such, Dollo named the species in his honor. In subsequent years, further mining of the quarry yielded additional well-preserved fossils of the species, some of which were described by Dollo in later papers. These fossils include multiple partial skeletons, nearly enough to represent the species entire skeleton. Despite being one of the most anatomically well-represented among the genus, M. lemonnieri was largely ignored by scientific literature. South African paleontologist Theagarten Lingham-Soliar suggested two reasons for such neglect in his study published in 2000. The first reason was that M. lemonnieri fossils are mainly reported to Belgium and the Netherlands; these areas, despite the famous discovery of the M. hoffmannii holotype, have generally not attracted the attention of mosasaur paleontologists. The second reason was that M. lemonnieri was overshadowed by its more famous and history-rich congeneric M. hoffmannii.

M. lemonnieri was historically a controversial taxon, and some have argued that it is synonymous with other species. In 1967, Russell argued that differences between M. lemonnieri and M. conodon were insufficient to justify them as distinct species, making the former a junior synonym of the latter under the principle of priority. In his 2000 study, Lingham-Soliar refuted this proposed synonymy through a comprehensive examination of IRSNB's specimens, identifying significant differences in skull morphology, following an analysis of IRSNB's specimens, while he declared that better studies of M. conodon would be needed to settle this issue. This finding was corroborated and confirmed in a 2015 study on this subject led by Japanese paleontologist Takehito Ikejiri and his American colleague Spencer G. Lucas. Alternatively, Dutch paleontologists Eric Mulder, Dirk Cornelissen, and Louis Verding suggested in a 2004 discussion that M. lemonnieri could actually be juvenile representatives of M. hoffmannii. They argued that the differences between the two species, observable only in "ideal cases", could be explained by age-based variation. However, this was disputed in 2013 by Canadian paleontologists Hallie Street and Michael Caldwell at the Society of Vertebrate Paleontology meeting, who pointed major anatomical distinctions between the two species, notably in the morphology of the dentary bone and dentition. Subsequently, IRSNB's specimens of M. lemonnieri were the subject of a 2020 dental study led by Czech paleontologist Daniel Madzia, before the species underwent a full taxonomic revision in 2026. Conducted by Canadian paleontologist Henry S. Sharpe and colleagues, this study reaffirmed the validity of the taxon by identifying several clear autapomorphies, particularly in the skull. While recognizing the overall validity of the descriptions by Lingham-Soliar and Madzia, the authors revealed that one of the specimens previously assigned to M. lemonnieri actually belongs to a distinct new mosasaur genus, which they named Thoraxion.

=== M. beaugei ===
M. beaugei was named in 1952 by French paleontologist Camille Arambourg in part of a large-scale project since 1934 to study and provide paleontological and stratigraphic data of Morocco to phosphate miners such as the OCP Group. The species was initially described from nine isolated teeth originating from phosphate deposits in the Oulad Abdoun Basin and the Ganntour Basin in Morocco and was named in honor of OCP General Director Alfred Beaugé, who invited Arambourg to partake in the research project and helped provide local fossils. The holotype tooth has since been numbered as MNHN PMC 7. A 2004 study conducted by French paleontologist Nathalie Bardet and her colleagues reexamined Arambourg's teeth and found that only three can be firmly attributed to M. beaugei. Two of the other teeth were described as having variations that may possibly be within the species but were ultimately not referred to M. beaugei, while the remaining four teeth were found to be unrelated to it and of uncertain identity. The study also described additional fossils of M. beaugei, including two relatively well-preserved skulls recovered from the Oulad Abdoun Basin.

== Early depictions and developments ==
Scientists have initially imagined that Mosasaurus had webbed feet and terrestrial limbs and thus was an amphibious marine reptile capable of both terrestrial and aquatic locomotion. Scholars like Goldfuss argued that the skeletal features of Mosasaurus known at the time such as an elastic vertebral column indicated a walking ability; if Mosasaurus was entirely aquatic, it would have been better supported by a stiff backbone. But in 1854, German zoologist Hermann Schlegel became the first to prove through anatomical evidence that Mosasaurus had flippers instead of feet. Using fossils of Mosasaurus phalanges including the gypsum-encased specimens collected by Hoffmann (which Schlegel extracted from the gypsum, noting that it may have misled previous scientists), he observed that they were broad and flat and showed no indication of muscle or tendon attachment, indicating that Mosasaurus was incapable of walking and instead had flipper-like limbs for a fully aquatic lifestyle. Schlegel's hypothesis was largely ignored by his contemporaries, but was more widely accepted in the 1870s when more complete mosasaur fossils in North America were discovered by American paleontologists Othniel Charles Marsh and Cope.

=== Crystal Palace statue ===
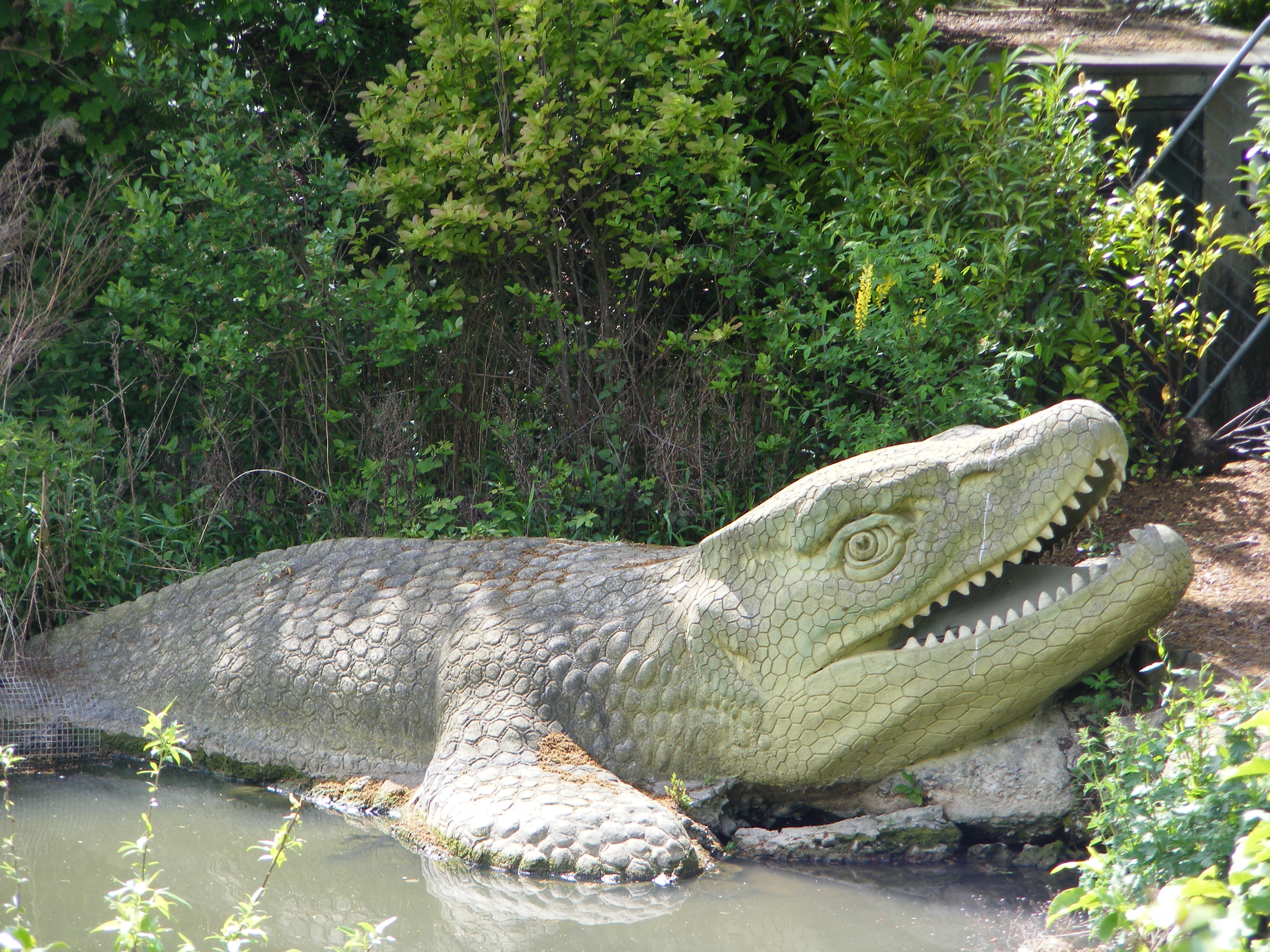
An 1854 depiction of Mosasaurus in Crystal Palace Park

One of the earliest paleoart depictions of Mosasaurus is a life-size concrete sculpture constructed by natural history sculptor Benjamin Waterhouse Hawkins between 1852 and 1854 as part of the collection of sculptures of prehistoric animals on display at the Crystal Palace Park in London. Hawkins sculpted the model under the direction of the English paleontologist Sir Richard Owen, who was informed on the possible appearance of Mosasaurus primarily based on the holotype skull. Given the knowledge of the possible relationships between Mosasaurus and monitor lizards, Hawkins depicted the prehistoric animal as essentially a water-going monitor lizard. The head was large and boxy, based on Owen's estimations of the holotype skull's dimensions being 2.5 feet (0.76 m) × 5 feet (1.5 m), with nostrils at the side of the skull, large volumes of soft tissue around the eyes, and lips reminiscent of monitor lizards. The skin was given a robust scaley texture similar to those found in larger monitor lizards such as the Komodo dragon. Depicted limbs include a right single flipper, which reflected on the aquatic nature of Mosasaurus.

The model was uniquely sculpted deliberately incomplete, with only the head, back, and single flipper having been constructed. This is commonly attributed to Owen's lack of clear knowledge regarding the postcranial (behind the skull) anatomy of Mosasaurus, but Mark P. Witton found this unlikely given that Owen was able to guide a full speculative reconstruction of a Dicynodon sculpture, which was also known solely from skulls at the time. Witton instead suggested that time and financial constraints may have influenced Hawkins to cut corners and sculpt the Mosasaurus model in a way that would be incomplete but visually acceptable. To hide the missing anatomical parts, the sculpture was partially submerged in the lake and placed near the Pterodactylus models at the far side of the main island. Although some elements of the Mosasaurus sculpture such as the teeth have been accurately depicted, many elements of the model can be considered inaccurate, even at the time. The depiction of Mosasaurus with a boxy head, side-positioned nose, and flippers contradicted the studies of Goldfuss (1845), whose examinations of the vertebrae and skull of M. missouriensis instead called for a narrower skull, nostrils at the top of the skull, and amphibious terrestrial limbs (the latter of which is incorrect in modern standards). The ignorance of these findings may have been due to a general ignorance of Goldfuss's studies by other contemporaneous scientists.

== History of taxonomy ==
=== Early status as a wastebasket taxon ===
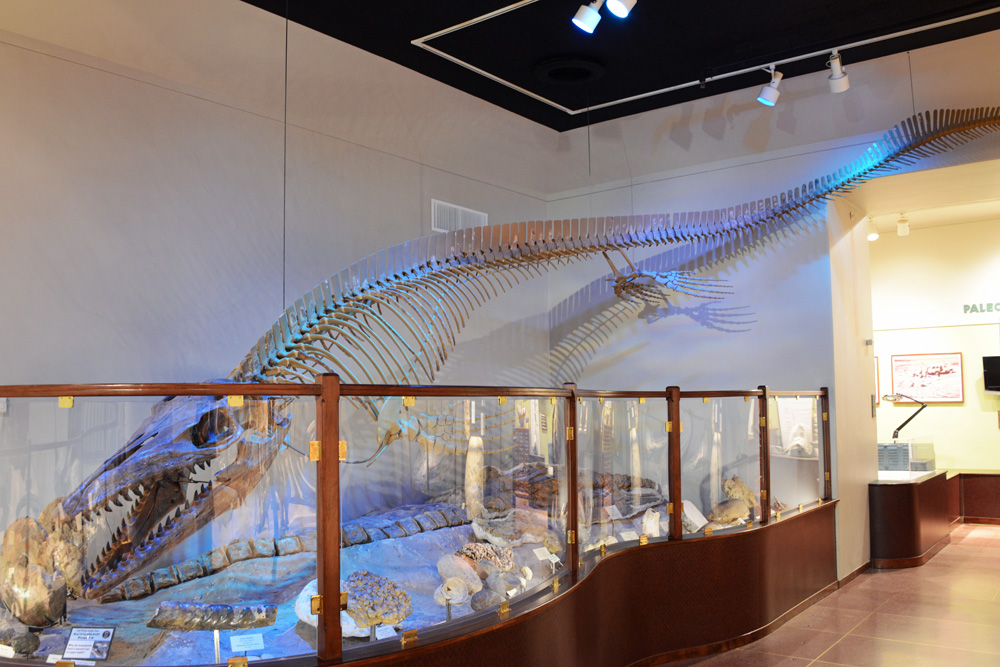
Mounted skeleton at the Texas Memorial Museum of a North American M. hoffmannii, which was historically considered a separate species named M. maximus

Because nomenclature rules were not well-defined at the time, 19th century scientists did not give Mosasaurus a proper diagnosis during its first descriptions. This led to ambiguity regarding the definition of the genus, which led it to become a wastebasket taxon that contained as many as fifty different species. The taxonomic issue was so severe that there were cases of species found to be junior synonyms of species found to be junior synonyms themselves. For example, four taxa became junior synonyms of M. maximus, which itself became a junior synonym of M. hoffmannii. This issue was recognized by many scientists at the time, but efforts to clean up the taxonomy of Mosasaurus were hindered due to a lack of a clear diagnosis.

In 1967, Russell published Systematics and Morphology of American Mosasaurs, which contained one of the earliest proper diagnoses of Mosasaurus. Although his work is considered incomplete as he worked solely on North American representatives and did not examine European representatives such as M. hoffmannii in-depth, Russell significantly revised the genus and established a diagnosis that was clearer than previous descriptions. He considered eight species as valid—M. hoffmannii, M. missouriensis, M. conodon, M. dekayi, M. maximus, M. gaudryi, M. lonzeensis, and M. ivoensis. Scientists during the late 1990s and early 2000s would revise this further: M. maximus was synonymized with M. hoffmannii by Mulder (1999) although some scientists maintain that it is a distinct species, M. lemonnieri was resurrected by Lingham-Soliar (2000), M. ivoensis and M. gaudryi were moved to the genus Tylosaurus by Lindgren and Siverson (2002) and Lindgren (2005) respectively, and M. dekayi and M. lonzeensis became dubious.

During the late 20th century, scientists described four additional species from fossils in the Pacific—M. mokoroa, M. hobetsuensis, M. flemingi, and M. prismaticus. In 1995, Lingham-Soliar published one of the earliest modern diagnoses of M. hoffmannii, which provided detailed descriptions of the type species' known anatomy based on a wealth of fossils from deposits around Maastricht. However, some have criticized it for its reliance on referred specimens rather than primarily the holotype as it is normally the convention to establish a species diagnosis using the type specimens, especially on IRSNB R12, a fossil skull questionably attributed to the species.

=== Taxonomic clarification ===
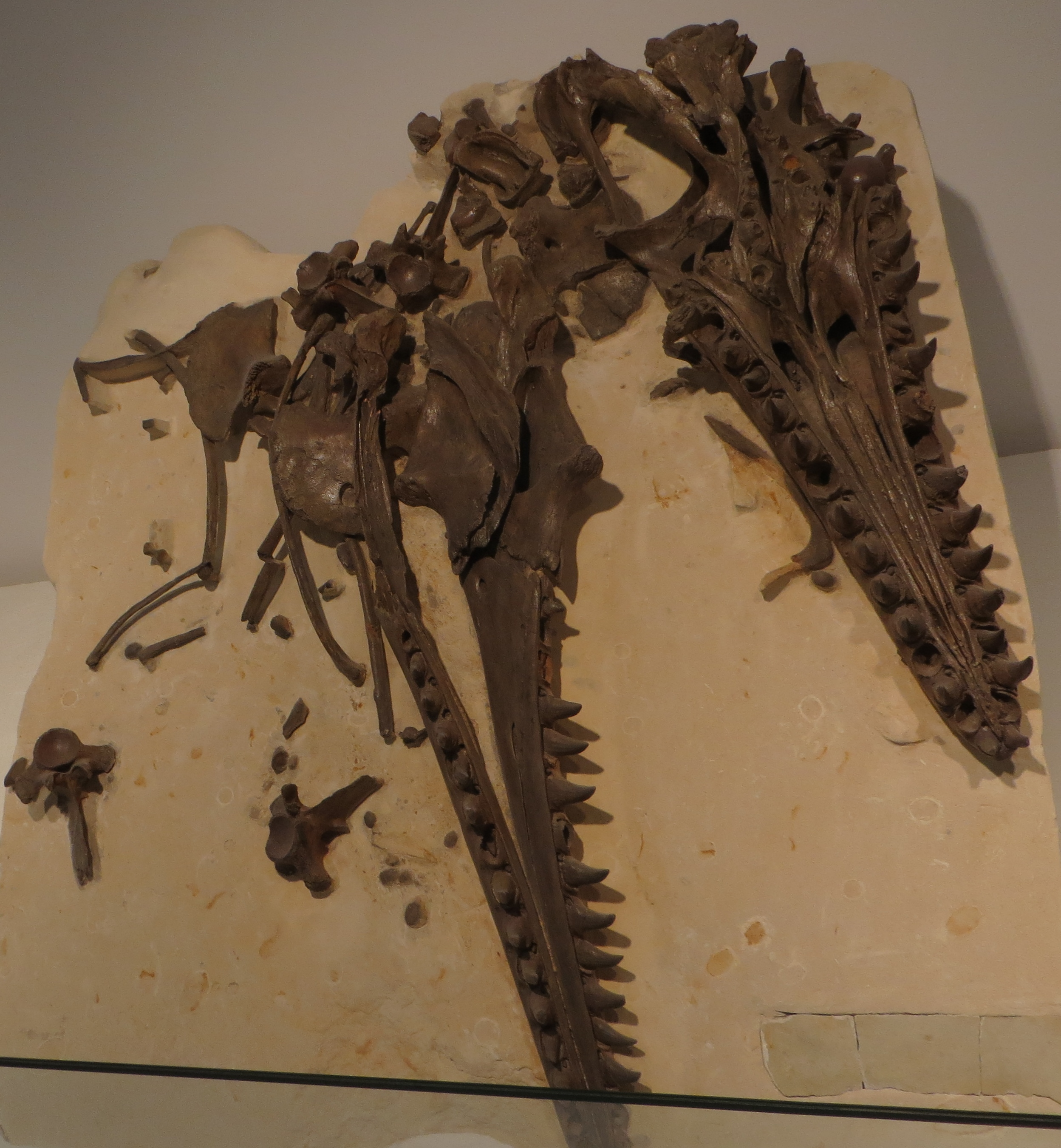
Holotype skull of the proposed new species 'M. glycys'

In 2016, the doctoral thesis of Street was published. This thesis, supervised by Caldwell, performed the first proper description and diagnosis of M. hoffmannii based solely on its holotype since its identification over two hundred years prior. This reassessment of the holotype specimen clarified the ambiguities that plagued earlier researchers and allowed for a significant taxonomic revision of Mosasaurus. A phylogenetic study was performed, testing the relationships between M. hoffmannii and twelve candidate Mosasaurus species—M. missouriensis, M. dekayi, M. gracilis, M. maximus, M. conodon, M. lemonnieri, M. beaugei, M. ivoensis, M. mokoroa, M. hobetsuensis, M. flemingi, and M. prismaticus. Of these twelve, only M. missouriensis and M. lemonnieri were found as distinct species within the genus. M. beaugei, M. dekayi, and M. maximus were recovered as junior synonyms of M. hoffmannii. The placement of M. gracilis and M. ivoensis outside of the Mosasaurinae subfamily was also reaffirmed. M. hobetsuensis and M. flemingi were recovered as representatives of Moanasaurus and renamed accordingly. M. mokoroa and M. prismaticus were recovered as distinct genera, named Antipodinectes and Umikosaurus respectively. Representatives of M. conodon from the Midwestern United States were found to belong to M. missouriensis, while its East Coast representatives became a new genus subsequently named Aktisaurus while preserving the specific epithet conodon. Lastly, the study found IRSNB R12 skull to be a distinct species of Mosasaurus. It was named 'M. glycys', the specific epithet being a romanization of the Ancient Greek γλυκύς (ɡlykýs, meaning "sweet") in reference to the skull's residence in Belgium and the country's "reputation for chocolate production". Street stated that contents of the thesis are intended to be published as scientific papers.

The diagnosis of the Mosasaurus holotype was published in a 2017 peer-reviewed paper co-authored with Caldwell. The taxonomic revision of the genus has yet to be formally published (Note: As the revision remains restricted to a PhD thesis, it is defined as an unpublished work per Article 8 of the ICZN and therefore not formally valid.) but has been verbally referenced in Street and Caldwell (2017) and in abstracts presented at meetings Street and Caldwell (2017) also presented a brief preliminary taxonomic review of Mosasaurus that identified five likely valid species— (Note: As in independent of Street's thesis.) M. hoffmannii, M. missouriensis, M. conodon, M. lemonnieri, and M. beaugei—and considered the four Pacific species to be possibly valid, pending formal reassessment in the future. Although viewed as a probable junior synonym of M. hoffmannii, M. dekayi was included in the potentially valid species list, without its dubious status addressed. In addition, the assessment of M. beaugei as a valid species revised Street (2016)'s prior synonymization based on additional anatomical distinctions. In their 2026 revision of M. lemonnieri, Sharpe and colleagues considered M. conodon to be a nomen dubium, deeming its holotype too fragmentary to be diagnostic. They thus recommended to reassign the more complete specimens previously referred to this taxon to M. missouriensis.
