= Facial Angles (Camper) =

Report of two lectures in 1770 by Petrus Camper

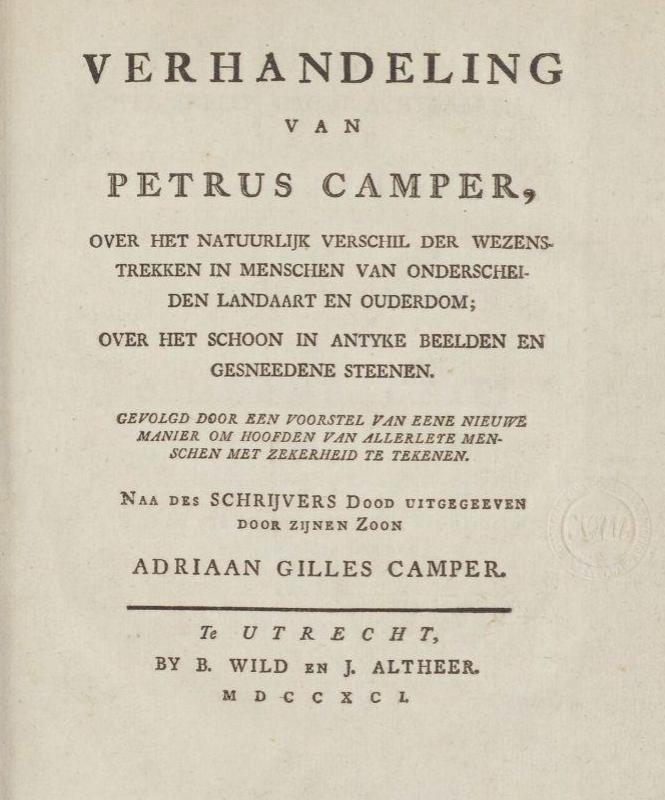
- 1791 posthumous edition by Camper's son
- Author: Petrus Camper
- Original title: Report of the content of two lectures (Dutch: Berigt van den zaaklyken inhoud van twee lessen)
- Illustrator: Petrus Camper, engraved by Reinier Vinkeles
- Language: Dutch, French
- Subject: Facial angles in portraiture through the centuries
- Genre: Art History, Drawing lessons
- Publisher: R. Wild & J. Altheer, Utrecht
- Publication date: 1770, 1791 (engravings)
- Publication place: Netherlands
- Media type: Print (Hardcover), Online version of original text available from the DBNL and Google books
- Pages: Original is a report of a few pages; the posthumous book is longer with notes and engravings

Facial Angles refers to two lectures on this subject by the Amsterdam professor of anatomy Petrus Camper on the 1st and 8 August in 1770, delivered to the Amsterdam Drawing Academy called the Teken-akademie.

== Background ==
Camper was a competent artist and draughtsman who had taken drawing lessons from Carel de Moor and his son Carel Isaak de Moor in Leiden, and whose own pupils had been Martin van Marum, Johannes le Francq van Berkhey, and Wibrand Veltman. His broad interest in the natural sciences had led him to anatomy and he was praelector of the Amsterdam Surgeon's guild, a respected position that placed him also in the Amsterdam vroedschap or regency. He had published papers and lectures on a variety of anatomy subjects, and came to the lectures with several engraved examples of popular art that he wanted to discuss on the basis of anatomy. He brought with him the skull of a baby, child, man, and elderly man, and two large canvasses with sketched drawings of the mathematical dimensions of the human head.

== On traditional drawing lessons ==
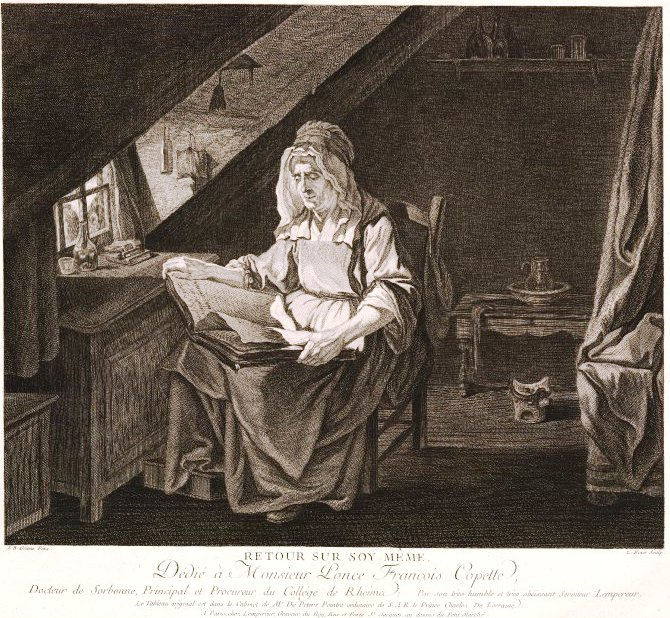
Greuze's "Retour sur soi-même" was an example of a bad likeness of the head of an old woman, because classical drawing theory was applied which was based on a young adult male's head. Merely adding wrinkles and a costume cannot help a poor likeness.

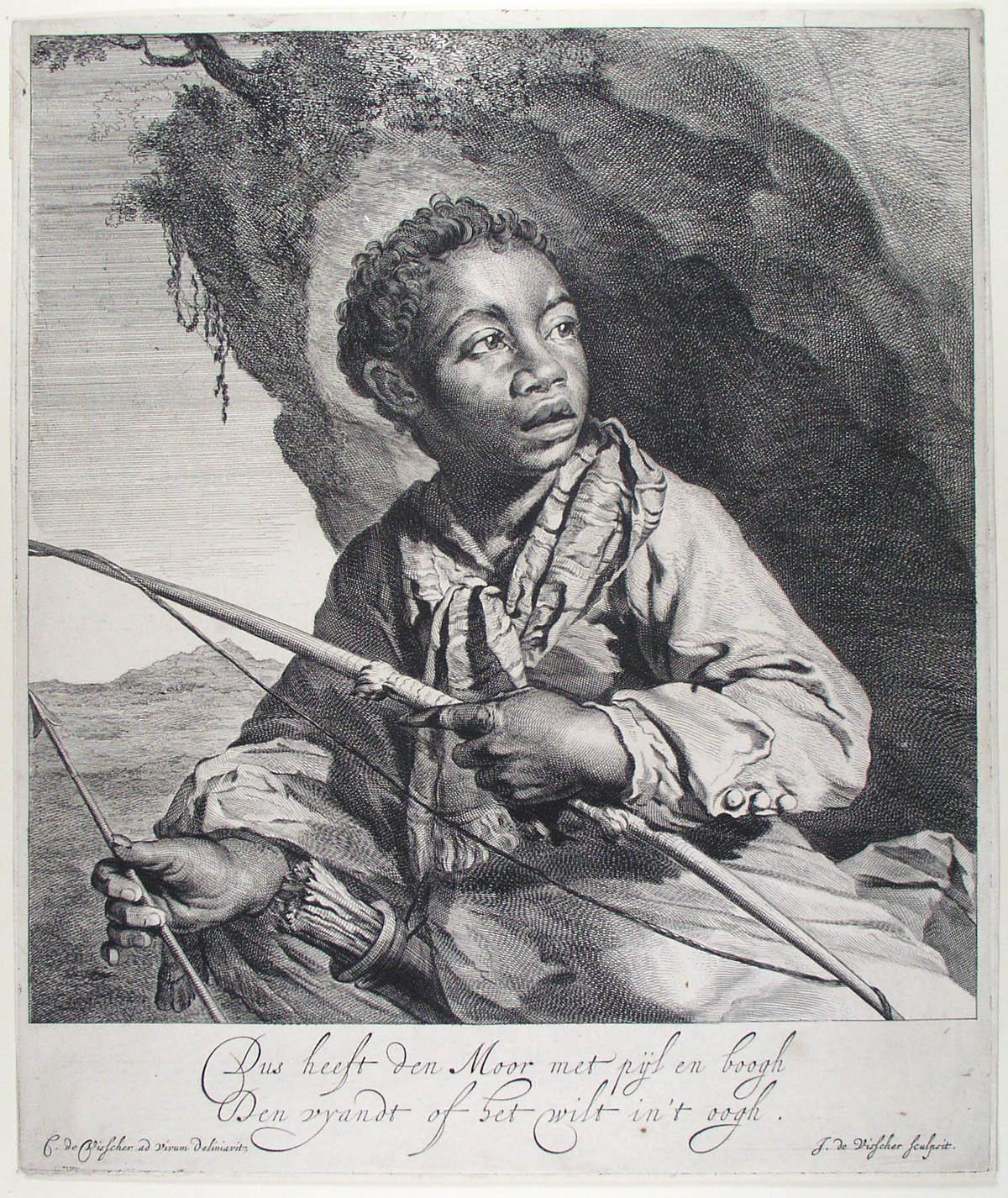
The Moor, an etching by Jan de Visscher after a drawing by his brother Cornelis

Camper's main points in his first lecture were that classical drawing lessons from the time of Vitruvius, including the teachings of Dürer and Perreault, were based on an incorrect assumption that the human head was oval at all ages, and he proceeded to prove this with his dimensions of the skulls. He also remarked that none of the various humans of modern "nations" such as Europeans, Moors or Kalmyk people adhere to the classic form of head so remarkable in Grecian sculpture. The travelogues of Plinius and de Buffon made mention of practises in infancy which caused these national characteristics, such as Chinese women pulling their eye lids to the sides, or African Moors pressing their noses flat, or Europeans pressing their ears flat with caps tied tight. Camper claimed this was all nonsense and the forms of people's faces (and their skulls) were related to their living environments. He then proceeded to demonstrate on his sketches, by shortening the chin he could transform a likeness of a man to an old man, and by adjusting the facial angle, he changed a Moor into a European, and he was so successful in this demonstration with a few lines of chalk, that the hall cheered.

== A new drawing method based on facial angle ==
His first lecture had dwelled on the skull's form among ages and among these three nations, and the second lecture (which was so well populated by students that the hall proved too small) was intended as a practical guide how to better make portraits that looked like the subject. For this he brought with him more sketches in the same dimensions as the first two that by means of arrangement along the dimension lines could be easily compared for sketching. He discussed the classical facial angle using the plaster cast of Apollo that was in the lecture hall.

The artist-collector Cornelis Ploos van Amstel first published notes on Camper's lectures in the Leiden literature society proceedings in 1770 in which a book was promised with engravings, and though Reinier Vinkeles made engravings for this purpose in 1785, a book was only posthumously published by Camper's son Adriaan Gilles Camper in 1791 after Camper senior died.

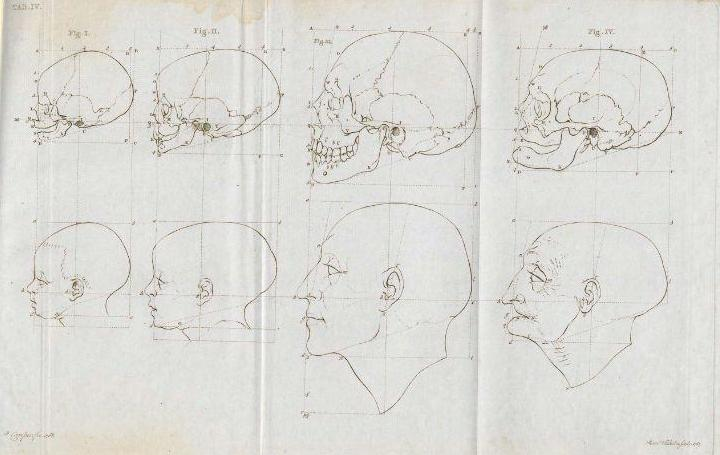
...On the first canvas the head of a child, the head of an adult man, and the head of an old man were shown with their skulls above them, all in profile...

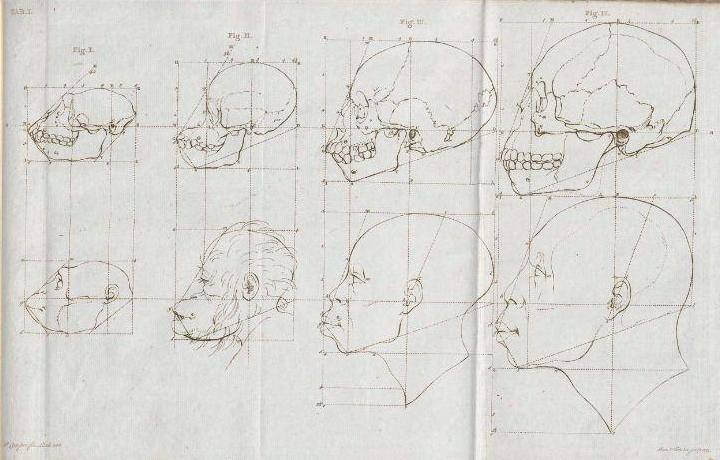
... the second canvas had the heads of two apes, an African Moor and a Kalmyk or Asian, again with their skulls drawn above them...

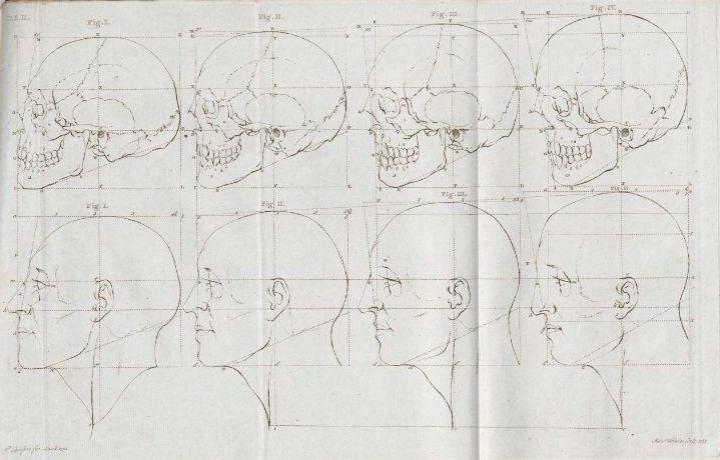
..and again a canvas was brought out with four heads next to each other in profile with varying facial angles; 80 degrees, 90 degrees, and 100 degrees...

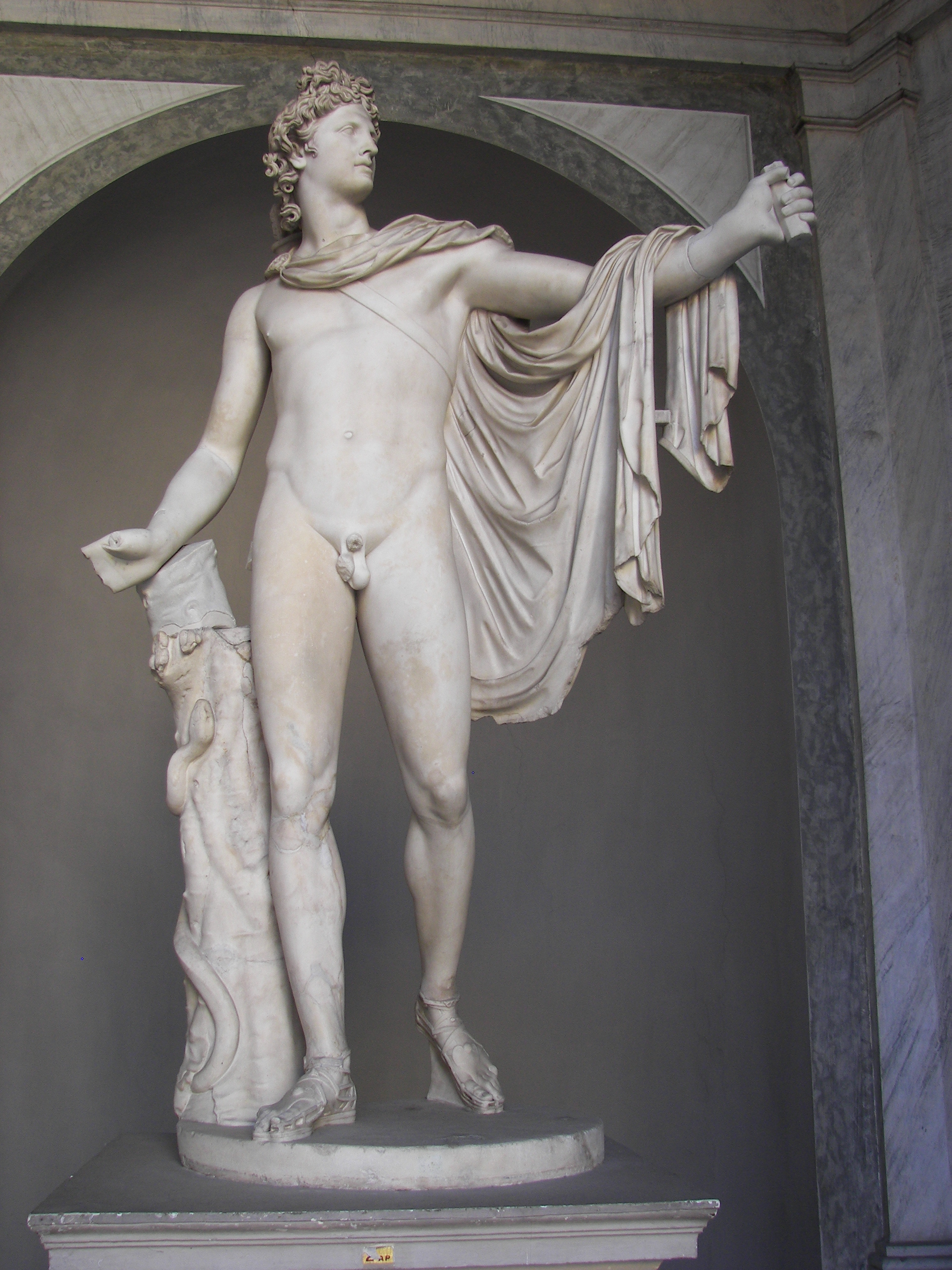
The Apollo Pythias, a plaster cast of which was in the lecture hall.

== Legacy ==
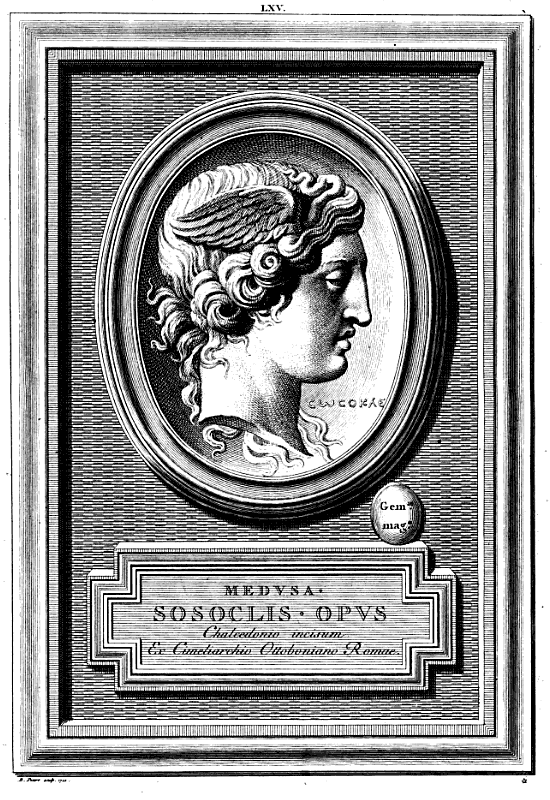
The "monstrous" Medusa with 100 degree facial angle

Camper's work was later quoted again and again, and his engraved drawings were used to prove that he had tried to show a hierarchy of facial angles from the orangutan to the European, but this was never part of either of the two lectures. In fact, he was only trying to help artists make better portraits, and remarked that of all the great masters of art that can be observed in engravings such as Rubens, van Dyk, and Jordaans only the Haarlemmer Cornelis Visscher had ever been able to draw the head of a Moor correctly.

Though Georges Cuvier felt that Camper's sketches showed the superiority of the white man in beauty as being the closest to the Classic ideal, this was against the views of Camper. Camper claimed that both edges of the spectrum were monsters, which is to say that orangutans and apes (with facial angle 42-50 degrees) were just as ugly as Sophocles' Medusa engraved in profile by Bernard Picart for Philipp von Stosch's "Pierres Antiques Gravées". The facial angles of Moors and Kalmyks was calculated to be 70 degrees, and that of a European 80 degrees.

The original report of these lectures in the proceedings of the literature society is listed as one of the 1000 most important texts in the Canon of Dutch Literature.
