= Johann Leonard Hoffmann =

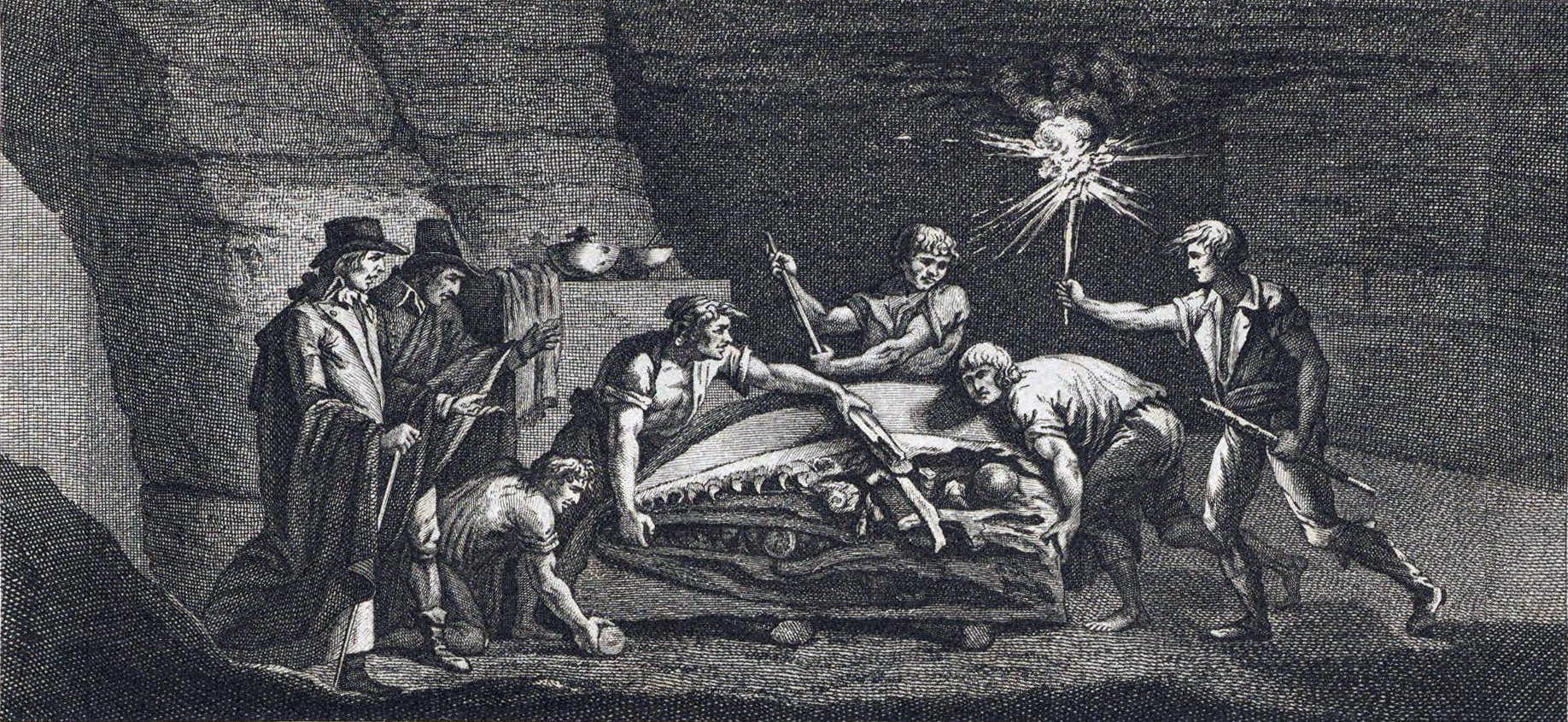
Discovered in the Maastricht caves, the Mosasaurus skull is the first fossil of an extinct reptile identified as such. De Saint-Fond's romantic but inaccurate presentation of the discovery of Mosasaurus showing Hoffmann on the left.

Johann Leonard Hoffmann (1710–1782) was a Maastricht army surgeon and amateur geologist who collected fossils from the local Mount Saint Peter. He is known for fossils named after him, and was one of the three people contacted on the discovery of the Mosasaurus in 1766, and especially the second one in the 1770s known as "le grand animal", that was later taken to Paris by the French Revolutionary Army in 1794.

== History ==
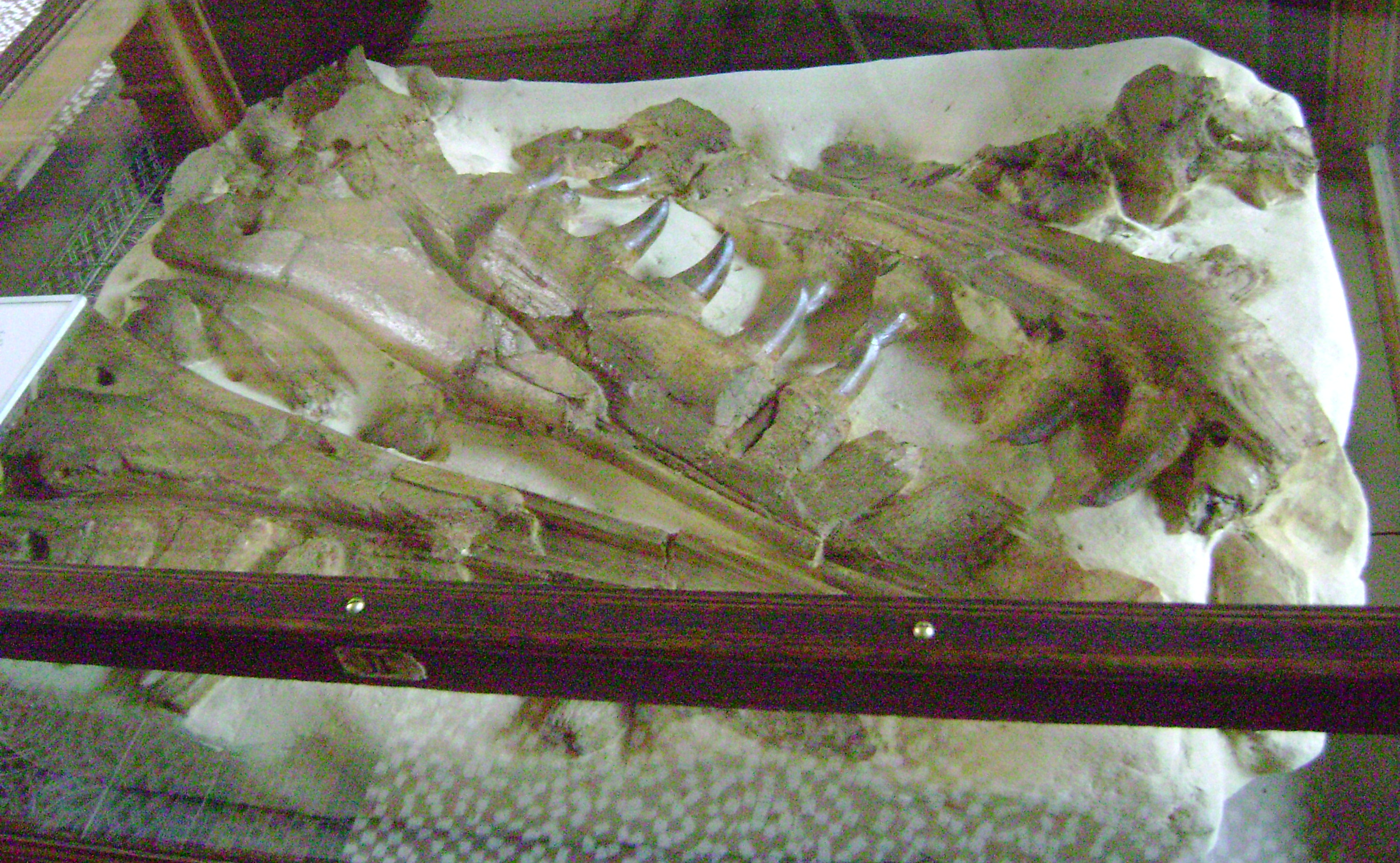
The first skull, found in 1764, purchased in 1784 by Camper's pupil Martin van Marum for the Teylers Museum, where it remains today.

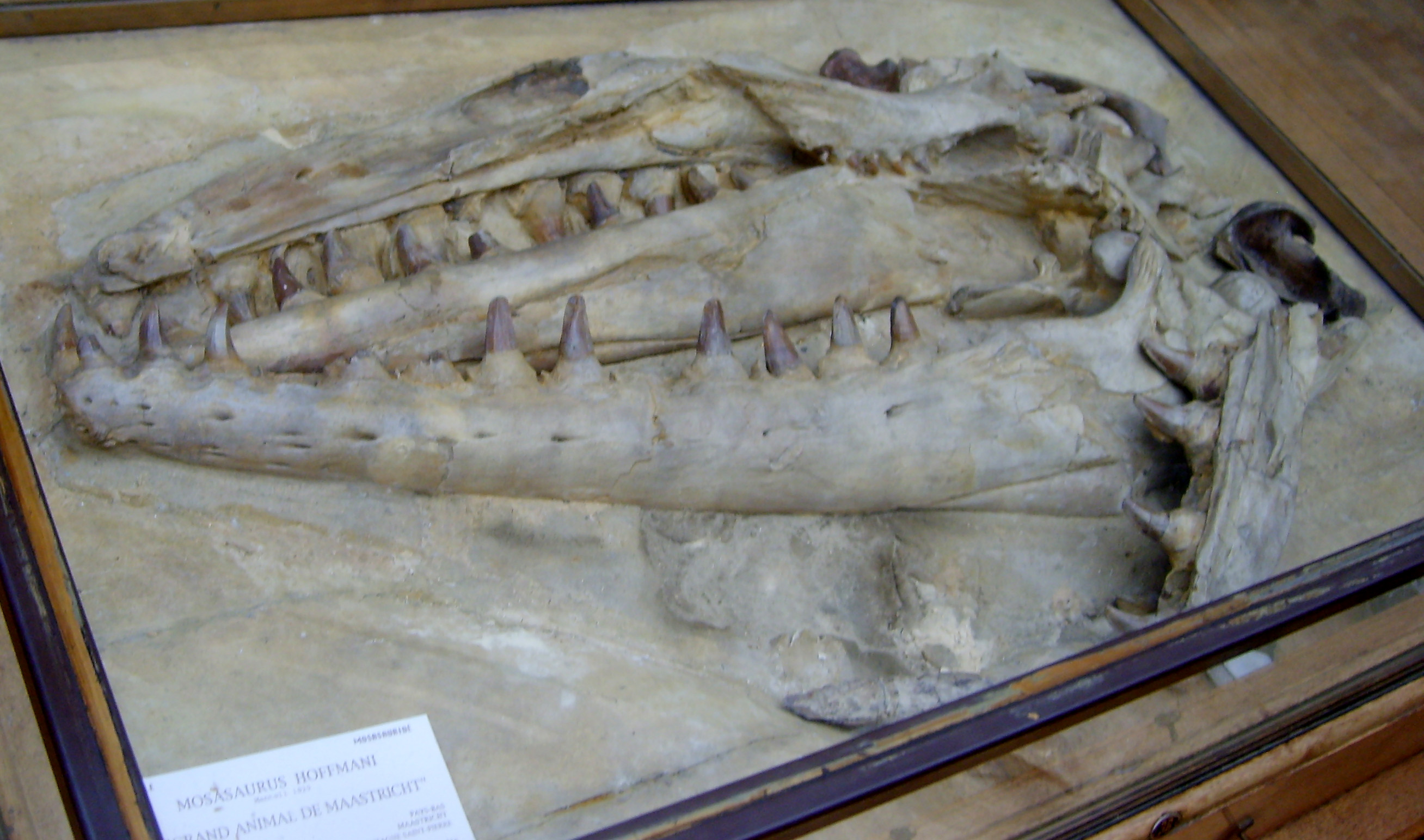
The second skull, M. hoffmannii holotype jaw fragments, known as the "great animal", it was taken as war booty to Paris, where it remains today in the Muséum national d'histoire naturelle

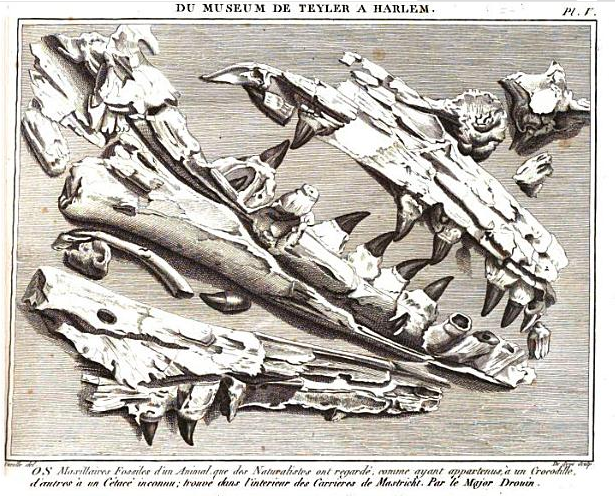
The first skull, engraving from the 1799 book by Barthélemy Faujas de Saint-Fond

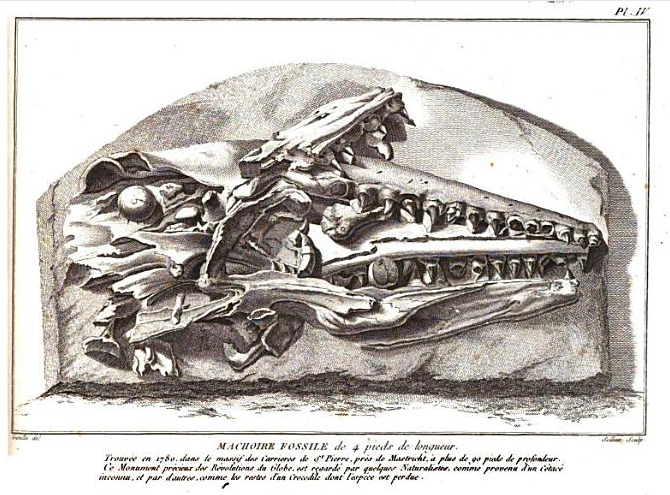
The second skull, engraving from the 1799 book by Faujas de Saint-Fond

In 1798 Barthélemy Faujas de Saint-Fond published his first volume of a monumental natural history series, called Histoire naturelle de la montagne de Saint-Pierre de Maestricht, which also contained an account of the circumstances of the find. According to him Dr Hoffmann paid the quarrymen when they informed him of fossil finds. When the second skull was found in 1770, Hoffmann supposedly lead the excavation. Afterwards another local amateur geologist, the local canon priest Theodorus Joannes Godding (1722–1797), claimed his rights as landowner and forced Hoffmann to relinquish his ownership through a lawsuit, won by influencing the court. Whether or not this story was based on fact, De Saint-Fond saved the specimen for science, promising a considerable reward to Godding to compensate for his loss. However, of this famous story very little can be substantiated by archival evidence. Godding was the original owner, Hoffmann never possessed the fossil, and there was no lawsuit. Faujas de Saint-Fond probably never paid anything and the entire account seems to have been fabricated by him to liven up his book and justify the seizure. The skull was in fact found in October 1778. The local army luitenant Jean Baptiste Drouin was also an avid collector of fossil specimens, and both Drouin and Hoffmann were in correspondence with the famous geologist Petrus Camper about the finds. Camper postulated that the animal was a whale, or in any case a sea creature, rather than a land creature. Faujas de Saint-Fond insisted it was a crocodile, while Camper's son Adriaan claimed it was a monitor lizard and Georges Cuvier felt that it may be something as yet unknown, (the concept of extinction was new).

Much later, Hermann Schlegel accused Hoffmann of falsifying his observations of the fossil. Schlegel was the first to discover that the limbs were actually flippers.

Other fossils that are named after Hoffmann are the giant turtle Allopleuron and another monitor lizard Varanus.

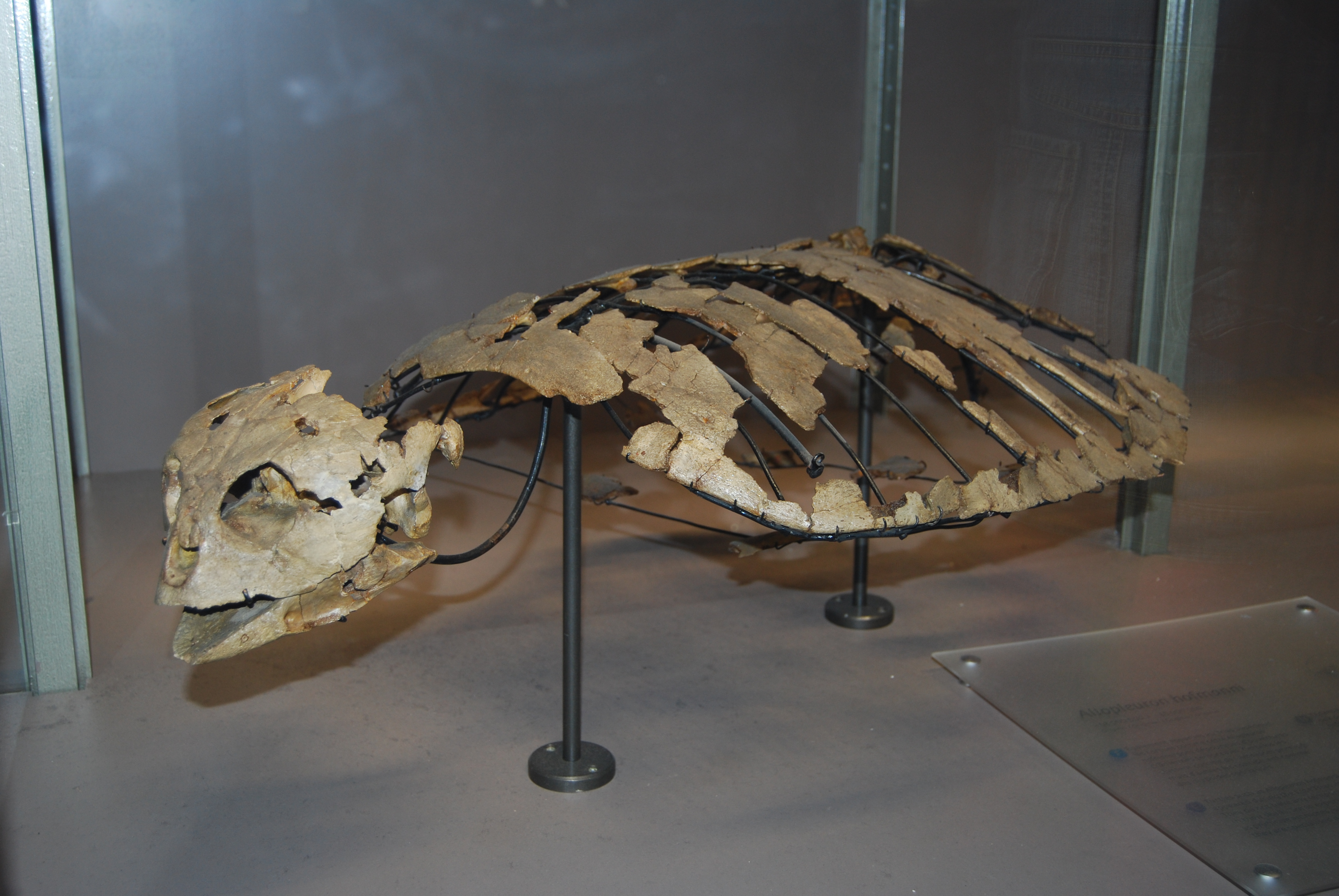
Extinct sea turtle Allopleuron hoffmani

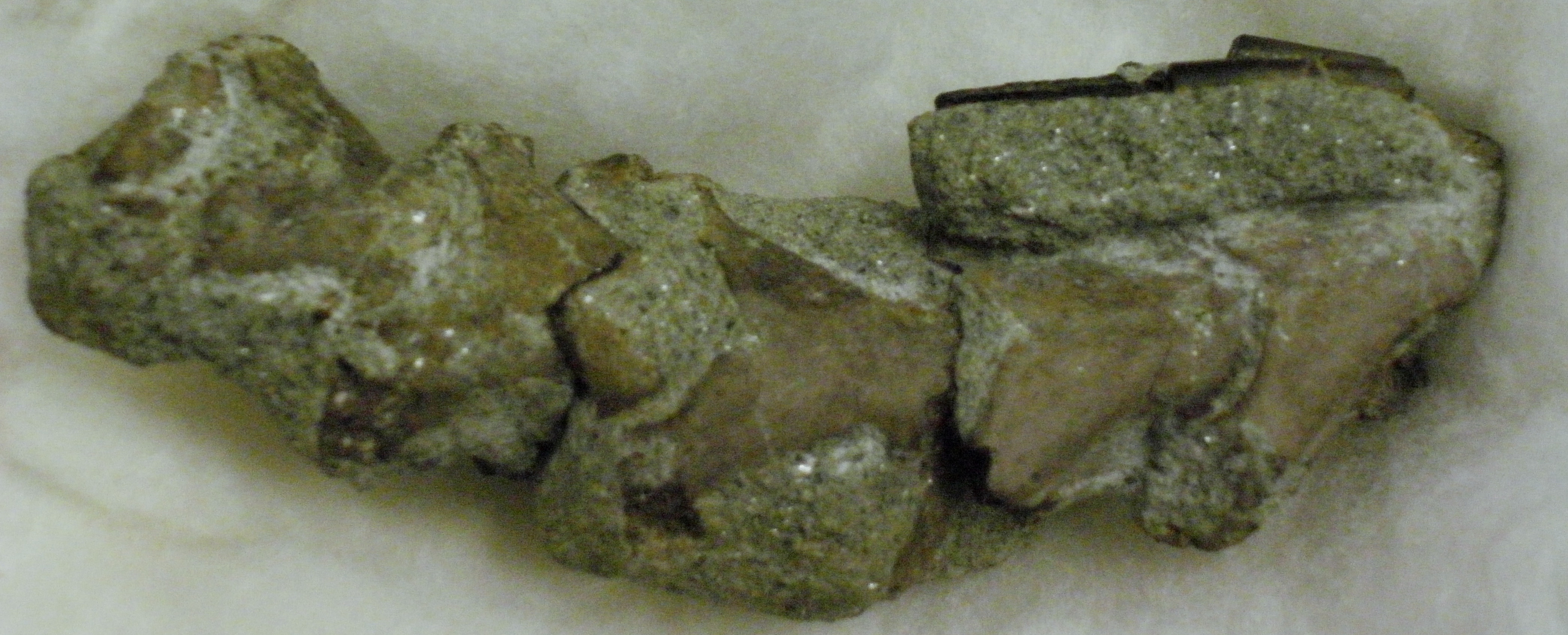
Miocene monitor lizard, Varanus hoffmani, from Serbia
