= Antoine Portal =

Baron Antoine Portal
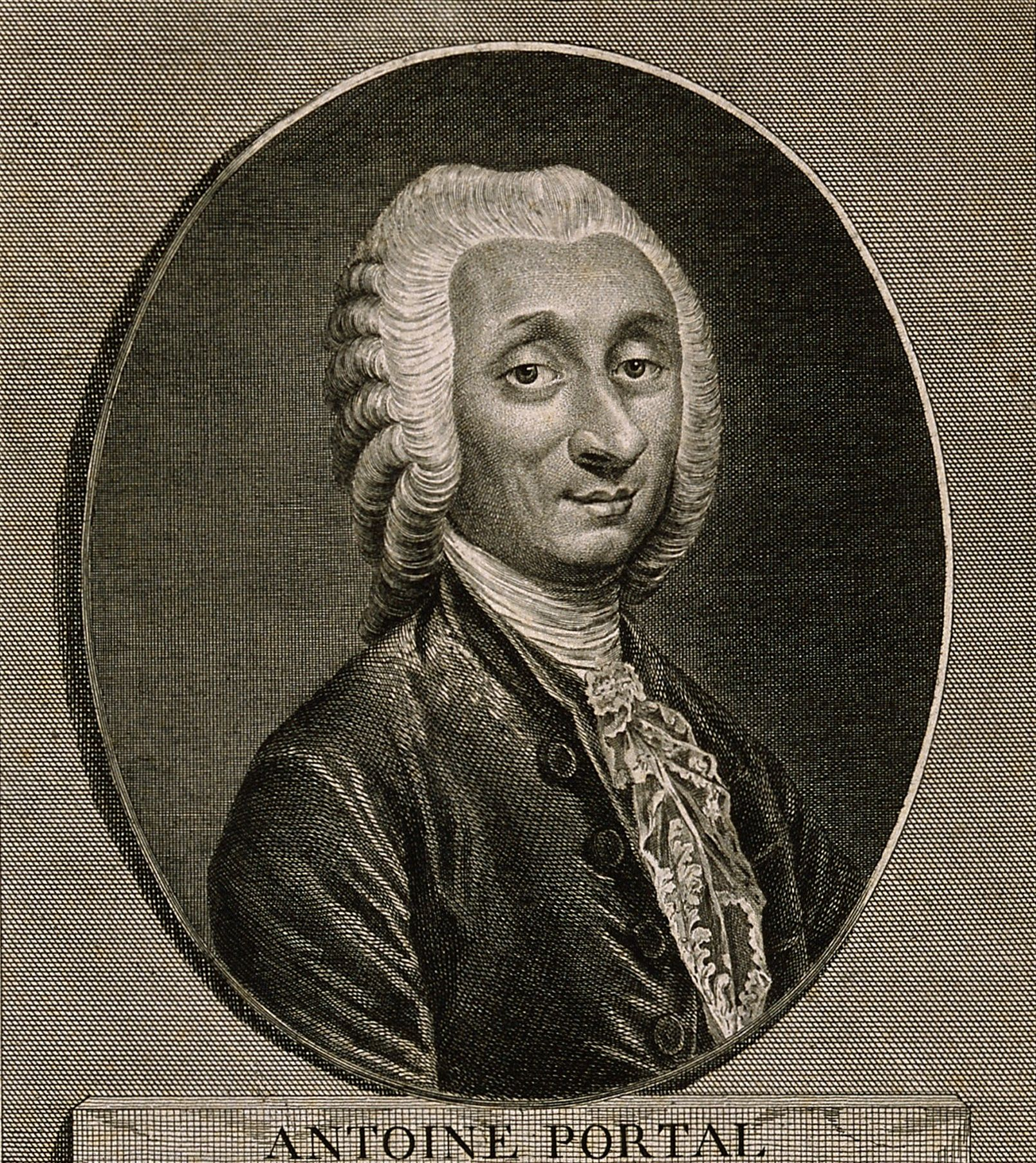
- French Anatomist and medical historian
- Born: 5 January 1742; Gaillac, France
- Died: 23 July 1832 (aged 90); Paris, France
- Occupation: Anatomist

Baron Antoine Portal (5 January 1742 – 23 July 1832) was a French anatomist, medical doctor, medical historian and founding president of the Académie Nationale de Médecine.

== Biography ==
Born on January 5, 1742, in Gaillac, he was the eldest of 12 siblings. He studied at the Jesuit college in Albi followed by Toulouse and then attended the medical faculty in Montpellier between 1762 and 1765.

In 1766, Portal moved to Paris where he became a teacher of anatomy to the dauphin. In 1769 he became professor of anatomy at the Collège de France and in 1778 was appointed to the prestigious position of professor of anatomy at the Jardin du Roi. Louis XVIII named him the first Doctor to the King, a post he served under Charles X as well. His close relationship with King Louis led in 1820 to the creation of what became the Académie Nationale de Médecine, of which he was lifelong president.

In 1803 he published "Cours d'anatomie médicale", a 5-volume work on medical history. He was probably the first to describe amyloid in liver in 1789 when he noted a lard-like substance in an elderly woman's liver. He was the first to describe bleeding due to esophageal varices. He also published article on clinical features of epilepsy.

He died in 1832 at the age of 90 and was buried in Saint Pierre de Montmartre.
