= Petrus Camper =

Dutch scientist

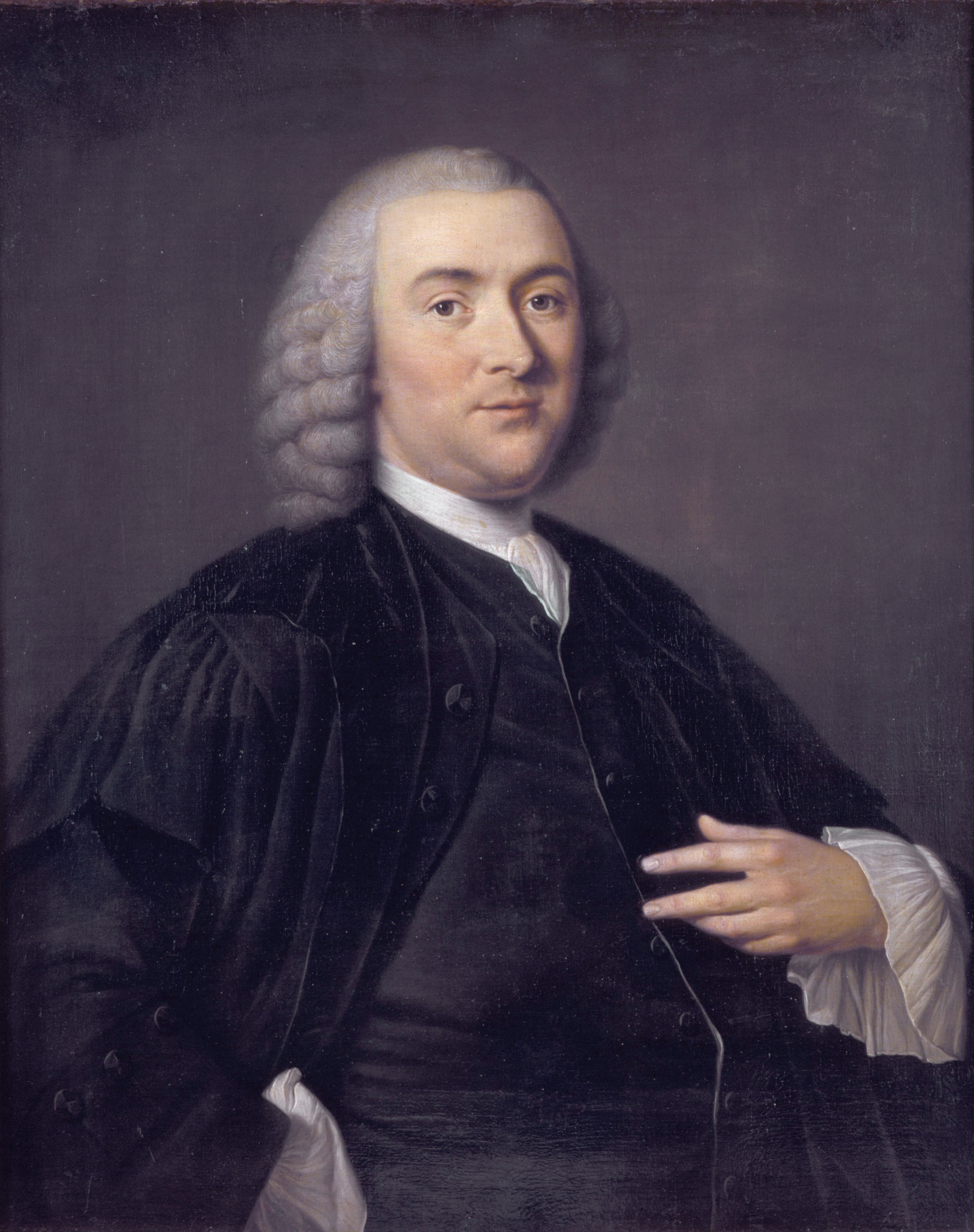
- Petrus Camper
- Born: 11 May 1722; Leiden
- Died: 7 April 1789 (aged 66); The Hague
- Education: University of Leiden, Oxford College
- Known for: inventing the term "extinct" along with Georges Cuvier to describe the mammoth
- Scientific career
- Fields: anatomist physiologist philosopher surgeon (dissection); Draughtsman
- Workplaces: University of Franeker, Amsterdamse Atheneum, University of Groningen
- Doctoral students: Martin van Marum

Petrus Camper FRS (11 May 1722 – 7 April 1789), was a Dutch physician, anatomist, physiologist, midwife, zoologist, anthropologist, palaeontologist and a naturalist in the Age of Enlightenment. He was one of the first to take an interest in comparative anatomy, palaeontology, and the facial angle. He was among the first to mark out an "anthropology," which he distinguished from natural history. He studied the orangutan, the Javan rhinoceros, and the skull of a mosasaur, which he believed was a whale.

Camper was a celebrity in Europe and became a member of the Royal Society (1750), the Göttingen (1779), and Russian Academy of Sciences (1778), the Royal Society of Edinburgh (1783), the French (1786) and the Prussian Academy of Sciences (1788). He designed and constructed tools for his patients, and for surgeries. He was an amateur drawer, a sculptor, a patron of art and a conservative, royalist politician. Camper published some lectures containing an account of his craniometrical methods. These laid the foundation of all subsequent work.

== Studies and teaching ==
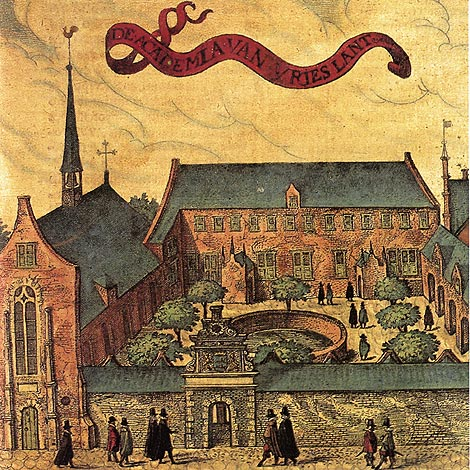
The Academia van Vrieslant in Franeker

Petrus Camper was the son of a well-to-do minister, who made his fortune in Batavia, Dutch East Indies and returned with a (young?) pickled Bornean orangutan in a jar. A brilliant alumnus, he studied medicine and philosophy at the University of Leiden and obtained a degree in both sciences on the same day at the age of 24. After both his parents died Camper travelled to England (where he met with William Smellie), to France (where he met with Georges de Buffon) and Geneva. In the meantime he was appointed professor of philosophy, anatomy and surgery at the University of Franeker, and Camper traveled to Friesland.

In 1756, Camper married the widow Johanna Boerboom, daughter of the burgomaster of Leeuwarden, whom he met while treating her husband, the burgomaster of Harlingen.

== Surgeon's Guild ==
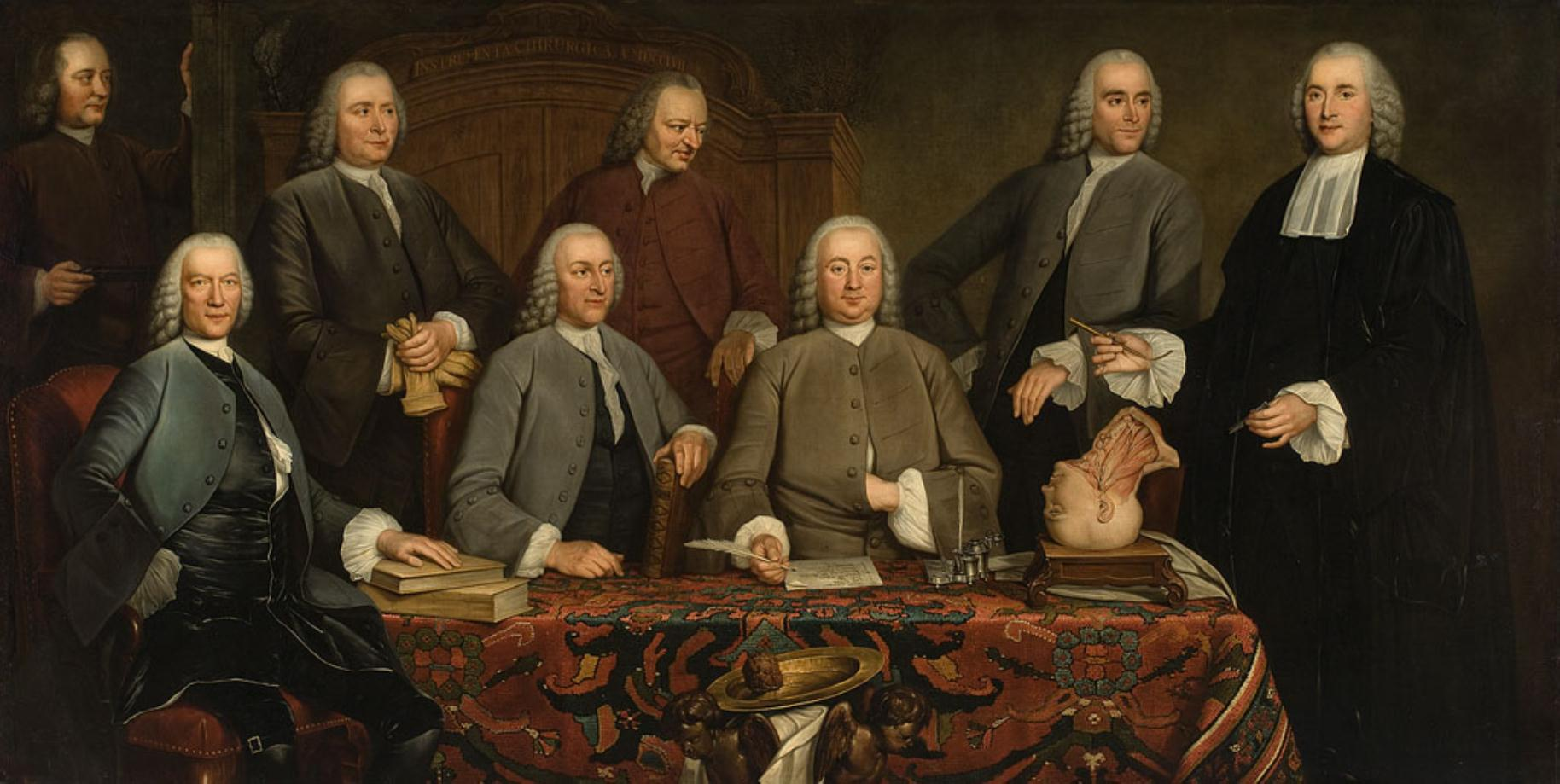
Camper's Anatomy lesson painted in 1758 commemorating his installment as "praelector" of the Surgeon's guild in 1755 in Amsterdam. This painting hung in the Waag and later in the Athenaeum Illustre of Amsterdam

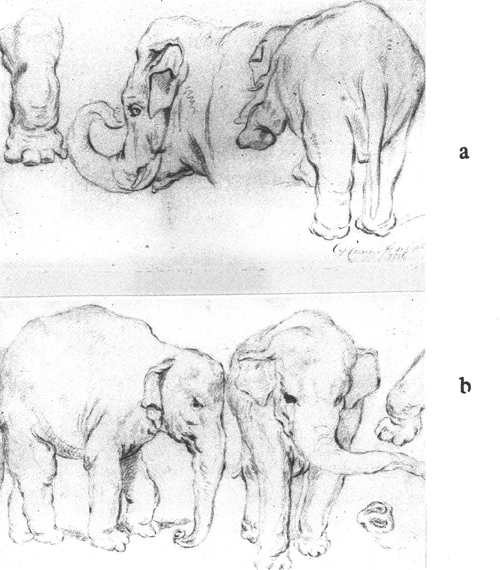
The Indian Elephants Hans and Parki Belonging to the menagerie of Stadholder Willem V

In 1755 he had moved to Amsterdam, where he occupied a chair of anatomy and surgery at the Athenaeum Illustre, later completed by a medicine chair. He investigated inguinal hernia, patella and the best form of shoe. He withdrew five years later to dedicate himself to scientific research, living on his wife's estate "Klein Lankum" just outside Franeker. In his farewell speech, he mentioned that he had dissected more than 50 bodies in public, including a twelve-year-old Angolese African boy. His experience led to the publication of Demonstrationum anatomico-pathologicarum (1760–1762). In 1762 he became politically active and promoted public health issues such as vaccination against smallpox.

In 1763 he accepted the chair of anatomy, surgery and botany at the University of Groningen. He made drawings to illustrate his eloquent lectures and the number of students grew.

His main focus of attention was anatomy, zoology and his collection of minerals and fossils. Among his many works, he studied osteology of birds and discovered the presence of air in the inner cavities of birds' skeletons. He investigated the anatomy of eight young orangutans, establishing it as a different species to humans, as quadrupeds, against the theories of contemporary scientists. "Camper cleared up a lot of confusion when he distinguished the orangutan from the chimpanzee." Petrus Camper published treatises on the hearing of fishes and the sound of frogs. He studied the diseases of rinderpest and rabies (1768–1770). Camper kept a surgical clinic. Before retiring in 1773, he introduced several new instruments and procedures for surgery and obstetrics. Back in Franeker, he dissected an elephant and a Javan rhinoceros, after they died in the menagerie of the stadtholder. In 1782 he published his latest research, a treatise in which he disagreed with Carl Linnaeus and De Buffon on the taxonomy of apes.

- In 1778 he was visited by Samuel Thomas von Sömmering, who later became a professor in Göttingen. Camper was in contact with Johann Friedrich Blumenbach and Johann Heinrich Merck.
- In 1780 he travelled in the company of his son to Wolfenbüttel and met with Gotthold Ephraim Lessing. In Potsdam, he was received by Frederick the Great, introduced by Henri de Catt. In Berlin he met with Moses Mendelsohn and Samuel Formey.
- In 1781 he traveled to Hamburg and met with Prince Henry and Charlotte Sophie of Aldenburg; in 1782 Camper visited the Duke Louis Ernest of Brunswick-Lüneburg.
- In November 1783 he was a Foreign Founding Member of the Royal Society of Edinburgh.
- In 1783 he was appointed by the stadtholder as one of the burgomasters of Workum and in 1784 became one of the directors of the Admiralty of Friesland. Camper was an Orangist, opposing the patriots.
- In 1785 he visited Edmund Burke.
- In September 1787 he became the president of the state council of the Dutch Republic and warmly welcomed the return of the stadtholder William V of Orange and his wife Wilhelmine of Prussia in the Hague.
- At the end of life he suffered from pleuritis; Camper had a Burgundian lifestyle, drank a good glass of champagne and died.

== Comparative anatomy ==
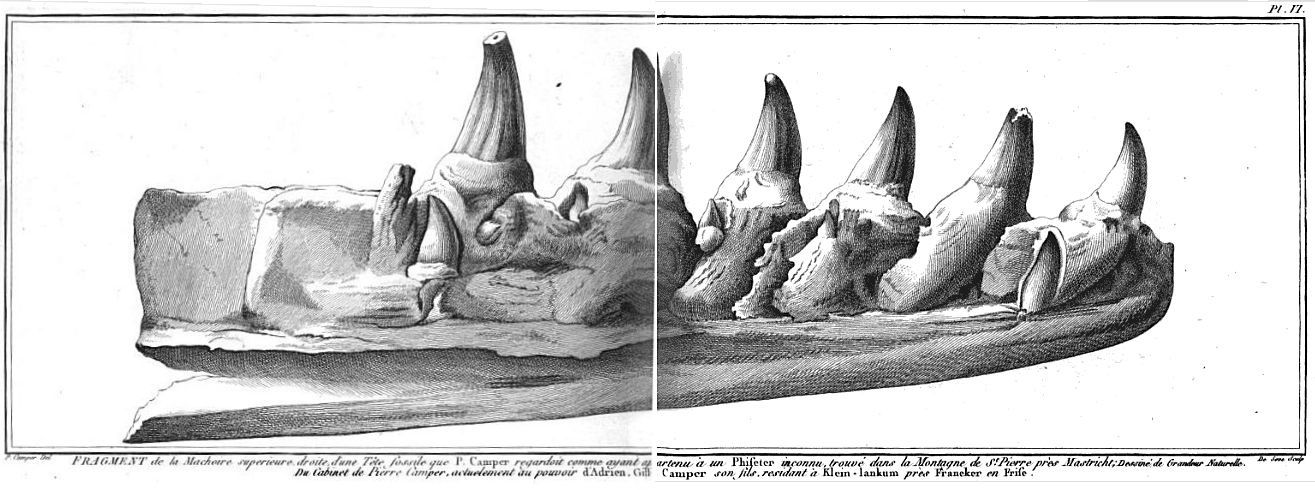
Camper was interested in the classification of all sorts of fossil discoveries, such as the Mosasaurus in Maastricht, which he inspected and drew in the 1770s. His drawings were later published by Barthélemy Faujas de Saint-Fond

One of the first to study comparative anatomy, Petrus Camper demonstrated the principle of correlation in all organisms by "metamorphosis". In his 1778 lecture, "On the Points of Similarity between the Human Species, Quadrupeds, Birds, and Fish; with Rules for Drawing, founded on this Similarity," he metamorphosed a horse into a human being, thus showing the similarity between all vertebrates. Étienne Geoffroy Saint-Hilaire theorised this in 1795 as the "unity of organic composition," the influence of which is perceptible in all his subsequent writings; nature, he observed, presents us with only one plan of construction, the same in principle, but varied in its accessory parts. Camper's metamorphoses which demonstrated this "unity of Plan" greatly impressed Diderot and Goethe. In 1923 and 1939 some Dutch authors suggested that Camper foreshadowed Goethe's famous idea of "type" – a common structural pattern in some manner

== "Facial angle" ==
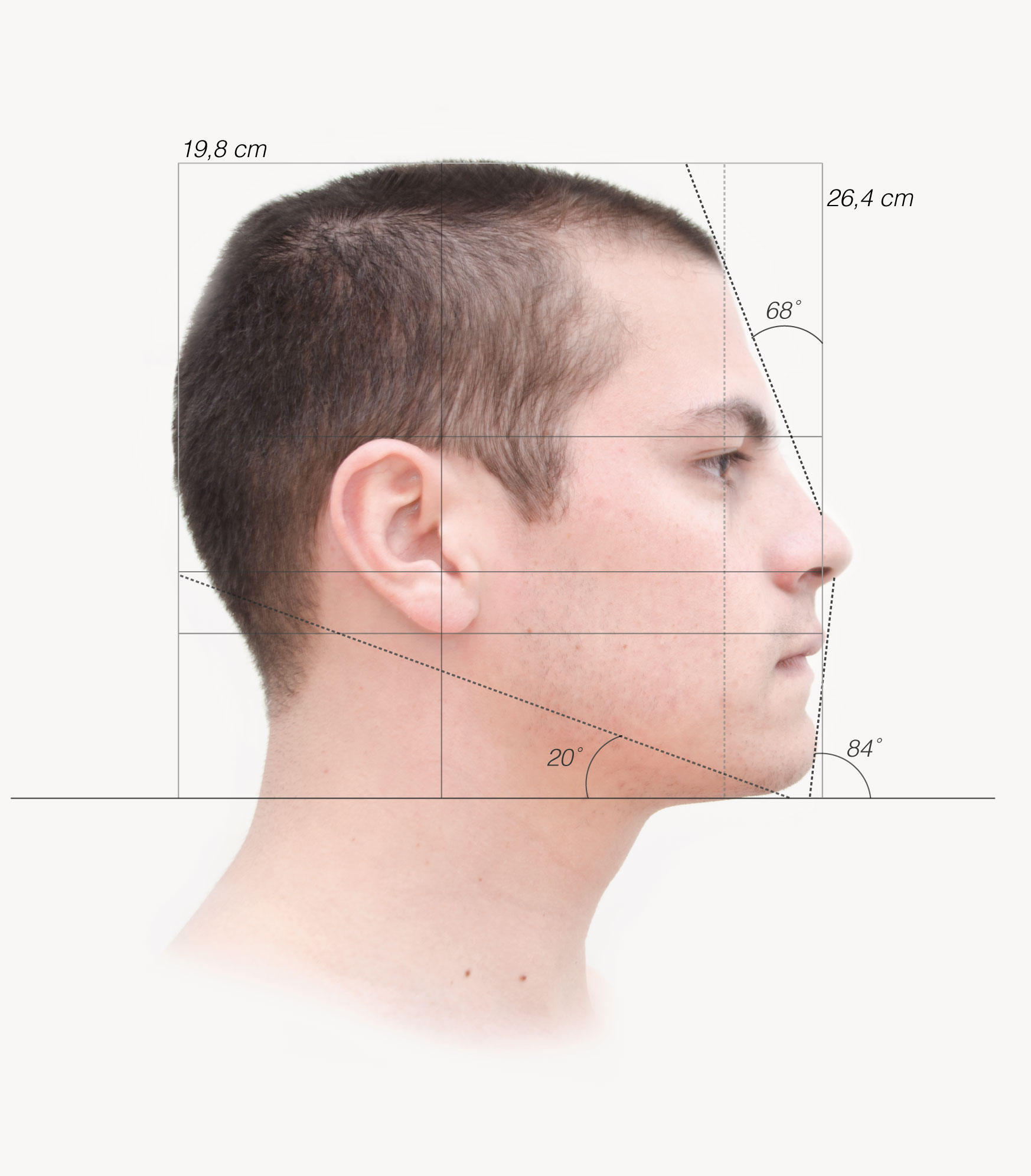
Picture of a human male based on Petrus Camper measurements

Petrus Camper is renowned for his theory of facial angle (prognathism). He determined that humans had facial angles between 70° and 80°, with African and Asian angles closer to 70°, and European angles closer to 80. According to his new portraiture technique, an angle is formed by drawing two lines: one horizontally from the nostril to the ear, and the other perpendicularly from the advancing part of the upper jawbone to the most prominent part of the forehead. He claimed that antique Greco-Roman statues presented an angle of 100°-95°, Europeans of 80°, 'Orientals' of 70°, Black people of 70° and the orangutan of 42–58°. He stated that, out of all races, Africans were most removed from the classical sense of ideal beauty. These results were later used as scientific racism, with research continued by Étienne Geoffroy Saint-Hilaire and Paul Broca.

Camper, however, agreed with Buffon in drawing a sharp line between human and animals (although he was misinterpreted by Diderot, who claimed that he was a supporter of the Great Chain of Being theory). Camper confirmed the categorizing species by Linné.

== Camper and the arts ==
He was interested in architecture, mathematics, furniture making, drawing and illustrated his own lectures. Four times he gave lectures in Amsterdam to art students, e.g. on beauty and portraiture. He disagreed that artists painted the black Magus (in the nativity) with a Caucasian face. In 1780 he took lessons from Étienne Maurice Falconet. In his ideas about art, Camper was influenced by Johann Joachim Winckelmann. He made drawings of the Dolmen near Noordlaren. He was in the selection committee for the prize contest for the design of the new townhall in Groningen that was awarded to his friend Jacob Otten Husly.

== Legacy ==
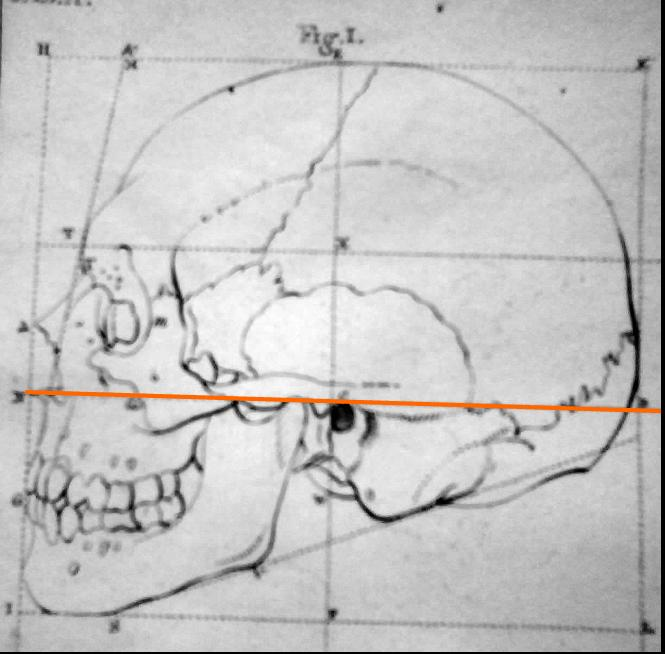
Abbildung der Camperschen Ebene basierend auf einem Kupferstich aus Peter Campers Werk Über den natürlichen Unterschied der Gesichtszüge in Menschen verschiedener Gegenden und verschiedenen Alters von 1792. Die Campersche Ebene ist orange hervorgehoben.

Georges Cuvier praised his "genius eye" but criticised him for keeping himself to simple sketches. He had a eulogy in his honour composed by Nicolas de Condorcet and Félix Vicq-d'Azyr. Camper influenced Louis-Jean-Marie Daubenton.

His son Adriaan Gilles Camper published much of his father's unpublished research in addition to a biography of him.

The Dutch author Thomas Rosenboom used Petrus Camper as a character in his novel, Gewassen vlees (1994).

Camper was elected to the American Philosophical Society in 1789.

== Works ==
- Petrus Camper (1746). "Dissertatio optica de visu" (PDF). Dissertation from Leiden University.
- Demonstrationes anatomico- pathologicae [1760–1762]
- Dissertation sur les différences des traits du visage and Discours sur l'art de juger les passions de l'homme par les traits de son visage
- On the Best Form of Shoe
- Two lectures to the Amsterdam Drawing society on the facial angle (1770)
- On the Points of Similarity between the Human Species, Quadrupeds, Birds, and Fish; with Rules for Drawing, founded on this Similarity (1778)
- Historiae literariae cultoribus S.P.D. Petrus Camper. A list of his work, published by himself.
- Works by Petrus Camper, the French compilation of Camper's work, based on Camper's French lecture notes and the posthumous publications by his son A.G. Camper, published and partially translated by Hendrik Jansen in 1803 in three octavo volumes.
