= Adriaan Gilles Camper =

Dutch mathematician, physicist, and politician

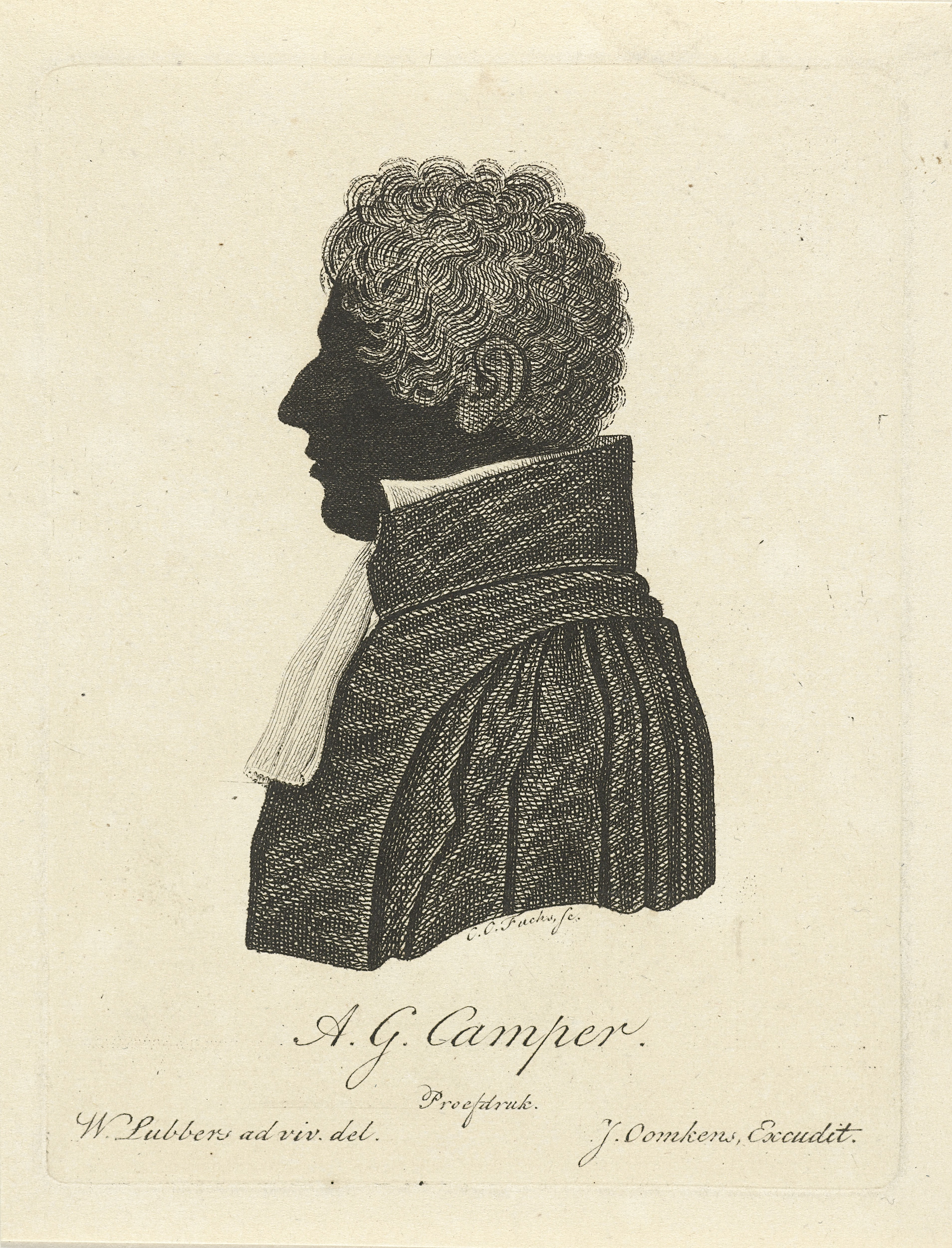
Adriaan Gilles Camper.

Adriaan Gilles Camper (March 31, 1759 – February 5, 1820) was a 19th-century Dutch mathematics and physics professor at the University of Franeker who took to politics and became a statesman in his later years. He was the son of Petrus Camper is known today primarily for his paleontological work in collaboration with his father, causing several fossil holotypes to be named after him, such as the Puppigerus P. Camperi. The engravings he commissioned on the basis of his father's work were published by Barthélemy Faujas de Saint-Fond. He himself wrote several books on paleontology, including a catalog of his collection of fossils and minerals.

His daughter Frederica married one of his pupils in Franeker, the Dutch geologist J.G.S. van Breda (who later became curator of the Teylers Museum in Haarlem). Van Breda wrote a biography of father-in-law, in which he describes him as the home-schooled wunderkind who entered the University of Franeker at age 14 already learned in natural history and modern languages from his close association with his father. Three years later, in 1776, his mother died, and his father was so struck by the loss that he undertook a leave of absence from the university to travel to Paris and the young Adriaan went with him. There due to the fame of his father, they were received with open arms by the various learned societies such as the French Academy of Sciences and consorted with Louis, Antoine Portal, Jacques-René Tenon, Julien-David Le Roy, the Count Jean-Charles de Borda, the Marquis de Condorcet, and Benjamin Franklin (the American liberator).

He became member of the Royal Institute of the Netherlands in 1808.
