= Pieter Nieuwland =

Dutch scientist (1764–1794)

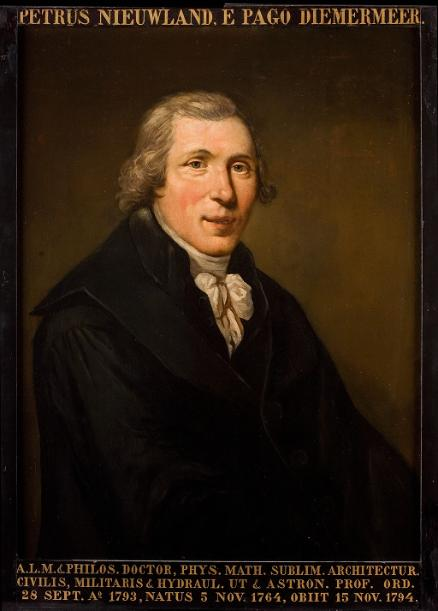
Leiden University's professorial portrait of Pieter Nieuwland of 1793-1794, in the Special Collections of the Leiden University Library

Pieter Nieuwland (5 November 1764, Diemermeer – 14 November 1794, Leiden) was a Dutch nautical scientist, chemist, mathematician, and poet. During his life he was known as a child prodigy and has been called the Dutch Isaac Newton.

== Early life and studies ==
Nieuwland was born as the son of the carpenter Barend Nieuwland (already 56 years old at the time) and his wife Marretje Klinkert. Even at a young age he had a great curiosity and a strong memory. His father began teaching him mathematics, but the young Pieter soon outpaced his father, and the mathematician Henricus Aeneae continued his education.

Nieuwland wrote poems at the age of seven, and his genius attracted the attention of the wealthy brothers De Bosch, who had a country house in the Watergraafsmeer. They set themselves up as patrons for the boy, financed his studies at the Athenaeum Illustre of Amsterdam, and Jeronimo de Bosch personally taught him Latin. At the athenaeum he followed the teaching of the Literature Professor Herman Tollius, translated several Greek and Latin works into Dutch, and wrote and defended a thesis on the Stoic philosopher Gaius Musonius Rufus. Following his education at the atheneum he studied at Leiden University.

== Academic career ==
In 1788 Nieuwland published his first bundle of poetry. In 1789, he became lector in mathematics, astronomy, and nautical sciences at the University of Amsterdam. At the end of 1790, he helped found the Gezelschap der Hollandsche Scheikundigen ("Society of Dutch Chemists"), a group that lasted only ten years but provided early support for Antoine Laurent Lavoisier's work in chemistry. The other founders included Nicolaas Bondt, merchant Adriaan Paets van Troostwijk and physician Jan Rudolph Deiman.

On July 24, 1791, Nieuwland married Anna Hartigina Pruijssenaar (born 27 July 1770). Anna died only 9 months later in child birth, on 29 March 1792, while their newborn daughter died two days later. This sad event inspired Nieuwland to write one of his better known poems, Ter Gedachtenisse van mijne Echtgenoote ("In memory of my wife"). To soften the blow, the University of Amsterdam gave him leave to go on a sabbatical to Germany that summer. Among others he visited Franz Xaver von Zach, with whom he did some surveying studies around Gotha in September.

On June 1, 1793, Nieuwland was appointed as a professor in mathematics, physics and astronomy at Leiden University. That year he also published a book on nautical sciences. Before or around this time, Nieuwland had found the largest cube that can pass through a hole in a unit cube, a problem that had been posed 100 years earlier by Prince Rupert of the Rhine and given an inferior solution by English mathematician John Wallis. Nieuwland's solution was found among his papers after he died, and published in 1816 by his mentor Jan Hendrik van Swinden.

After five days of sudden severe illness, Nieuwland died on November 14, 1794. He was buried in Diemen on the 24th, on which occasion van Swinden delivered a lengthy eulogy.

== Legacy ==
The Mathematics Genealogy Project lists Nieuwland as being the doctoral advisor of one student at Leiden, Simon Speijert van der Eyk, through whom he has over 600 academic descendants.

In his birthplace, the secondary school Pieter Nieuwland College is named after him.

== Bibliography ==
- Pieter Nieuwland at the Digital Library for Dutch Literature
