= Teylers Instrument Room =

Room in Teylers Museum, Haarlem, Netherlands

Teylers Museum rooms

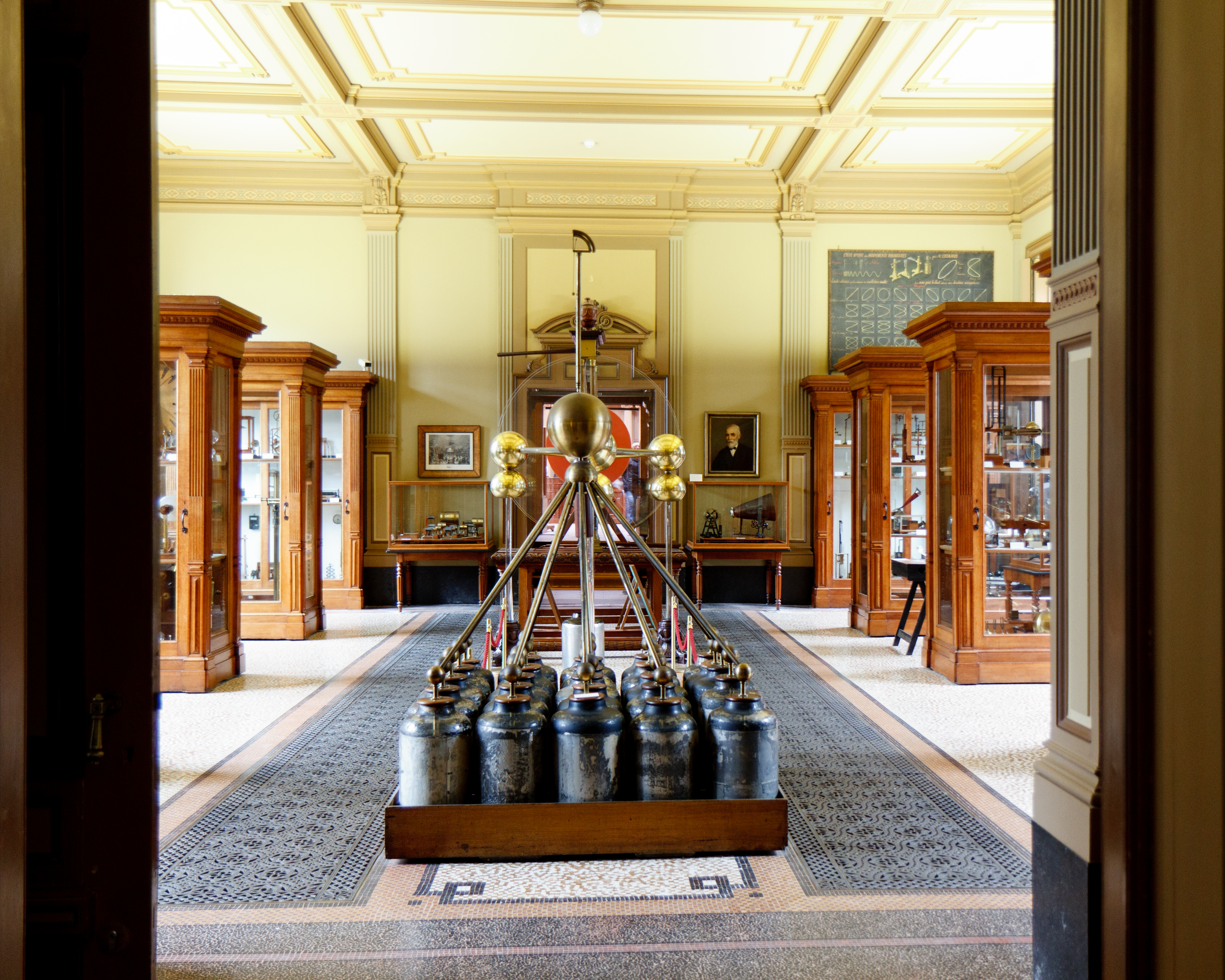
Instrument Room taken from the doorway to the Fossil room 2, with leyden jars in the foreground

The Instrument Room is a room in Teylers Museum which houses a part of the museum's Cabinet of Physics: a collection of scientific instruments from the 18th and 19th centuries. The instruments in the collection were used for research as well as for educational public demonstrations. Most of them are demonstration models that illustrate various aspects of electricity, acoustics, light, magnetism, thermodynamics, and weights and measures. The rest are high-quality precision instruments that were used for research.

== History of the room ==
Originally all of the museum's collections were housed in the Oval Room from 1784. The electricity instrument demonstrations tended to make a lot of noise and distracted the readers of the books in the gallery, and after the mineralogical cabinet was built for the center of the room, demonstrations there became more difficult and a new demonstration and lecture room was built on the north side (today the Print room). This new room shared its purpose with the art gallery but as the number of instrument cabinets increased, was felt to be too dark, leading to the creation of a separate painting gallery in 1838. The current instrument room was built as part of an 1880-1885 extension of the museum, designed to have daylight from both sides for better viewing of the experiments. It is located between the Fossil Room II and the Oval Room.

== History of the collection ==
Though Pieter Teyler van der Hulst was a patron of the arts and sciences, he was not a member of the Natuur- en Sterrekundig Collegie, a science society in Haarlem that was founded in the Patientiestraat in 1775. The popularity of the study of science and the ideals of the Dutch enlightenment were such that after his death however, when Martin van Marum joined the young Teylers Stichting, this proved quickly to become the emphasis of the society in the years to come. Teylers Museum was not alone. The society Oefening door Wetenschappen was also started in Haarlem in 1798 and lasted until 1892. It was Haarlem's reputation for the study of science that attracted Van Marum to settle there. When he became director of the collection of the Koninklijke Hollandsche Maatschappij der Wetenschappen in 1778 and later, also of Teylers in 1784, he used the funds of both institutions to purchase expensive instruments and even whole scientific collections from personal estates. He started before he even worked there with a proposal to build his large elektriseermachine that forms the center attraction of the instrument room. Van Marum was not only the curator of the cabinet, he gave public laboratorium lectures from 1777 to 1803 on physics and geology. The number of demonstration models in the collection is directly related to his and his successors' need for demonstration models in Teylers lectures. Van Marum collected 350 demonstration models and set a precedent as lecturer-demonstrator for curators who came after him. Today there are over a thousand in the collection altogether.

== Instruments on display ==
The centerpiece of the Instrument Room is the large electrostatic generator built by John Cuthbertson in 1784. This apparatus is the largest flat-plate electrostatic generator of the world and the oldest piece in the room itself, which is filled mostly with items from the 19th century. Surrounding this centerpiece are 10 numbered cabinets filled with instruments accompanied by numbered cards that can be cross-referenced to a guide located in the room.

Name	Year	Maker	Image
Astronomical time-keeper		Andreas Hohwü	
Sound analyser with 8 resonator balls	1860s	Rudolph Koenig	
Synthesizer	1865	after Hermann von Helmholtz by Koenig	
Synthesizer after Helmholtz	1865	after Helmholtz by Koenig	
Wire cable display case		Guglielmo Marconi	
Cabinet I: thermometry heat conduction			
Cabinet I			
Cabinet II - measuring instruments (lower shelf)			
Polytrope		G.E. Sire	
Cabinet III: electricity			
Cabinet III			
Cabinet III			
Cabinet III			
Cabinet III			
Cabinet III			
absolute electrometer	1883	Thomson by Breguet	
Conductors (isolated with glass) to demonstrate the strength of electric charges don't depend on sphere size	1840		
small cylinder electrostatic generator	1856	Jean Claude Eugène Péclet	
1860 spark measurer and 1865 discharger for spectroscope	1860-5		
gold leaf electrometer	1866		
induction machine	1888	James Wimshurst	
electroscope	1912	Franz S. Exner	
spark duration demonstrator	1859		
electroscope	1870		
discharge points	1890		
The small electricity machine developed by Martin van Marum as a student		Gerhard Kuyper	
Cabinet IV: Telegraphy			
commutator for Telegraph	1865		
contact breaker	1865		
philips lightbulbs			
Wireless telegraphy receiver	1897	Guglielmo Marconi	
Cabinet V: geomagnetics and Geissler			
Gas discharge tube with holder by Ducretet and Lejeune	1862	Heinrich Geißler	
Universal geomagnetic instrument	1877	after Moritz Meyerstein & Henry Barrow	
X-ray tube	1930		
Cabinet VII: optics			
reading telescopes	1865	Carl August von Steinheil	
uranium glass objects 1861 and photometer 1870	1861-1870		
Cabinet VIII: acoustics			
Cabinet VIII - sound			
Cabinet VIII - sound			
Cabinet VIII - sound			
Cabinet IX - sound			
Cabinet IX - sound			
Cabinet IX			
Graphophone by Columbia Phonograph Company	1897	CBC	
Three almost identical telephone sets after Bell end of 19th century	c.1880	Alexander Graham Bell	
Cabinet X: Heat, carbon arc lamps			
Cabinet X			
galvanometer		Leopoldo Nobili	
