= Van Swinden =

Van Swinden may refer to:

- Jean Henri van Swinden (1746–1823), a Dutch mathematician
- 10440 van Swinden, a minor planet
