= Henricus Aeneae =

Dutch scientist

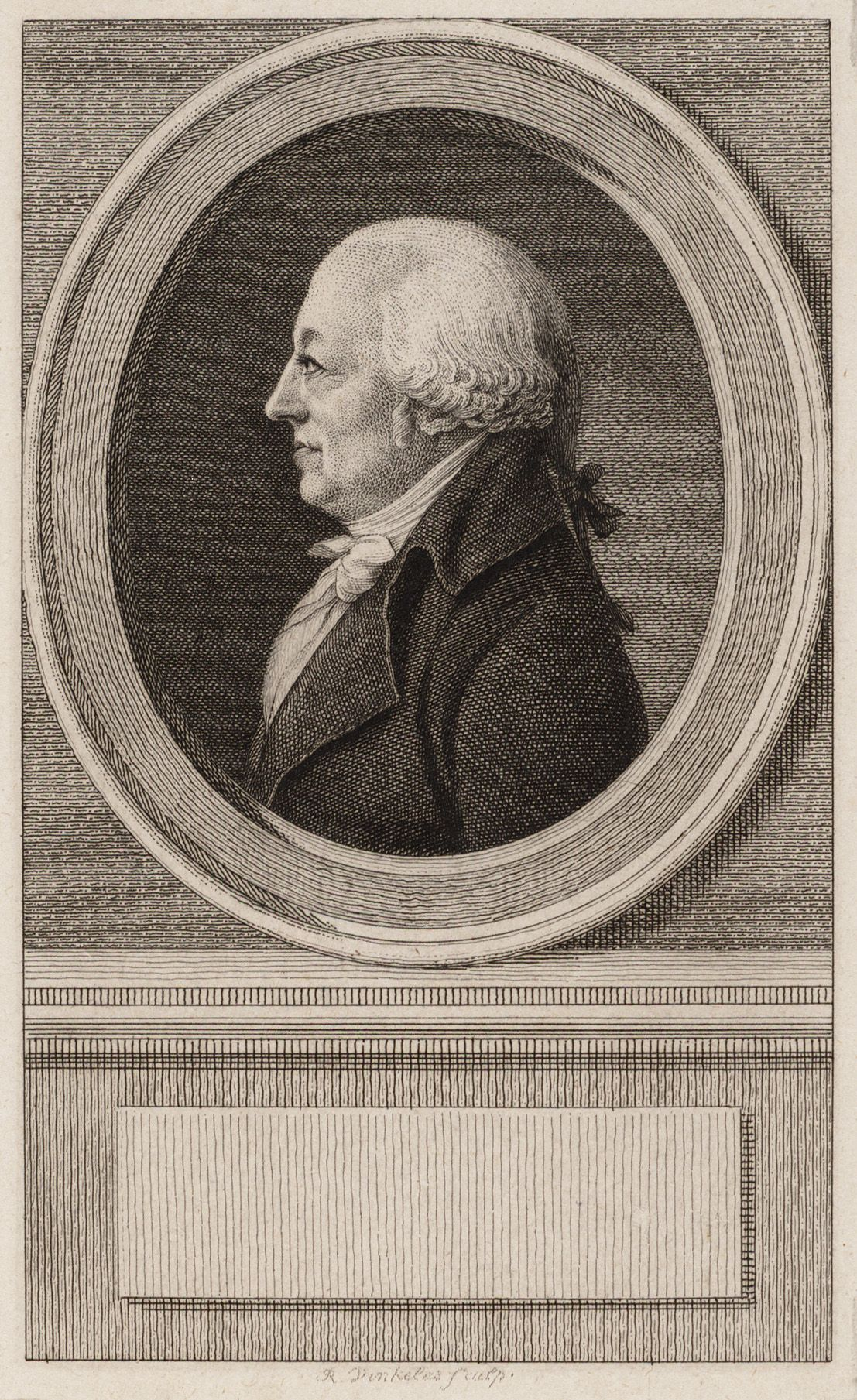
Henricus Aeneae

Henricus Aeneae (born Henricus Aenee, 19 August 1743 – 1 November 1810) was a Dutch scientist and mathematician.

== Biography ==
Henricus Aeneae was born 19 August 1743 at Oudemirdum, Friesland, where his father Eduard Schultetus Aenee was a minister. The son, on the advice of the rector of the Latin schools, added a Latin ending to his name and called himself from then on Aeneae, was initially prepared to become a teacher, visiting the Latin schools in Leeuwarden and the college of Franeker. At the latter location, he studied mathematics and physics with the professors Nicolaas Ypeij and Antonius Brugmans; he enjoyed these sciences so much that he decided to devote himself to them. Guided by the famous Jan van der Bildt, who was at the time partly living in Franeker, and by Wytze Foppes, who lived in Dongjum, half an hour away from Franeker, he practised making binoculars and telescopes, driven as he was by his interest in optics.

Because he was meanwhile married and thus needed some means of living, he went in 1767 to Amsterdam, where he taught mathematics, with among his pupils the great Nieuwland. Two years after his arrival in Amsterdam, he was promoted to Master in the Free Arts and Doctor in Philosophy in Leiden, with a dissertation on frost.

In 1778, the company Felix Meritis made him an honorary member and their Lector or Physics because of his capacities and ever increasing fame: because Aeneae not only became famous by his great progress in physics and mathematics and especially in optics and mechanics, but especially by his methods of teaching. In this he was truly unique and his merits where above all praise. With the utmost clarity and simplicity and in an enjoyable manner he taught physics, while a more than normal dexterity made his experiments extremely important.

Until the revolution of 1795, Aeneae only occupied himself with teaching his beloved sciences, but then he was swiftly called to aid his country with his capacities. Immediately after the revolution, he became a member of the Committee of the Marine, and not long thereafter he was given, together with the captains Story and Lucas and ship builder Glavimans, the honorable task of inspecting all warships in these countries on their ability of being brought into service. Even more all encompassing was the job he was called to in 1798, when he received the honour to go together with professor Jan Hendrik van Swinden to Paris, to deliberate about the metric system of measures and weights together with the most prominent French and other scientists, which was eventually mostly brought to its current perfection by these two Dutchmen.

After being remade a member of the Marine in 1801, and later Advisor in mathematics, physics, chemistry and mechanics, Inspector of measures and weights, and member of the Central Committee of the Marine, he died in The Hague on November 1, 1810.

Among his works are:

- "Wiskundige Beschouwing van een hellend waterscheprad, door A.G. Eckhardt uitgevonden", Amsterdam 1775, 8o. 2 parts, illustrated
- "Verhandeling over de Molenwieken in het algemeen en over die, welke eene schroefwijze gedaante hebben, volgens de uitvinding van Jan van Deyl en Zoon", Amsterdam 1785, 8o.
- "Rekenboek voor de Nederlandsche jeugd, uitgegeven door de Maatschappij Tot Nut van 't Algemeen", Amsterdam 1792, 2 parts.
- "Iets over de waterweegkunde", Amsterdam 1808.

Aeneae was a member of all learned societies in the Netherlands which only present membership as an appreciation of merit. The first to bring this honour were the Zeeuws and Provinciaal Utrechts Genootschap, followed by the Hollandsche Maatschappij der Wetenschappen in Haarlem and the Genootschap der Proefondervindelijke Wijsbegeerte in Rotterdam. He was a contributing member of the Genoolschap der Proefondervindelijke Natuurkunde at The Hague since 1800, and he was one of the first members of the Royal Netherlands Academy of Arts and Sciences.
