= Hieronymus van Bosch =

Hieronymus van Bosch may refer to:

- Hieronymus de Bosch (1740–1811), Latin scholar and poet from the Netherlands
- Hieronymus Bosch (1450–1516), Dutch painter
