= Abraham de Vries =

Abraham de Vries may refer to:

- Abraham de Vries (painter) (c. 1590 – c. 1655), Dutch painter
- Abraham de Vries (minister) (1773–1862), Dutch minister and member of Teylers Eerste Genootschap
- Abraham H. de Vries (born 1937), South-African author
