= Assembly of Notables (Netherlands) =

Constitutient assembly in the Netherlands

The Assembly of Notables (Dutch: Vergadering van notabelen) was the constituent assembly of the Sovereign Principality of the United Netherlands. They met on 29 March 1814 in the New Church in Amsterdam. Sovereign Prince William I of the Netherlands had invited 600 notables for the assembly, 474 of whom showed up. Only 26 of those present voted against the new Constitution.

== Members ==
The notables were selected per French department, which the Netherlands was still using after the Incorporation of the Netherlands. The departments were: Bouches-de-l'Escaut, (Dutch: Monden van de Schelde), Ems-Occidental (Dutch: Wester Eems), Bouches-de-l'Yssel (Dutch: Monden van de IJssel), Bouches-de-la-Meuse (Dutch: Monden van de Maas), Bouches-du-Rhin (Dutch: Monden van de Rijn), Frise (Dutch: Friesland), Yssel-Supérieur (Dutch: Boven IJssel) and Zuyderzée (Dutch: Zuiderzee).

Members of the Assembly of Notables
Name (Note: The precise name changes between sources. If available, the name from Repertorium van ambtsdragers en ambtenaren 1428-1861 is used.)	Department	Vote	Ref.
Johan Daniël Cornelis Carel Willem d'Ablaing van Giessenburg	Zuiderzee	Favour	
Hendrik Jacob Ackersdijck	Monden van de Rijn	Favour	
Barro Adema	Friesland	Favour	
Willem Albarda	Friesland	Favour	
Gerhard Alberda van Menkema	Wester Eems	Favour	
Onno Tamminga Alberda van Rensuma	Wester Eems	Favour	
W.P. de Roo van Aldewerelt	Monden van de Maas	Absent	
Willem Alewijn	Zuiderzee	Favour	
Berend Alring	Friesland	Favour	
Arnoldus Ameshoff	Zuiderzee	Against	
Hugo van Andel	Monden van de Maas	Favour	
Simon Cornelis van Appeltere	Monden van de Maas	Favour	
Gerrit Ferdinand van Asbeck	Friesland	Favour	
Justus Hendrik Ludovicus d'Aulnis de Bourouill	Wester Eems	Favour	
Anthony Backer	Zuiderzee	Favour	
Pieter Baelde	Monden van de Maas	Favour	
Harmen Bakker	Zuiderzee	Favour	
Nicolaas le Balleur	Boven-IJssel	Favour	
Sipco Basseleur	Friesland	Favour	
P. van Bauren	Monden van de Maas	Absent	
Willem Hendrik de Beaufort	Zuiderzee	Favour	
Pieter Beelaerts	Monden van de Maas	Favour	
Rudolf Floris Carel Bentinck	Monden van de IJssel	Favour	
Volkier Rudolph Bentinck	Monden van de IJssel	Favour	
Adolf Carel Bentinck	Monden van de IJssel	Favour	
Otto Willem Johan Berg	Zuiderzee	Favour	
Anthony Hendrik van den Bergh van Lexmond	Zuiderzee	Favour	
Johannes Casparus Bergsma	Friesland	Favour	
Jan Pieter Teding van Berkhout	Zuiderzee	Favour	
Josephus Christophorus Bernardus Bernard	Zuiderzee	Favour	
Gijsbert van Beverwijk	Monden van de Rijn	Favour	
Marinus Cornelis Bichon van IJsselmonde	Monden van de Maas	Favour	
Henric Bicker	Zuiderzee	Favour	
David Bierens	Zuiderzee	Favour	
Salomon Reynders Bisdom	Monden van de Maas	Favour	
Dirk Rudolph Wijckerheld Bisdom	Monden van de Maas	Favour	
J.C. Blanckenhagen	Zuiderzee	Absent	
C.J. Blankenheim	Monden van de Maas	Absent	
Hugo Adriaan van Bleyswijck	Zuiderzee	Favour	
J.C. van de Blocquerij	Zuiderzee	Absent	
Cornelis Ysaac Bloys van Treslong	Monden van de Maas	Favour	
Lodewijk Theodorus Johannes van Boecop	Monden van de Rijn	Favour	
Ambrozius Ayzo van Boelens	Friesland	Favour	
Dirk van Boetzelaer	Monden van de Maas	Favour	
Pieter Alexander van Boetzelaer	Zuiderzee	Favour	
Johan Schuurbeque Boeye	Monden van de Schelde	Favour	
B. van den Bogaart	Monden van de Maas	Absent	
Petrus Johannes van Bommel	Monden van de Rijn	Against	
Jan Bondt	Zuiderzee	Favour	
Bartholomeus van den Boogaert	Monden van de Maas	Favour	
J. Boreel van Hogelanden	Zuiderzee	Absent	
B. van den Bogaart	Monden van de Maas	Absent	
C. van Borcharen	Monden van de Maas	Absent	
Cornelis Bormeester	Zuiderzee	Favour	
Antonius Josephus Lambertus Borret	Monden van de Rijn	Against	
Anthony Willem van Borssele	Boven-IJssel	Favour	
Arnold Hendrik van Markel Bouwer	Boven-IJssel	Favour	
Hugo Bowier	Monden van de Rijn	Favour	
Otto Braet	Zuiderzee	Favour	
Diederik Louis van Brakell tot den Brakell	Boven-IJssel	Favour	
Willem Brand	Monden van de Rijn	Favour	
Johan Brantsen	Boven-IJssel	Favour	
F.L. Braunsberg	Zuiderzee	Absent	
Willem Maurits de Brauw	Monden van de Schelde	Favour	
Johannes Breur	Monden van de Maas	Favour	
Jeronimus Bricheau	Boven-IJssel	Favour	
A. van Brienen van de Groote Lindt	Zuiderzee	Absent	
Gijsbert Carel Rutger Reinier van Brienen van Ramerus	Zuiderzee	Favour	
Marcus Broen	Zuiderzee	Favour	
Johannes Brouwer	Zuiderzee	Favour	
Johannes Brouwers	Monden van de Rijn	Against	
Johan Carel Gideon van der Brugghen	Monden van de Rijn	Favour	
Dirk Willem van der Brugghen van Kermesteyn	Boven-IJssel	Favour	
Bernhardus Buma	Friesland	Favour	
Jan Arend van der Burch	Monden van de Maas	Favour	
Daniel Gerard van der Burgh	Zuiderzee	Favour	
J.A. van der Burgh	Monden van de Maas	Absent	
Cornelius Julius van Burmania	Friesland	Favour	
H. Burnev It van Noordeloos	Monden van de Maas	Absent	
Pieter Buteux	Monden van de Schelde	Favour	
Willem Frederik van Bylandt	Monden van de Rijn	Favour	
Frederik Sigismund van Bylandt	Boven-IJssel	Favour	
Nicolaas Calkoen	Zuiderzee	Favour	
H.A. Caan	Monden van de Maas	Absent	
Daniël Jacobus Canter Camerling	Zuiderzee	Favour	
Adriaan Gilles Camper	Friesland	Favour	
Johan Fredrik Benjamin van der Capellen	Boven-IJssel	Favour	
Henrick Carbasius	Zuiderzee	Favour	
Leonard de Casembroot	Zuiderzee	Favour	
Pieter Cats	Friesland	Favour	
Marinus Anthonie Catshoek	Monden van de Schelde	Favour	
Johannes Ludovicus Maria Cavellier van Adrichem	Zuiderzee	Favour	
J.B. van Ceulen	Zuiderzee	Absent	
Petrus Paulus Charlé	Zuiderzee	Favour	
Laurens de Witte van Citters	Monden van de Schelde	Favour	
Hendrik Nicolaas la Clé	Wester-Eems	Favour	
George Clifford	Zuiderzee	Favour	
Jacob van Collen	Zuiderzee	Favour	
Carel Emilius Els Collot d'Escury	Friesland	Favour	
Hendrik Collot d'Escury	Monden van de Maas	Favour	
Martinus Gerard del Court	Monden van de Maas	Favour	
Paulus Emanuel Antonius de la Court	Monden van de Rijn	Against	
Adolph Hendrik Cramer	Monden van de IJssel	Favour	
Wilhelmus Christianus de Crane	Monden van de Schelde	Favour	
Hendrik Constantijn Cras	Zuiderzee	Favour	
Hendrik Frederik Cremer	Boven-IJssel	Favour	
Jan Pieter van Wickevoort Crommelin	Zuiderzee	Favour	
Evert Hendrik Jacob Cunaeus	Monden van de Maas	Favour	
Angelus Jacobus Cuperus	Zuiderzee	Favour	
Marten Adriaen Daey	Zuiderzee	Favour	
François van Harencarspel Decker	Monden van de Maas	Favour	
Pieter Samuel Dedel	Zuiderzee	Favour	
Johan Albert van Dedem	Boven-IJssel	Favour	
Willem Jan van Dedem	Monden van de IJssel	Favour	
Andries Adolph Deutz van Assendelft	Zuiderzee	Favour	
Huibert Jan van Deventer	Zuiderzee	Favour	
Johannes Nicolaas Diert van Leefdael	Monden van de Maas	Favour	
Herman Jacob Dijckmeester	Boven-IJssel	Favour	
Adriaan van der Does	Monden van de Maas	Favour	
C. Dommer	Zuiderzee	Absent	
Reinierus Engelbertus van Dorth tot Medler	Boven-IJssel	Against	
Frederik Lodewijk Ferdinand van Drachstett	Boven-IJssel	Favour	
Joan Jacob Duyvensz	Zuiderzee	Favour	
Jan Carel van Eck	Boven-IJssel	Favour	
Roelof Eekhout	Monden van de IJssel	Favour	
David Willem Elias	Zuiderzee	Favour	
Gerbrand Faas Elias	Zuiderzee	Favour	
Gerard Abraham van den Ende	Monden van de Maas	Favour	
Willem Engelen	Boven-IJssel	Favour	
Willem Engelbert Engelen	Boven-IJssel	Favour	
Cornelis Cromstrien Evertsen	Monden van de Schelde	Favour	
Paulus Andries van Eys	Zuiderzee	Favour	
Jan Nicolaas van Eys	Zuiderzee	Favour	
Jacob Fagel	Monden van de Maas	Favour	
Herman Roelf Wolf van der Feltz	Monden van de IJssel	Favour	
Cornelis van Foreest	Zuiderzee	Favour	
Diderik van Leyden Gael	Monden van de Maas	Favour	
Jan Jacob Gansneb genaamd Tengnagel	Monden van de IJssel	Favour	
Arnold Antoni Gaymans	Boven-IJssel	Favour	
Statius Georg Geertsema van Sjallema	Wester-Eems	Favour	
de Geert van Rhijnhuisen	Zuiderzee	Absent	
Gerardus van Gennep	Monden van de Maas	Favour	
Cornelis Gerlings	Zuiderzee	Favour	
Sikko Gerlsma	Friesland	Favour	
Paulus Gevaerts	Monden van de Maas	Favour	
Willem Theodore Gevers Deynoot	Monden van de Maas	Favour	
Hugo Gevers	Monden van de Maas	Favour	
Otto Willem Gobius	Zuiderzee	Favour	
Godfried Carel Gockinga	Wester-Eems	Favour	
Cornelis van der Goes	Monden van de Maas	Favour	
Frank van der Goes	Monden van de Rijn	Favour	
Philip Jacob van der Goes	Monden van de Maas	Favour	
Johan Goll van Franckenstein	Zuiderzee	Favour	
Frederik Adriaan van der Goltz	Monden van de Maas	Favour	
Joan Graafland	Zuiderzee	Favour	
Graswinkel	Zuiderzee	Absent	
Hendrikus Willem Greven	Monden van de IJssel	Favour	
Petrus Jacobus Groen van Prinsterer	Monden van de Maas	Favour	
Otto Paulus Groeninx van Zoelen	Monden van de Maas	Favour	
Ernestus Jodocus Rudolphus van Grotenhuis van Onstein	Boven-IJssel	Favour	
Jan Ernst Polman Gruys	Wester-Eems	Favour	
Olivier Gerrit Willem Joseph Hacfort tot ter Horst	Boven-IJssel	Against	
Daniël Bonifacius van der Haer	Friesland	Favour	
Sybrand van Haersma	Friesland	Favour	
Hans Hendrik van Haersma	Zuiderzee	Favour	
Antony Coenraad Willem van Haersolte	Monden van de IJssel	Favour	
Petrus Haesebroeck	Boven-IJssel	Favour	
Tjepke Haitsma	Friesland	Favour	
Jacob Willem Half-Wassenaer	Monden van de Rijn	Favour	
Jan Simon Hallungius	Monden van de Rijn	Favour	
Daniel van Halteren	Monden van de Maas	Favour	
Willem Hendrik van Thije Hannes	Monden van de Rijn	Favour	
Gijsbert Carel Duco van Hardenbroek	Zuiderzee	Favour	
Danker Amijs Haringman	Monden van de Schelde	Favour	
Albertus van Harinxma thoe Slooten	Friesland	Favour	
Jan Adriaan de Hasselgreen	Zuiderzee	Favour	
Jan Hendrik van Hasselt	Boven-IJssel	Favour	
Bernaventura Sebastianus Josephus Havermans	Monden van de Rijn	Against	
Ludolph van Heeckeren	Boven-IJssel	Favour	
Evert Christiaan Carel Willem van Heeckeren	Boven-IJssel	Favour	
Evert Frederik van Heeckeren	Boven-IJssel	Favour	
Walraven Robbert van Heeckeren van Brandsenburg	Zuiderzee	Favour	
Cornelis Scheltinga van Heemstra	Friesland	Favour	
Willem Hendrik van Heerdt tot Eversberg	Monden van de IJssel	Favour	
Pieter de Heere	Monden van de Maas	Favour	
Cornelis Heereman	Monden van de Maas	Favour	
François van Hees	Monden van de Maas	Favour	
Sigismund Jacques van Heiden Reinestein	Wester-Eems	Favour	
P.L. Heilman van Stoutenburg	Zuiderzee	Absent	
Daniël Michiel Gijsbert Heldewier	Monden van de Maas	Favour	
Michaël Helmich	Monden van de IJssel	Favour	
Jacob Constantijn Helmolt	Zuiderzee	Favour	
Wolf Floris van Hemert tot Dingshof	Monden van de IJssel	Favour	
Jan Both Hendriksen	Zuiderzee	Against	
Cornelis Maria van Hengst	Zuiderzee	Favour	
Jan van Heukelom	Monden van de Maas	Favour	
Lodewijk Willem Ernst van Heurn	Monden van de Rijn	Favour	
Martinus Johannes Josephus van den Heuvel	Monden van de Rijn	Against	
Hendrik Adriaan van den Heuvel	Zuiderzee	Favour	
Hendrik Luidwijn van Linden van den Heuvel	Monden van de Maas	Favour	
Judocus Henricus Antonius Adrianus Josephus Joannes van der Heyden	Boven-IJssel	Favour	
Hendricus Petrus van der Heyden	Monden van de Rijn	Against	
Jan van Goor Hinlopen	Zuiderzee	Favour	
Albertus Hodshon	Zuiderzee	Favour	
Jan Hodshon	Zuiderzee	Favour	
Jacob Hendrik Hoeufft	Monden van de Rijn	Favour	
Jacob Pompejus Hoeufft	Zuiderzee	Against	
Leonard Pauw geboren Hoeufft	Zuiderzee	Favour	
Jan Willem van der Cruysse van Hoey	Monden van de Maas	Favour	
Jan Pieter van Hoey	Monden van de Rijn	Favour	
Johan Frederic Hoffmann	Monden van de Maas	Favour	
Petrus Hofstede	Wester-Eems	Favour	
Diederik Johan François van Hogendorp	Monden van de Rijn	Favour	
Johan François van Hogendorp	Monden van de Maas	Favour	
Paul Iwan Hogguer	Zuiderzee	Favour	
Niclaas Holmberg de Beckfelt	Monden van de Maas	Favour	
Adriaan van Holst	Monden van de Maas	Favour	
Rudolph Otto van Holthe	Wester-Eems	Favour	
Johannes Linthorst Homan	Wester-Eems	Favour	
J.C. Honig	Zuiderzee	Absent	
Gerrit Lodewijk Hendrik Hooft	Monden van de Maas	Favour	
D. Hoof	Zuiderzee	Absent	
Marinus Hoog	Monden van de Maas	Favour	
Adriaan van der Hoop	Zuiderzee	Favour	
Pieter Theodoor van Hoorn	Zuiderzee	Favour	
Archibald Hope	Monden van de Maas	Favour	
Henricus Hoppenbrouwers	Monden van de Rijn	Favour	
Gijsbert Johan Hoppesteyn	Monden van de Maas	Favour	
Lambertus Wilhelmus van der Horst	Monden van de Rijn	Against	
Pieter Houttuyn	Zuiderzee	Favour	
Arnoldus Joannes Anthonius van Hövell tot Westerflier	Boven-IJssel	Favour	
Hendrik Hovy	Zuiderzee	Against	
Willem Hoyer	Monden van de Maas	Favour	
Marinus Perpetuus Adriaan Roos van Hoytema	Monden van de Maas	Favour	
Isaäc Hubert	Monden van de Maas	Favour	
Godefridus Franciscus Antonius Henricus Cornelius van Hugenpoth tot Aerdt	Boven-IJssel	Favour	
Anne Hendricus Hummelinck	Boven-IJssel	Favour	
Joan Huydecoper	Zuiderzee	Favour	
Martinus Huysmans	Monden van de Rijn	Favour	
Jean François van Iddekinge	Wester-Eems	Favour	
Tjaerd Anthony van Iddekinge	Zuiderzee	Favour	
Haro Casper von Inn- und Kniphausen	Wester-Eems	Favour	
Roelof Hendrik van Isselmuden	Monden van de IJssel	Favour	
Jasper Gerrit van Ittersum	Monden van de IJssel	Favour	
Willem Jager	Zuiderzee	Favour	
Antony Janssen	Monden van de Rijn	Against	
Stephanus Bernardus Jantzon	Monden van de Rijn	Favour	
Johannes de Jong van Beek en Donk	Monden van de Rijn	Favour	
François Andries de Jonge	Monden van de Rijn	Favour	
Willem Adriaan de Jonge	Monden van de Schelde	Favour	
Marinus de Jonge	Monden van de Schelde	Favour	
Erdwin Adrianus de Jongh	Monden van de Maas	Favour	
Warmolt Wolthers Jullens	Wester-Eems	Favour	
Johan Hindrik Keiser	Wester-Eems	Favour	
Antoon Anne van Andringa de Kempenaer	Friesland	Favour	
Johan Melchior Kemper	Monden van de Maas	Favour	
Bernardus Kesselaer	Monden van de IJssel	Favour	
Johan Lambertus Kien	Zuiderzee	Favour	
Andries Jacob Kluppel	Zuiderzee	Favour	
Everard Kol	Zuiderzee	Favour	
Josephus Franciscus de Kuijper	Monden van de Rijn	Favour	
Wolter Kymmell	Wester-Eems	Favour	
Johannes van Laer	Zuiderzee	Favour	
Jacob Thymon Lakeman	Zuiderzee	Favour	
Gerardus Wilhelmus Josephus van Lamsweerde	Boven-IJssel	Favour	
M. Langeveld	Zuiderzee	Absent	
Frans Lemker	Monden van de IJssel	Favour	
Jacob Abraham van Lennep	Zuiderzee	Favour	
Carolus Justus Lewe van Aduard	Wester-Eems	Favour	
Edzard Jacob Lewe van Middelstum	Wester-Eems	Favour	
Edzard Willem Lewe van Nijenstein	Wester-Eems	Favour	
Andries Adriaen van der Ley	Zuiderzee	Favour	
Frédéric Auguste van Leyden	Monden van de Maas	Favour	
Cornelis Christiaan van Lidth de Jeude	Boven-IJssel	Favour	
Franciscus Josephus van Lilaar	Zuiderzee	Favour	
Samuel Johan van Limburg Stirum	Boven-IJssel	Favour	
Wigbold Albert Willem van der Does van Limburg Stirum	Monden van de Maas	Favour	
Barent van Lockhorst van Bonlez	Monden van de Maas	Favour	
Hendrik Jan van Loë	Boven-IJssel	Favour	
Maurits Adriaan de Savornin Lohman	Wester-Eems	Favour	
Jacobus Douw Loke	Monden van de Schelde	Favour	
Jan van Loon	Zuiderzee	Favour	
Tinco Martinus Lycklama à Nijeholt	Friesland	Favour	
Samuël van Lynden	Boven-IJssel	Favour	
Frans van Lynden	Boven-IJssel	Favour	
Jan Hendrik van Lynden	Zuiderzee	Favour	
Pieter Jacob van Maanen	Zuiderzee	Favour	
Barthold Johan Christiaan Mackay	Boven-IJssel	Favour	
Herman Egbert van Marle	Monden van de IJssel	Favour	
Hendrik Bernard Martini	Monden van de Rijn	Favour	
Martinus van Marum	Zuiderzee	Favour	
Job Seaburne May	Zuiderzee	Favour	
Pieter Melvill van Carnbee	Monden van de Maas	Favour	
Allard Merens	Zuiderzee	Favour	
Assuerus van der Merwede	Monden van de IJssel	Favour	
Nicolaas Methorst	Zuiderzee	Favour	
Jan Meulman	Zuiderzee	Favour	
Jean Gijsberto de Mey van Streefkerk	Monden van de Maas	Favour	
Jonas Daniël Meyer	Zuiderzee	Favour	
Reinerus Wilhelmus Josephus Antonius Franciscus van Middachten	Monden van de IJssel	Favour	
Isaac Nicolaas Johan van Mierop	Monden van de Maas	Favour	
Jacob Abraham Uitenhage de Mist	Monden van de Maas	Favour	
Willem Ferdinand Mogge Muilman	Monden van de Schelde	Favour	
Adrianus Franciscus Mulders	Monden van de Rijn	Against	
Andries Cornelis Willem Munter	Zuiderzee	Favour	
Anne Willem Carel van Nagell	Boven-IJssel	Favour	
Cornelis Jan Wouter Nahuys	Monden van de Rijn	Favour	
Cornelis Jan van Nellesteyn	Zuiderzee	Favour	
Laurens Johannes Nepveu	Zuiderzee	Favour	
David Mattheus van Gelder de Neufville	Zuiderzee	Favour	
Frederik Willem van Neukirchen genaamd Nyvenheim	Boven-IJssel	Favour	
Lucas Hendrik Coenraad Nilant	Monden van de IJssel	Favour	
Dominicus Noël	Monden van de Schelde	Favour	
Gerrit Nutges	Zuiderzee	Favour	
Jan Nysingh	Wester-Eems	Favour	
Gerrit Ockerse	Boven-IJssel	Favour	
Nicolaas Jan Okhuysen	Monden van de Maas	Favour	
Willem Olivier	Friesland	Favour	
Hendrik Onderwater	Monden van de Maas	Favour	
Boudewijn Onderwater	Monden van de Maas	Favour	
Henricus Oomen	Monden van de Rijn	Against	
Gregorius van Oordt	Monden van de Maas	Favour	
Jan Haak Oosting	Wester-Eems	Favour	
Hendrik Jan Op ten Noort	Boven-IJssel	Favour	
Joost Jan Op ten Noort	Monden van de IJssel	Favour	
Adrianus Johannes Osy	Monden van de Maas	Favour	
Cornelis van der Oudermeulen	Zuiderzee	Favour	
Johan Mouritz van Pabst	Boven-IJssel	Favour	
Frederik Wilhelm Floris Theodorus van Pallandt	Boven-IJssel	Favour	
Adolph Warner van Palland	Monden van de IJssel	Favour	
Jean Antoine Chrétien van Panhuys	Monden van de Rijn	Favour	
Gerrit Willem Panneboeter	Monden van de Rijn	Favour	
Daniël Jan Steyn Parvé	Monden van de Maas	Favour	
Barend Peelen	Zuiderzee	Favour	
Martin Copius Peereboom	Zuiderzee	Favour	
Arend Jacob Diederik de Perponcher Sedlnitsky	Zuiderzee	Favour	
Willem Nicolaas Pesters	Zuiderzee	Favour	
Anthoni Willem Philipse	Monden van de Schelde	Favour	
Daniel Pietermaat	Monden van de Maas	Favour	
Tobias Gutberleth Plegher	Boven-IJssel	Favour	
Willem Johan Plevier	Monden van de Schelde	Favour	
David van Poeliën	Monden van de Maas	Favour	
Jan van de Poll	Zuiderzee	Favour	
Jacobus Pompe	Monden van de Maas	Favour	
Abraham Pompe van Meerdervoort	Monden van de Maas	Favour	
Pieter Pont	Zuiderzee	Favour	
Imilius Frederik van Poppenhuizen	Friesland	Favour	
Daniël Pruimers	Boven-IJssel	Favour	
Willem Putman	Zuiderzee	Against	
Pierre Nicolas Quarles van Ufford	Zuiderzee	Favour	
Willem Queysen	Monden van de IJssel	Favour	
Jacob van Gesseler de Raadt	Wester-Eems	Favour	
Anthony Raedt	Boven-IJssel	Favour	
Otto van Randwijck	Boven-IJssel	Favour	
Bernhard van Rappard	Boven-IJssel	Favour	
Hendrik Anthon van Rappard	Boven-IJssel	Favour	
Pieter Adriaan Rauws	Monden van de Maas	Favour	
Frederik Rudolph Carel van Rechteren	Monden van de IJssel	Favour	
Frederik Lodewijk Christiaan van Rechteren Limpurg	Monden van de IJssel	Favour	
Willem Gustaaf Frederik van Reede	Zuiderzee	Favour	
Jacob Reepmaker	Monden van de Maas	Favour	
Mattheus Gilles Rees	Monden van de Maas	Favour	
Andreas Reigersman	Monden van de Rijn	Favour	
Willem Rendorp	Zuiderzee	Favour	
Johan Hendrik Petrus Eleonardt van Renesse	Zuiderzee	Favour	
Justinus Sjuck Gerrold Juckema van Burmania Rengers	Friesland	Favour	
Lamoraal Joachim Johan Juckema van Burmania Rengers	Friesland	Favour	
Johan Repelaer	Monden van de Maas	Favour	
Wilt Gerrit Jan van Rhemen	Boven-IJssel	Favour	
Johan Albert Rietvelt	Monden van de Rijn	Favour	
Thomas Cornelis van Rijckevorsel	Monden van de Rijn	Against	
Henri Joseph Robinet de Villeval	Monden van de Rijn	Favour	
François de Roo	Monden van de Maas	Favour	
Jan Hendrik Rombout Damisse de Roos	Monden van de Rijn	Favour	
Rijck Petrus de Ruuk	Boven-IJssel	Favour	
Mozes Salvador	Monden van de Maas	Favour	
Gerardus Willibrordus ten Sande	Zuiderzee	Favour	
Jacob Saportas	Zuiderzee	Favour	
Jan Stefanus Schaep	Monden van de Maas	Favour	
Everhardus Epeus Wielinga van Scheltinga	Friesland	Favour	
Menno Coehoorn van Scheltinga	Friesland	Favour	
Frans Julius Johan van Scheltinga	Friesland	Favour	
Hendricus Franciscus Josephus van Schenk van Nijdeggen	Boven-IJssel	Favour	
Johannes Antonius Schiefbaan	Monden van de Maas	Favour	
François Pierre Guillaume van Schuylenburch	Monden van de Maas	Favour	
Johan Sicco Tjalling Camstra thoe Schwartzenberg en Hohenlansberg	Friesland	Favour	
Maurits Johan van Löben Sels	Boven-IJssel	Favour	
Onno Adolf Marc Willem de Senarclens de Grancy	Monden van de Rijn	Favour	
Abraham Johannes Severijn	Zuiderzee	Favour	
Willem Hora Siccama	Wester-Eems	Favour	
Mello Sichterman	Wester-Eems	Favour	
Johan Matthias Singendonck	Boven-IJssel	Favour	
Willem de Sitter	Wester-Eems	Favour	
Jan Six	Monden van de Maas	Favour	
Cornelis Charles Six	Zuiderzee	Favour	
Johan Diederik Barthout van Slingelandt	Monden van de Maas	Favour	
Floris Willem Sloet	Monden van de IJssel	Favour	
Anthony Sloet tot Oldruitenborgh	Monden van de IJssel	Favour	
Reint Wolter Sloet van Marxveld	Monden van de IJssel	Favour	
Jacob Frederick van Sloterdijck	Friesland	Favour	
Theodorus de Smeth	Monden van de Rijn	Favour	
Willem Livius van Sminia	Friesland	Favour	
Samuel Snoeck	Zuiderzee	Favour	
Godert Theodoor Adriaan Snouckaert van Schauburg	Zuiderzee	Favour	
Petrus Sonnaville	Zuiderzee	Favour	
Bernardus Josephus van Sonsbeeck	Monden van de IJssel	Against	
Frederik Adolf van Spaen	Boven-IJssel	Favour	
Johan Frederik Willem van Spaen	Boven-IJssel	Favour	
Willem Anne van Spaen la Lecq	Monden van de Rijn	Favour	
Jacob Spiegelmaker Spanjaard	Zuiderzee	Favour	
Arent van der Spelt	Monden van de Rijn	Favour	
Johannes Eduardus Hendricus Theodorus Speyart van Woerden	Boven-IJssel	Favour	
Laurens Jan van de Spiegel	Monden van de Schelde	Favour	
Daniël Pompejus Johannes van der Staal	Monden van de Maas	Favour	
Engel van de Stadt	Zuiderzee	Favour	
Antonie Christiaan Wynand Staring	Boven-IJssel	Favour	
Nicolaas Steengracht	Monden van de Schelde	Favour	
Jacob Diederik van der Steen	Boven-IJssel	Favour	
Bartholomeus Michael van Steenhardt	Zuiderzee	Favour	
Pieter Stelt	Zuiderzee	Favour	
Dirk Stoop	Monden van de Maas	Favour	
Paulus Straalman	Boven-IJssel	Favour	
Anne Willem Straalman	Zuiderzee	Favour	
Jan Mossel van Stralen	Monden van de Maas	Favour	
Nicolaas Hendrik Strick van Linschoten	Zuiderzee	Favour	
Richard Sturenberg	Monden van de Maas	Favour	
Willem Suermondt	Monden van de Maas	Favour	
Hendrik Constans Swellengrebel	Zuiderzee	Favour	
Jean Henri van Swinden	Zuiderzee	Against	
Reneke de Marees van Swinderen	Wester-Eems	Favour	
Wicher van Swinderen	Wester-Eems	Against	
Wigbold van Sypesteyn	Zuiderzee	Favour	
Willem Hendrik van Sytzama	Friesland	Favour	
Jan Anthony Taets van Amerongen	Zuiderzee	Favour	
Jacob Teengs	Zuiderzee	Favour	
Isaac Jacobus Tegelberg	Monden van de Schelde	Favour	
Johan Andries Tengbergen	Boven-IJssel	Favour	
Matthias Johan Frederik van Tets	Monden van de Rijn	Favour	
Diederik Gregorius van Teylingen van Kamerik	Monden van de Maas	Favour	
Gerhard Jacob Thomassen à Thuessink	Monden van de IJssel	Favour	
W.B. de Tip	Zuiderzee	Absent	
Herman Anthony Tobias	Monden van de IJssel	Favour	
Herman Tollius	Monden van de Rijn	Favour	
Joachimus Lunsingh Tonckens	Wester-Eems	Favour	
Martinus van Toulon	Monden van de Maas	Favour	
J. du Tour	Zuiderzee	Absent	
Adriaan Joseph Trip	Wester-Eems	Favour	
Jean Louis Trip	Monden van de Rijn	Favour	
Willem René van Tuyll van Serooskerken	Zuiderzee	Favour	
Willem Lodewijk van der Upwich	Monden van de IJssel	Favour	
M.L. van Utenhoven van Bottenstein	Zuiderzee	Absent	
Cornelis Constantijn van Valkenburg	Zuiderzee	Favour	
Dominicus Nicolaas van der Veen	Wester-Eems	Against	
Valerius Lodewijk Vegilin van Claerbergen	Friesland	Favour	
Andreas Arnoldus van Velthoven	Monden van de Rijn	Favour	
Antonius Josephus Johannes Henricus Verheijen	Monden van de Rijn	Against	
Franciscus Xaverius Verheyen	Monden van de Rijn	Against	
Jan Steven Verspijck	Monden van de Rijn	Favour	
François van Bredehoff de Vicq	Zuiderzee	Favour	
Willem Livius van Vierssen	Friesland	Favour	
Martinus van Vierssen	Friesland	Favour	
Otto de Virieu	Boven-IJssel	Favour	
Paul Engelbert Voet van Winssen	Zuiderzee	Favour	
Antoni Jan van Vollenhoven	Zuiderzee	Favour	
Cornelis van Vollenhoven	Monden van de Maas	Favour	
Antonius Josephus Joannes Caspar de Voocht	Monden van de Rijn	Favour	
Gijsbert Johan van Voorst	Monden van de Maas	Favour	
Gerrit Vos	Wester-Eems	Favour	
Reint Hendrik de Vos van Steenwijk	Monden van de IJssel	Favour	
Godert Willem de Vos van Steenwijk	Wester-Eems	Favour	
Jan Christoffel van Voss	Monden van de Rijn	Favour	
Johan Cornelis François de Vries	Boven-IJssel	Favour	
Jan Waardenburgh	Zuiderzee	Favour	
Gerardus Everhardus Vos de Wael	Monden van de IJssel	Favour	
Jacob Waiboer	Zuiderzee	Favour	
Nicolaas Warin	Zuiderzee	Favour	
Klaas Arjens Wassenaar	Friesland	Favour	
Jacob Nanning Arend van Wassenaer	Boven-IJssel	Favour	
Everard van Weede	Zuiderzee	Favour	
Kaspar Karl Ferdinand Anton Franz de Weichs de Wenne	Monden van de Rijn	Favour	
Petrus Johannes Wendorp	Zuiderzee	Favour	
Leonardus de Wendt	Friesland	Favour	
Evert Johan Wentholt	Boven-IJssel	Favour	
Adriaan van der Werff	Monden van de Maas	Favour	
Willem Jan Westenberg	Boven-IJssel	Favour	
Borchard Frederik Willem van Westerholt	Boven-IJssel	Favour	
Jan Jacob van Westrenen van Sterkenburg	Zuiderzee	Favour	
Hendrik Weveringh	Zuiderzee	Favour	
Hendrik Lodewijk Wijchgel	Wester-Eems	Favour	
Isaäc Willer	Monden van de Maas	Favour	
Jan Albert Willinge	Friesland	Favour	
Wilhem Willink	Zuiderzee	Favour	
Josua Jacob van Winter	Zuiderzee	Favour	
H. van Wyckersloot van Gruevenmachern	Zuiderzee	Absent	
Frederik de With	Friesland	Favour	
Nicolaas Cornelis Wittert	Monden van de Maas	Favour	
Joan Derk François van der Wyck	Monden van de IJssel	Favour	
Adriaan van Zeebergh	Zuiderzee	Absent	
Johannes Josephus Franciscus van Zurpele	Monden van de Rijn	Against	
Jasper Hendrik van Zuylen van Nievelt	Boven-IJssel	Favour	
Arnout van Zuylen van Nijevelt	Monden van de Maas	Favour	
