= Hieronymus Bosch (disambiguation) =

Hieronymus Bosch (c. 1450–1516) was a Dutch draughtsman and painter.

Hieronymus Bosch may also refer to:

- Hieronymus de Bosch (1740–1811), Dutch poet
- Harry Bosch, a fictional detective in Michael Connelly's novels

== See also ==
- Hieronymus Bock (1498–1554), German botanist, physician, and Lutheran minister
