= John Cuthbertson (instrument maker) =

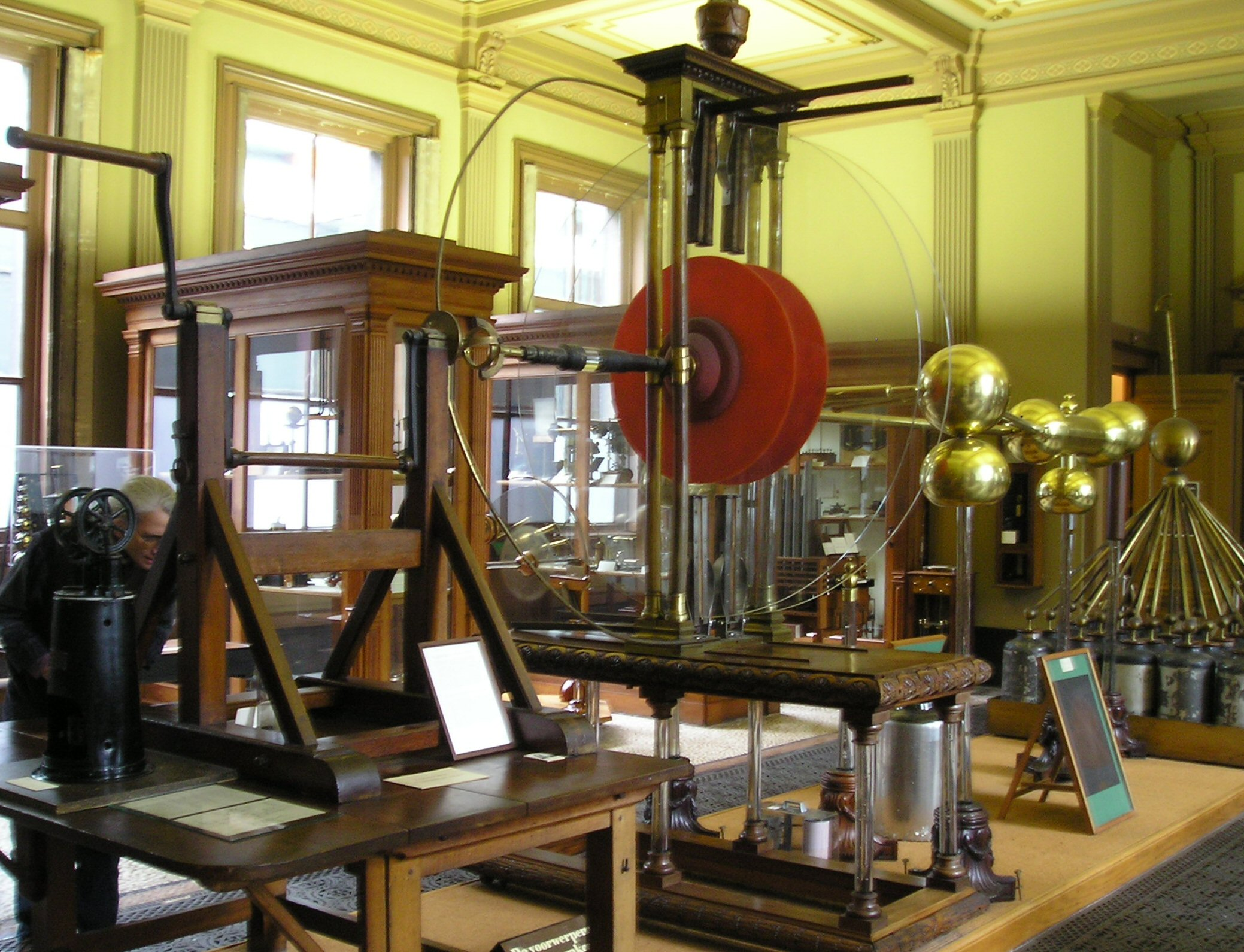
The "large electrostatic generator" which was made by Cuthbertson for Teylers Museum(Haarlem)

John Cuthbertson (bapt. 1 July 1743 in Dearham – 1821) was an English instrument maker and inventor that lived from 1768 until roughly 1796 in Amsterdam.

== Biography ==
John was the second son of the inn keeper and yeoman Jonathan Cuthbertson and his second wife, Mary Fisher. John had three siblings, of which two survived (a younger brother Jonathan (1744–1806) and one other): the third died at a young age (Jonathan, the eldest). John and the younger brother Jonathan are often confused in literature and publications. While John worked for a long time in Amsterdam, Jonathan worked in Rotterdam, both in the same line of work.

John studied with the prominent London instrument maker James Champneys and when Champney moved to Amsterdam in December 1768, Cuthbertson joined him. On 1 September 1768 John had married Champney's daughter Jane. They had four children, three sons and a daughter, but only the daughter, Jane Cuthbertson, survived.

In 1782, Cuthbertson published a book in Dutch called Algemeene Eigenschappen van Electriciteit, onderrichting van de Werktuigen en het nemen van proeven in dezelve (free translation: "General characteristics of electricity, education on the tools and the performing of tests in those") and also organized public lectures, both to disseminate the knowledge about electricity, in his opinion very poor in the Netherlands. The book was quite popular in the Netherlands, and lead him to publish another two volumes with even more possible experiments. In all his publications Cuthbertson seems to concentrate on the glass plate generators and not on the cylindrical ones, possibly because he was involved in the production of the glass plate generators.

In 1783–1784 he used the suggestions of Martinus van Marum, who also had a history of designing electrostatic generators and who had already been in touch with Cuthbertson, in 1774 and 1781, to build the (at that time) largest glass plate electrostatic generator in existence for the Teylers Tweede Genootschap of the Teylers Stichting. It had disks with a diameter of 1.65 m (5 ft 5 in) and was connected to a battery of Leyden jars to store the charge produced. With this machine a 61 cm (2 ft) spark could be produced of, which comes down to roughly 330.000 Volt. Van Marum believed that with larger machines, currents and charges more scientific progress could be made. The machine was based on a smaller model produced by Jonathan Cuthbertson shortly before, but with some significant changes, such as glass poles instead of wooden ones. Based on empirical studies Cuthbertson made changes to the scaled-up model. Finally the machine was installed in December 1784 and he received the sum of 3000 guilders for it.

Sometime between 1793 and 1796 he returned to England, living in Poland Street in London (contrary to his brother Jonathan who remained in Rotterdam), probably due to the political unrest in the Dutch Republic. Here he continued his business and produced a number of smaller (simplified) electrostatic generators – a design that would be produced until the 1920s. He also worked on electrometers, for which he invented a new design, air pumps and wrote scientific papers.

In 1807 Cuthbertson published Practical Electricity and Galvanism. This book was partly intended to encourage the sale of scientific instruments for home or school experiments and partly to explain the medical uses of electricity. The home experiments are described as ‘easy and pleasing to the young practitioner’.The use of static electrical charges and low intensity electrical currents on the human body, known as galvanism, was often used both to treat mental illness and to revive people after drowning or lightning strikes. Almost all conditions, including gout, fever, hydrocephalus, blindness, deafness and genitor-urinary infections were supposed to be treatable by the application of electricity.

For Rees's Cyclopædia he contributed articles about electricity, but the topics are not known. He died in 1821 and was buried in St James's Church, Piccadilly.
