= Pieter Nieuwland College =

Coordinates: 52.3496°N 4.9237°E

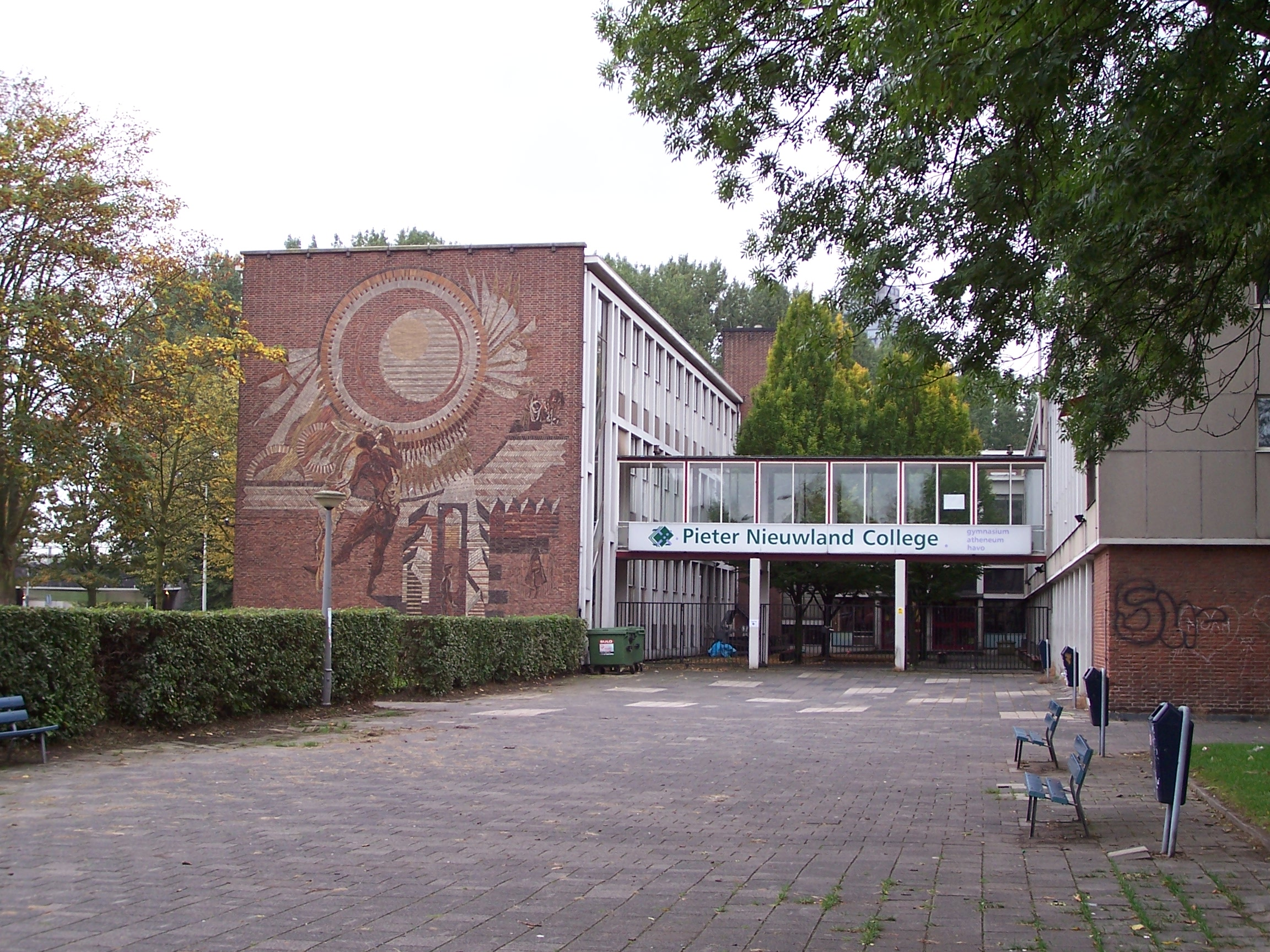
- External view of the college.

Location
- Nobelweg 6 Amsterdam, Netherlands; Netherlands

Information
- Type: Public High School
- Established: 1960
- School district: Watergraafsmeer
- Principal: Koen Bakker
- Faculty: 100
- Enrolment: 930 students
- Website: www.pieternieuwland.nl

The Pieter Nieuwland College is a secondary school in Amsterdam, the Netherlands, in the district Watergraafsmeer. The school is named after Pieter Nieuwland. It is a school of further education with the directions VWO and HAVO. The school is a part of the ZAAM Group.

From this school a new Gymnasium was started, the Cygnus Gymnasium. The Gymnasium is the same level of education as Atheneum but with an additional focus on ancient languages such as Greek and Latin.
