= Heinrich Geißler =

German physicist and glassblower (1814–1879)

Heinrich Geissler
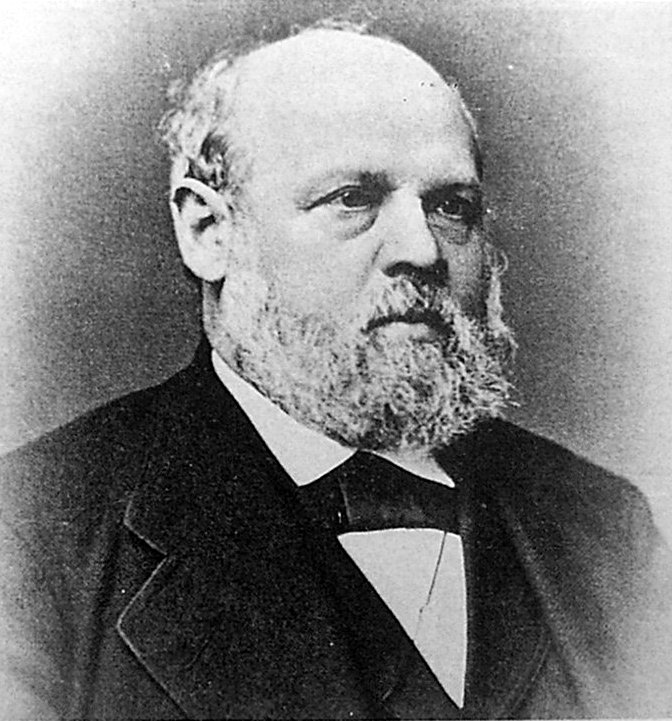
- Heinrich Geissler
- Born: 26 May 1814; Igelshieb, Thuringia, Saxe-Meiningen
- Died: 24 January 1879 (aged 64)
- Known for: Geissler tubes
- Scientific career
- Fields: Physics

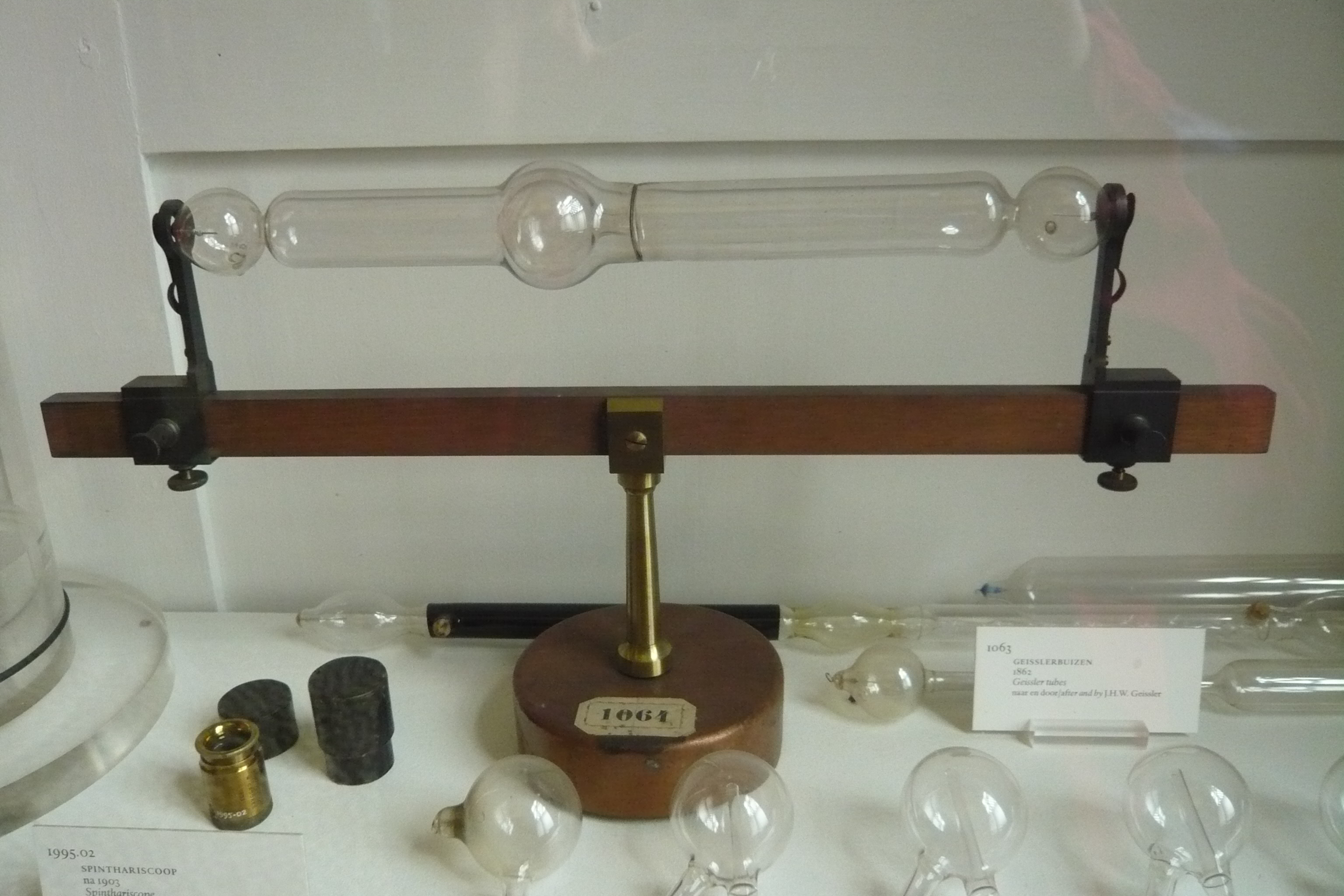
1862 Geißler discharge tube with holder in the Teylers Instrument Room. In 1856, his brother Wilhelm Geissler had worked together with Van der Willigen, the future (1864) conservator of the Physical Cabinet of Teylers Museum. After that, Heinrich Geissler made his well-known glass discharge tubes in Bonn.

Johann Heinrich Wilhelm Geißler (26 May 1814 in Igelshieb – 24 January 1879) was a skilled glassblower and physicist, famous for his invention of the hand pumped Geissler mercury vacuum pump in the mid-1850's and in 1857, the Geissler tube, made of glass and used as a low pressure gas-discharge tube; these two inventions were critical technologies leading to the discovery of the electron.

Geissler descended from a long line of craftsmen in the Thüringer Wald and in Bohemia. He found work in different German universities, eventually including the University of Bonn. There he was asked by physicist Julius Plücker to design an apparatus for evacuating a glass tube.

Plücker owed his forthcoming success in the electric discharge experiments in large measure to his instrument maker, the skilled glassblower and mechanic Johann Heinrich Wilhelm Geissler. He learned the art of glassblowing in the duchy of Saxe-Meiningen.... He finally settled down as an instrument-maker in a workshop of his own at the University of Bonn in 1852.

The Geissler tube was used for entertainment throughout the 1800s and evolved around 1910 into commercial neon lighting. Advances in Plucker and Geissler's discharge tube technology developed into the Crookes tube, with which the electron was discovered in 1897, and in 1906 into the amplifying vacuum tube, the basis of electronics and long-distance communication technologies like radio and television.

Geissler was awarded an honorary doctorate in 1868.

== References and articles ==
Publications

- Miller, H. A. (1945). Luminous tube lighting, dealing with the principles of the luminous tube, with a summary of the materials and equipment involved, and technical data concerning discharge-tube light sources. London: G. Newnes.
- Kassabian, Mihran Krikor Roentgen rays and electro-therapeutics: with chapters on radium and phototherapy. Publisher: J.B. Lippincott Company Philadelphia & London, 1910 - Lippincott's New Medical Series. Edited by Francis R. Packard, M.D
- Davis, H. B. O. (1981). Electrical and electronic technologies: a chronology of events and inventors to 1900. Metuchen, N.J.: Scarecrow Press.
- Phillips, C. E. S. (Charles Edmund Stanley): Bibliography of X-ray literature and research, 1896–1897: being a ready reference index to the literature on the subject of roentgen or X-rays. Publisher: The Electrician Print. and Pub. Co., London 1897
  - Heinrich Geissler 1838, page 16, Historical Retrospect in: Charles E. S. Philips
