= Stadsbibliotheek Haarlem =

Public libraries in Haarlem, Netherlands

Coordinates: 52.3805°N 4.6308°E

Haarlem Public Library
- Stadsbibliotheek Haarlem
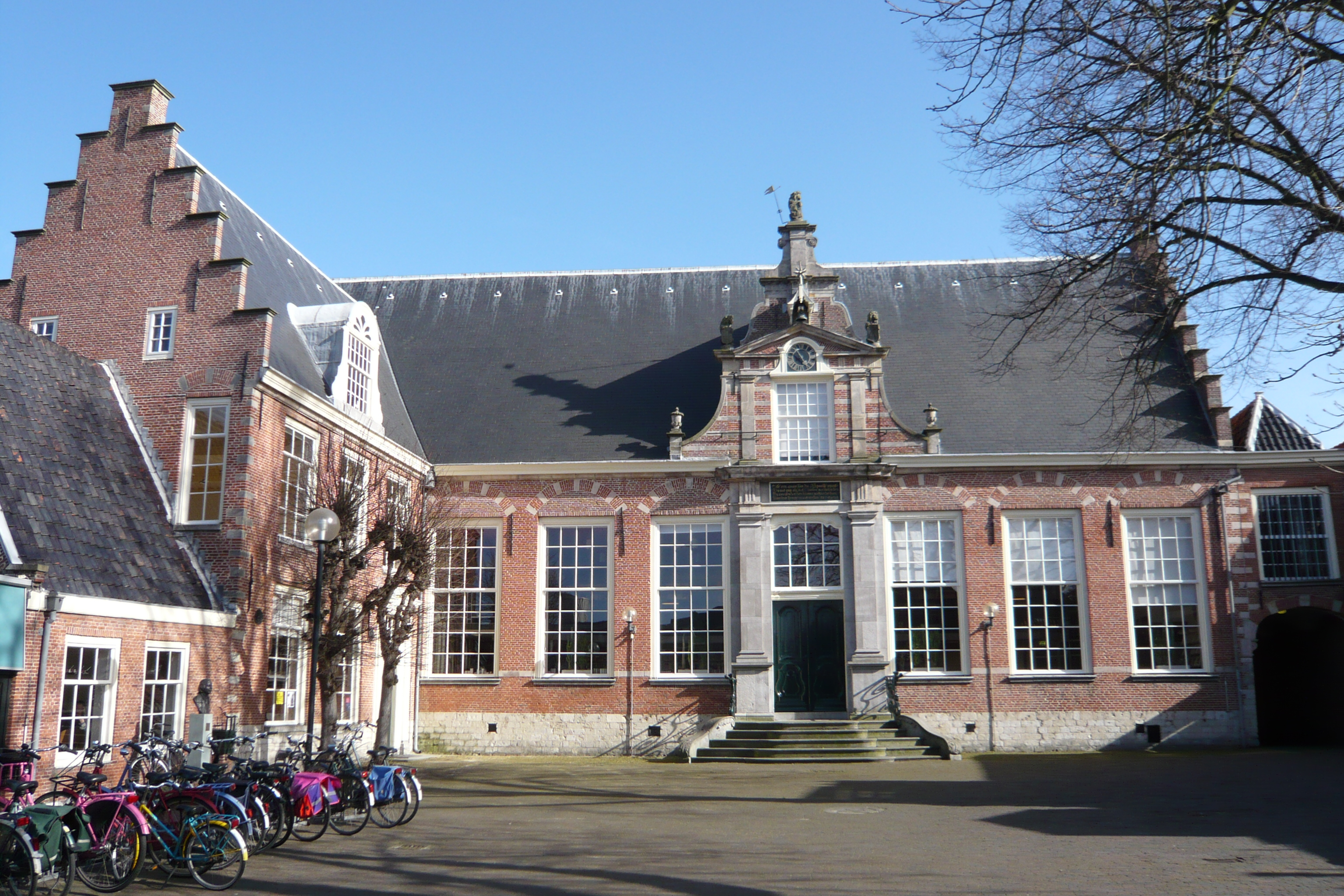
- The Haarlem central library
- Location: Gasthuisstraat, Haarlem, Netherlands
- Type: Public library
- Established: 1921
- Branches: 6

Collection
- Items collected: Cd's, books, rare books & music, and Internet access.

Access and use
- Access requirements: Open to the public
- Population served: 180,000 (2008)

Other information
- Director: J.E. van der Putten
- Employees: 3
- Website: sitegenerator.bibliotheek.nl/haarlem/home

The Stadsbibliotheek Haarlem (Haarlem Public Library) is a collective name for all public libraries in the Haarlem area of the Netherlands. The first public library of Haarlem opened in 1921 at the cloisters of the Haarlem City Hall where the academic library had been since 1821. The move to open its doors to the public with a public reading room was only possible after the previous occupant of the downstairs cloisters, the Frans Hals Museum, moved out in 1913 to its present location. As of 2009, there are 6 public libraries and 10 lending points, such as in hospitals.

== Historical Collection ==
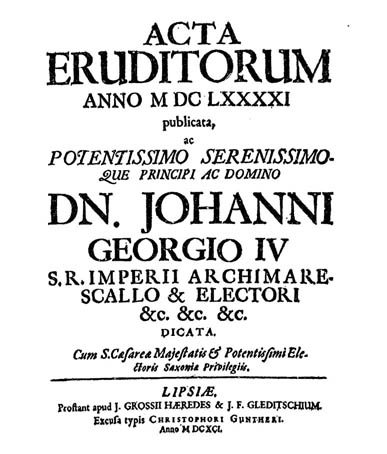
Acta Eruditorum

In 1596 the Haarlem City council decided to start a library, or librije as it was then called. This was a collection of books attached by chain to a lessenaar, an elongated lectern that held the books below on a shelf. The chain was long enough so that the reader could select a book from below to read while standing. This collection was kept in the Sint-Bavokerk, where it probably came from (all church property was seized by the city council after the iconoclasm riots of the Protestant Reformation). The books were only available to the few people in possession of a key to the church. Today this older collection of books (everything published before 1900) is kept by the stichting Oude Boekerij en Bijzondere Collecties (OBBC). This includes a complete series of the Acta Eruditorum, for example. The oldest items are religious by nature, coming from church holdings prior to 1596. The oldest item is a fragment of the Book of Psalms, or psalterium, from the 11th century. At what time the collection moved to the city hall itself is uncertain, but this probably happened after 1625, when the collection was expanded with the library of the Commanderij van St. Jan, when all of their property reverted to the state. The first printed catalog of the Haarlem library dates from 1672 and is 35 pages long. By that time the collection was managed by the teachers of the Latin school (today a High School called Stedelijk Gymnasium Haarlem, and still located next to City Hall). The access to the books was still far from public.

== Abraham de Vries ==
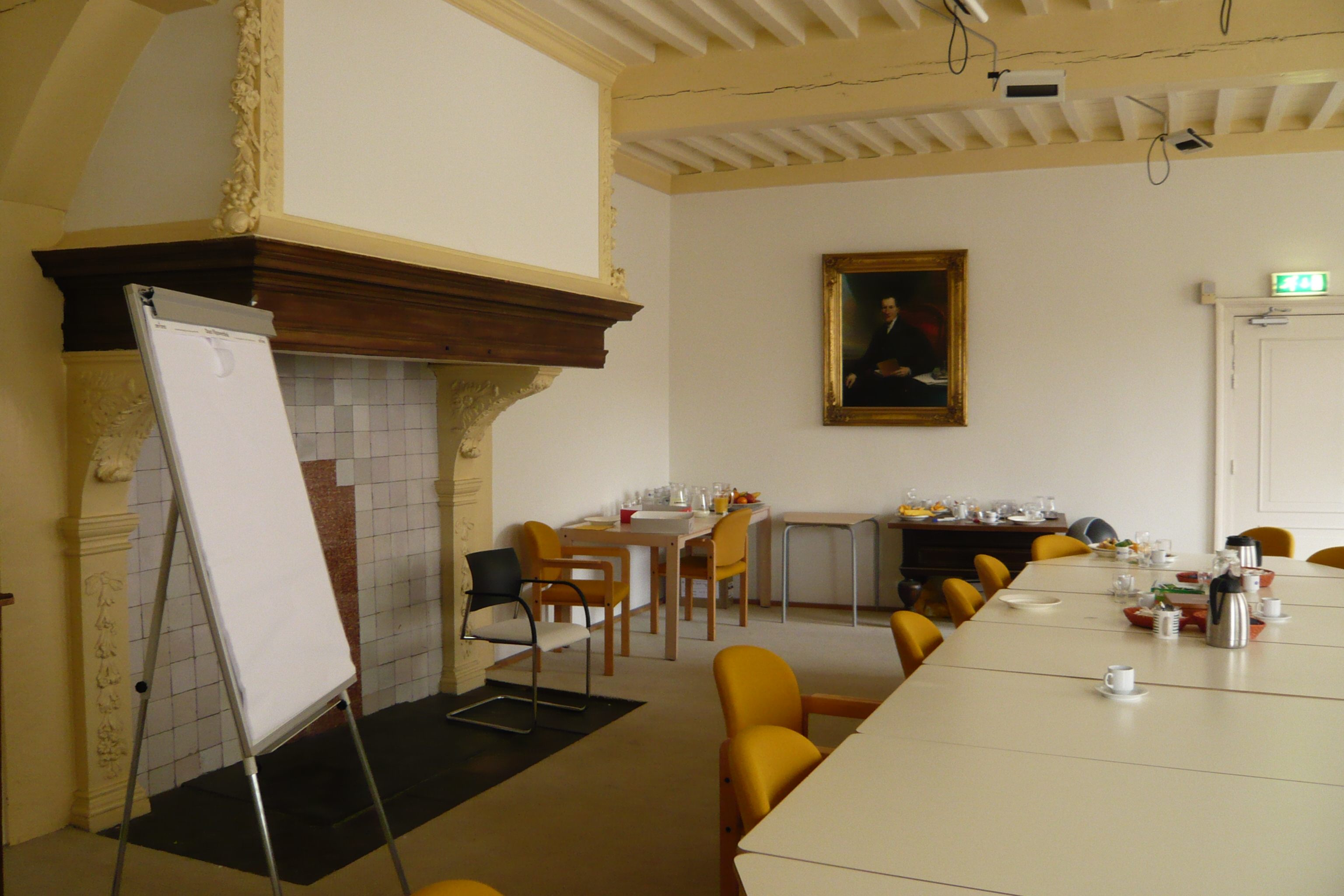
Krijgsraadkamer with fireplace and picture of Abraham de Vries.

In 1821 the city appointed the first Librarian, Abraham de Vries. He set about establishing an impressive collection of Haarlem historical books, and was especially fond of Costeriana; material relating to the history of Laurens Janszoon Coster as the father of the printing press. He also printed a three part catalog of the Library collection. A painting of him hangs in the Krijgsraadkamer, or war-room of the Central library. This room can be hired from the library for meetings or meals, and is also the spot where the historic scene of the Damiate legend hung for centuries above the fireplace.

== Central Library building "De Doelen" ==
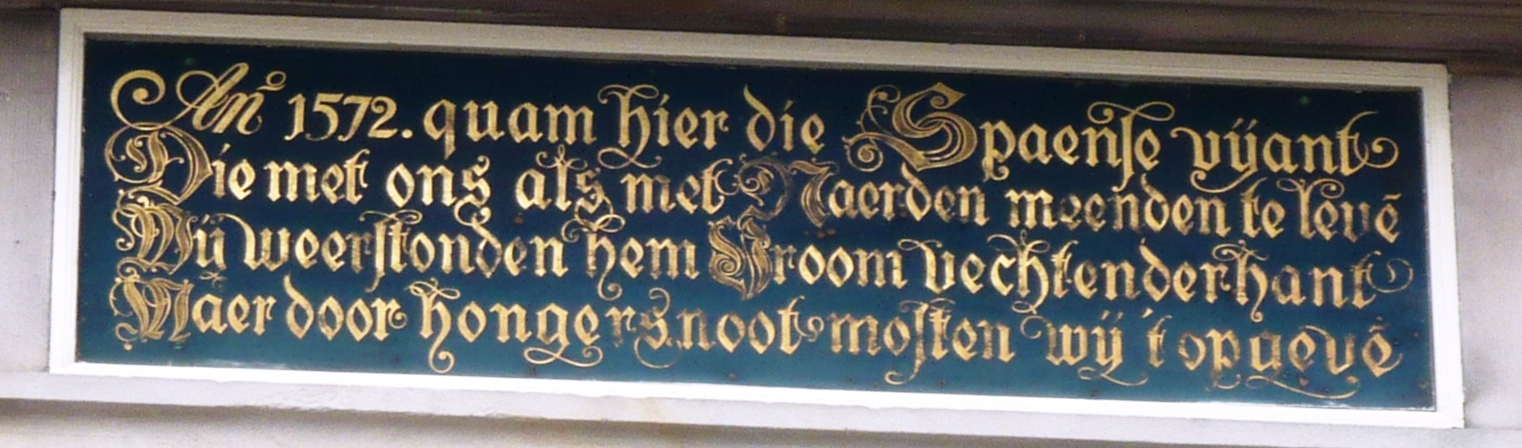
Text above the old doorway

The largest of the Haarlem lending libraries, the Centrale Bibliotheek, moved to the Doelenplein on the Gasthuisstraat in 1974. The history of this location is older than the collection itself. In 1512 the property was bought for target practise by the Haarlem schutterij. In 1562 the current L-shaped building was finished, and the Civic Guard was painted near the steps in the front by Hendrik Gerritsz Pot in 1630. Through the window in the painting the rafters can be seen that still grace the ceiling of the study room (see picture), and even a corner of a previous militia portrait. The heroic deeds of the Civic Guard during the siege of Haarlem are remembered also in the commemorative text above the old hall doorway added in 1772:

In 1572 quam hier de Spaense vyant
Die met ons als met Naerden meenden te leve
Wij weerstonden hem Vroom vechtenderhand
Maer door hongersnoot mosten wij 't opgeve

Translated into English as:

In 1572 the Spanish enemy came here
to treat us the same way as Naarden
We withstood him, fighting bravely
But from hunger we had to give up

== Kenauzaal ==
Across from this former entrance is the main entrance to an extension that opened in 1974. Between these doorways are the bicycle racks on one side and two older buildings on the other side. One was the workspace used for repairing weapons, and the other was an additional meeting room named Kenauzaal, after Kenau Simonsdochter Hasselaer, where a painting of her hung from the 17th century until the 19th century. This particular painting of her now hangs in the Haarlem city hall.

== Paintings formerly hanging in the library when it was a Civic Guard Meeting hall ==
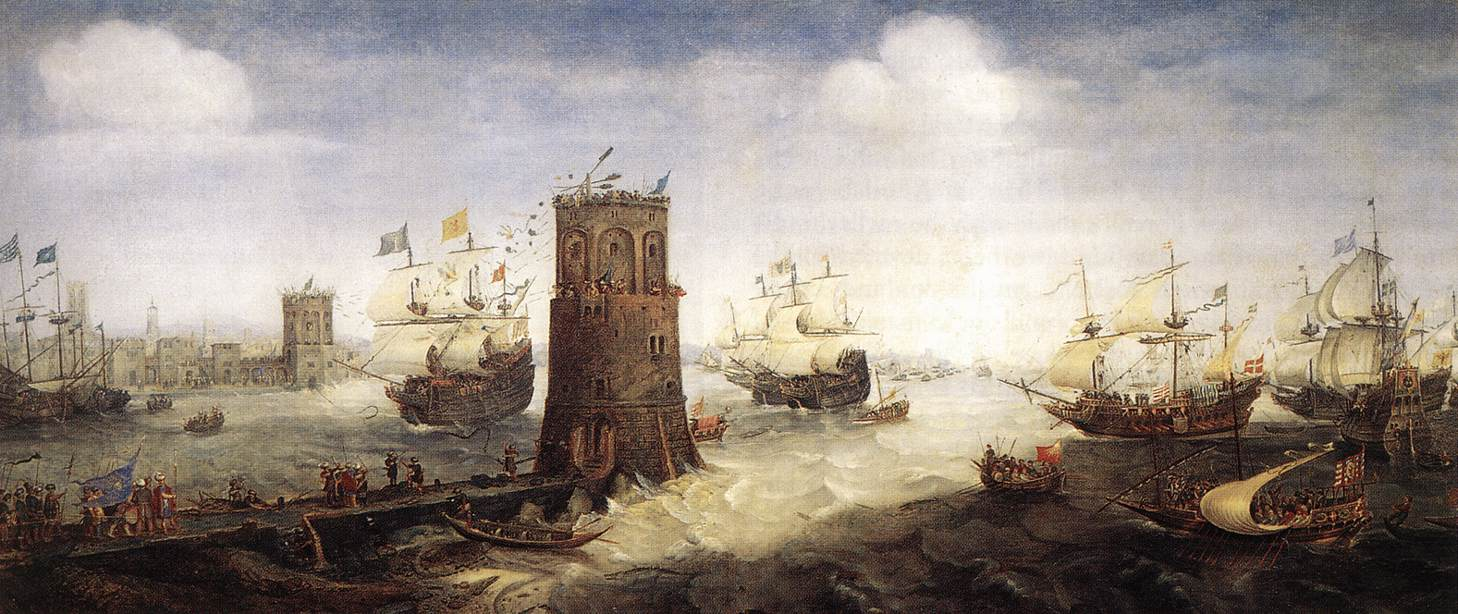
A Haarlem ship cuts the chain of the port of Damietta, by Haarlem painter Cornelis Claesz van Wieringen, which once hung in the "Krijgsraadkamer" above the fireplace.

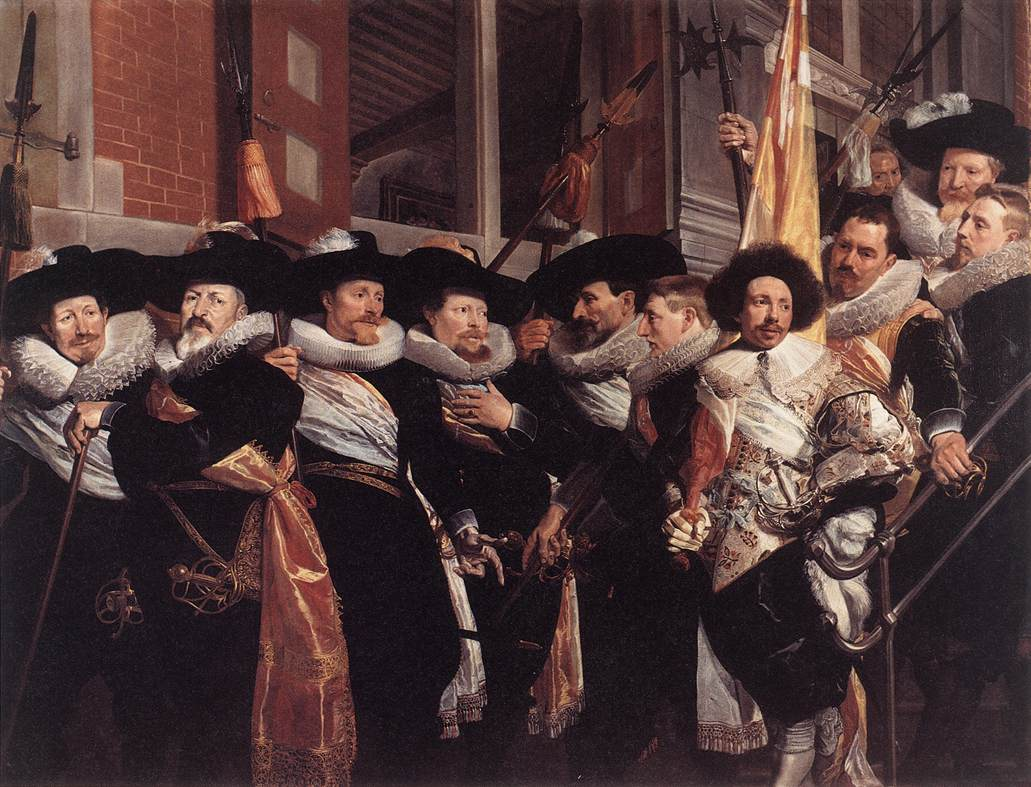
Haarlem's Civic Guard (the one bearing the flag of St. Adrian) portrait by Hendrik Gerritsz Pot in 1630 on what is now library steps. It once hung in the study hall.

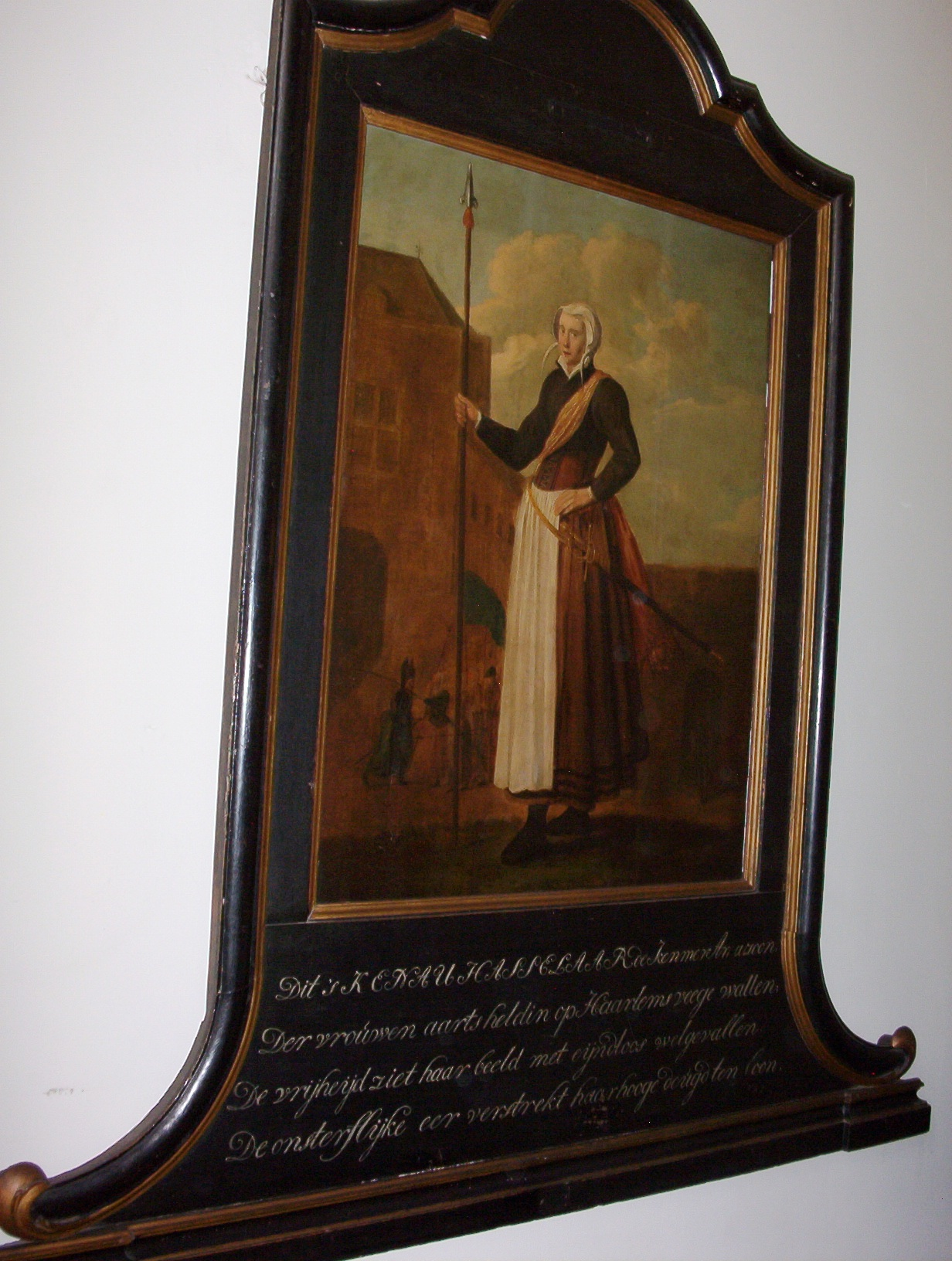
Kenau Hasselaar painting that once hung in the entrance

== See also ==
- List of libraries in the Netherlands
