= Large electrostatic generator (Teylers) =

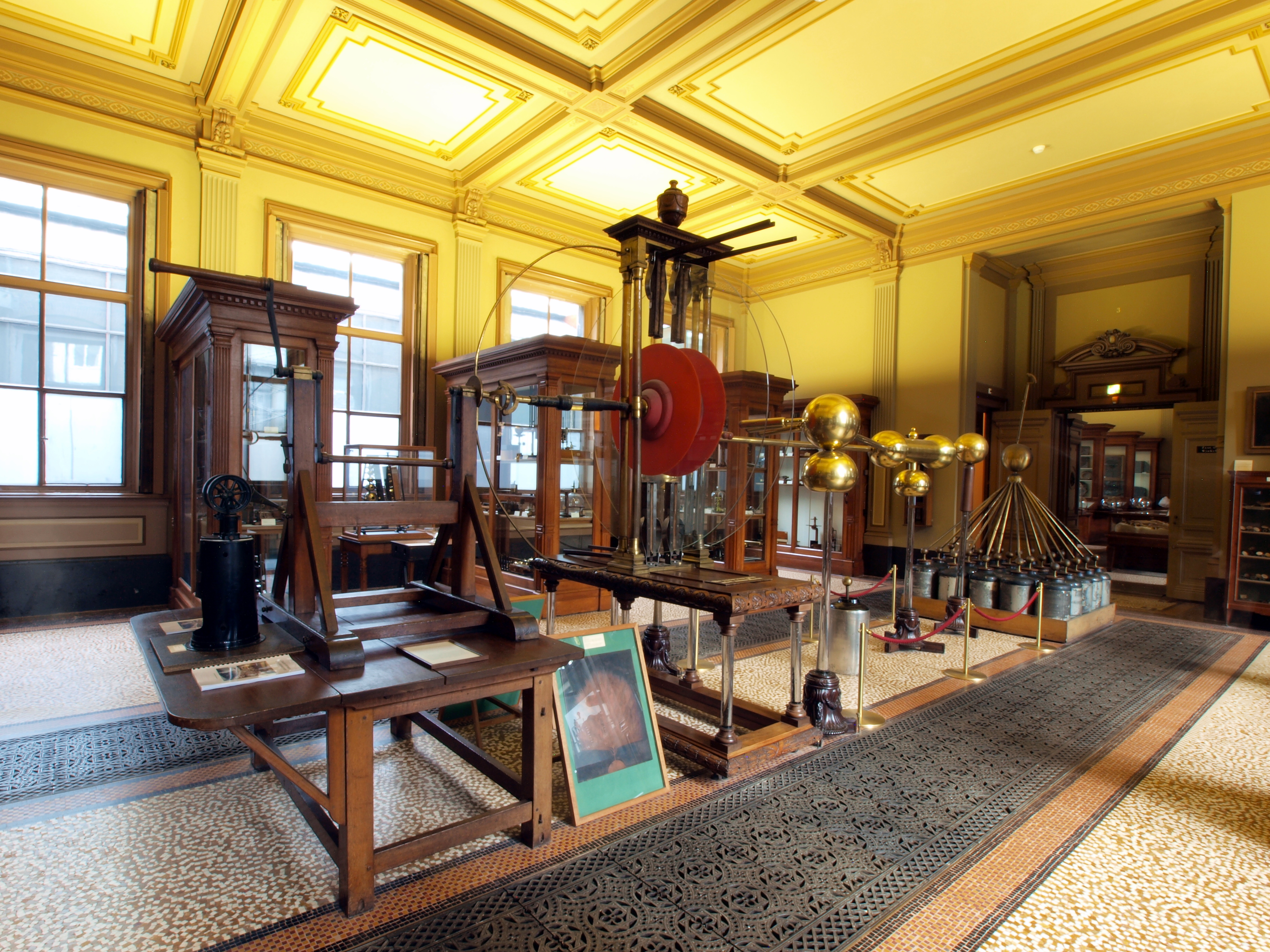
Van Marum's electrostatic generator in the Teylers Museum instrument room. The wooden table and supports were designed to match the Oval Room where it was initially kept until the mid 19th century.

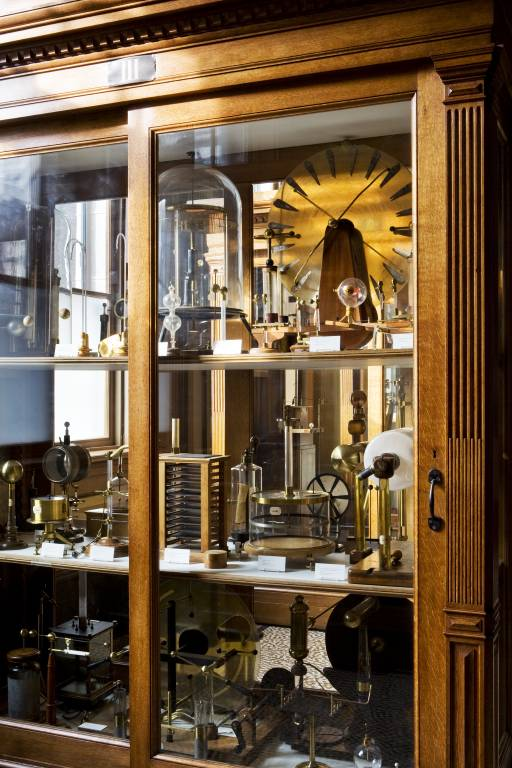
In the second cabinet in the same room are various portable electrostatic generators, each built according to a different design. On the bottom right in the back is the first model by Gerhard Kuyper that Van Marum had built in Groningen, with the mercury bath.

The large electrostatic generator (Dutch: Van Marum electriseermachine) is a large handcrafted electromechanical instrument designed by Martin van Marum and built by John Cuthbertson in 1784 for the Teylers Museum in Haarlem, where it forms the centerpiece of the instrument room. The concept of an electrostatic generator was new, and the battery (array) of leiden jars was the largest ever built (only one of the 4 sets of leiden jars is on display to conserve space). The two glass disks of the triboelectric generator (friction generator) are 1.65 meters in diameter, and the machine is capable of generating a potential of 330,000 volts.

== History ==
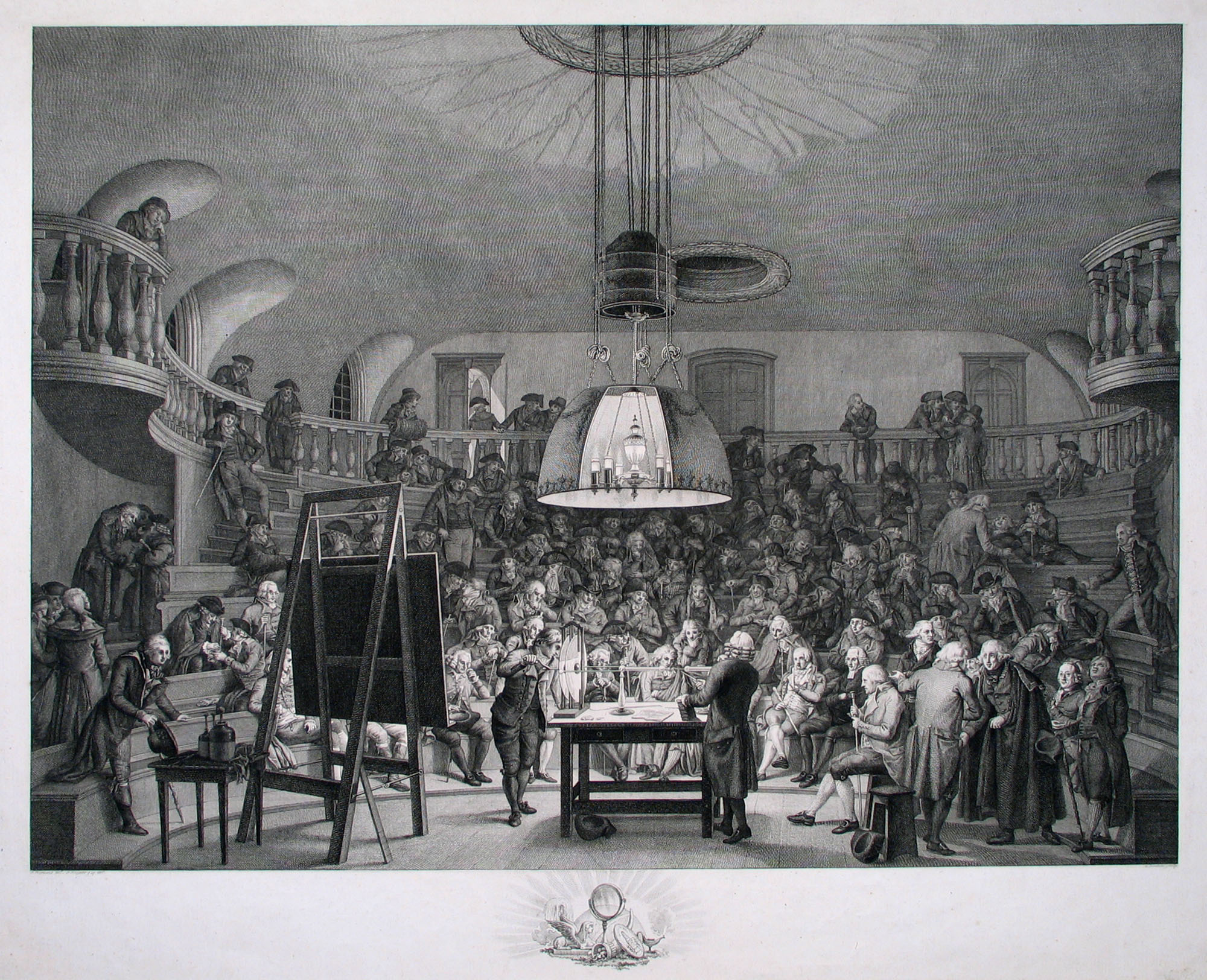
This 1794 demonstration of a smaller electrostatic generator in Felix Meritis shows the popularity of such devices, though Van Marum's machine was much larger. A copy of this engraving hangs in the Teylers Instrument room near the large electrostatic generator.

The device is a larger version of a similar model built in Groningen by Gerhard Kuyper in 1774 for physics student Martin van Marum, who used it to make a name for himself in the study of electricity with his lectures and demonstrations.

It was Van Marum's dream to create a larger version, and he applied to the Teylers Stichting in 1783 for funding to create such a large instrument in the hope that it would add a valuable contribution to the science of electricity. On April 11 of that year his request was granted, and on May 7 Cuthbertson was employed who finished the device a year later and it was proudly installed on Christmas Eve. The machine performed above expectations and was only modified a few times to prevent leaks of the static charge. The study of electricity leakage led to many insights in the study of electricity. The machine was last modified in 1791. For the friction, cushions were used as an improvement over the mercury bath used in the earlier model. For a complete description of the electrostatic generator, an explanation was produced in 1868 by the Parisian author Adolphe Ganot (1804–1887).

Van Marum himself became curator of the physics cabinet at Teylers in the same year the instrument was ordered to be made. He used it again and again in laboratory lectures to the public and continued to make excursions with his smaller model, which he finally sold to the museum for 120 guilders in 1790.
