= Abraham de Vries (minister) =

Dutch Mennonite minister and author

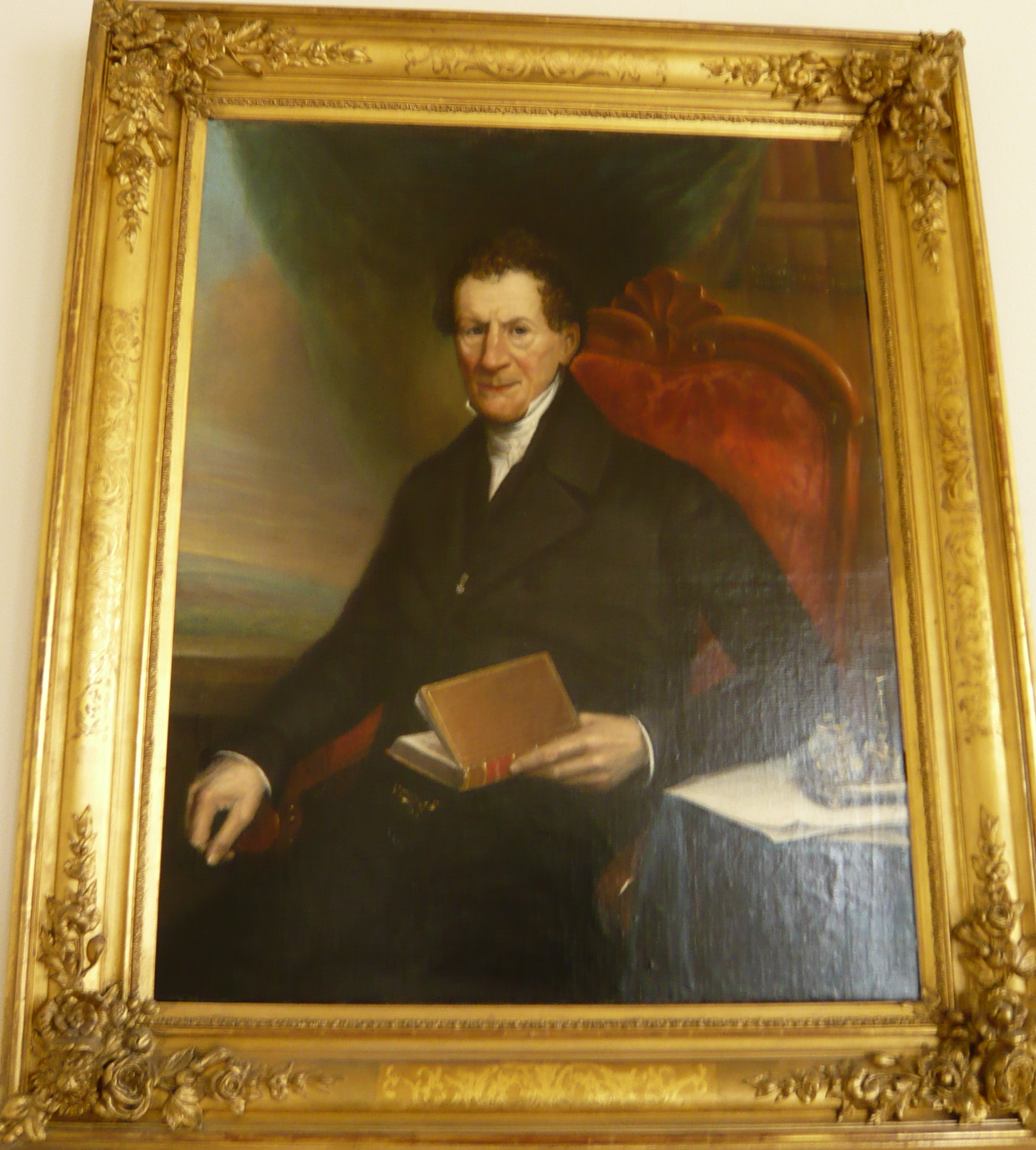
Portrait of Abraham de Vries in the Haarlem Public Library, ca. 1850 by Jan Kieft

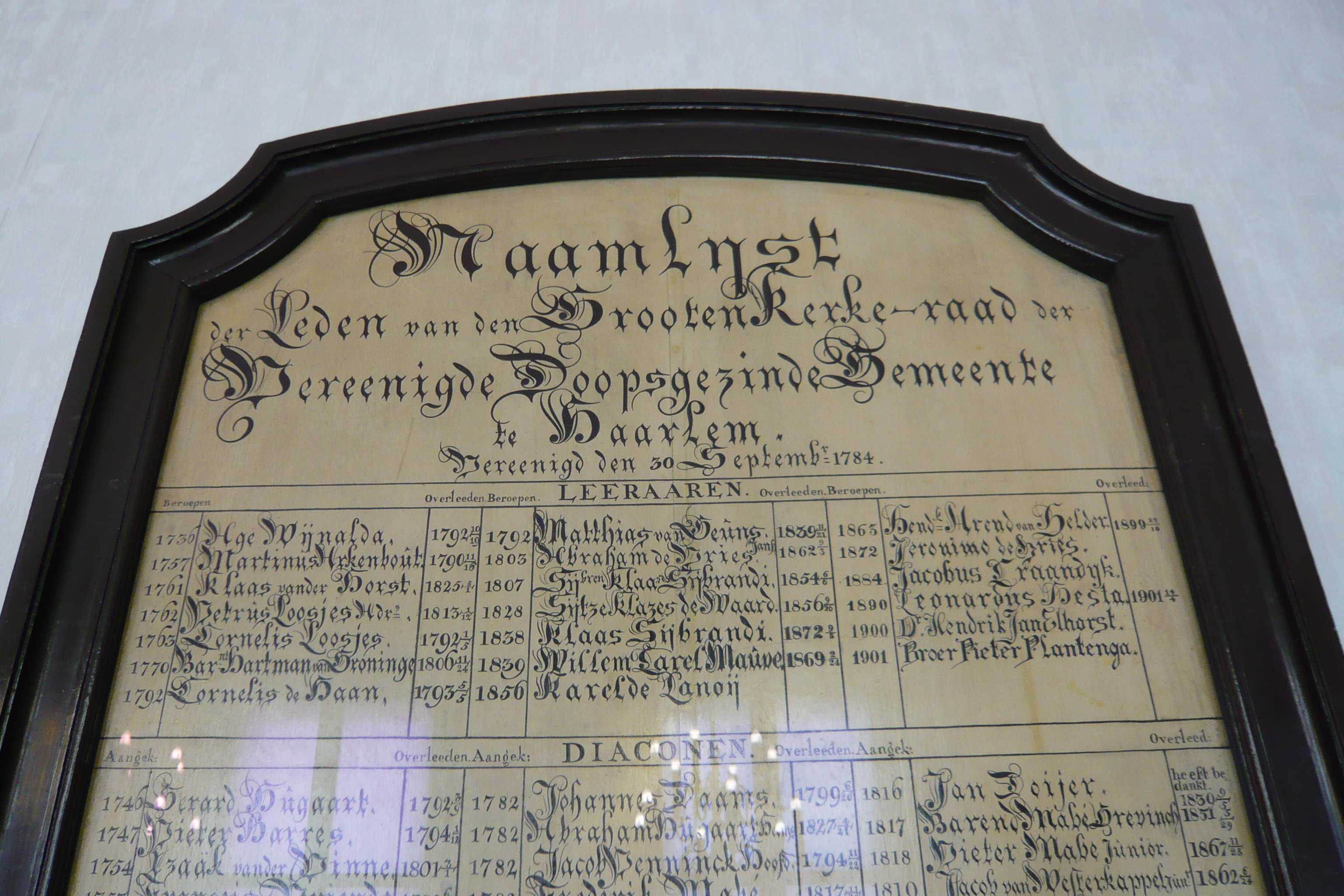
Abraham de Vries' name as "teacher, called 1803" on the name list of the Doopsgezinde kerk, Haarlem

Abraham de Vries (20 April 1773 in Amsterdam – 3 November 1862 in Haarlem) was a Dutch Mennonite minister, author on literature and member of several societies, mainly literary ones.

== Life ==
Abraham was born as the son of merchant Gerrit de Vries and his wife Catherina de Bosch (sister of the poet Hieronymus de Bosch) as brother to Jeronimo de Vries (author). He studied at the Latin School of Amsterdam and was considered to be one of the better students and at the Mennonite Atheneum from 1788 until 1792 and then he studied for teacher at the Mennonite pedagogical academy. In 1795 he was, as a Patriot, appointed as adjunct secretary to the "Committé van Algemeen Welzijn" (Committee of General Welfare) by the Provisional Government with the promise he were to be relieved when a new government would have been elected - but then accepted a permanent position at this Secretariat. At the same time he developed an interest in literature and law (he was member of the society Concordia et Libertate) - but in 1798 he was fired after a month-long imprisonment (after the 1798 revolution he was accused of being an Orangist) and returned to theology but maintained his interest in literature and literary contacts.

In 1799 he graduated and accepted a post as a Mennonite minister in Wormerveer, Grouw, Franeker and Nijmegen. In 1801 he succeeded Jan Kops at the Mennonite congregation in Leiden and two years later he moved to the Mennonite congregation in Haarlem where he would remain minister until his retirement. In 1811 he co-founded the "Algemeene Doopsgezinde Societeit" (General Mennonite Society) and became a board member. His interest and activities in both classical and Dutch literature resulted in his nomination for professor at Hoogeschool Leiden in Dutch and Classical literature, but he always refused - but was in 1820 awarded with a doctorate honoris causae in literature. De Vries compiled a catalogue of the collection of the Public Library in Haarlem in 1848.

He did accept a position as secretary at the Latin schools in his city Haarlem, and was curator of the Haarlem city library (from 1821 until his death) which he built a collection by combining several collections in the city, with the support of King William I and Teylers Stichting. In this capacity (and as an amateur historian) he was also a strong supporter of the lobby to recognize the Haarlem printer Laurens Janszoon Coster as the original inventor of printing and he published some works to support his theories (with the full support of the Koninklijk Nederlandsch Instituut - Royal Dutch Institute).

In 1856 he was appointed as Commandeur in the Order of the Netherlands Lion. He was a member of the Koninklijk Nederlandsch Instituut (1818 - 1825, resigned), of Teylers Eerste Genootschap (a theological society connected with Teylers Stichting and Teylers Museum, awarding annually essay prizes), of several regional societies, the Hollandsche Maatschappij and honorary member of the Maatschappij der Nederlandse Letterkunde in Leiden. He published several other works about literature.

Abraham de Vries was married to Hillegonda van Geuns (daughter of a Haarlem Mennonite minister) and they had two sons and two daughters. He was the father of Gerrit de Vries (prime minister of the Netherlands from 1872 to 1874 and member of the Raad van State) and Prof. M. de Vries.

Dozens of letters to and from De Vries are kept in Leiden University Library.

== Publications ==
- Haarlem's regt op de eer van de uitvinding der boekdrukkunst gehandhaafd, of beknopt overzigt van den stand der zaak, vooral na het onderzoek van den heer De Vries en de toelichtingen van de heeren Schinkel en Noordziek. Amsterdam, Binger, 1843
- Abr. de Vries': Bewijzen voor de echtheid en gelijkenis der oude afbeeldingen van Coster. Ter wederlegging van het "Iets" van den heer Van Westreenen; ten voordeele van het fonds voor de oprigting van het standbeeld. Haarlem, Kruseman, 1847
- [Abraham de Vries]: Catalogus Bibliothecae Publicae Harlemensis. Harlemi, apud Johannem Enschedé et Filios, 1848. First suppl.: 1852. Second suppl.: 1864.
