= Hieronymus de Bosch =

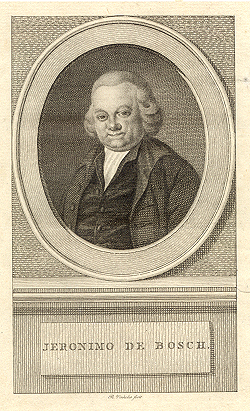
Hieronymus de Bosch or Jeronimo De Bosch (1740–1811)

Hieronymus de Bosch or Jeronimo de Bosch (23 March 1740 in Amsterdam – 1 June 1811 in Leiden) was a Latin poet and notable scholar from the Netherlands. He wrote several books, the most important of which was the "Anthologia Graeca", containing the Anthology of Planudes with Latin translation.

He was a member of Hollandsche Maatschappij der Wetenschappen from 1776, a member of Maatschappij der Nederlandsche Letterkunde from 1780, a member of Zeeuwsch Genootschap der Wetenschappen from 1793, and a member of the Maatschappij ter bevordering van de Landbouw. In 1808 he was asked by Louis Bonaparte to be a member of the committee for the formation of the Koninklijk Instituut along with Martinus van Marum, Jean Henri van Swinden, and Martinus Stuart. He subsequently became member of the institution. His sister married the Haarlem minister and librarian Abraham de Vries. He was the grandfather of the Dutch politician Jeronimo de Bosch Kemper through his daughter, who married Joan Melchior Kemper.

== Works ==
His works were:

- Anthologia Graeca cum versione Latina Hugonis Grotii, Hieronymo de Bosch, Ultrajecti e Τypographia B. Wild & J. Altheer, vol. 1, 1795, vol. 2, 1797 vol. 3 1798, vol. 4, 1810 (entitled Observationes in Anthologiam graecam) (and the continuation of his work, after his death: vol 5, 1822 (written by David Jacobus van Lennep, but also bearing de Bosch's name)), containing the Anthology of Planudes and other poems
- Bibliotheca Boschiana sive catalogus librorum qui studiis inservierunt viri celeberrimi H*. - 1812
- Carmen de aequalitate hominum. - 1793
- Dissertatio De Q. Horatii Flacci Epistola Ad Pisones De Arte Poetica. Published in Commentationes Latinae Tertiae Classis Instituti Regii Belgici [Amsterdam, 7 Volumes, 1818-1855]
- Curae secundae in Horatii Epistolam ad Pisones de arte poetica e sc*. - 1812
- Lofrede op J. R. Deiman. - [1808]
- Poemata. - 1803, 1808
- Poematum appendix. - 1808
- Über Homers Ilias. - 1788
- In acerbum funus Nicolai Bondt, 1796
- In funere Nicolai Vriesii, 1766
