= Jean Henri van Swinden =

Dutch mathematician and physicist (1746–1823)

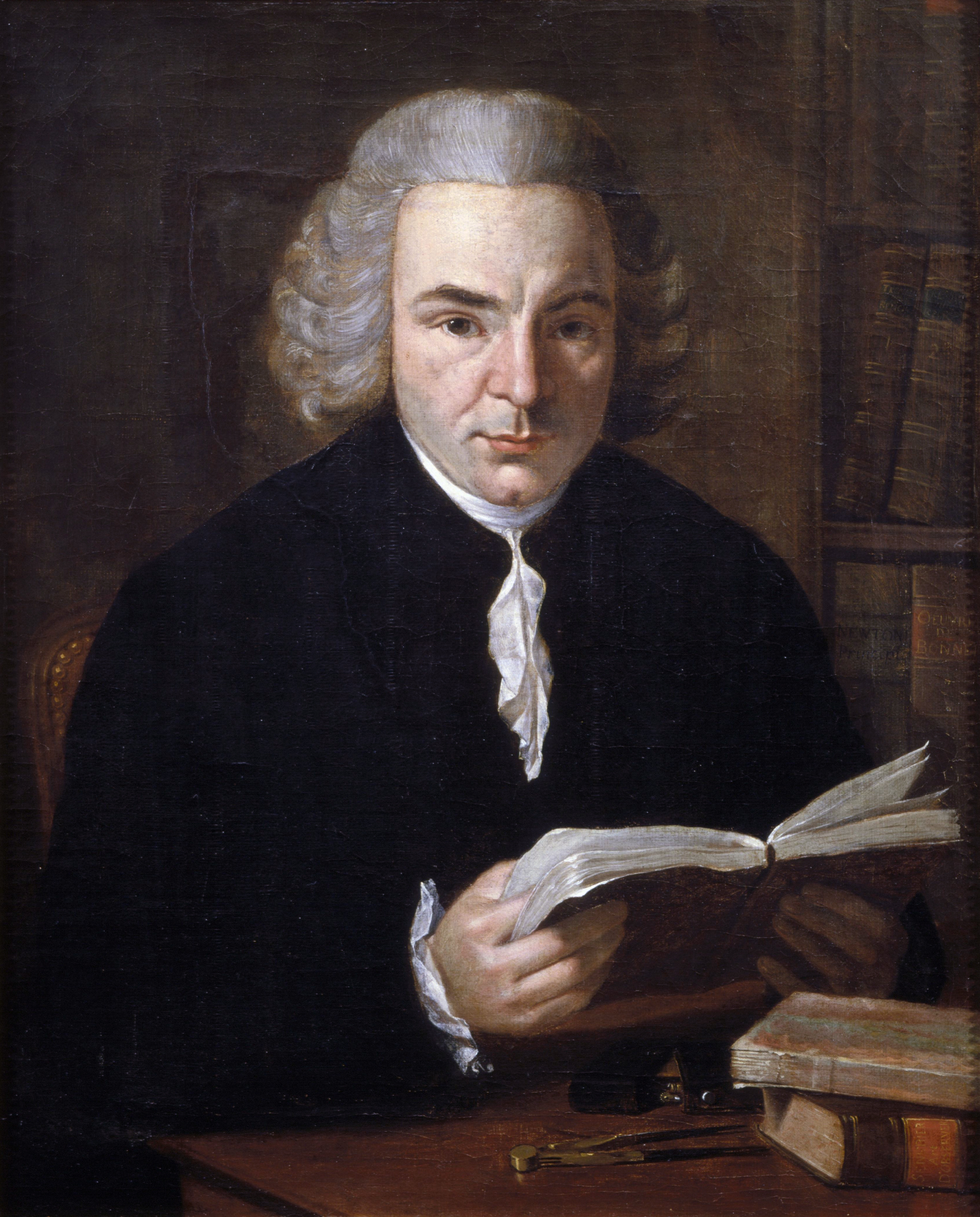
- Born: June 8, 1746; The Hague, Netherlands
- Died: March 9, 1823 (aged 76); Amsterdam, Netherlands
- Education: Leiden University
- Scientific career
- Workplaces: University of Franeker; Athenaeum Illustre of Amsterdam
- Thesis: De attractione (1766)

Jean Henri van Swinden (8 June 1746 – 9 March 1823) was a Dutch mathematician and physicist who taught at the University of Franeker and in the Athenaeum Illustre of Amsterdam.

== Biography ==
His parents were the lawyer Phillippe van Swinden and Marie Anne Tollosan. He was trained 1763–1766 at the Leiden University, where he became doctor of philosophy on 12 June 1766 with the thesis De attractione. He became professor at the University of Franeker the same year, where he continued to study and conduct research as well as teach. In 1776 he won a prize from the French Academy of Sciences along with Charles-Augustin de Coulomb for his work on Earth's magnetic field, and the relationship between magnetism and electricity. A year later he won a prize from the Bavarian Academy of Sciences and Humanities. His description of Eise Eisinga's planetarium in 1780 was later republished.

In 1785 he moved to Amsterdam where he became professor at the Athenaeum Illustre of Amsterdam. There he was instrumental in introducing a house numbering system (useful for the postal service) and in 1795 he directed the first census. In 1798 he led a commission to report on the state of the health of the inhabitants of Amsterdam, based on the results of the census. He was part of an international commission to determine the length of the meter, as a first step to introducing the metric system in the Netherlands. His lectures at Felix Meritis from 1777 onwards on this subject were bundled and published as Verhandeling over volmaakte maaten en gewigten in 1802.

His international good name led him to be appointed as representative during the French occupation. He was one of the founders appointed by Louis Bonaparte in 1808 for the Koninklijk Instituut van Wetenschappen along with Martinus van Marum, Martinus Stuart, and Jeronimo de Bosch.

== Legacy ==
The Van Swinden Laboratorium, today the Nederlands Meetinstituut, was named after him in 1971 and several streets in Amsterdam are named after him.

== Sources ==
- P.C. Molhuysen en P.J. Blok (ed.), Nieuw Nederlandsch biografisch woordenboek, Part 4, A.W. Sijthoff, Leiden, 1918
