= Martinus Stuart =

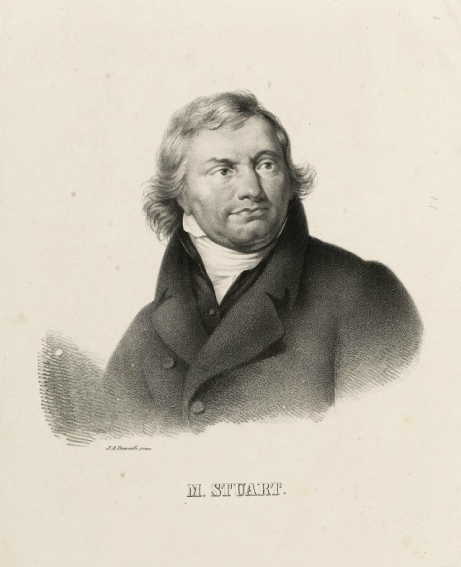
- Martinus Stuart (around 1790 after Jean Augustin Daiwaille)
- Born: 4 October 1765; Rotterdam, the Netherlands
- Died: 22 November 1826 (aged 61); Amsterdam, the Netherlands
- Occupation: pastor / historian
- Known for: De mensch zoo als hij voorkomt op den bekenden aardbol
- Movement: Remonstrants, Dutch nationalism

Signature
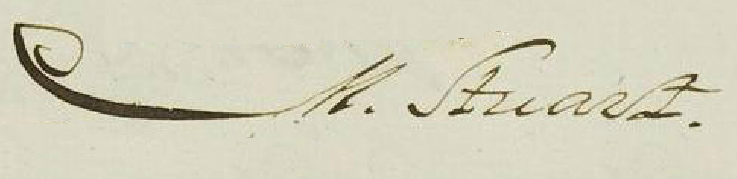

Martinus Stuart (Rotterdam, 4 October 1765 – Amsterdam, 22 November 1826) was a Dutch pastor and historian. He was appointed by King William I as historian of the kingdom.

== Life and work ==
Stuart was born in Rotterdam in 1765 as the son of merchant Jacob Stuart and Johanna van Eyk. He studied theology at the remonstrants seminar in Amsterdam. In 1787 he was confirmed as remonstrants pastor in Dokkum and in 1790 as remonstrants pastor in Utrecht. From 1793 until his death in 1826, Stuart was a Remonstrants pastor in Amsterdam, but he worked and attracted to non-remonstrants. Politically, he was patriotic Protestant. He was an advocate of a merger of all Protestant churches. An idea that he tried to realize in vain. Stuart was not only a pastor but also a historian. He has published, among other things, a thirty-part work on Roman history and various historical works on national history. Both King Louis Napoleon and King William I appreciated his historical knowledge. He received assignments from both of them to describe national history. Louis Napoleon appointed him Knight in the Order of Merit and member of the Royal Institute. King William I appointed him "historian of the kingdom." From this assignment arose the Yearbooks of the Kingdom of the Netherlands , a sixteen volume. According to the biographical lexicon for the history of Dutch Protestantism, "his work was characterized by a less critical treatment of matter".

Stuart married Theodora Magdalena Robbé on 19 September 1787 in Steenwijk. Fourteen children were born from their marriage. Stuart died in November 1826 in his hometown Amsterdam. The eulogy by Cornelis Willem Westerbaen on 31 December 1826 in the Remonstrant church of Amsterdam appeared in 1827 in print.

== Bibliography (selection) ==
- Roman history (Romeinsche geschiedenis), 30 volumes, Amsterdam, 1793–1810, reissue in 20 volumes, 1824-1826
- Patriotic History from 1752 to 1784 (Vaderlandsche Historie van 1752 tot 1784), Amsterdam, 1826
- Yearbooks of the Kingdom of the Netherlands from 1814 to 1822 (Jaarboeken van het Koningrijk der Nederlanden van 1814 tot 1822), 16 volumes, Amsterdam, 1826
- New Dutch Yearbooks (Nieuwe Nederlandsche Jaarboeken), 6 volumes, Amsterdam, 1813/1814
- Man as he appears on the known globe (De mensch zoo als hij voorkomt op den bekenden aardbol), original print, Amsterdam, 1802–1807, reissued in 1818 and in 1835/1836

== Notes and references ==
=== Sources ===
Zilverberg, S.B.J. (1998). "Stuart, Martinus". Biografisch lexicon voor de geschiedenis van het Nederlands protestantisme. Kampen: Kok.
