= Teylers Fossil Room II =

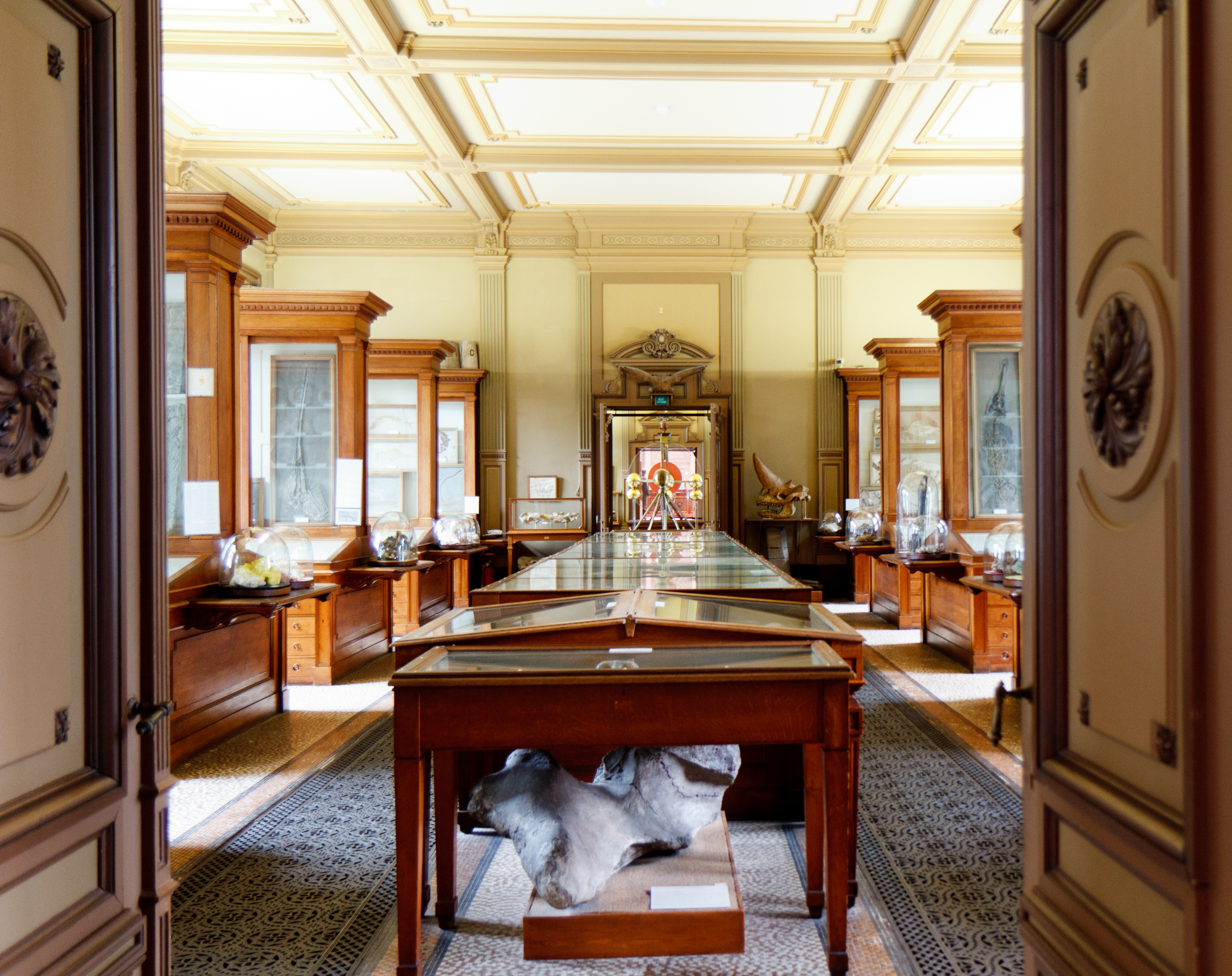
- Fossil room II
- Building: Teylers Museum
- Location: Haarlem
- Country: Netherlands
- Coordinates: 52.3804°N 4.6403°E
- Purpose: Fossil room
- Architect: Ad van der Steur Jr.

The Fossil room II is one of two paleontological display rooms in Teylers Museum. The Fossil room II was built in 1885 as an extension of the first Fossil room I, under the direction of the architect Ad van der Steur Jr.

== History ==
The Teylers Museum was originally opened in 1784 as a museum of science and arts. During the course of the next few decades the number of natural history objects grew, and under J.G.S. van Breda the Paleontological collection grew with the purchase of various collections based on his in-depth knowledge and personal network. Tiberius Winkler began the task of cataloguing, and was thus able to sort the collection into more or less important objects, and to display these, the idea of a new museum slowly gained ground with the directors.

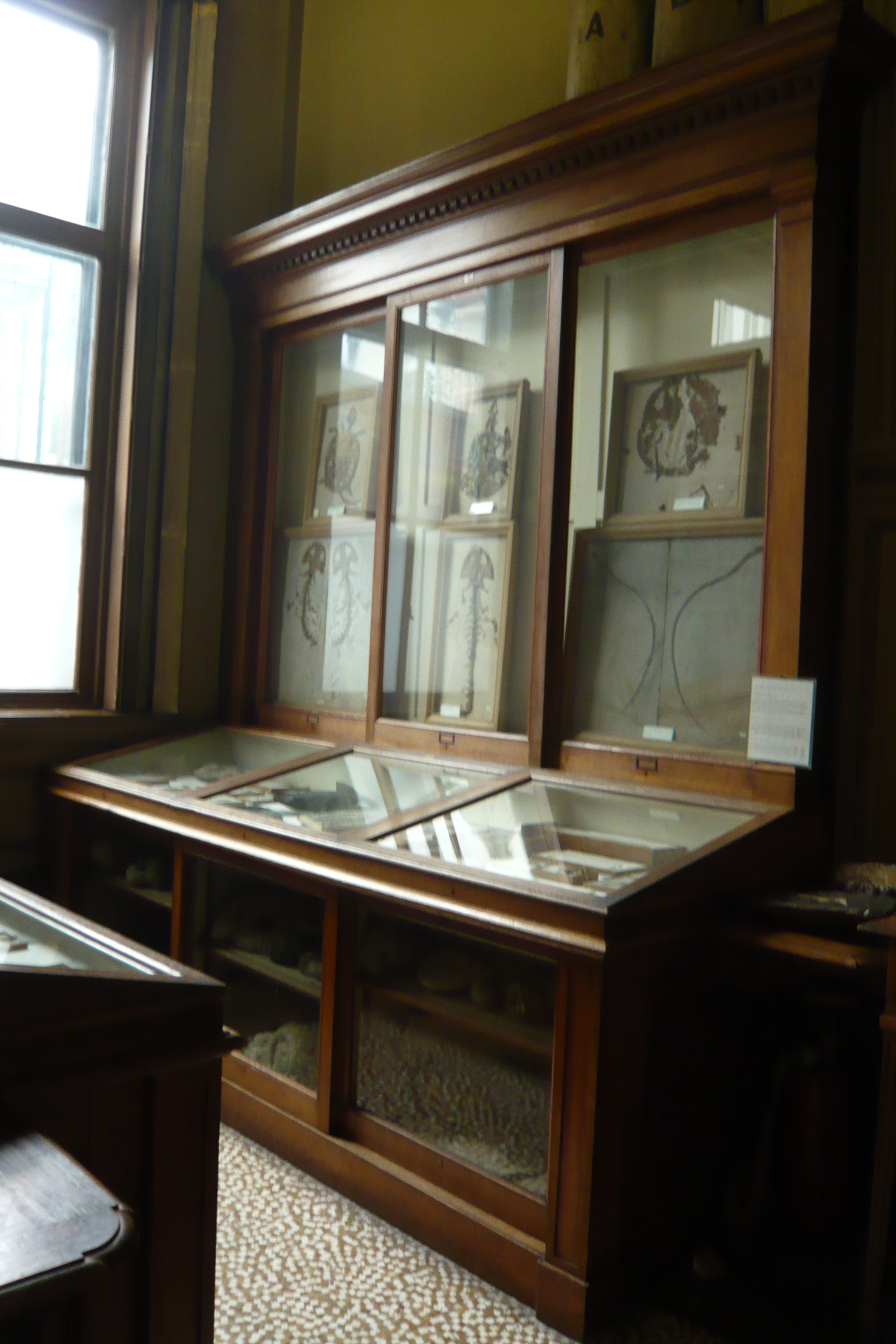
Cabinet 1 with salamander and tortoise holotypes

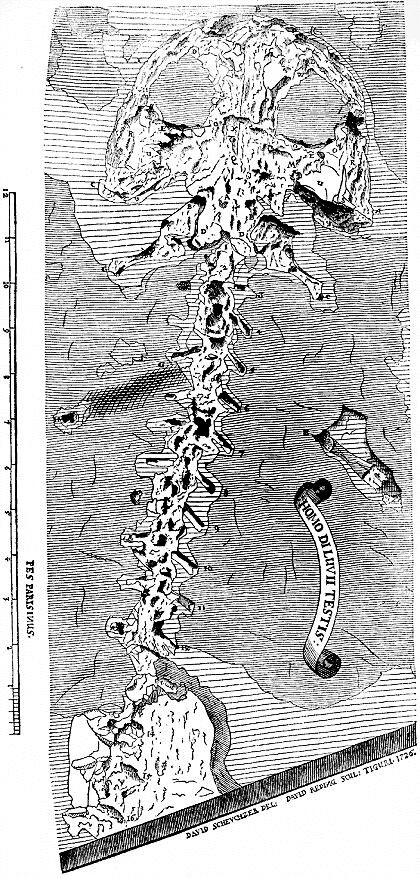
Swiss naturalist Johann Jakob Scheuchzer's Homo diluvii testis in 1726

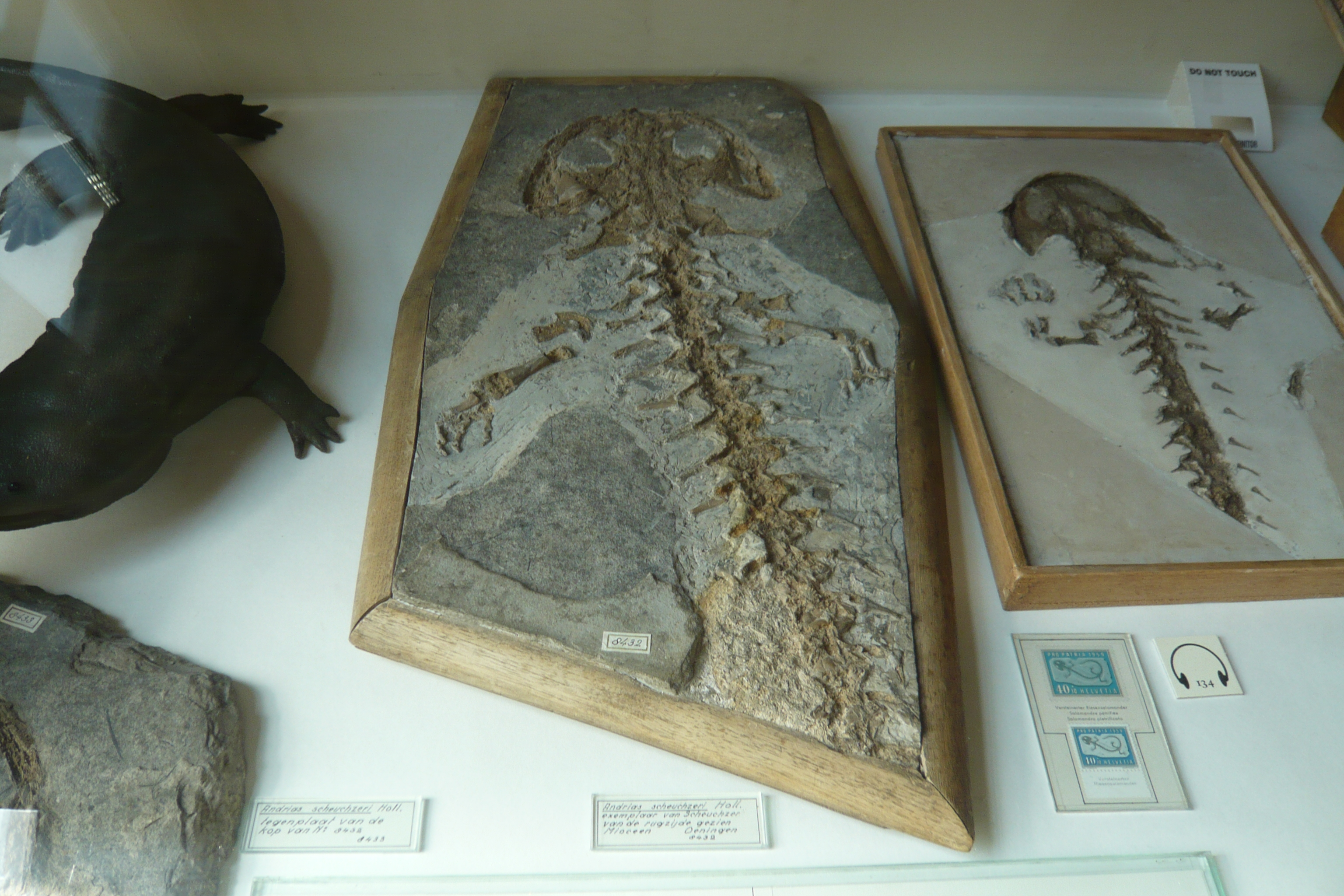
The Andrias scheuchzeri holotype from Oeningen Miocene, where the extra uncovering of arms was done by Georges Cuvier

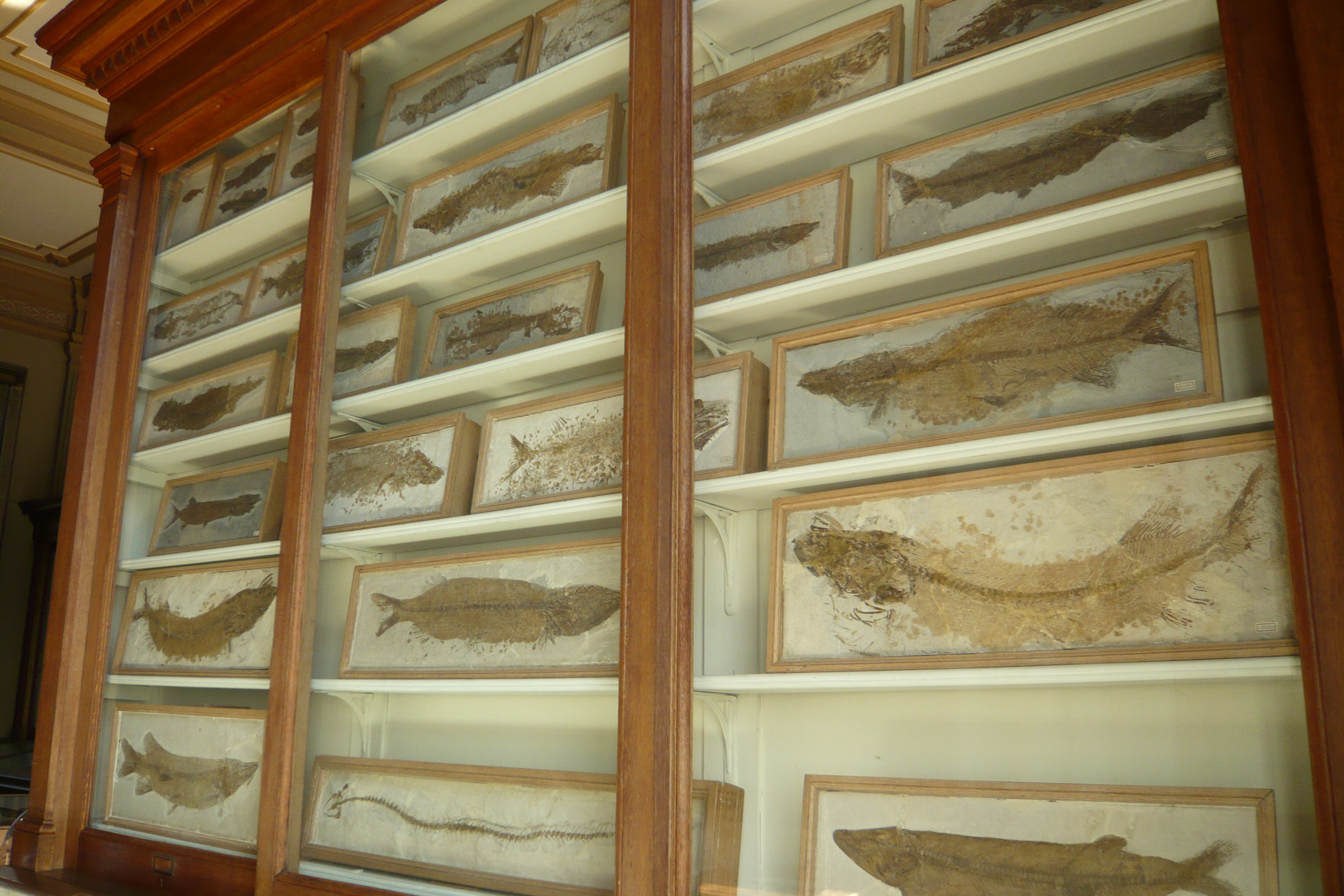
Cabinet 2 with fish fossils, the personal specialty of Winkler

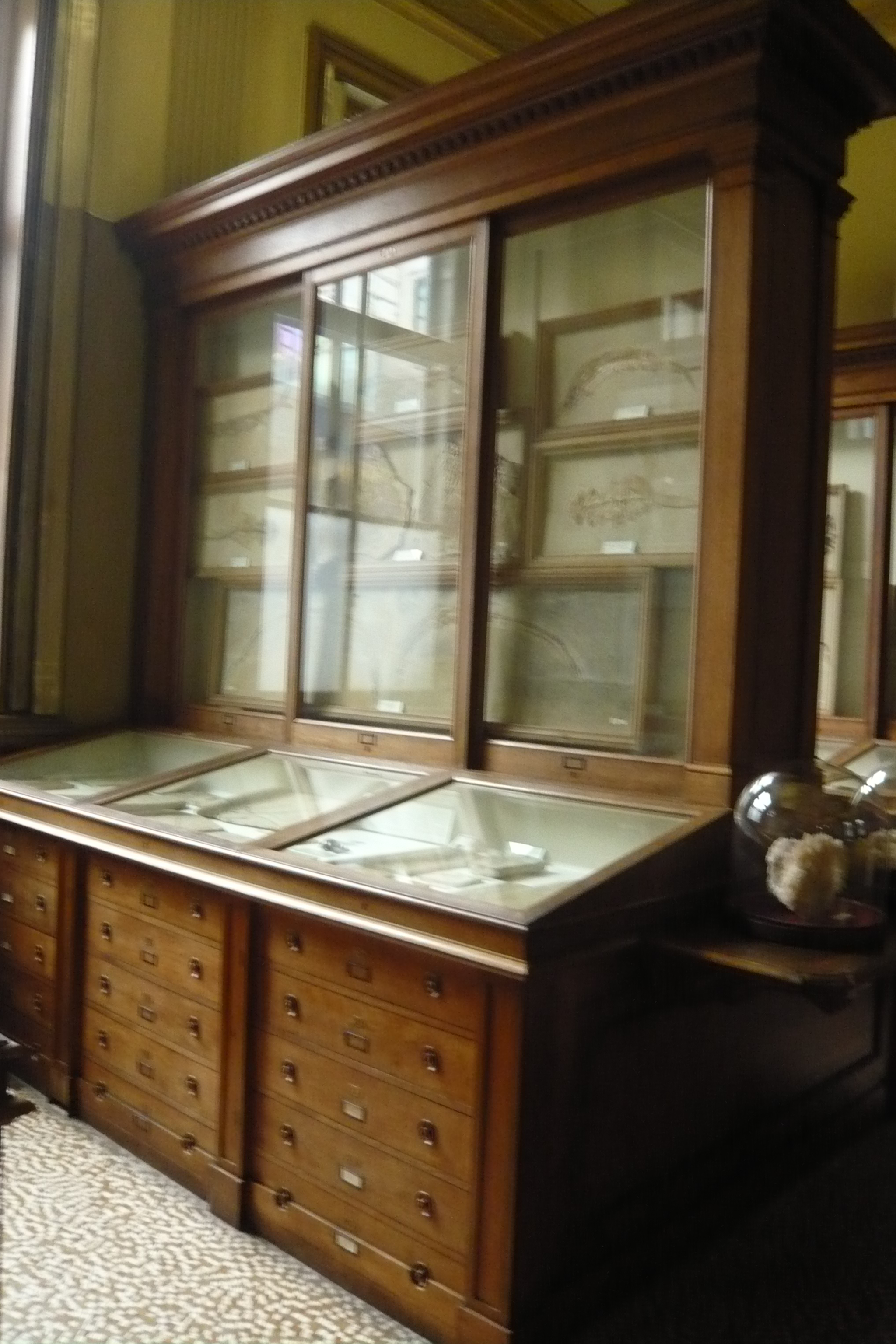
Cabinet 3

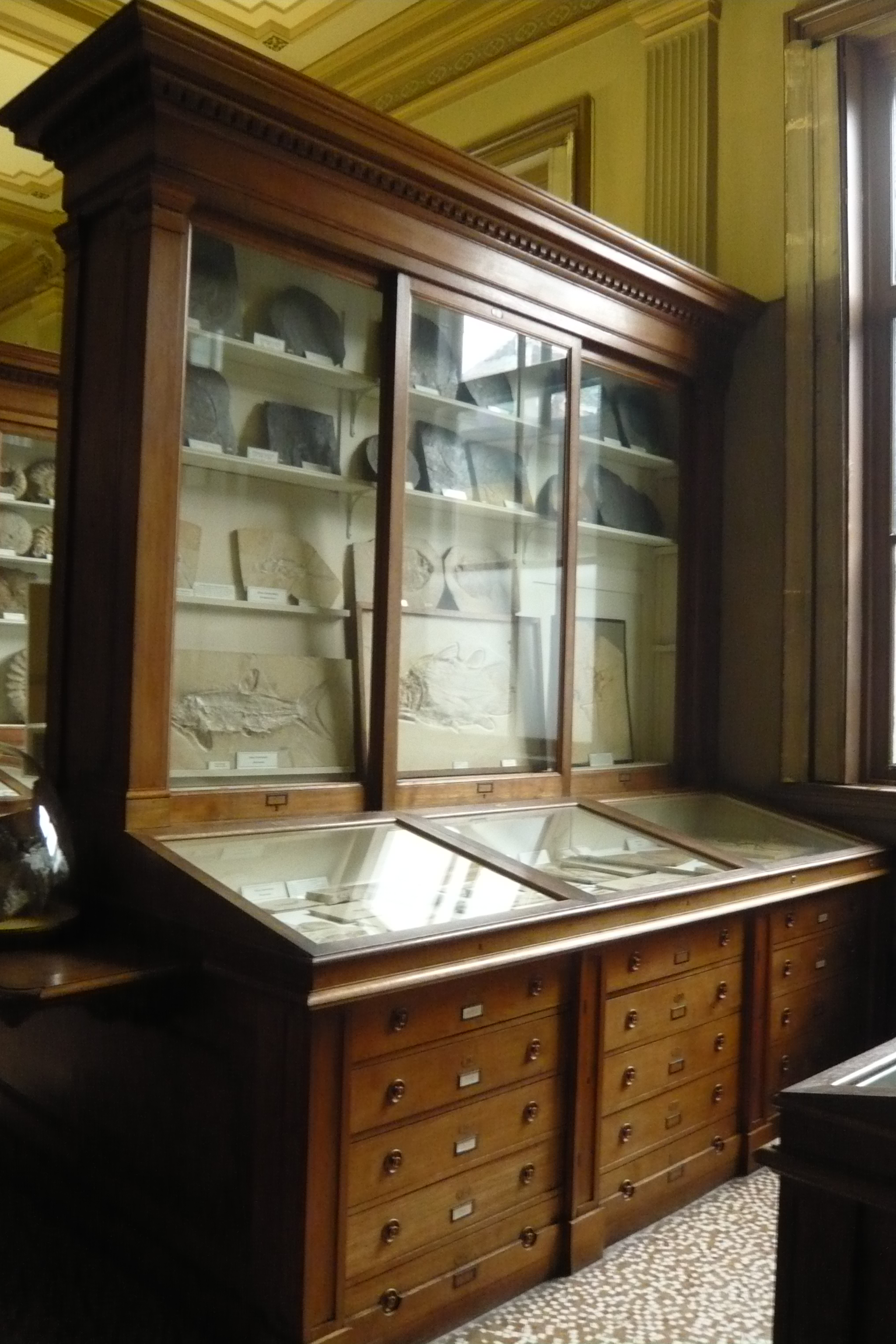
Cabinet 4 with fish

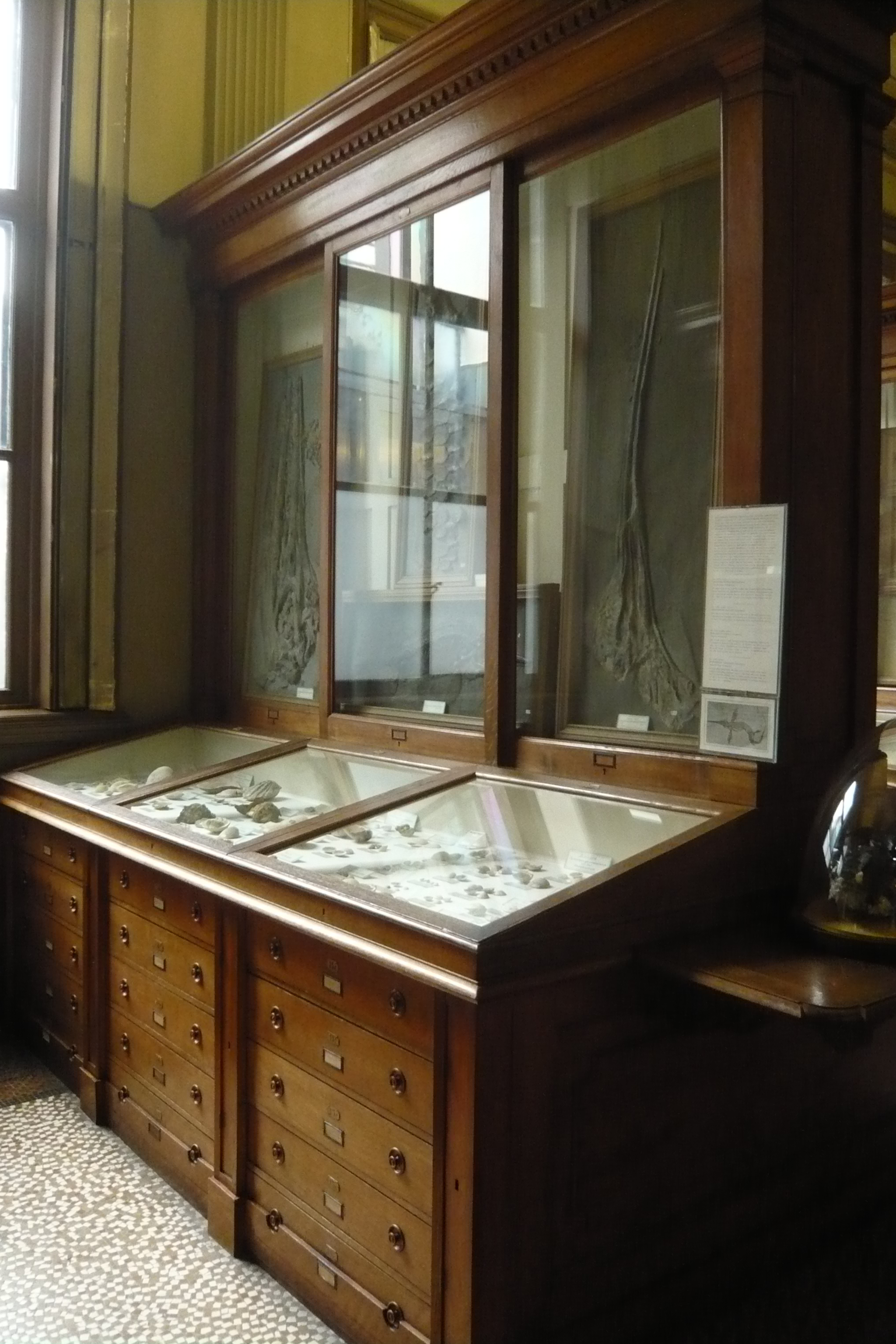
Cabinet 5

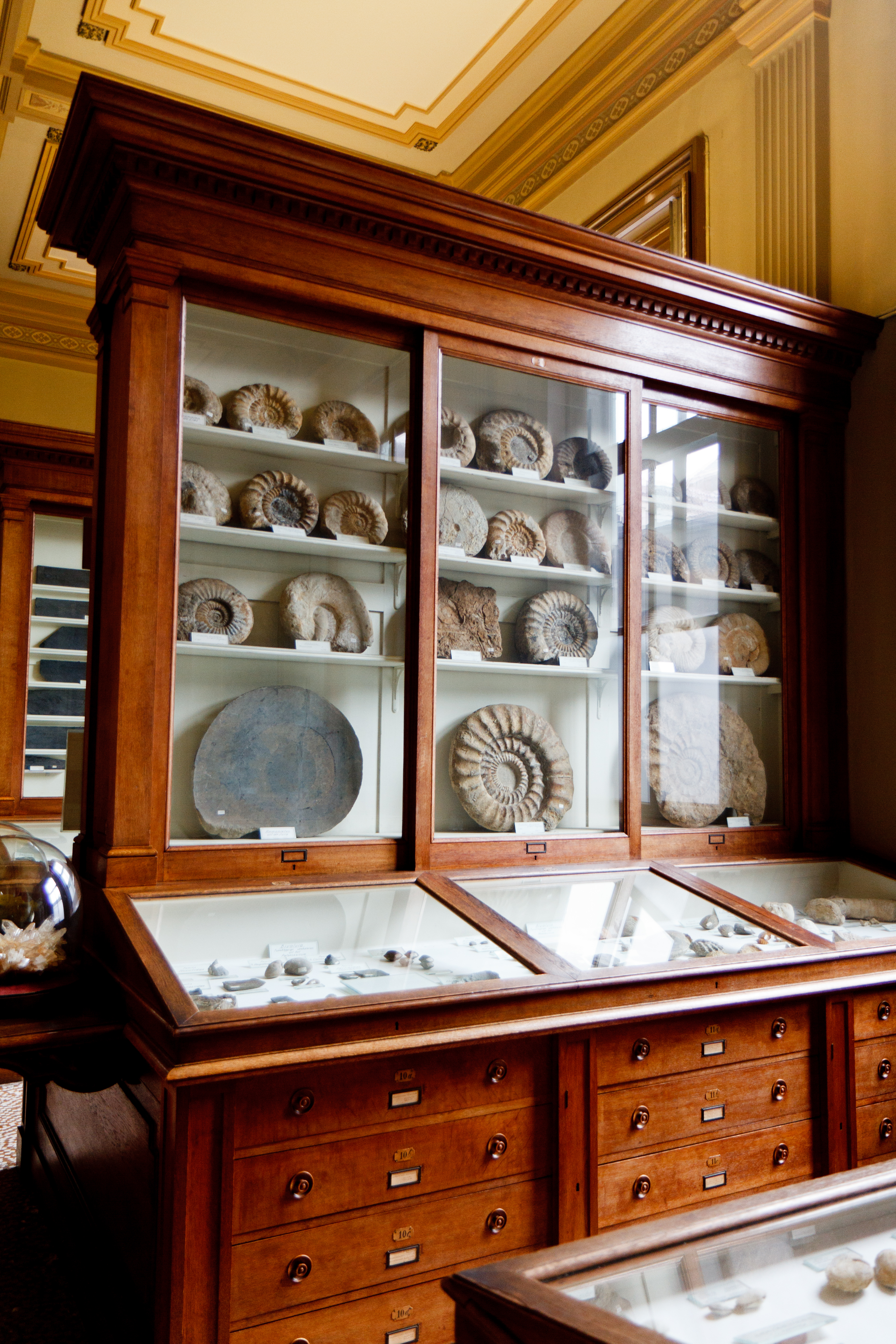
Cabinet 6 with nautilus shells

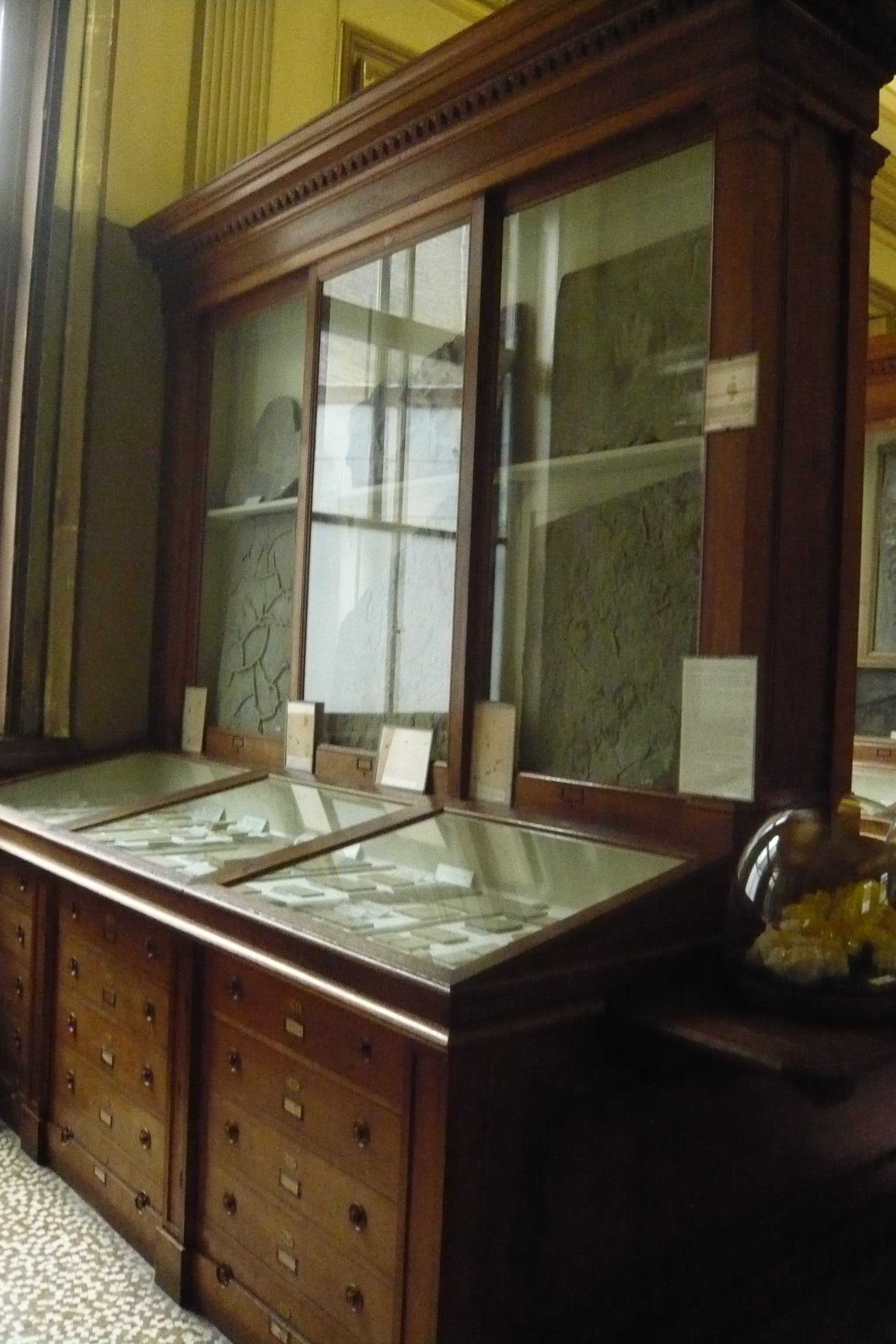
Cabinet 7

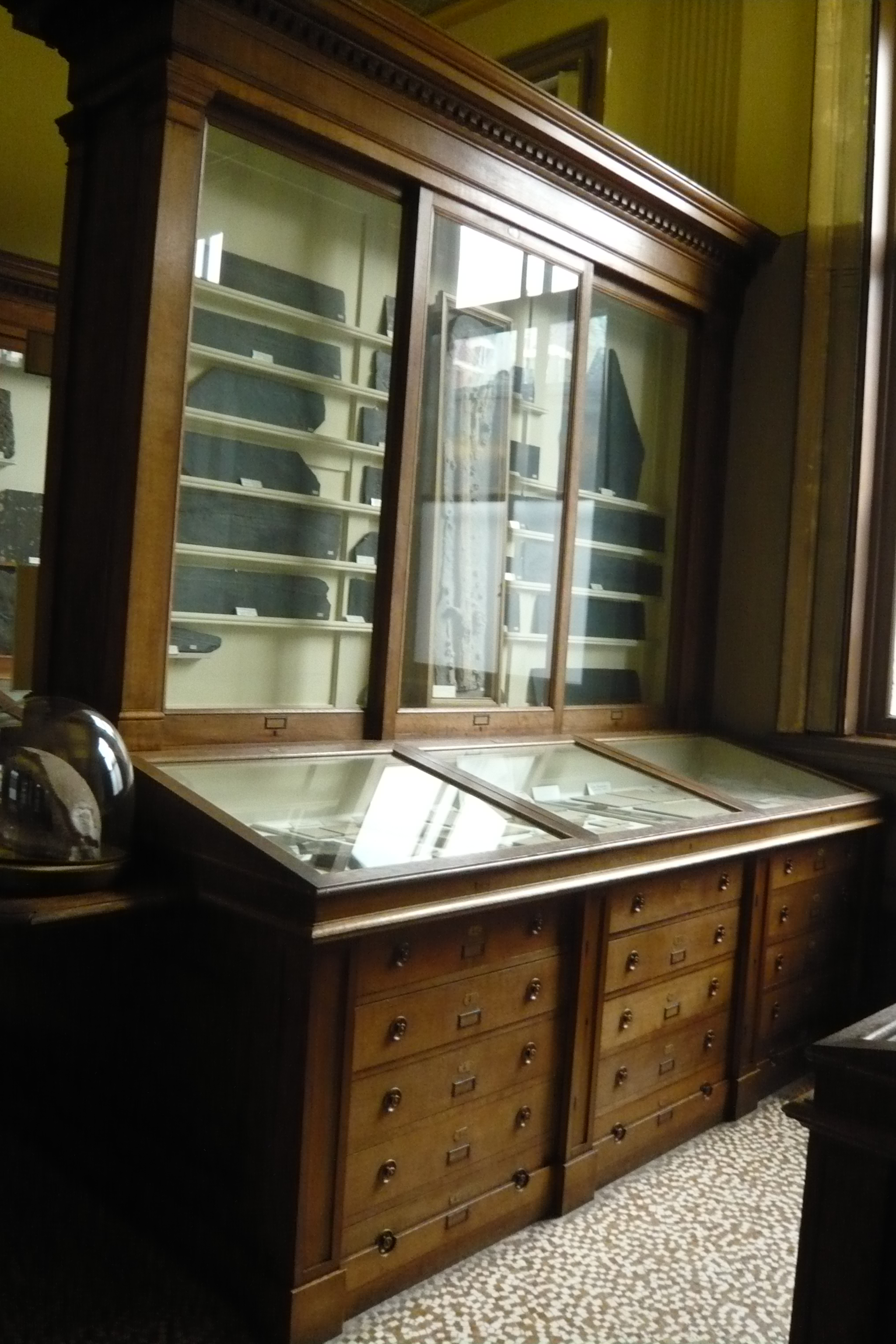
Cabinet 8

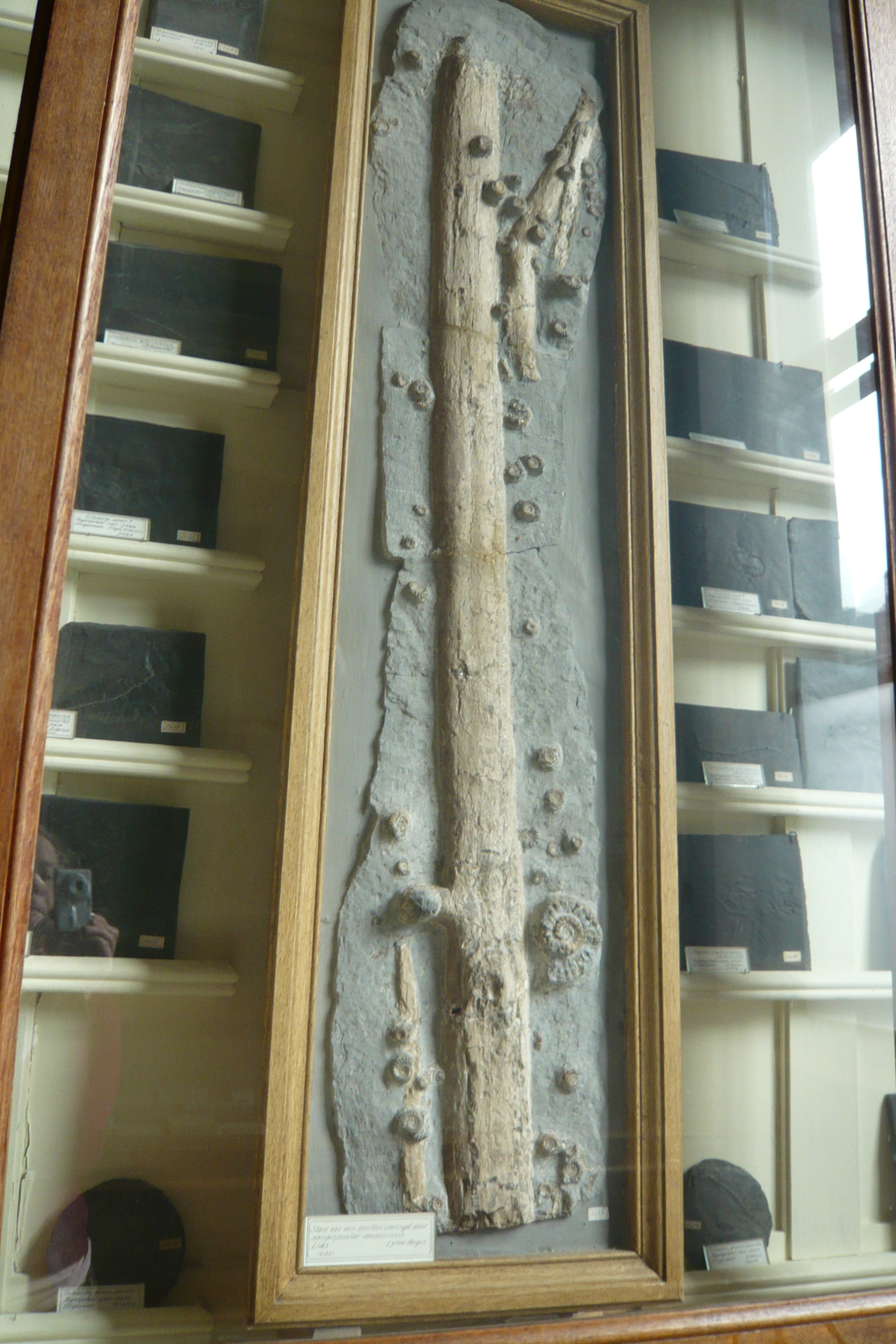
Cabinet 8 - detail with long fossil

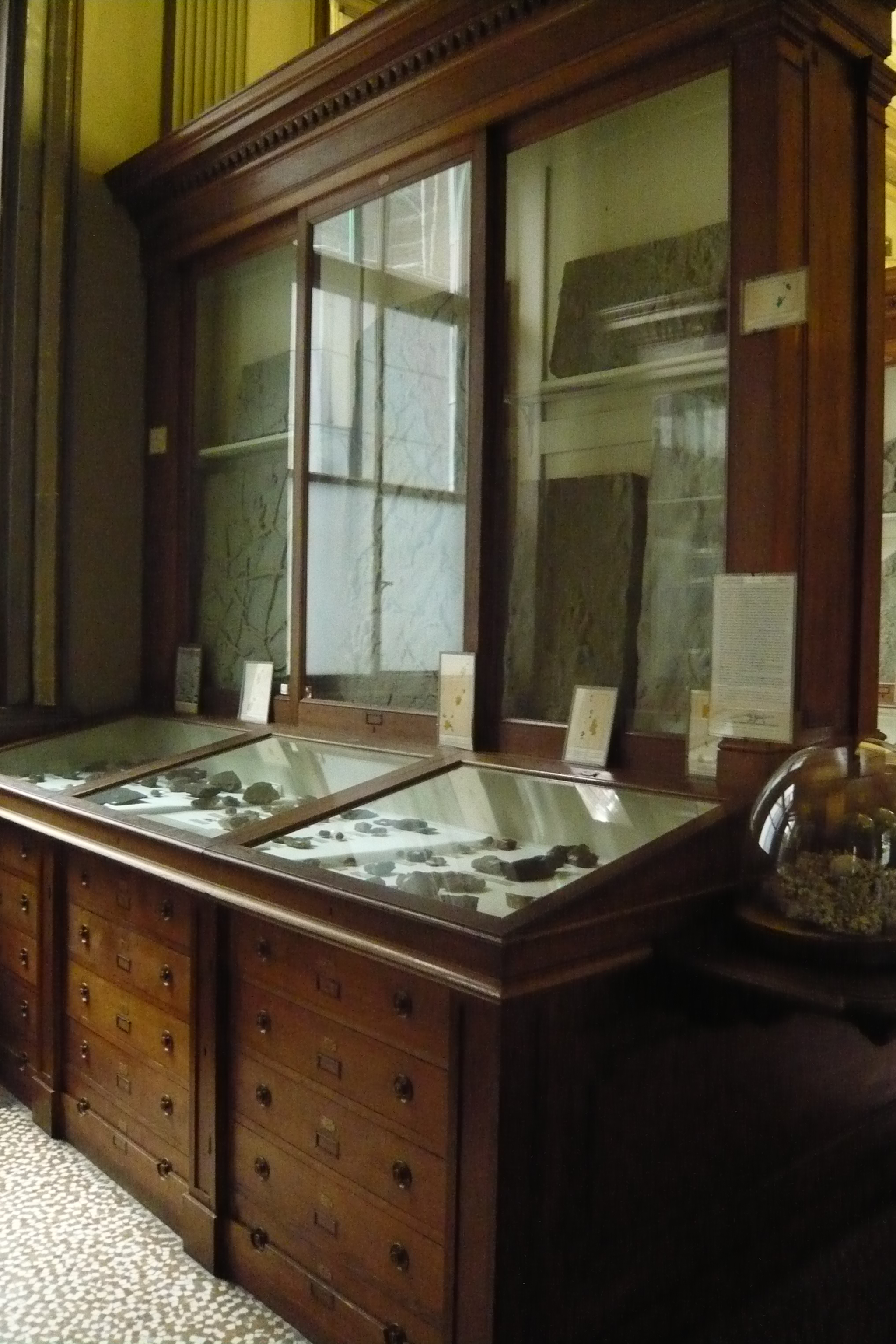
Cabinet 9

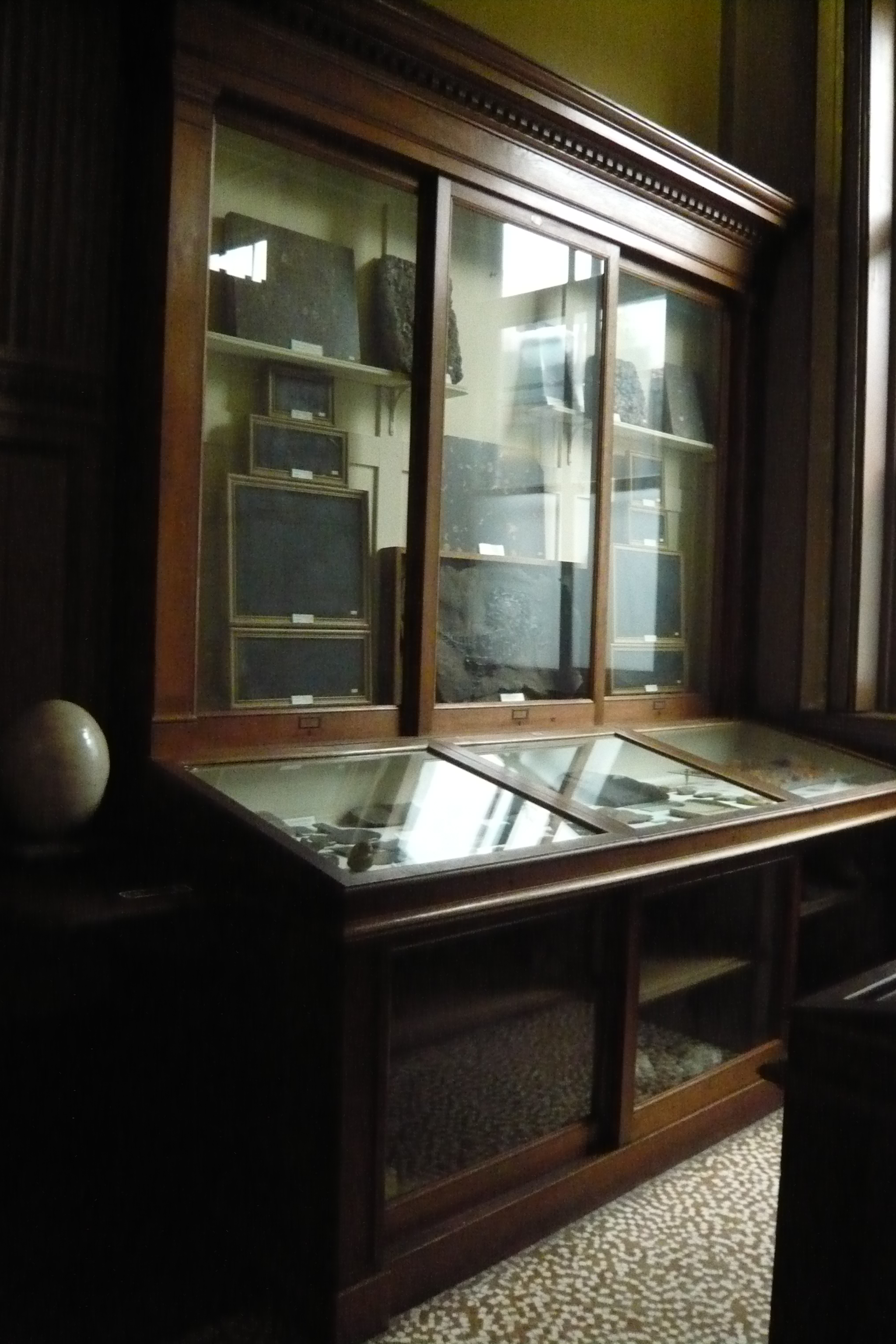
Cabinet 10 with Lügensteine and insects in amber

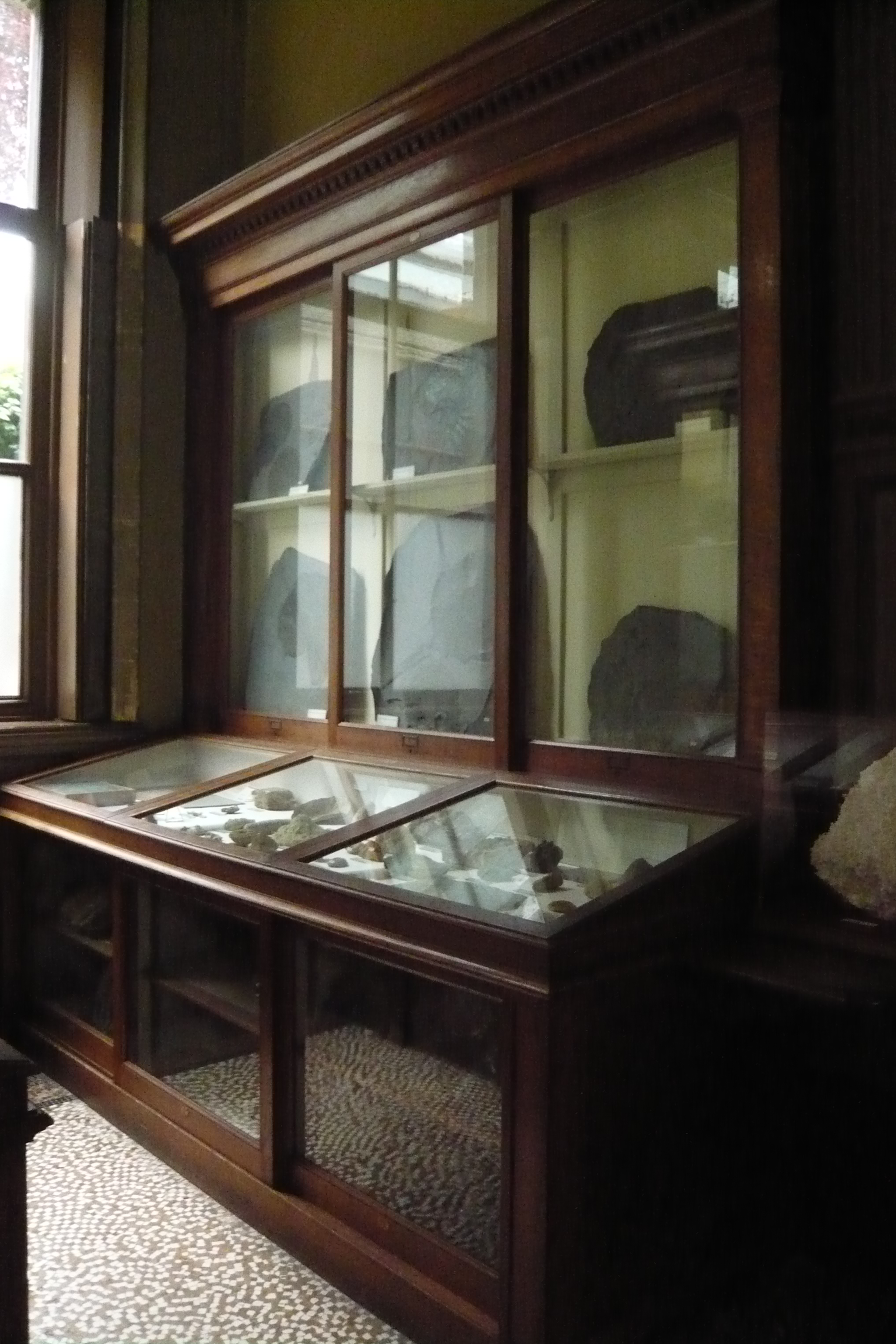
Cabinet 11

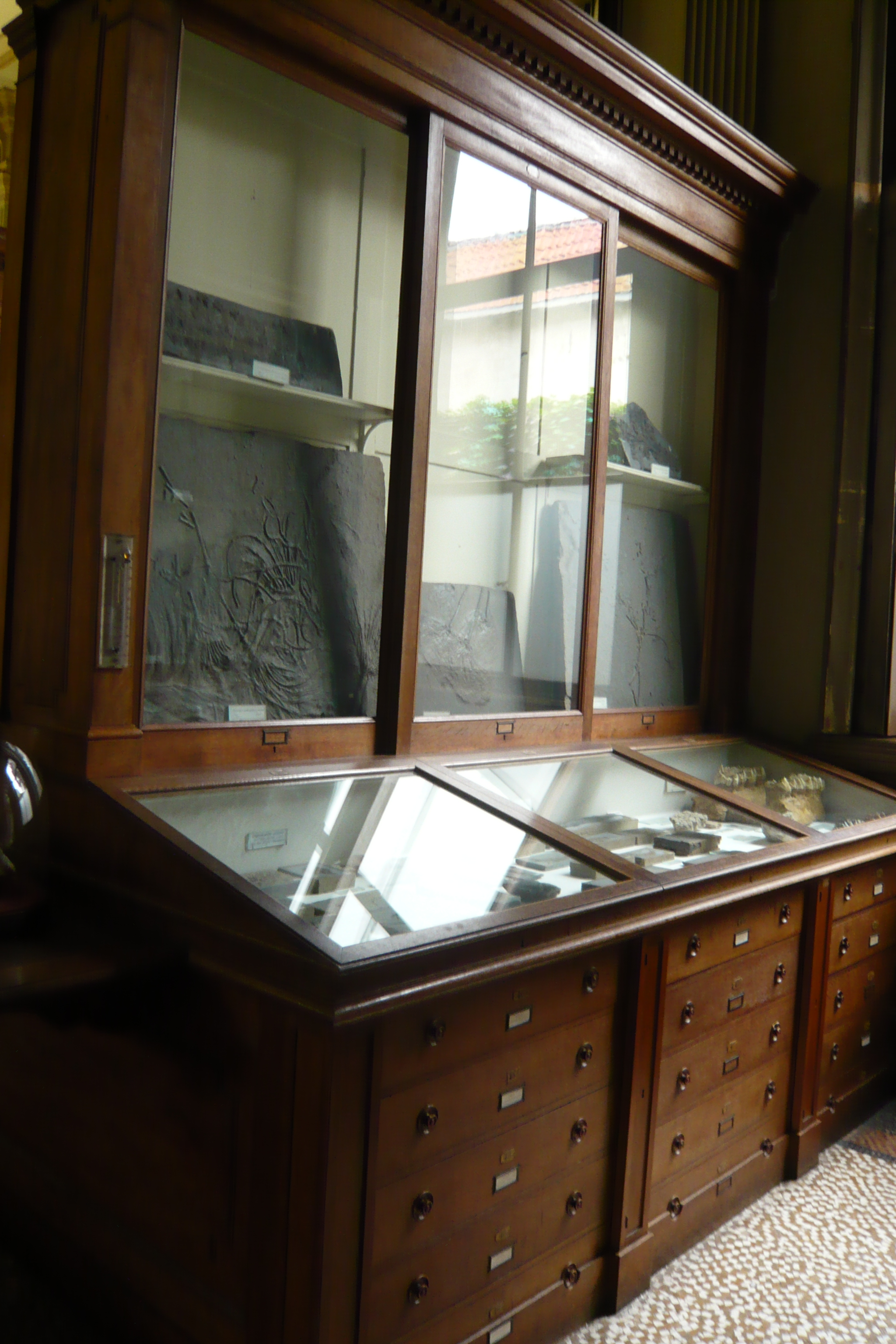
Cabinet 12

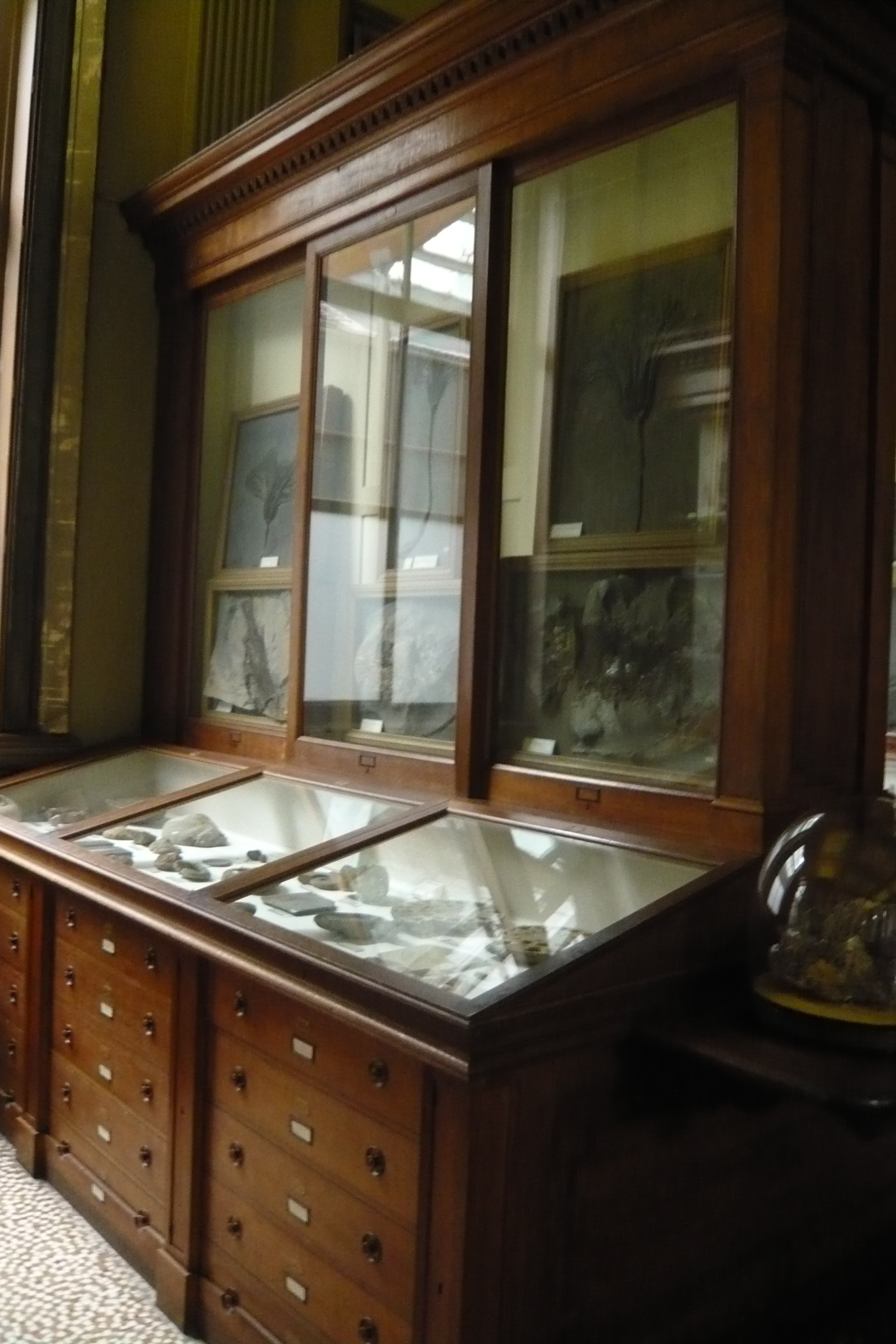
Cabinet 13

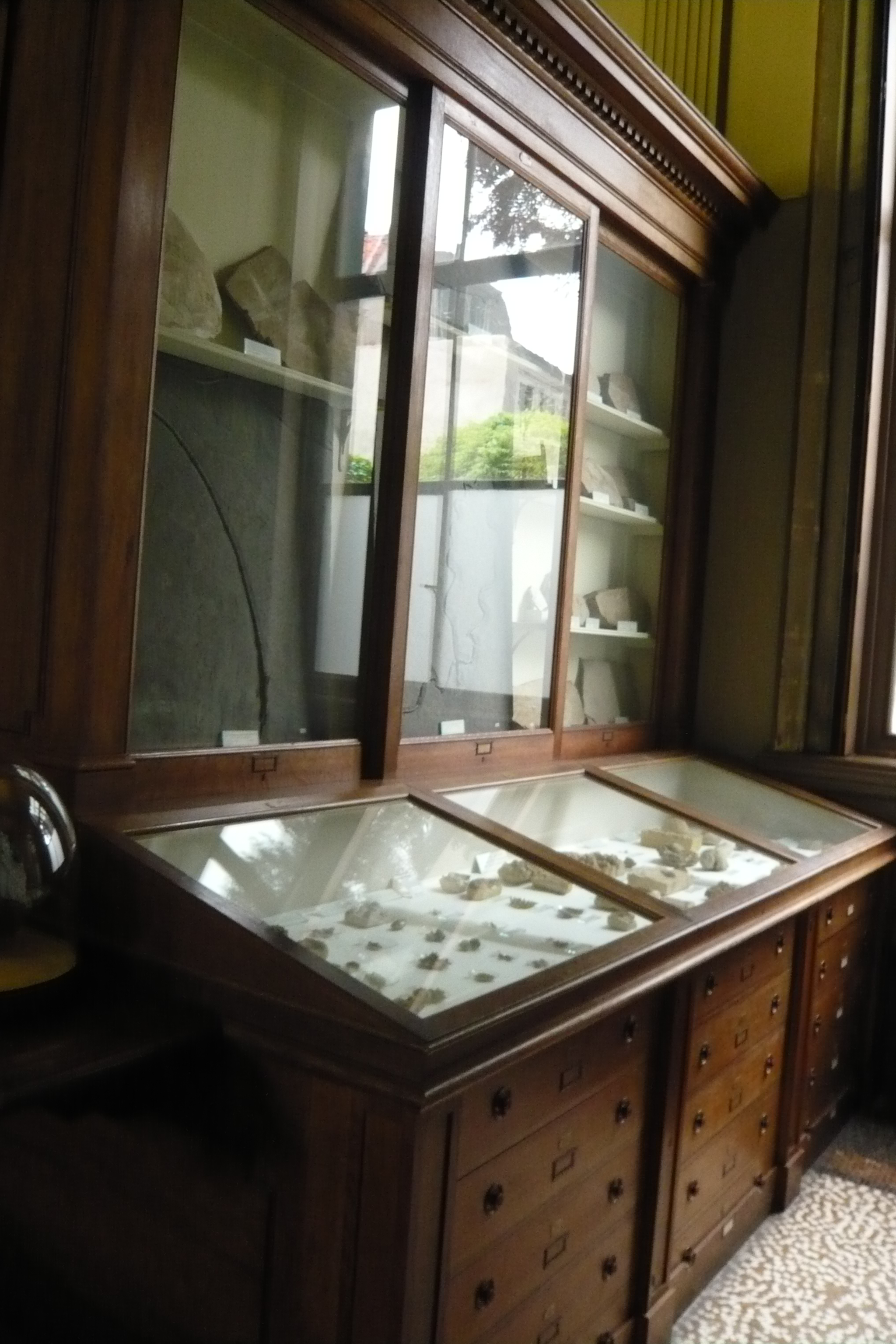
Cabinet 14

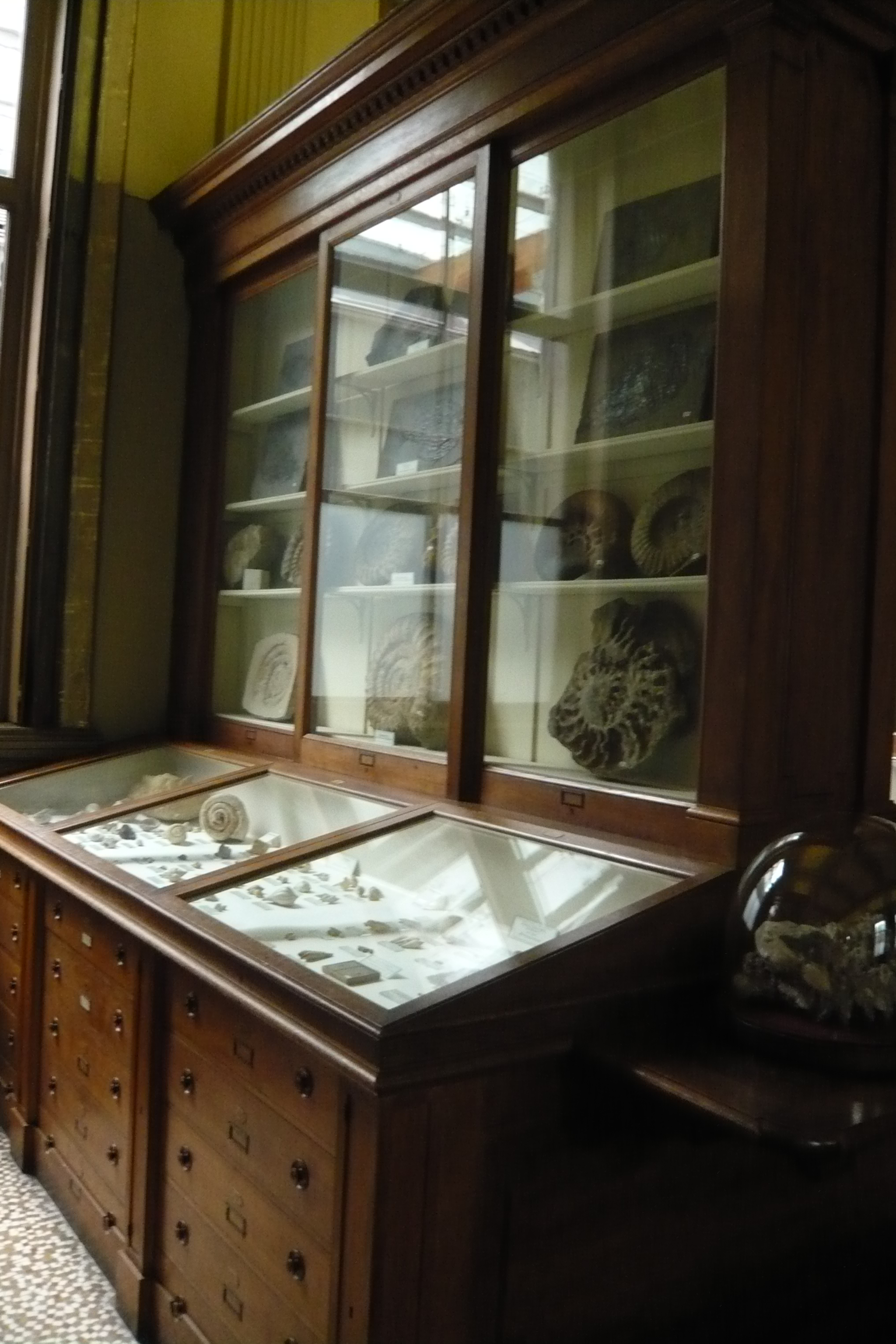
Cabinet 15

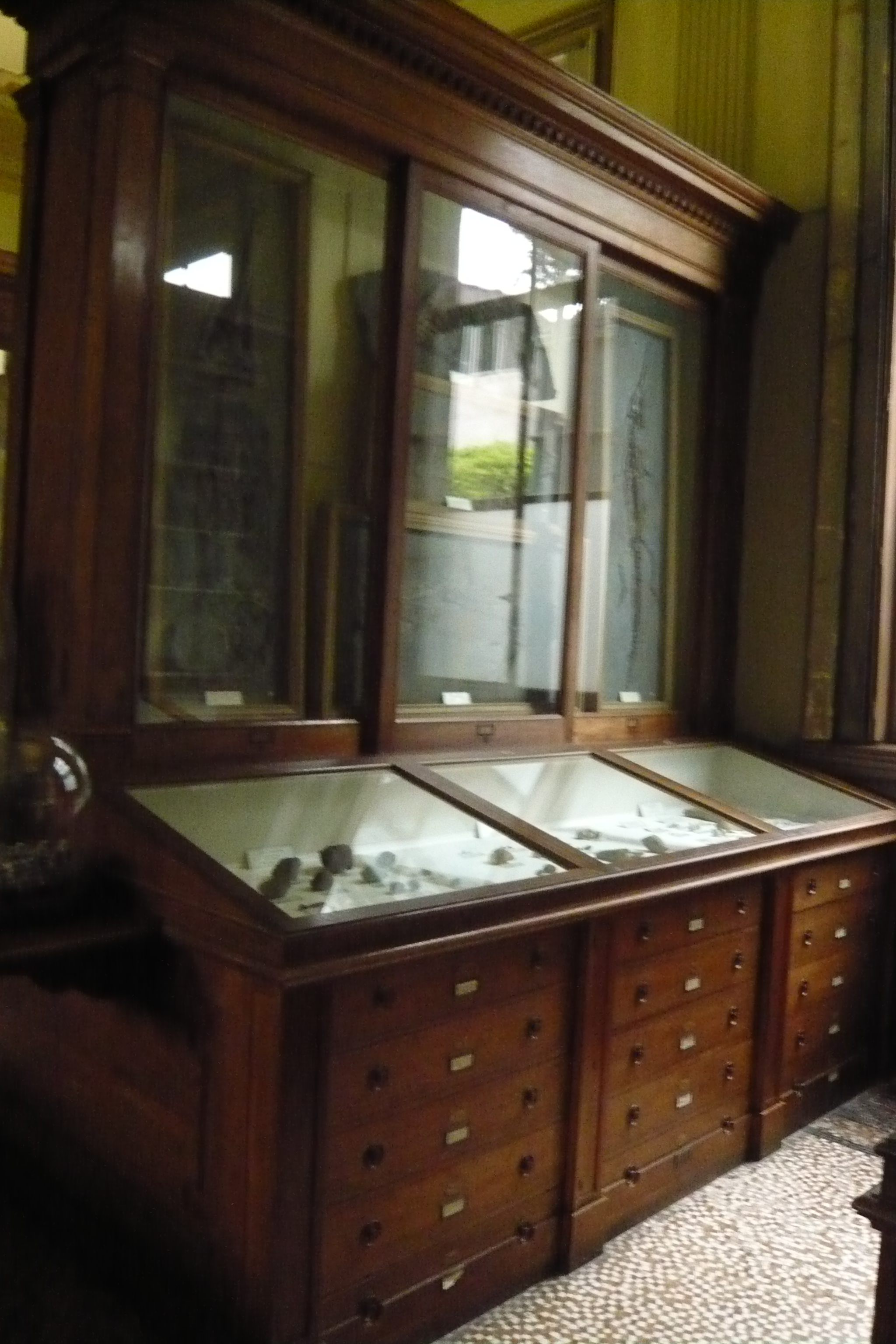
Cabinet 16

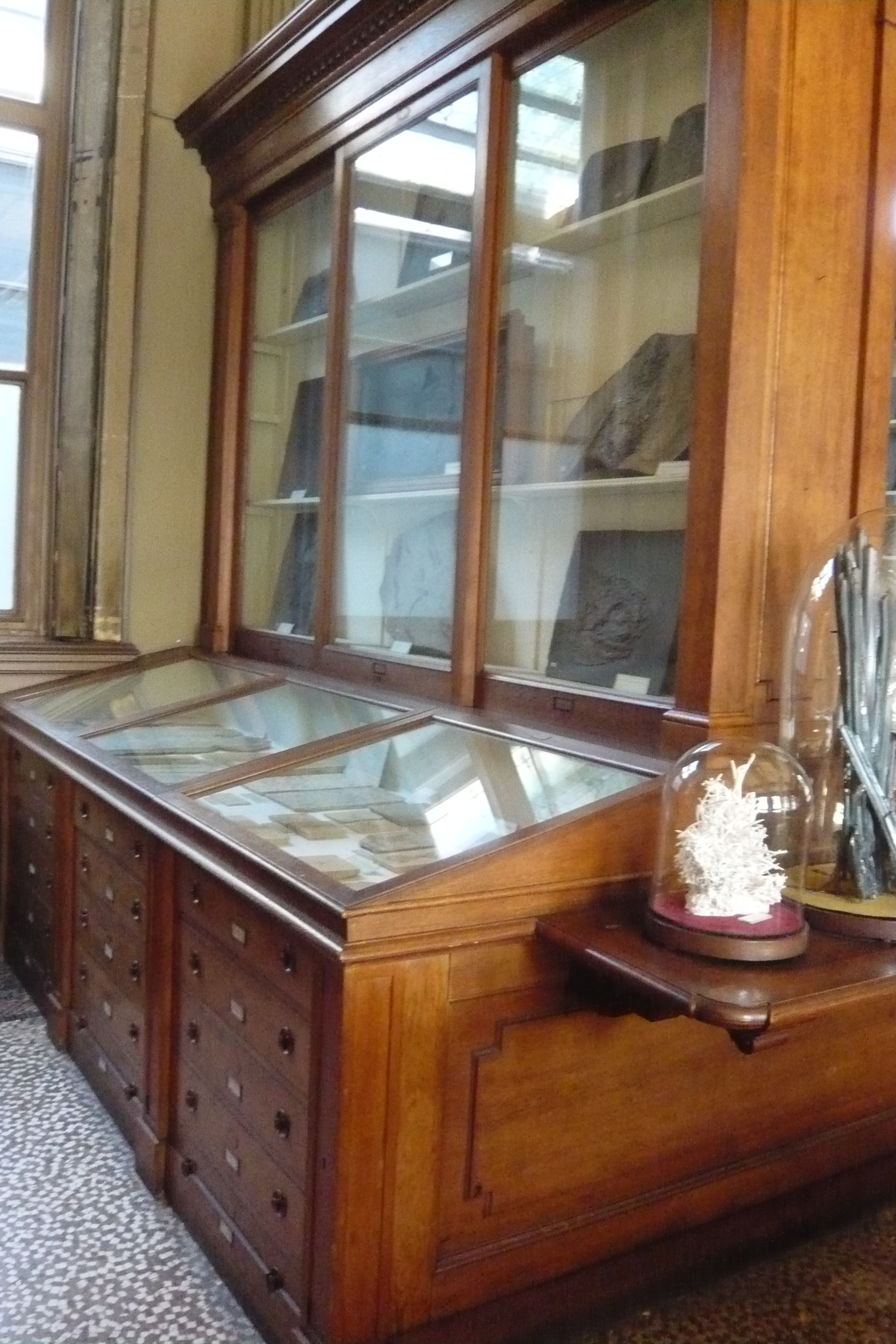
Cabinet 17 with objects from the Jura

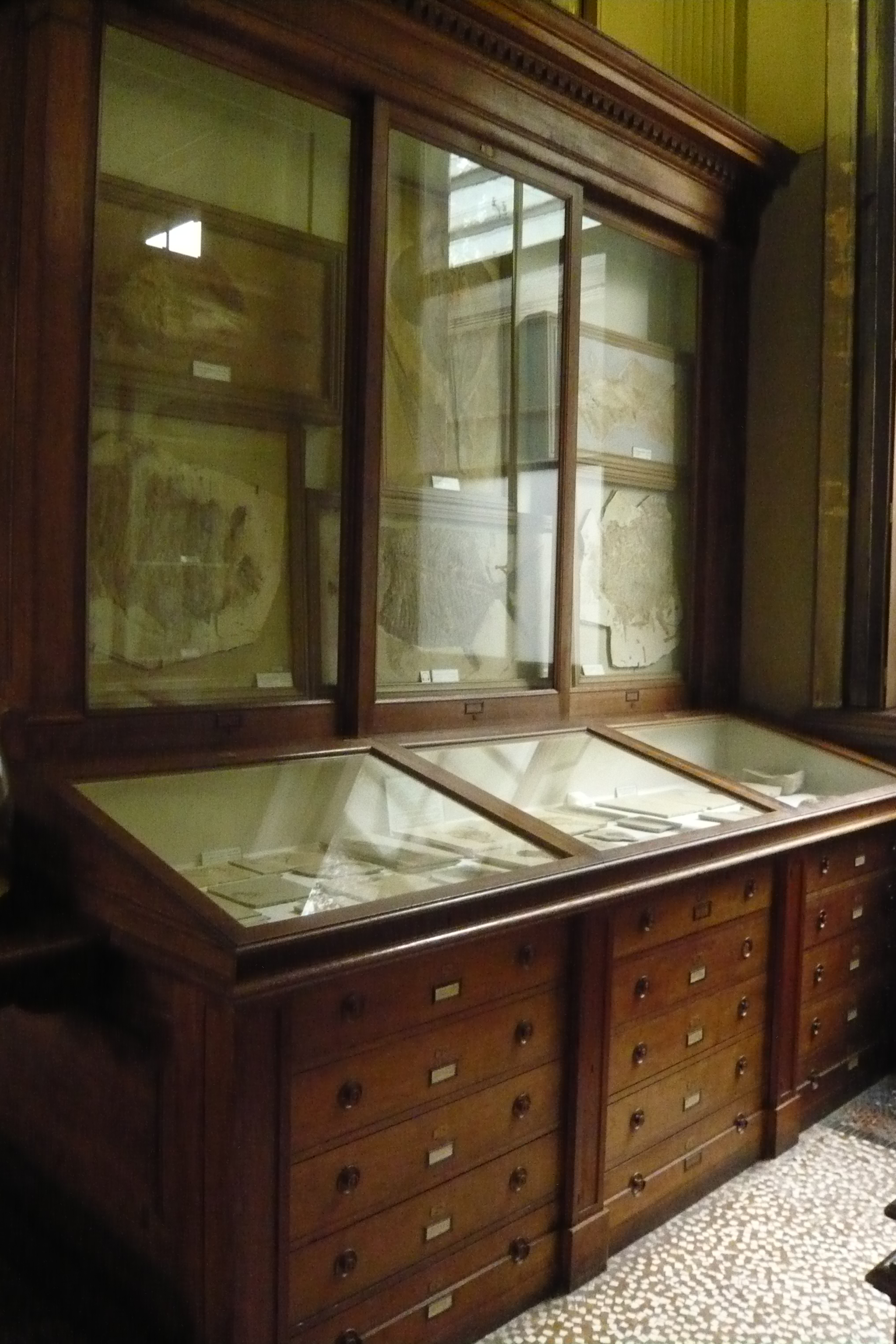
Cabinet 18

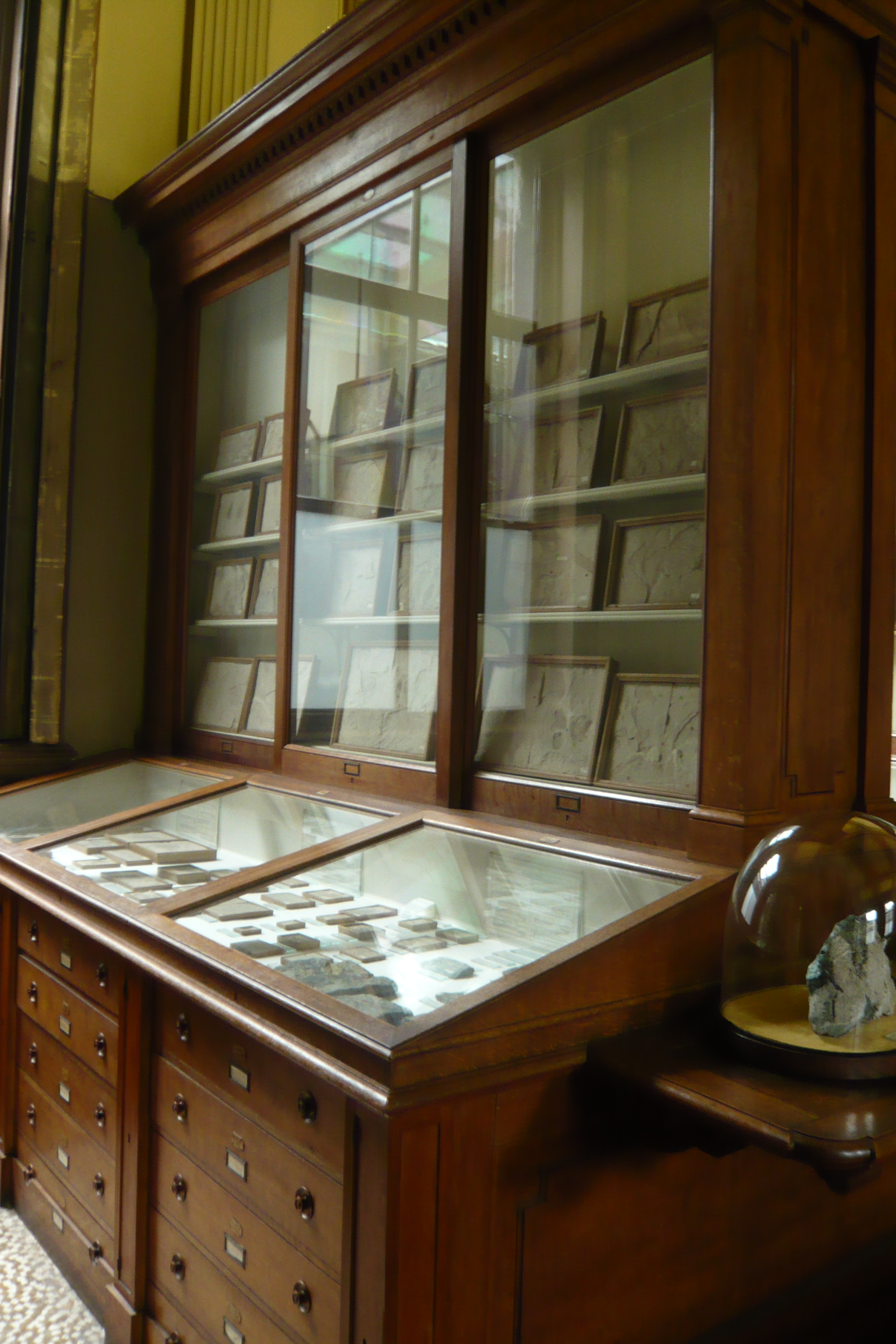
Cabinet 19

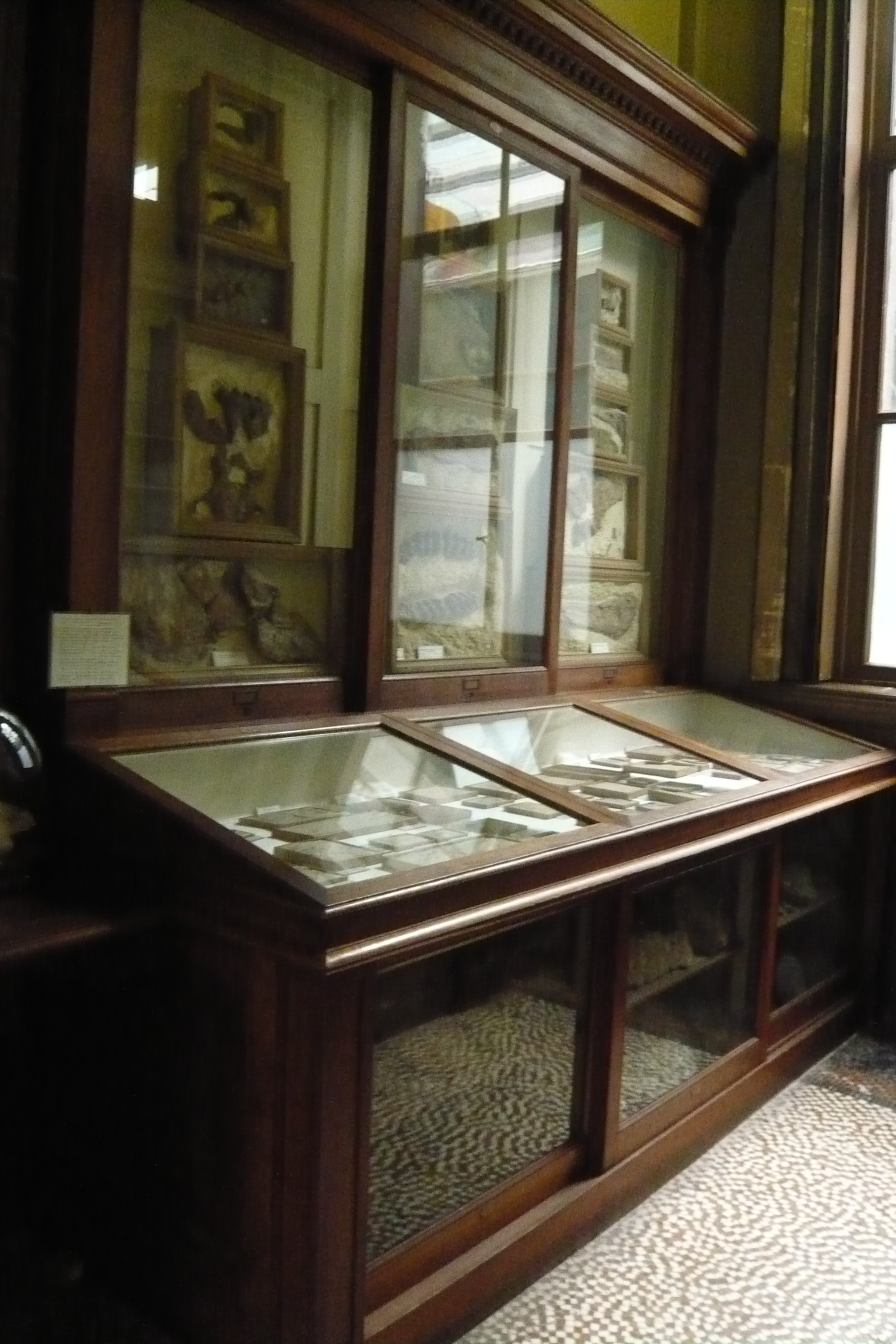
Cabinet 20 with Gomphotherium

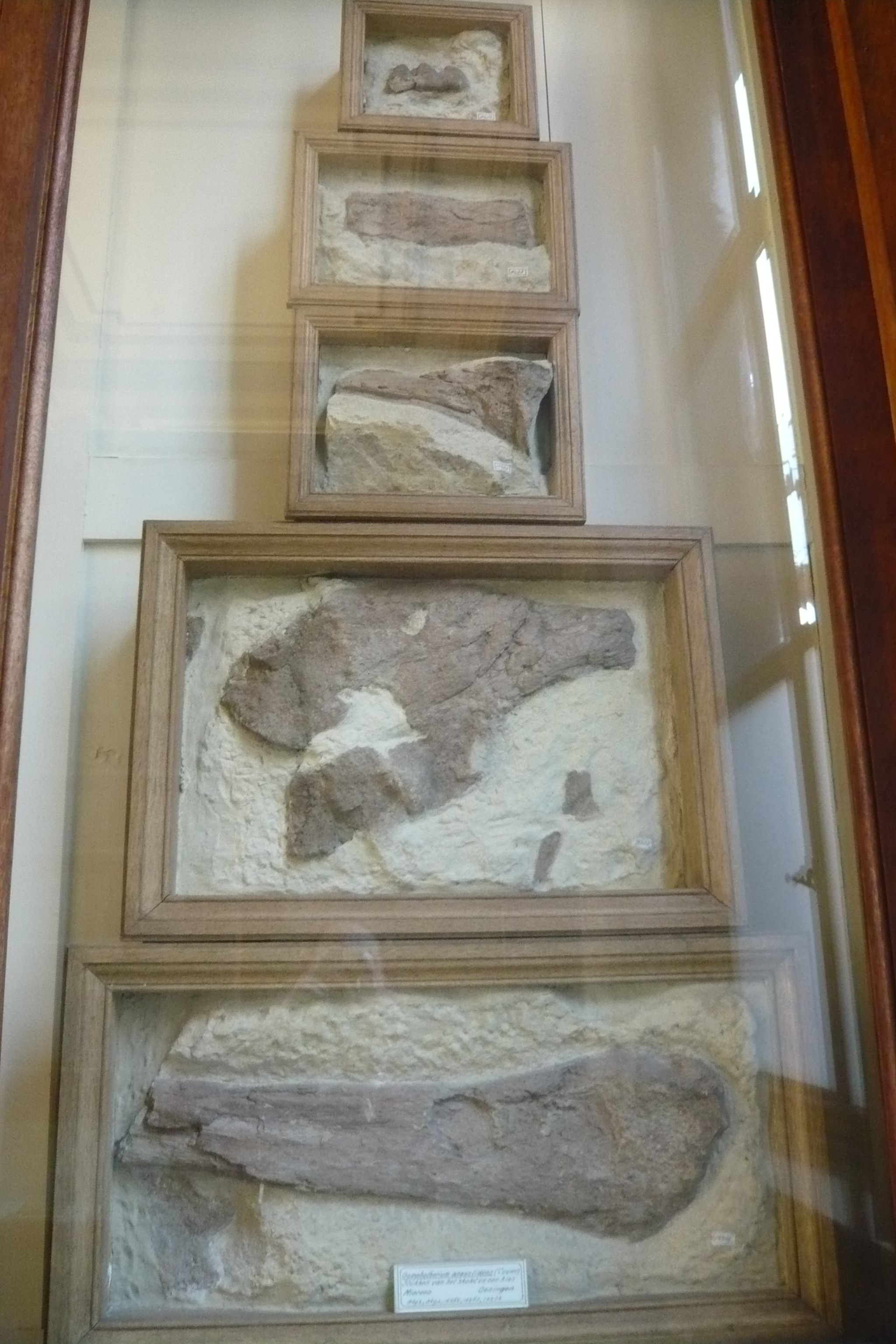
Gomphotherium, Mioceen, Oeningen - identified by Georges Cuvier

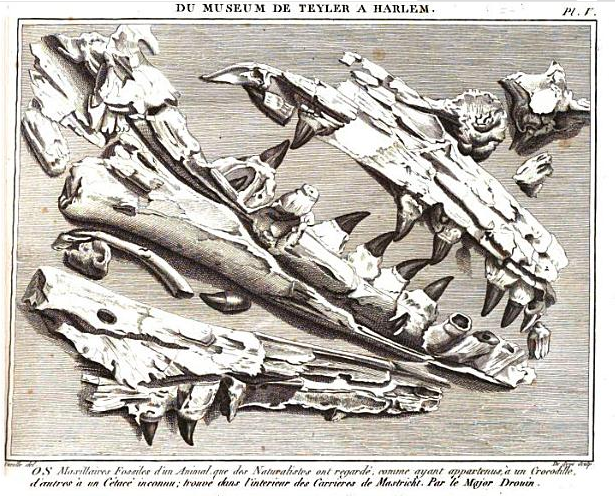
The Teylers mosasaurus as published by Faujas de Saint-Fond in 1799

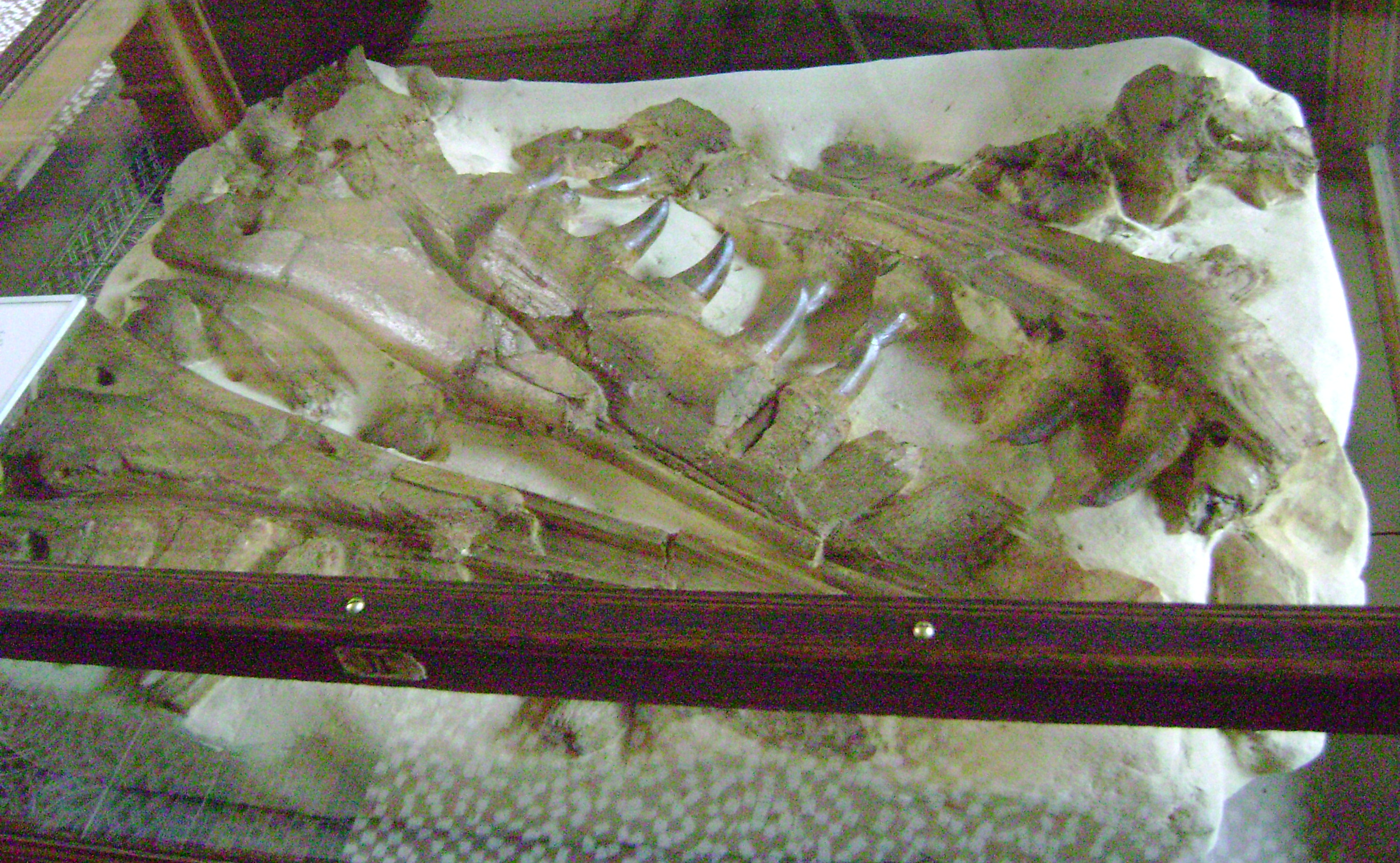
The Haarlem mosasaurus in its original cabinet

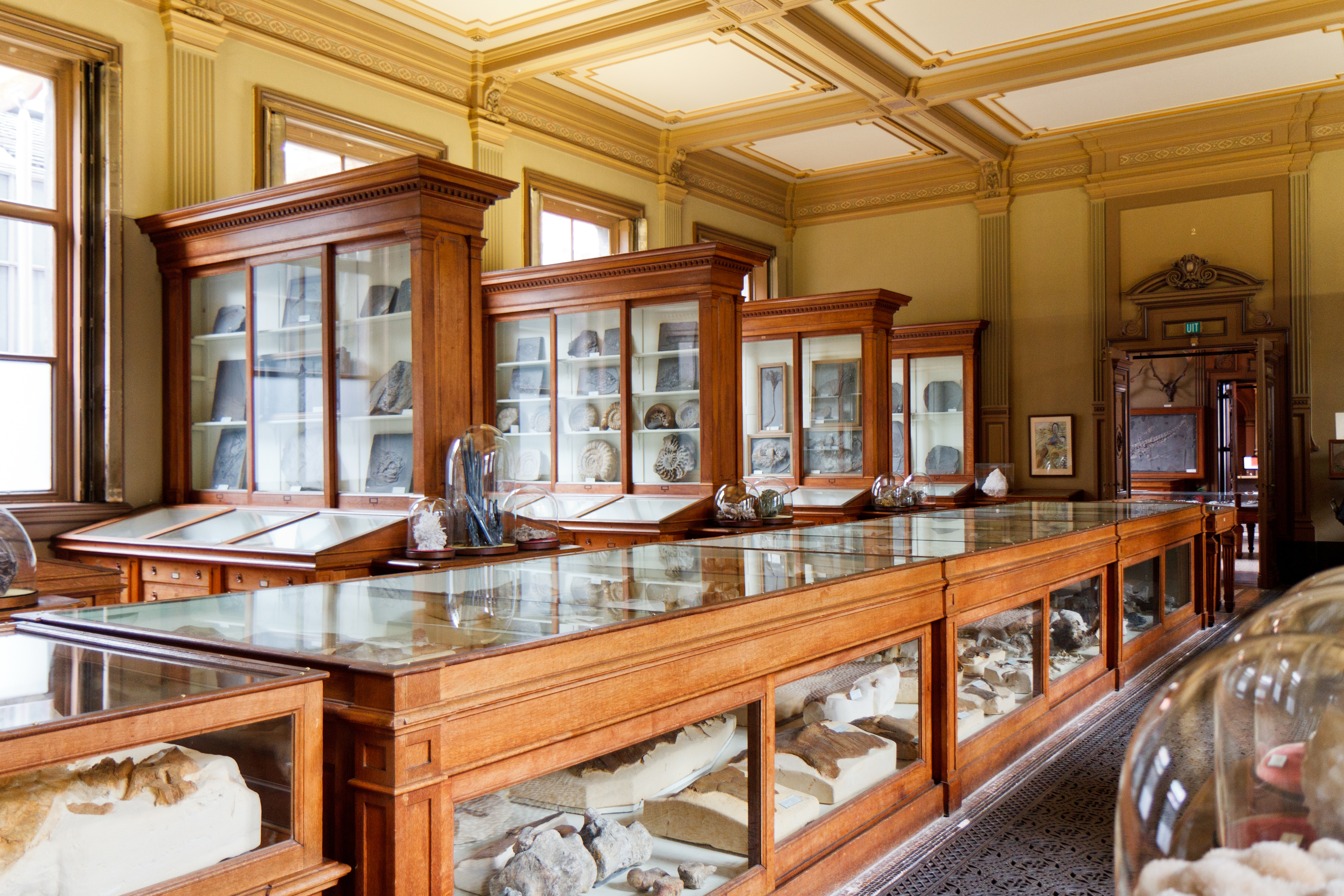
The central (low) cabinet houses the remains of the Petrus Camper collection, such as puppigerus
