= Jacob Gijsbertus Samuël van Breda =

Dutch biologist and geologist

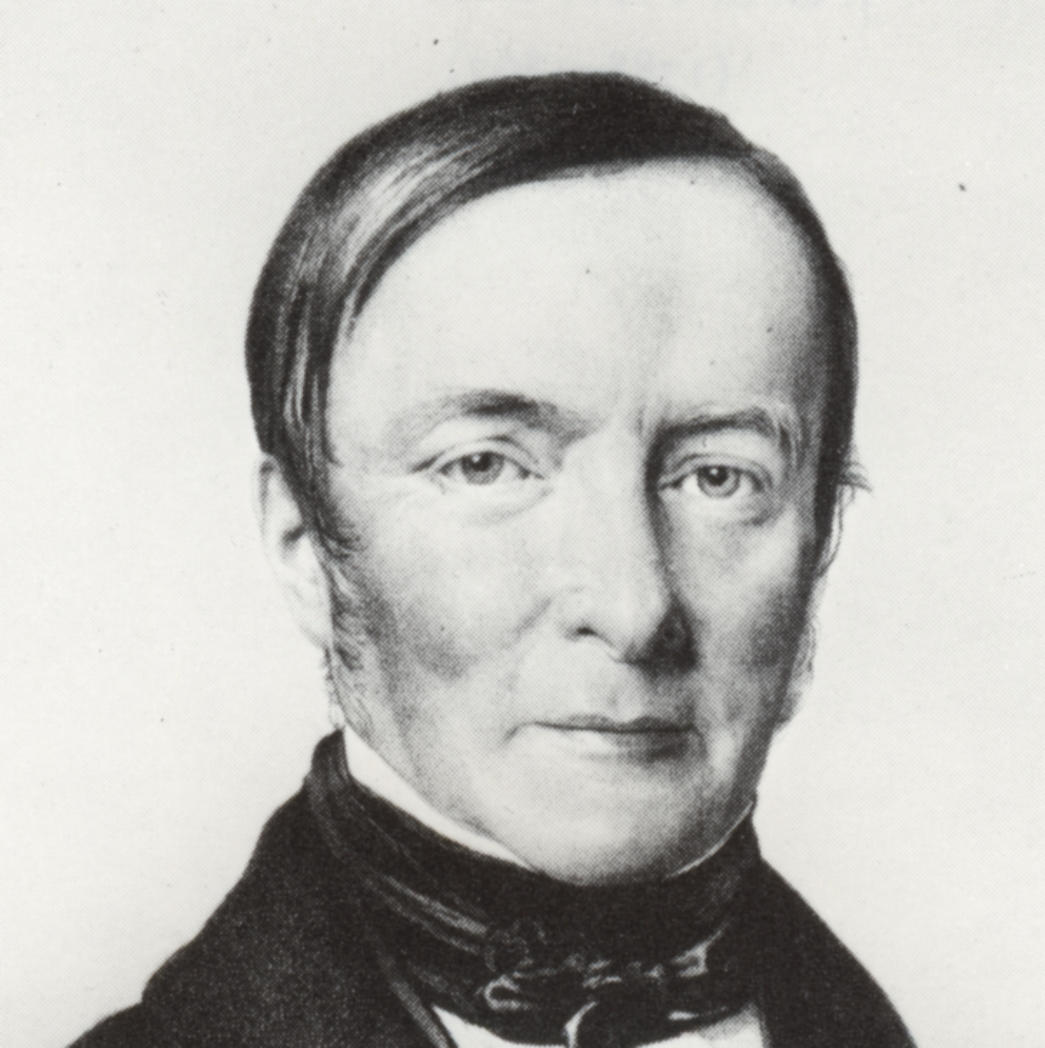
Jacob van Breda

Jacob Gijsbertus Samuël van Breda (24 October 1788, in Delft – 2 September 1867, in Haarlem) was a Dutch biologist and geologist.

Jacob was the son of Jacob van Breda, a Dutch physician, physicist and politician, and Anna Elsenera van Campen. His mother died when he was two years old. He studied medicine and physics at the University of Leyden, where he obtained his degree in medicine and philosophy in 1811, afterwards he travelled to Paris. In 1816 he became professor of botany, chemistry and pharmacy at the University of Franeker. In this period he benefitted from the newly peaceful conditions in Europe by visiting places of scientific interest to him, e.g. in Germany.

At Franeker he became close personal friends with one of the curators, the Dutch lawyer, administrator and politician Squire Adriaan Gillis Camper, himself the son of professor of anatomy Petrus Camper. On 9 May 1821 he married in Klein Lankum with Camper's third child and second daughter Frederika Theodora Ernestina Camper (1799-1834), who was herself an amateur-scientist who accompanied him on voyages to Georges Cuvier in France and Humphry Davy in England; she made drawings of his specimens. All children from their marriage would be stillborn.

In 1822, Van Breda became professor of botany, zoology and comparative anatomy at the University of Ghent. Here he was head of the local hortus botanicus and in 1825 commenced a major botanical work, the Genera et Species Orchidearum et Asclepiadearum, in fifteen tomes describing plant genera from the Dutch Indies shipped to him from Batavia; but he had to abandon this project and his position in 1830 because of the Belgian Revolution. In 1825 he had also written a biography of his deceased father-in-law: Levens-schets van Adriaan Gilles Camper.

In 1831 Van Breda became extraordinary professor of zoology and geology at Leyden. After his wife died on 15 April 1834, he remarried in 1836, to Cornelia Maria Veeren. They had two daughters, Jacoba Frederica and Maria Jacoba Petronella. In 1835 he became ordinary professor at Leyden. As a geologist, Van Breda was a follower of uniformitarianism. In 1839 he moved to Haarlem where he was appointed secretary of the Hollandsche Maatschappij der Wetenschappen (Hollandic Society of the Sciences) — in which capacity he launched over 400 essay competitions — and head of both the Palaeontological & Mineralogical and the Physics Cabinet of the Teylers Museum. In the latter function he researched in the field of magnetism and electricity and also bought many fossils, among them the Haarlem specimen of Archaeopteryx.

From 1852 to 1855 on orders of Thorbecke he was the president of a commission having to prepare the creation of the first comprehensive geological map of The Netherlands; from 1826 to 1830 he had already obtained some experience in this field when making a geological map of the Southern Netherlands (i.e. the later Belgium). The later project largely failed, however.

In 1857 he retired from his position at Leyden and in 1864 from his functions in Haarlem, dying from a stroke in 1867. His successor as curator of geology, paleontology and mineralogy at Teylers Museum was Tiberius Cornelis Winkler, who had produced the first Dutch translation of Darwin's Origin of Species in 1860.

Van Breda also had an extensive personal geological and paleontological collection, of about 1900 pieces, which in 1871 was sold to the University of Cambridge and the British Museum of Natural History; in 1883 one of the fossils was named in honour of Van Breda: Megalosaurus bredai, later made the type species of the dinosaur Betasuchus. Some archaeological items entered the collections of the British Museum.
