= Christian Ulrich =

Austrian-Hungarian architect (1836–1909)

- Born: Christian Ulrich; 27 April 1836; Vienna, Austria-Hungary
- Died: 22 January 1909; Vienna, Austria-Hungary
- Other name: Ulrich Keresztély
- Education: TU Wien, Vienna
- Occupation: Architect

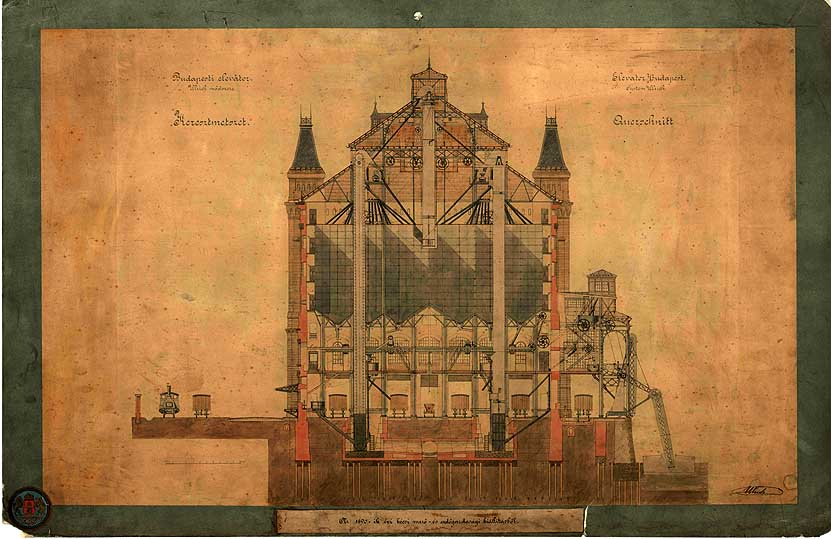
Section of the Budapest grain elevator, 1880

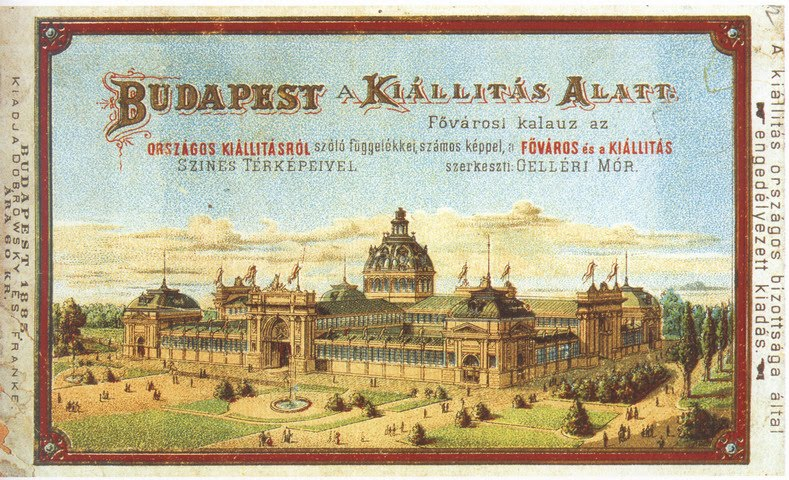
Palace of Industry from 1885

Christian Ulrich (27 April 1836 – 22 January 1909), was an Austrian-Hungarian architect.

Ulrich gained his reputation with the grain elevator in Budapest. In 1880, he won a contest for the elevator's design and in 1883 the building was completed. Later he moved to Budapest where he designed a factory (Iparcsarnok) in the city park, which was built in 1885. Both buildings were demolished shortly after World War II.

In 1879, Christian Ulrich designed a new facade and lobby for the Teyler's Museum in Haarlem (The Netherlands).
