= Teylers Museum =

Art, natural history, and science museum in Haarlem, Netherlands

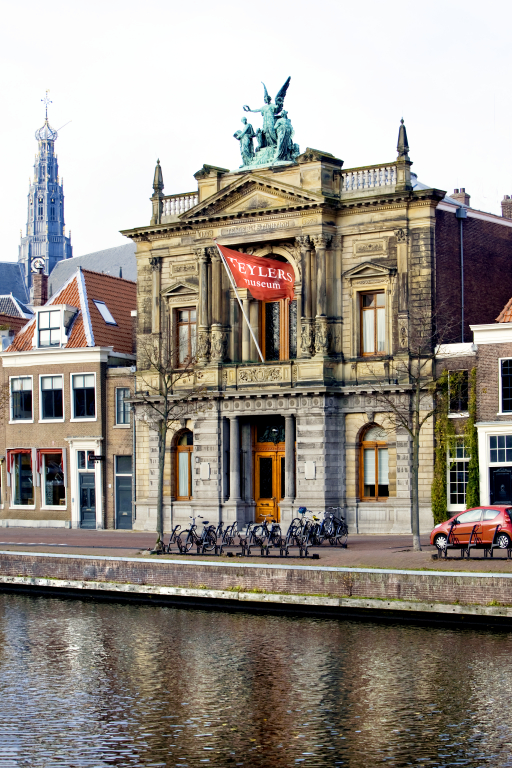
- Teylers Museum on the Spaarne in Haarlem

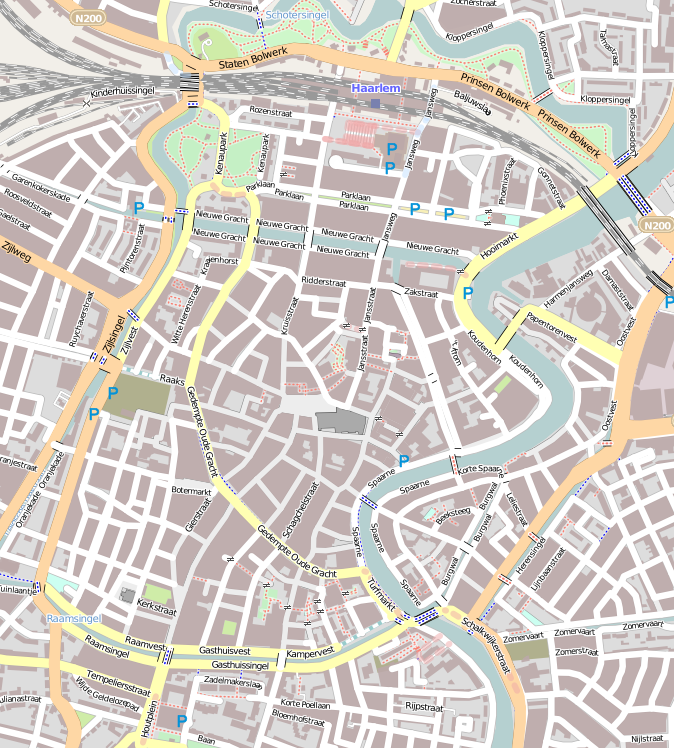
- Location of the museum in Haarlem
- Established: 1778
- Location: Spaarne 16; Haarlem, Netherlands
- Coordinates: 52.3804°N 4.6403°E
- Type: Art museum Natural history museum Science museum
- Collection size: 214,000 objects
- Visitors: 158,000 (2016)
- Director: Marc de Beyer
- Curator: Michiel Plomp
- Website: www.teylersmuseum.nl

Teylers Museum (Dutch pronunciation: [ˈtɛilərs myˈzeːjʏm]) is an art, natural history, and science museum in Haarlem, Netherlands. Established in 1778, Teylers Museum was founded as a centre for contemporary art and science. The historic centre of the museum is the neoclassical Oval Room (1784), which was built behind the house of Pieter Teyler van der Hulst (1702–1778), the so-called Fundatiehuis (Foundation House). Pieter Teyler was a wealthy cloth merchant and banker of Scottish descent, who bequeathed his fortune for the advancement of religion, art, and science. He was a Mennonite and follower of the Scottish Enlightenment.

== History ==
In his will, Pieter Teyler stipulated that his collection and part of his fortune should be used to establish a foundation for their promotion: Teylers Stichting. The Teyler legacy to the city of Haarlem was split into two societies: Teylers First or Theological Society (Dutch: Teylers Eerste of Godgeleerd Genootschap), intended for the study of religion and Teylers Second Society (Dutch: Teylers Tweede Genootschap), which was to concern itself with physics, poetry, history, drawing, and numismatics.

The executors of Teyler's will, the first directors of Teylers Stichting, decided to establish a centre for study and education. Under a single roof, it would house all manner of suitable artifacts, such as books, scientific instruments, drawings, fossils, and minerals. The concept was based on a revolutionary ideal derived from the Enlightenment: that people could discover the world independently, without coercion by church or state. The example that guided the founders in establishing Teylers Museum was the Mouseion of classical antiquity: a "temple for the muses of the arts and sciences" that could also serve as a meeting place for scholars and the venue for various collections.

== Oval Room ==
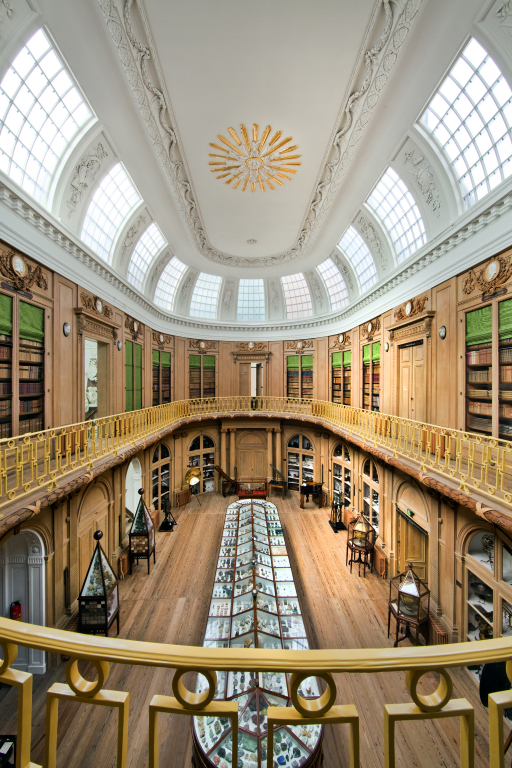
Oval Room (1784) in Teylers Museum

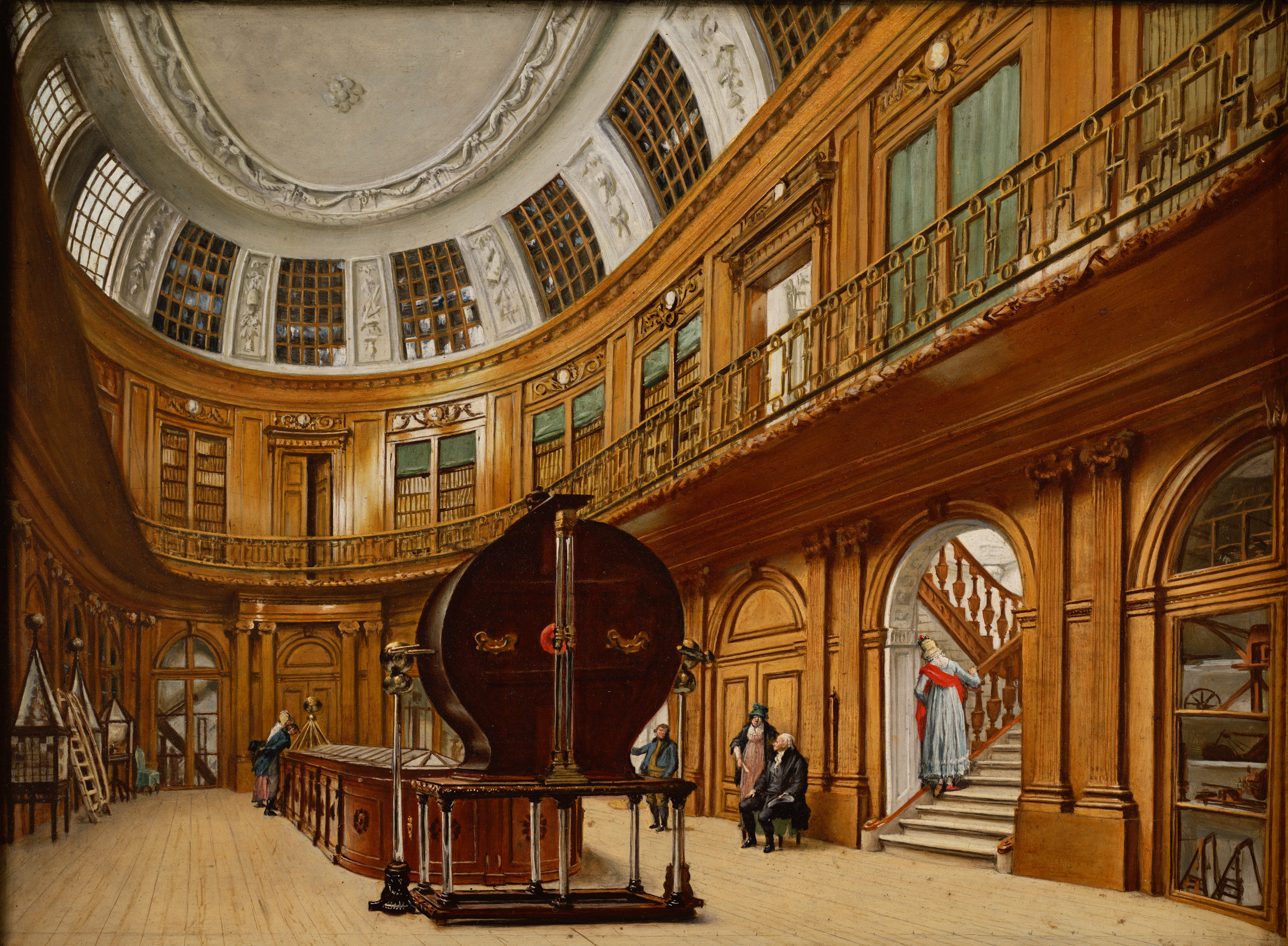
Painting by the museum art curator Wybrand Hendriks in 1800 of the famous Oval Room in Teylers Museum, showing the electrostatic generator of Martin van Marum

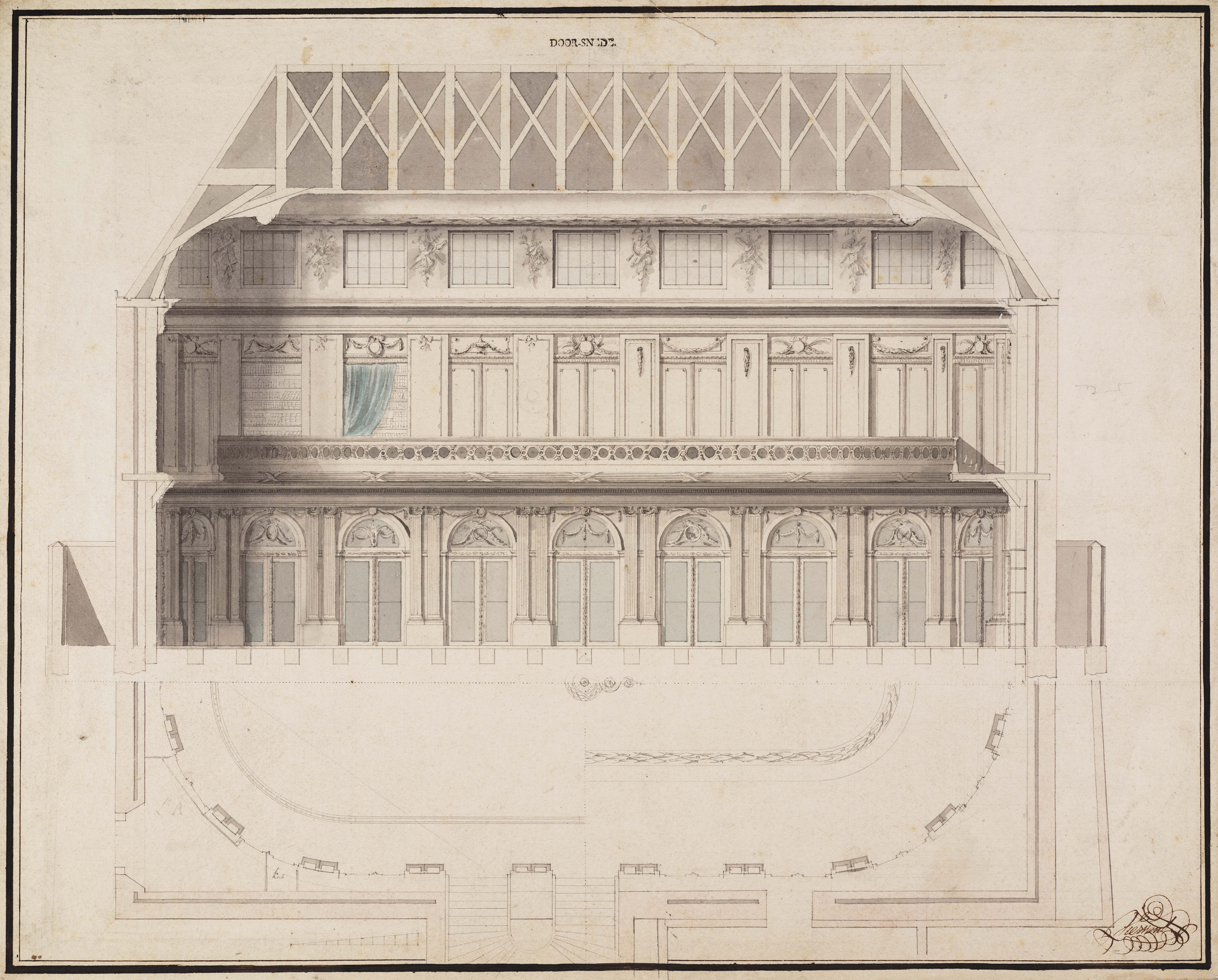
Leendert Viervant, design for the Oval Room of Teylers Museum

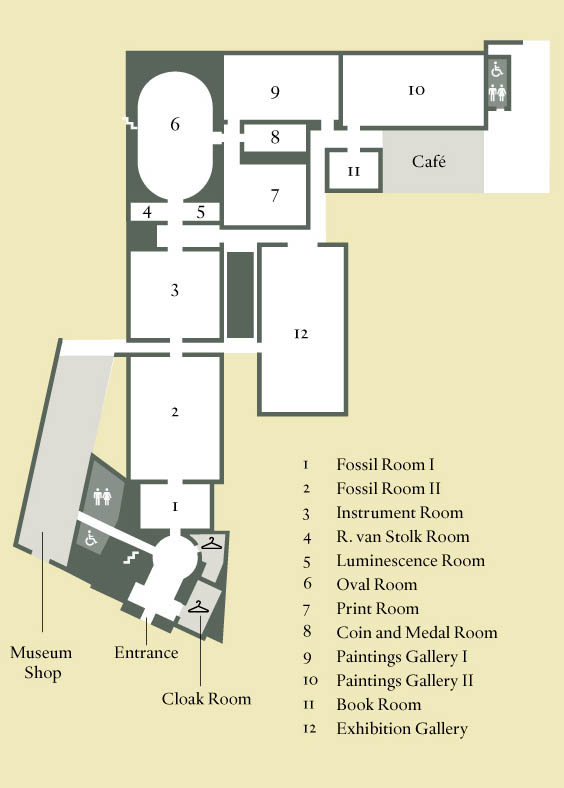
Map of Teylers Museum

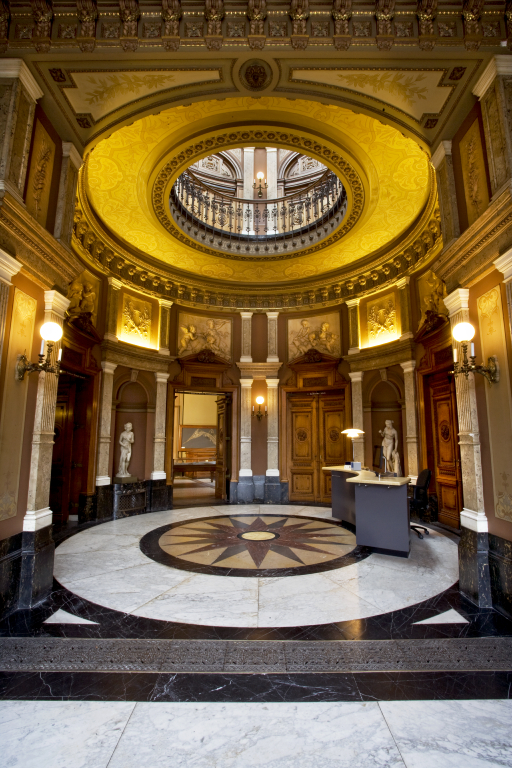
Entrance (1885)

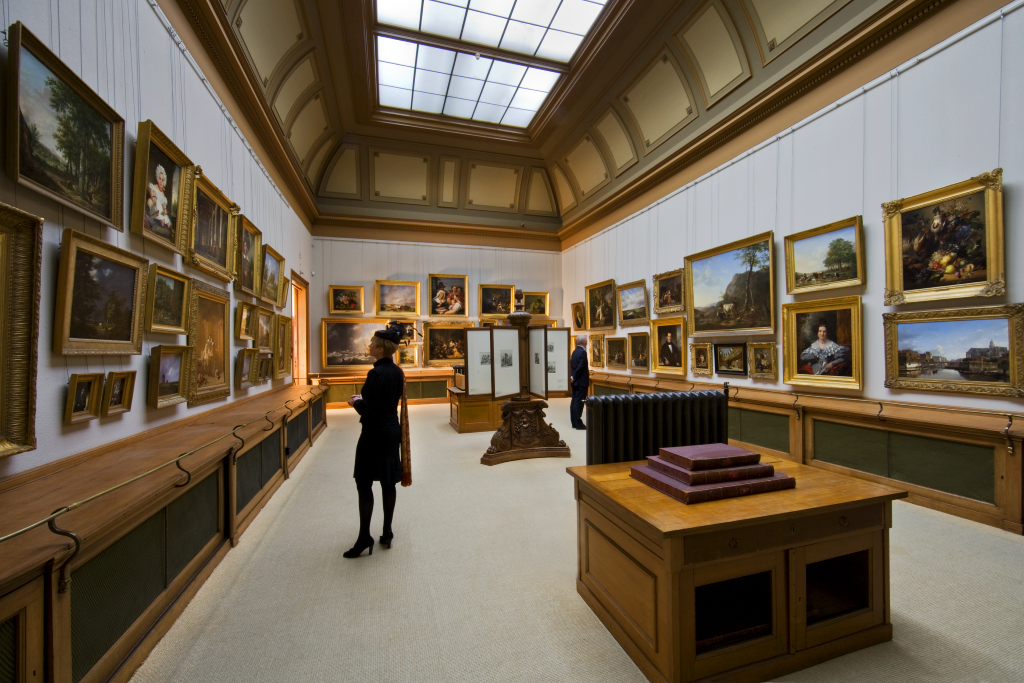
Paintings Gallery I (1838)

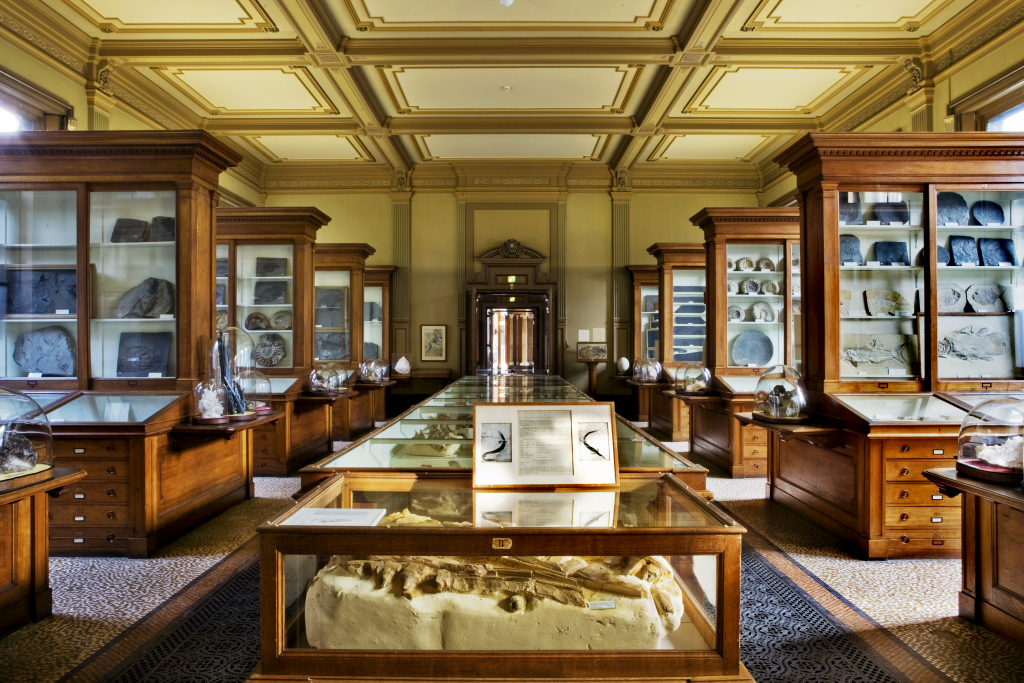
Fossil Room II (1885)

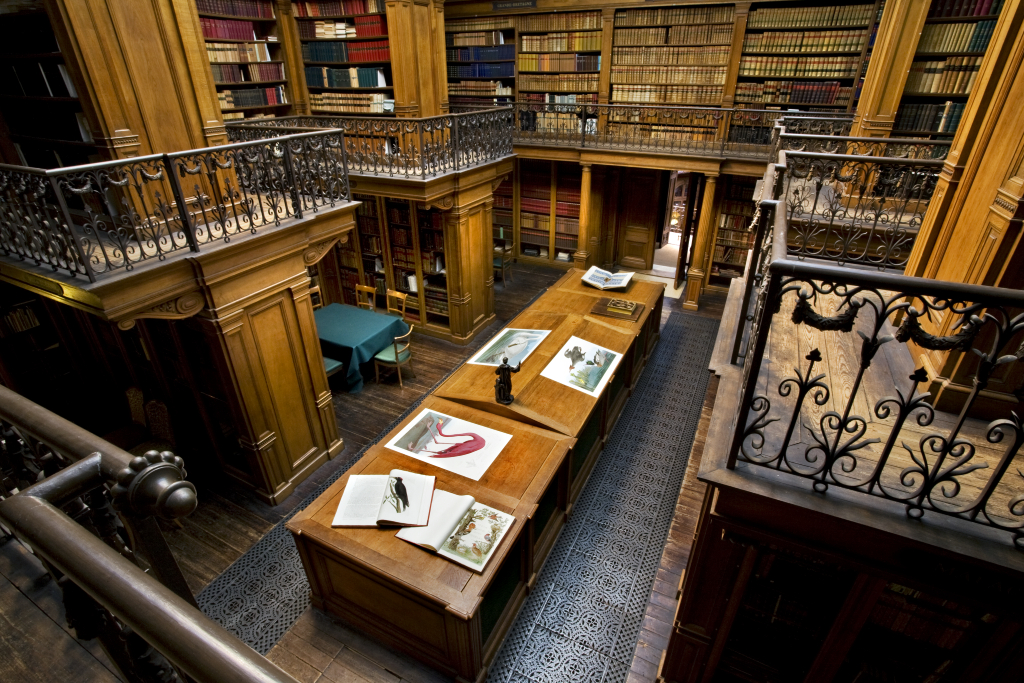
The Library of Teylers Museum (1885)

In 1779, Leendert Viervant started on the design of an "art and book room" behind Teyler's residence. This neoclassical room, whose shape quickly led it to be called the Oval Room, was designed for research and study; here, scientific experiments would be conducted, public demonstrations held, and books, drawings, and prints viewed by the public. The Oval room was opened in 1784, with the scientist Martin van Marum as its first director.

A showcase in the centre displays a mineralogical collection from the 18th century and the showcases around hold 18th-century scientific instruments. The upper gallery, which was designed to let in the maximum amount of light for viewing purposes, has 12 built-in bookcases, largely containing period encyclopaedias and periodicals.

== Extensions ==
Over the ensuing centuries, the museum was gradually extended. The arrangement of each new part was consistent with the insights of the day; thereafter it remained almost wholly unchanged. In the 19th century, the museum was expanded with a gallery for fossils ('Gaanderij der Versteeningen', in 1888 changed to the Numismatic Cabinet) and two painting galleries: Teylers First Painting Gallery in 1838 and Paintings Gallery II in 1892. In 1878, to mark the first centenary, a new entrance on the Spaarne (the current main entrance) was designed by the Viennese architect Christian Ulrich. It opened in 1885. The rooms behind it – the Instrument Room, and Fossil Room I and, behind it, Fossil Room II – were designed by the Haarlem architect A. van der Steur. At the same time, the library was extended and a 150-seat auditorium was added. Over a century later, in 1996, a large new wing was added; this was the design of Hubert-Jan Henket. In 2002, an adjoining property was added to the museum to serve as the museum shop and multimedia room.

== Collection ==
Teylers Museum holdings include fossils (some are the first ever discovered of Archaeopteryx), minerals, scientific instruments, medals, coins, and paintings.

The museum's first director, Martinus van Marum contributed to and used the facilities at Teylers Museum to research static electricity. To study fossils, he purchased fossil material such as the Mosasaurus. To demonstrate the principles of hydraulics, he commissioned models of mills and cranes. To disseminate natural and cultural knowledge, public experiments were conducted, such as those with van Marum's large electrostatic generator built in 1784 by John Cuthbertson in Amsterdam (the largest in the world). Lectures were given and scientific literature published.

The collection of Teylers Museum holdings include works by Michelangelo, Raphael, Guercino, and Claude Lorrain. The museum contains graphic work of Rembrandt and Adriaen van Ostade.

The Painting Galleries show a collection of works from the Dutch Romantic School and the later Hague and Amsterdam Schools, including major works by Barend Cornelis Koekkoek, Andreas Schelfhout, Cornelis Springer, Hendrik Willem Mesdag, Jan Willem Pieneman, Anton Mauve, Jacob Maris, Jan Hendrik Weissenbruch, George Hendrik Breitner, Jozef Israëls, and Isaac Israëls.

In 2007, the works of John James Audubon were displayed.

The original mission of the second society included research, as well as education. After the death of van Marum, Teylers continued to attract scientists of high standing as caretakers. The theoretical physicist and Nobel Prize winner Hendrik Lorentz was appointed Curator of Teylers Physics Cabinet in 1910, a position he held until his death in 1928. At the time of his appointment, Lorentz was at the height of his scientific career and was a central figure in the international community of physicists. Under his leadership, the Teylers Museum conducted scientific research in such diverse fields as optics, electromagnetism, radio waves, and atom physics. Lorentz was succeeded by the physicist and musician Adriaan Fokker. Physicist Wander Johannes de Haas served as conservator in the 1920s.

The museum's entire archives have also survived intact. They include the complete series of accounts for all acquisitions, extensions, salaries and day-to-day purchases since 1778, the complete series of visitors' books since 1789, and the minutes of all meetings of the museum board since 1778.

The museum is open six days a week; Tuesdays-Sundays 10:00–17:00.

== Heritage site ==
The museum is on the top 100 Dutch heritage sites list compiled by the Department for Conservation in 1990. It was nominated on 12 December 2011 by the Dutch Cabinet for UNESCO World Heritage Site status, based on its long history as a public knowledge institute and its continued efforts to preserve public access to its collections. However, the nomination was withdrawn in 2013.

== Administration ==
Since 1 January 2022, Marc de Beyer is the museum director. The former director is Marjan Scharloo. Terry van Druten is curator of the art collections of the museum, Trienke van der Spek is curator of the scientific collections, including fossils, minerals and the library.

The museum had 137,000 visitors in 2019.

Teylers Museum is a member of the Museumvereniging (Museum Association).

== See also ==
- Dutch Enlightenment – European cultural movement
- Highgrove Florilegium – Two-volume book of botanical illustrations
- Teylers Hofje – Hofje in Haarlem, Netherlands with 24 houses
- Gerrit Jan Michaëlis – Dutch painter
- Hendrik Jacobus Scholten – Dutch painter
- Vincent Jansz van der Vinne – Dutch painter
- Tiberius Cornelis Winkler – Dutch paleontologist (1822–1897)
