= Tiberius Cornelis Winkler =

Dutch paleontologist (1822–1897)

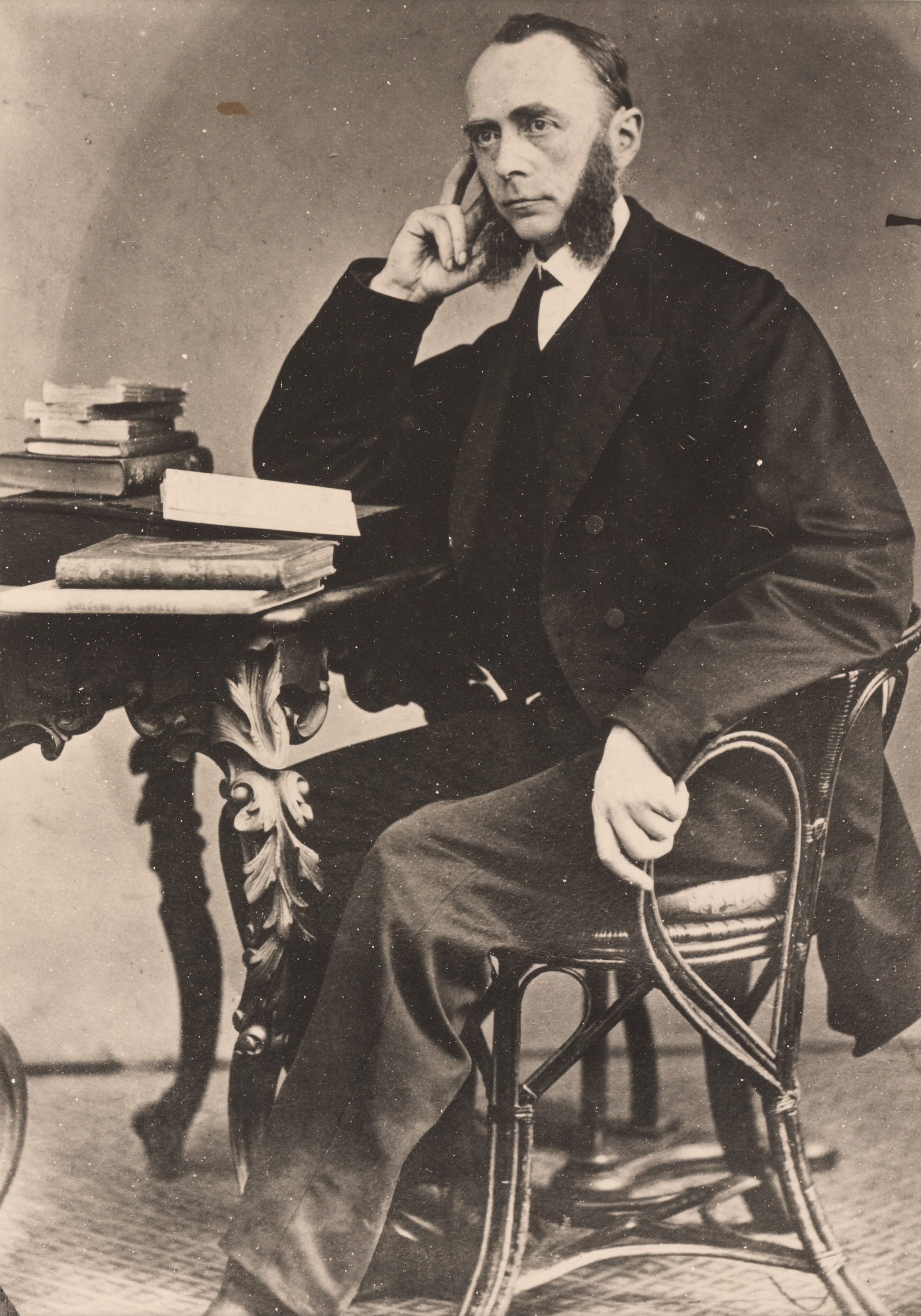
- Born: May 28, 1822; Leeuwarden, Netherlands
- Died: April 4, 1897 (aged 74); Haarlem, Netherlands
- Known for: Dutch translation of Darwin's Origin of Species (1860) popular science
- Scientific career
- Fields: Medicine, Paleontology, Zoology
- Workplaces: Teylers Museum

Tiberius Cornelis Winkler (May 28, 1822 – April 4, 1897) was a Dutch anatomist, zoologist and natural historian, and the second curator of geology, paleontology and mineralogy at Teylers Museum in Haarlem. In addition to translating the first Dutch edition of Charles Darwin's Origin of Species (1860), he published numerous works popularizing science, particularly in the life sciences.

== Early life ==
Winkler was born in 1822, in the Frisian capital of Leeuwarden. There, he attended primary school until his 12th or 13th year. His father subsequently arranged his apprenticeship to a grain merchant. He used his wages to educate himself in French, then German, and then English. This desire for self-education and self-discipline would characterise Winkler throughout his life.

He married in 1844 and began to study medicine in order to become a surgeon. In 1850, Winkler moved to Haarlem with his wife and four children, to begin his education at the local surgeons' college. He graduated two years later, and set up practice in Nieuwediep. His first patient, a fisherman, complained of being stung by a weever fish. His studies took him to the library of Teylers Museum in Haarlem, and his subsequent article on the weever in the popular journal Album der Natuur established him as an expert on fishes.

== At Teylers ==
At the Museum, he also developed an interest in paleontology and geology. The curator, professor Van Breda, approached him to describe the fossil fishes from his own and Teylers' collections. This set Winkler up at the museum and his work, well received, was published in the Verhandelingen ('Transactions') of Teylers' Society in 1859. This was followed up by further work on fishes from the German Solnhofen limestone, and completion of the catalogue of the museum's fossil fish collection.

This achievement so impressed the Museum's directors that they approached Winkler to do the same for their other fossil and mineral collections. A year later he finished the catalogue, despite being forced to work in an unheated room and continuing with his general medical practice. In 1864 Winkler was asked to become curator of Teylers' paleontological and mineralogical cabinet, a post he kept until his death in 1897.

He immediately set to work to catalogue the Museum's entire collection of fossils, which at the time was unnumbered and, frequently, undocumented. On the advice of the prominent Utrecht natural historian Pieter Harting, he applied a numerical system in which the fossils were divided into Periods (Paleozoic, Mesozoic and Caenozoic) and sorted from 'high' to 'low'. This system, and the way in which Winkler applied it, already showed the influence of Darwin's theory of evolution.

Completing this catalogue would take until 1896, by which time six volumes and five supplements had been published, documenting a total of 15,458 fossils. Winkler also catalogued the museum's mineral collection.

== Publications ==
Winkler was very active as a populariser of science. He wrote more than a hundred articles, many of them aimed at educating the general public, much as he had educated himself. Many of these works appeared in Album der Natuur ('Album of Nature') and the proceedings of the Dutch Literature society.

Equally significant, Winkler translated numerous scientific works into Dutch. Most famous among these was Charles Darwin's seminal Origin of Species, which appeared in Dutch one year after its English release in 1859. Winkler also proved himself to be a vocal defender of the theory of evolution, to the extent that he did not wish to question – unlike, at the time, Darwin himself – man's place in evolution.

Winkler was an active supporter of Volapük, a constructed language invented by the Catholic priest Johann Martin Schleyer.
