= 1612 in art =

Events from the year 1612 in art.

== Events ==
- (unknown)

== Paintings ==
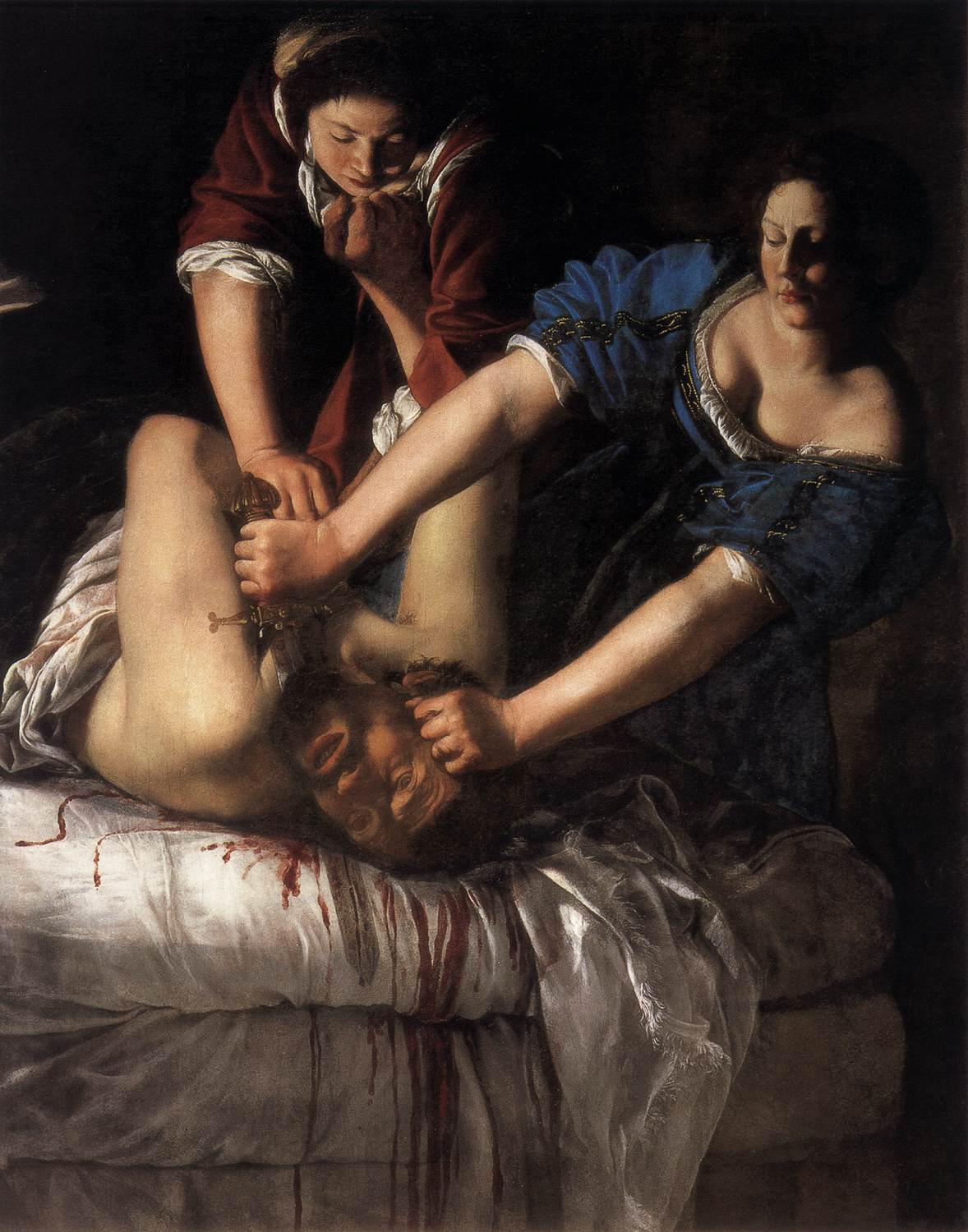
Gentileschi – Judith Beheading Holofernes

- Cornelis Engelsz – The St Adrian Civic Guard
- Artemisia Gentileschi - Judith Slaying Holofernes (first version (National Museum of Capodimonte, Naples); approximate date)
- Marcus Gheeraerts the Younger - Anne of Denmark in mourning (approximate date)
- Peter Paul Rubens
  - The Four Philosophers (1611-12)
  - The Massacre of the Innocents (first version; approximate date)
  - Saint Peter as Pope (1611-12)
- Joachim Wtewael - The Wedding of Peleus and Thetis

== Births ==
- February 9 - Pier Francesco Mola, Italian painter of frescoes (died 1666)
- April 12 - Simone Cantarini, Italian painter and etcher of the Bolognese School of painting (died 1648)
- August 2 - Saskia van Uylenburgh, Dutch wife and model of Rembrandt (died 1642)
- December 2 (baptized) - David Ryckaert III, Flemish painter, member of the Ryckaert family of artists (died 1661)
- date unknown
  - Michel Anguier, French sculptor (died 1686)
  - Barent Avercamp, Dutch painter (died 1679)
  - Baldassare Bianchi, Italian painter (died 1679)
  - Abraham Bosschaert, member of the Bosschaert family of still life painters (died 1643)
  - Kun Can, Chinese painter from Hunan who spent most of his life in Nanjing (died 1674)
  - Francisco de Burgos Mantilla, Spanish painter (died 1672)
  - Francesco Francanzano, Italian painter who participated in the Masaniello rebellion (died 1657)
  - Frans Wouters, Flemish Baroque painter (died 1659)
  - Zhou Lianggong, Chinese bureaucrat, poet, essayist and art historian (died 1672), patron of many important Chinese painters
- probable
  - Juan Bautista Martínez del Mazo, Spanish Baroque portrait and landscape painter (died 1667)
  - Harmen Steenwijck, Dutch painter of still lifes, notably of fruit (died 1656)
  - Andries Both, Dutch genre painter (died 1642)

== Deaths ==
- March - Philip Galle, publisher of old master prints (born 1537)
- May 31 - Willem Isaacsz Swanenburg, Dutch engraver (born 1580)
- August 17 - Alexander Colyn, Flemish sculptor (born 1527/1529)
- October 4 - Cesare Aretusi, Italian painter primarily of portraits (born 1580)
- October 10 - Bernardino Poccetti, Italian Mannerist painter (born 1548)
- date unknown
  - Federico Barocci, Italian Renaissance painter and printmaker (born 1526)
  - Giovanni Bizzelli, Italian painter (born 1556)
  - Francesco Cavazzoni, Italian painter and art historian (born 1559)
  - Pieter Claeissens the Younger, Flemish painter (date of birth unknown)
  - Nicolas Cordier, French sculptor, painter and printmaker (born 1567)
  - Dominicus Custos, Flemish printer and copperplate engraver (born 1560)
  - Aert Pietersz, Dutch painter (born 1550)
  - Giovanni Battista Trotti, Italian painter active mainly in his native city of Cremona (born 1555)
