= Aretusi =

Aretusi is a surname. Notable people with the surname include:

- Alessandro Aretusi, 17th century Italian painter
- Cesare Aretusi (1549–1612), Italian painter
- Pellegrino Aretusi (c. 1460–1523), Italian painter
