= 1559 in art =

Events from the year 1559 in art.

== Events ==
- Francesco Primaticcio and his assistants complete painting the Salle d'Hercule at the Palace of Fontainebleau (begun in the 1530s).
- Sidsel Ulfstand and others complete the tapestry in the great hall of the Danish royal palace.

== Works ==
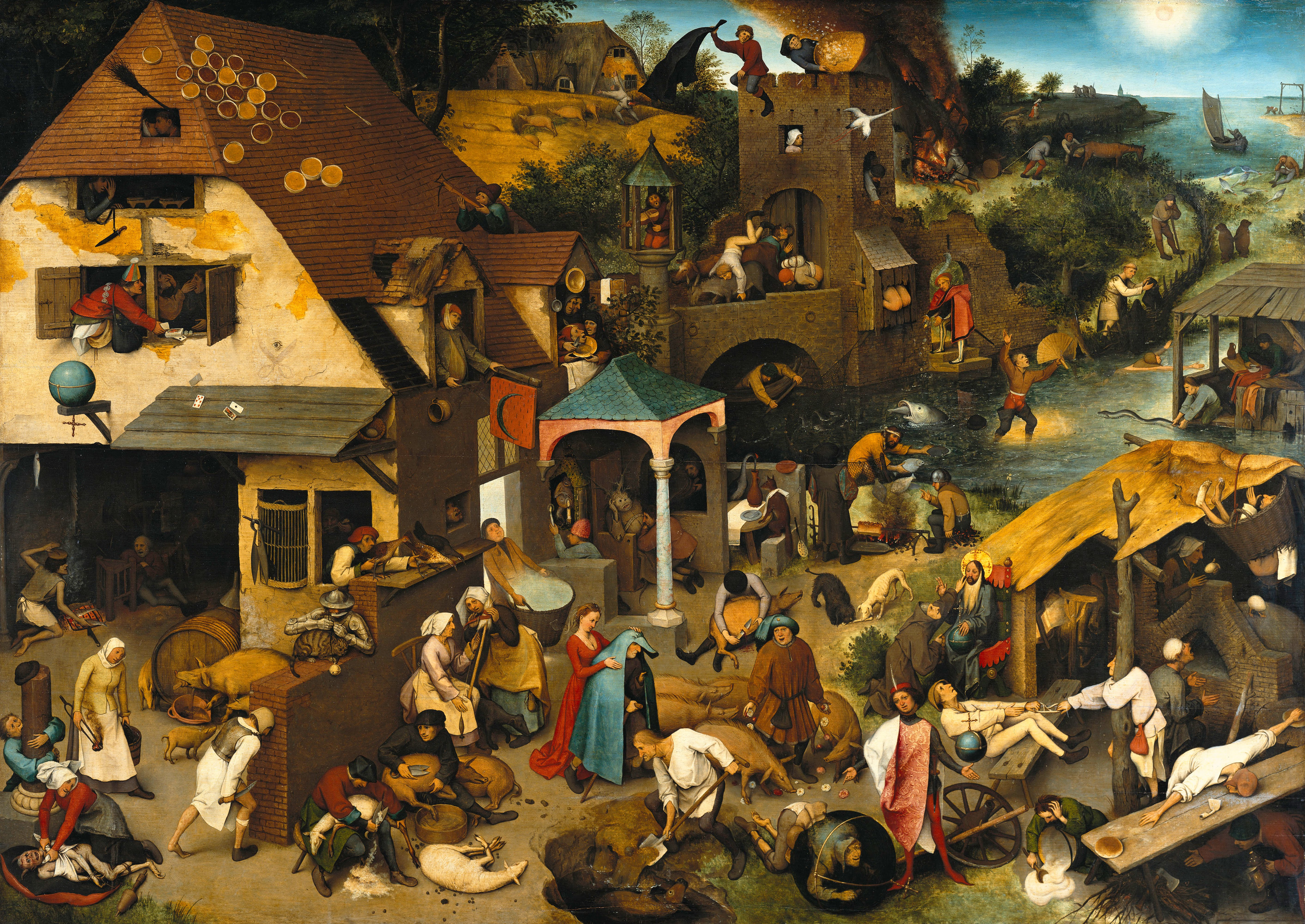
Bruegel, Netherlandish Proverbs

- Pieter Bruegel the Elder
  - The Fight Between Carnival and Lent
  - Netherlandish Proverbs
- Luca Cambiaso – Resurrected Christ
- Titian
  - The Entombment
  - St Margaret and the Dragon

== Births ==
- January 26 - Francesco Bassano the Younger, painter (died 1592)
- September 12 - Cigoli, Italian painter and architect of the late Mannerist period (died 1613)
- date unknown
  - Francesco Cavazzoni, Italian painter and art historian (died 1612)
  - Orazio Farinati, Italian Mannerist painter (died 1616)
  - Domenico Passignano, Italian painter of a late-Renaissance or Counter-Maniera (Counter-Mannerism) style (died 1636)
  - Kanō Sanraku, Japanese painter (died 1635)
- probable
  - Jan Vermeyen, Dutch goldsmith of the Renaissance Mannerism (died 1606)

== Deaths ==
- September 6 - Benvenuto Tisi (Il Garofalo), late-RenaissanceMannerist Italian painter of the School of Ferrara (born 1481)
- November 5 - Kanō Motonobu, Japanese painter (born 1476)
- date unknown
  - Giovanni da Nola, Italian sculptor and architect (born 1478)
  - Nicolas Denisot, French Renaissance poet and painter (born 1515)
  - Jan Cornelisz Vermeyen, Dutch Northern Renaissance painter (born 1500)
  - Wen Zhengming, Ming Dynasty painter, calligrapher, and scholar (born 1470)
- probable - Juste de Juste, Franco-Italian sculptor and printmaker in etching (born 1505)
