= Giovanni Battista Fiorini =

Italian painter

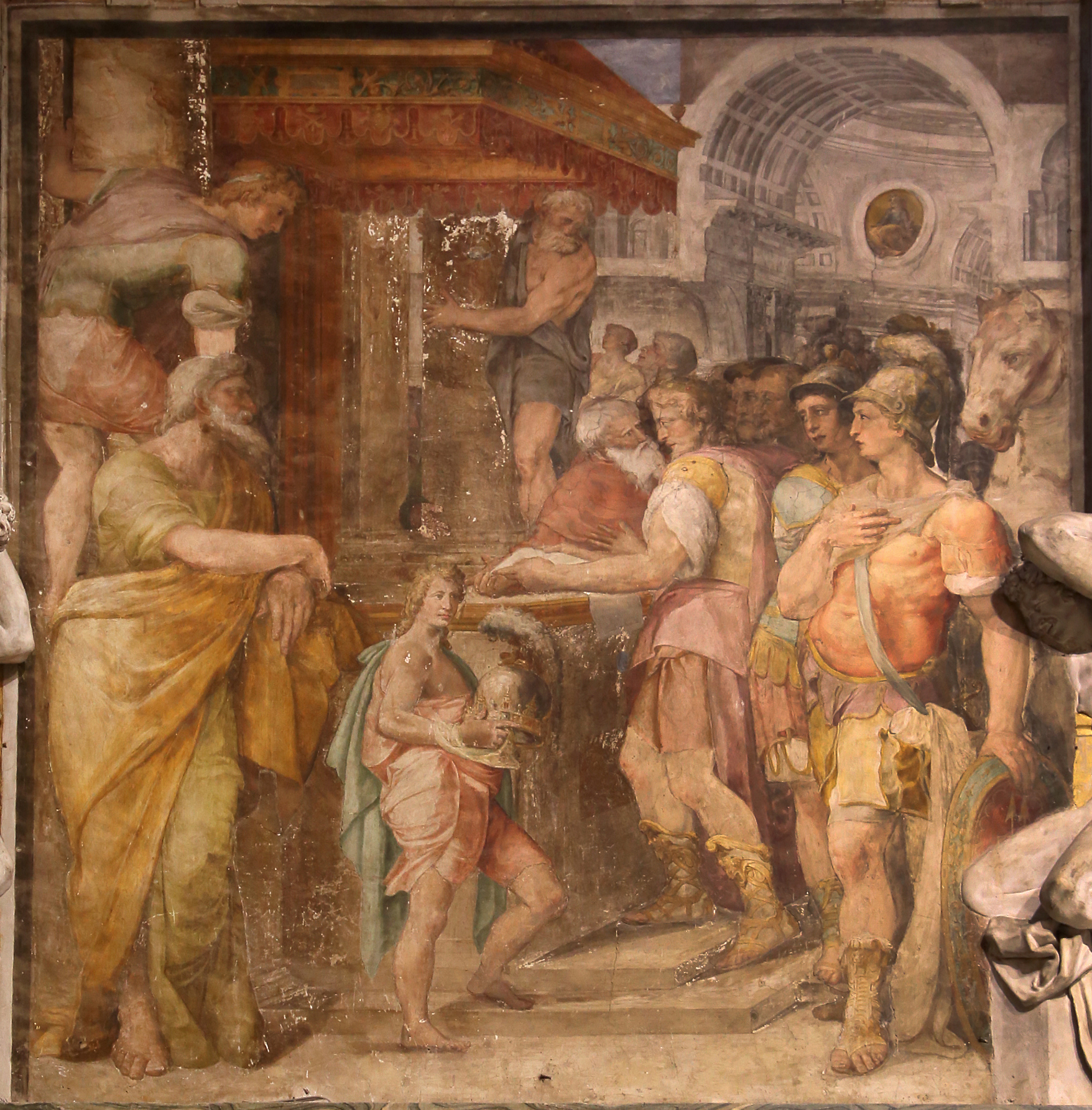
Fresco in the Sala Regia

Giovanni Battista Fiorini was an Italian painter of the late Renaissance period.

He was a native of Bologna. He was active at the close of the 16th century, and died after 1595. He is chiefly known as a coadjutor of Cesare Aretusi, with whom he painted several pictures at Bologna and Brescia, and distinguished himself especially as a good designer. Among his works:

- Christ Giving the Keys to St. Peter, Bologna Cathedral.
- Birth of the Virgin, San Giovanni in Monte, Bologna.
- Descent from the Cross, San Benedetto, Bologna.
- Mass of St Gregory, Padri Servi, Bologna.
- Birth of the Virgin, Sant'Afra, Brescia.
- Fresco by Fiorini alone, Sala Regia, Vatican.
