= San Giovanni in Monte =

Church building in Bologna, Italy

Coordinates: 44.4906°N 11.3486°E

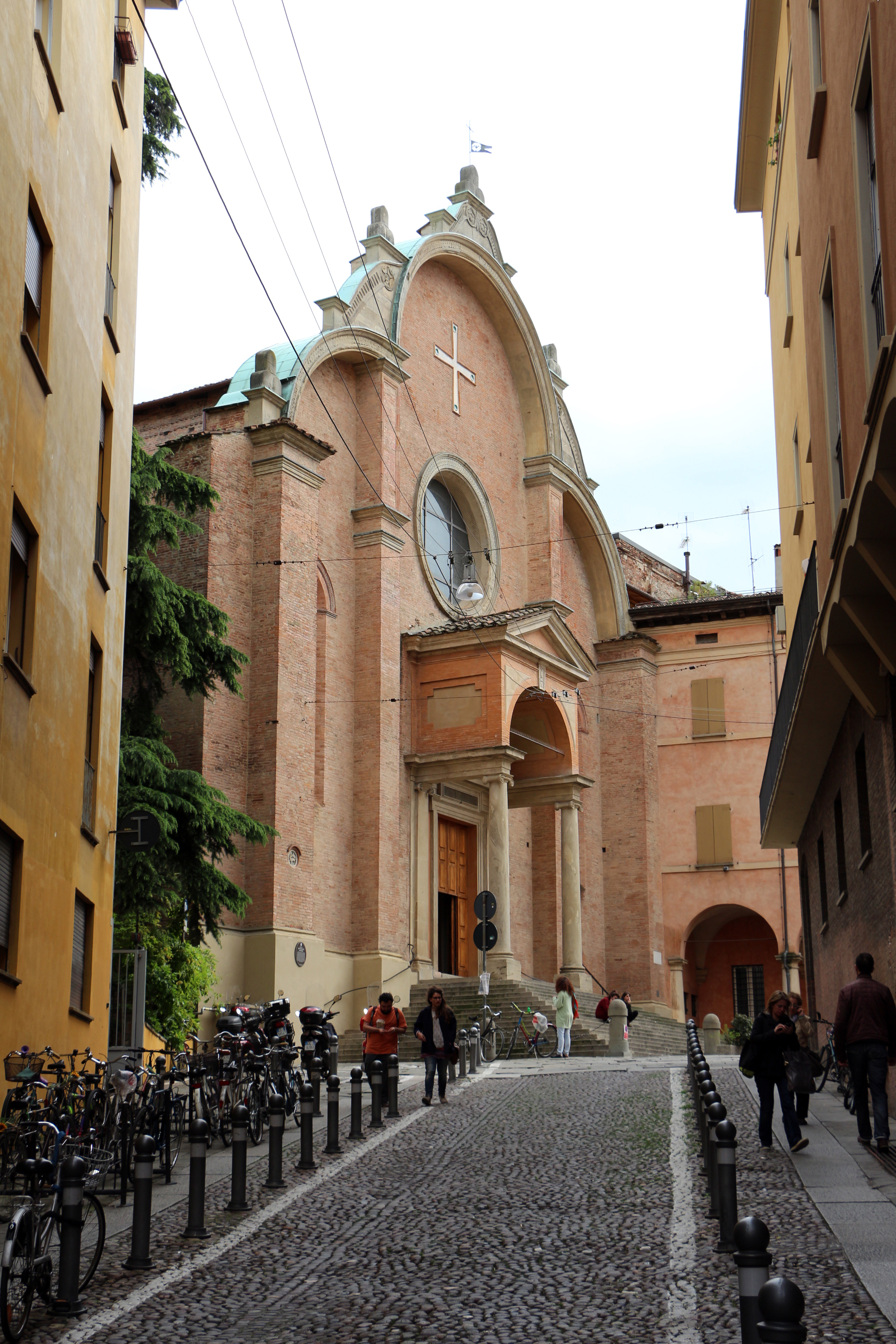
Facade as seen from a side street

San Giovanni in Monte is a 15th-century Roman Catholic church in Bologna, Italy.

== History ==
The current church can be traced back to a round church from the 5th century known as the Monte Oliveto, traditionally said to be founded by Saint Petronius in 433. The first written mention of the church dates from 1045. In or before 1118, the Canons Regular of the Lateran established a community here, which first restored and enlarged the old church (between ca. 1200 and ca. 1300) and replaced it with a new, late Gothic church (ca. 1450), with a 1474 facade in Renaissance style. The vault was finally finished in 1603. The bell tower is over 40m high. It was finished in the 14th century, with a base dating back to the 13th century.

The canons regular were expelled after Napoleon invaded Italy, and some of the artworks from the church were moved to the Louvre. After the defeat of Napoleon, most of the artworks returned, but some were moved to Italian museums instead. In 1824, the floor of the church was replaced; the tombstones that were placed until then in the floor were moved to the walls at that time.

On 29 January 1944, the church was badly damaged after a bombing raid, with three chapels destroyed and considerable damage to the portico, the vault, and other chapels. The church was restored between 1947 and 1950.

== Artworks ==
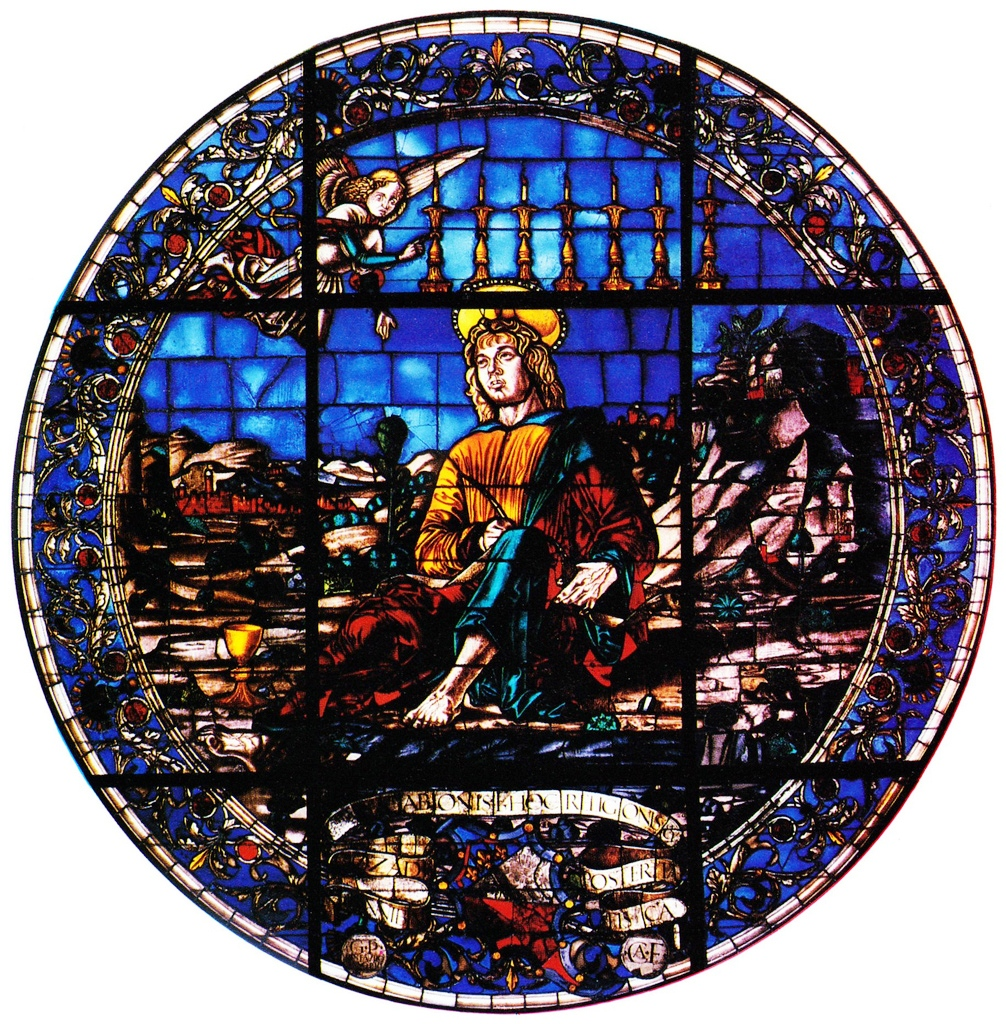
St. John of Patmos, stained glass window from ca. 1480, in the oculus in the facade of the San Giovanni

The portico has a large sculpture of an eagle (the symbol of John the Evangelist, patron saint of the church) by Niccolò dell'Arca (ca. 1481).

The altar is Pre-Romanesque and Romanesque, with the octagonal columns and the cross dating back to the 11th century and earlier. The Christ on the cross is a 16th-century wooden sculpture.

The interior had work by Cima da Conegliano, the Madonna of the Rosary by Domenichino, the Madonna with St. Michael and three other Saints by Pietro Perugino, and The Ecstasy of St. Cecilia by Raphael (the original was commissioned for the San Giovanni in 1513). These pictures were removed during Napoleonic times and can now be found in the Pinacoteca Nazionale di Bologna.

In the "Cappella Maggiore" or Major Chapel are a painting by father Petronius Fancelli and son Pietro Fancelli, a crucifix by Jacopino da Bologna from 1361, a painting by Cesare Aretusi and Giovanni Battista Fiorini, and a choir with 53 seats, carved by Paolo Sacca, an artist from Cremona, between 1518 and 1523. Until 1752, it housed a Predella polyptych by Ercole de' Roberti, parts of which are now in Dresden and parts in Liverpool. The sacristy has as altar piece a Saint Patrick by Vincenzo Spisanelli and paintings by Felice Torelli, Ercole Graziani the Younger, Ubaldo Gandolfi and Prospero Fontana.

In the chapels around the church are further paintings by mainly Bolognese artists like Lorenzo Costa, Ercole Procaccini the Elder, Giacomo Francia, Bartolomeo Cesi, Benedetto Gennari, Orazio Samacchini, Alessandro Tiarini, Francesco del Cossa, Giovanni Battista Bolognini, Luca Longhi and Pietro Faccini, further works by Spisanelli, 15th-century frescoes by Giovanni da Modena, and a 15th-century Pietà. Chapel XVI contains a Saint Francis of Assisi by Guercino from 1645.

Other works of art include the 15th-century stained glass windows designed by Lorenzo Costa and Francesco del Cossa, an altar-piece from the 14th century, and frescoes by the brothers Giulio and Giacomo Raibolini, which were only rediscovered in 1894.

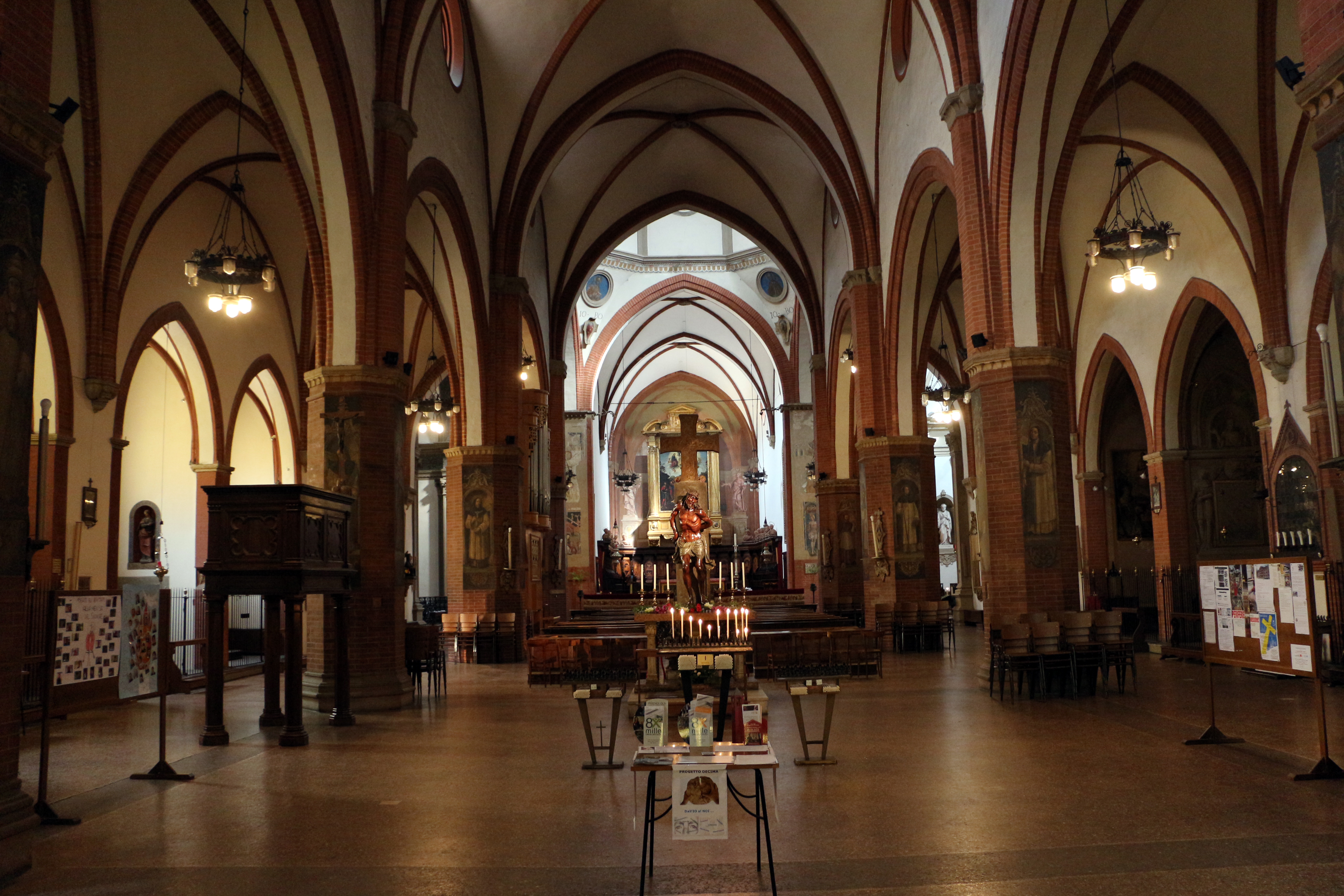
Interior of the church

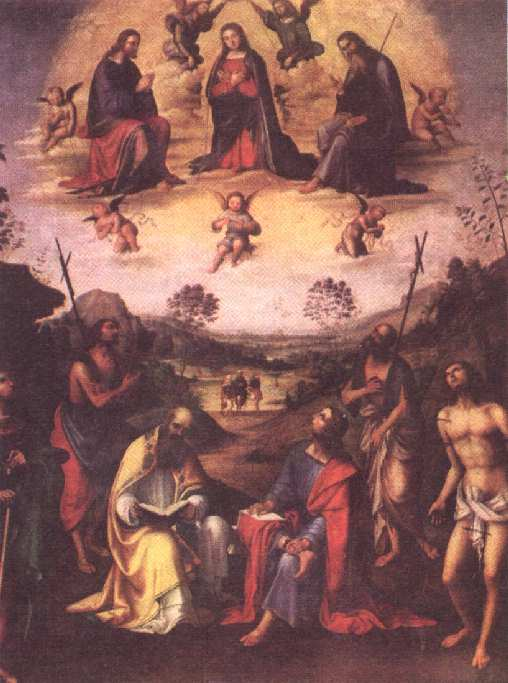
Crowning of the Madonna and Saints by Lorenzo Costa, 1501

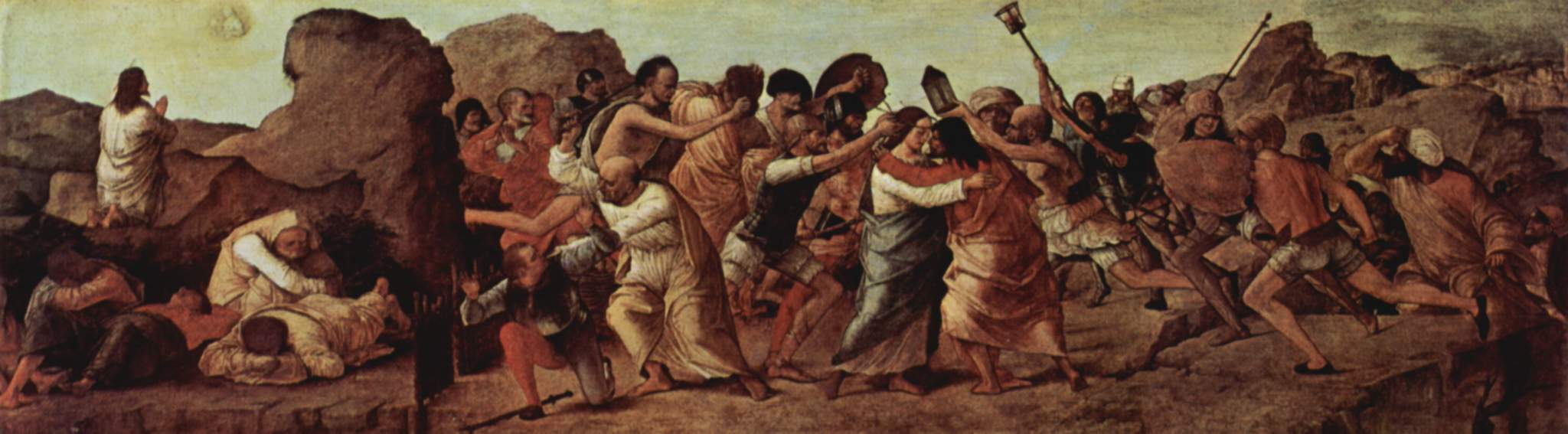
Detail of the Predella by Ercole de' Roberti, originally in the San Giovanni in Monte but now in the Gemäldegalerie Alte Meister in Dresden

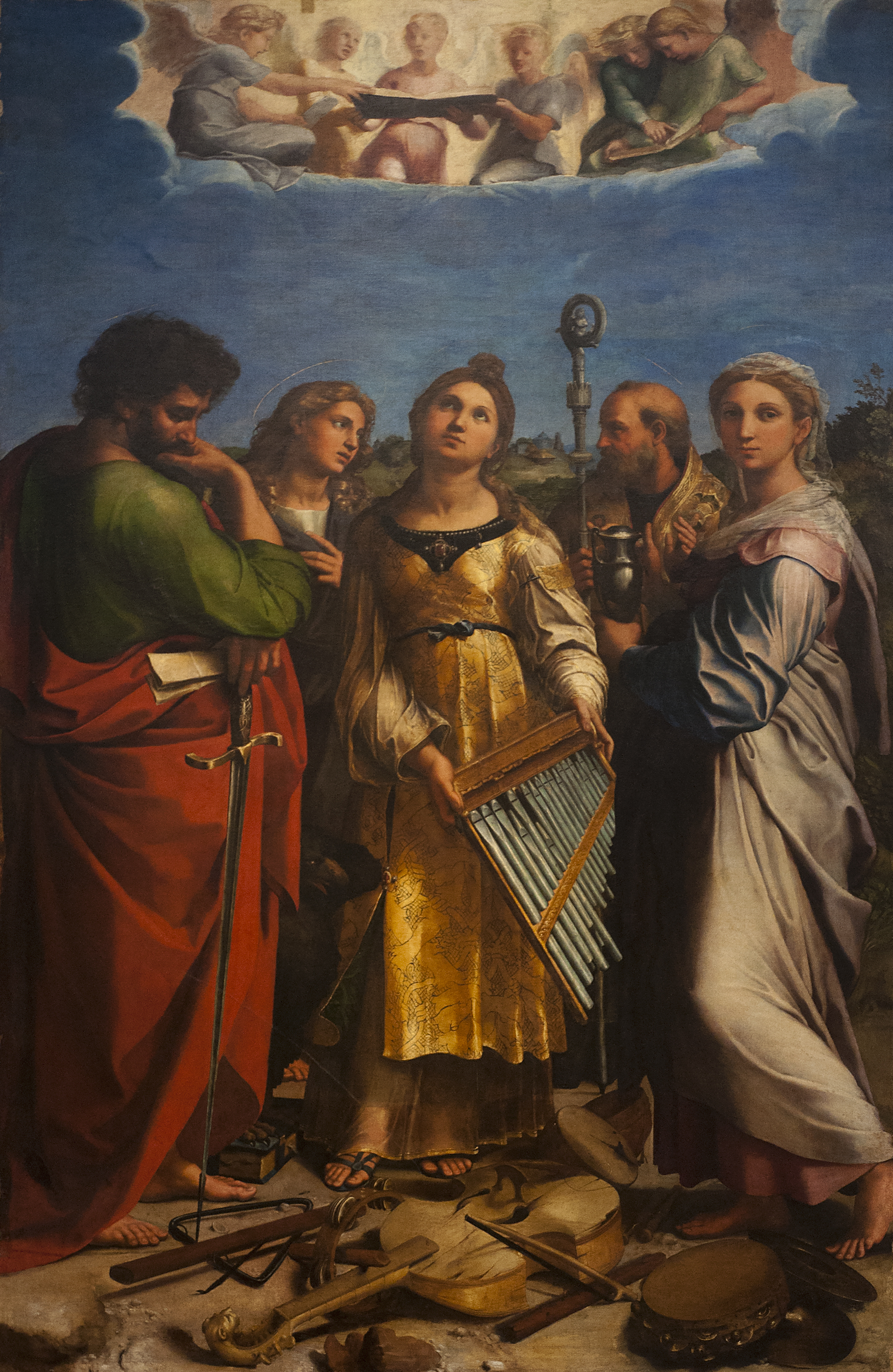
The Ecstasy of St. Cecilia by Raphael, now in the Pinacoteca of Bologna but originally commissioned for the San Giovanni

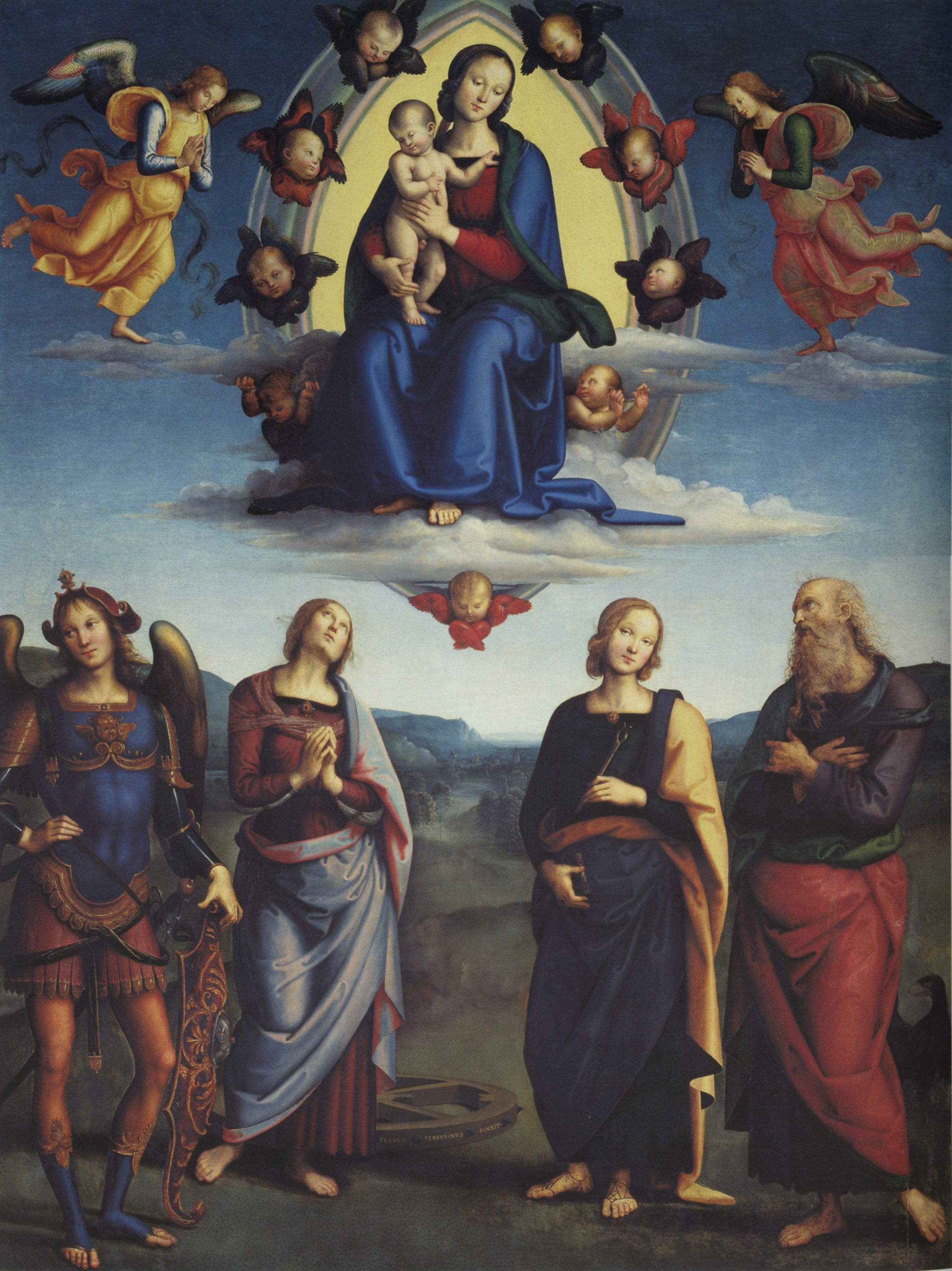
Madonna in Glory with Saints by Perugino, now in the Pinacoteca of Bologna
