= Eugenio Visdomini =

Italian poet and lawyer

Eugenio Visdomini (1550 - 1622) was an Italian poet and lawyer, active in Parma.

== Biography ==
He was born in Parma, and studied law, but dedicated himself to literature. In 1574, along with Giulio Smagliati, he founded the local literary and musical society, Accademia degli Innominati. Among the members were Orazio Bassano, Francesco Patrizi, and the poets Torquato Tasso, Giovanni Battista Guarini, Muzio Manfredi, Angelo Ingegneri, and Pomponio Torelli. He was chosen by Ottavio Farnese, Duke of Parma, to be governor of Novara, and later became secretary to the Duchy. He translated the De partu Virginis (Il Parto della Vergine) by Giacomo Sannazaro into ottava rima (1575) and wrote a number of sonnets for works of contemporaries. He also wrote a number of dramas (l'Amata, Edipo, and Erminia) for the Parmesan court, which remained unpublished in his lifetime.
