= Schutterij =

Historic militia in the Netherlands

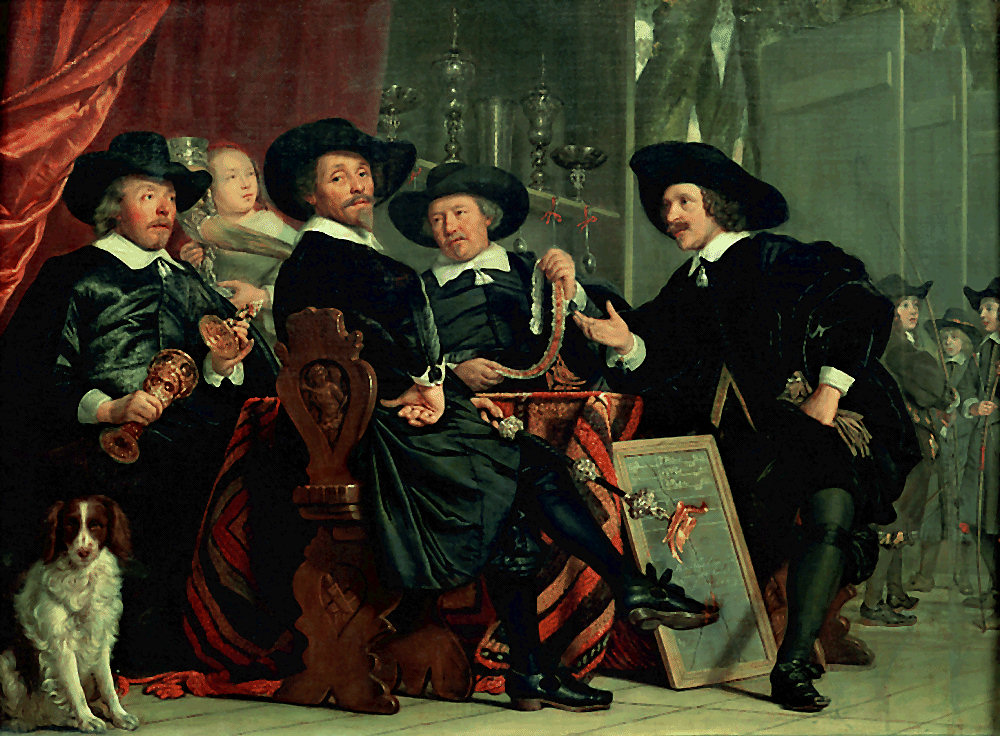
The Amsterdam archery militia whose patron saint was St. Sebastian, in 1653, by Bartholomeus van der Helst

Schutterij (pl. schutterijen; Dutch pronunciation: [sxʏtəˈrɛi]) refers to a voluntary city guard or citizen militia in the medieval and early modern Netherlands, intended to protect the town or city from attack and act in case of revolt or fire. Their training grounds were often on open spaces within the city, near the city walls, but, when the weather did not allow, inside a church. They are mostly grouped according to their district and to the weapon that they used: bow, crossbow or gun. Together, the members of a schutterij are called a schuttersgilde, which could be roughly translated as a "shooter's guild". It is now a title applied to ceremonial shooting clubs and to the country's Olympic rifle team.

== Function ==
The schutterij, civic guard, or town watch, was a defensive military support system for the city authorities. Its officers were wealthy citizens of the town or city concerned, appointed by the city magistrates. In the Northern Netherlands, after the change to Protestantism that followed the Beeldenstorm and, depending on the town, took place sometime between 1566 and 1580, the officers had to be a member of the Dutch Reformed Church. The captain was usually a wealthy local resident, and the group's ensign was a wealthy young bachelor (often recognisable in group portraits of schutterijen by his particularly fine clothes and the flag he is carrying). Joining as an officer for a couple of years was often a stepping stone to other important public posts within the city. The members were expected to buy their own weapon and uniform. Each night, two men guarded their district in two shifts, from 22:00 until 02:00, and from 02:00 until 06:00, closing and opening the gates of the city. At a set time each month, the schutters would parade under the command of an officer.

The ideal was that, for every hundred inhabitants, three would belong to the schutterij. The Dutch Mennonites were excluded from a position in the schutterij in the 16th, 17th and 18th centuries and paid a double tax in lieu of service. Roman Catholics were permitted in the lower regions. Persons in the service of the city (such as the minister, the city-physician, the teacher, the sexton, the beer-bearers and peat bearers), and the city's Jews, did not need to serve. The beer and peat bearers had to serve as the town's firefighters instead.

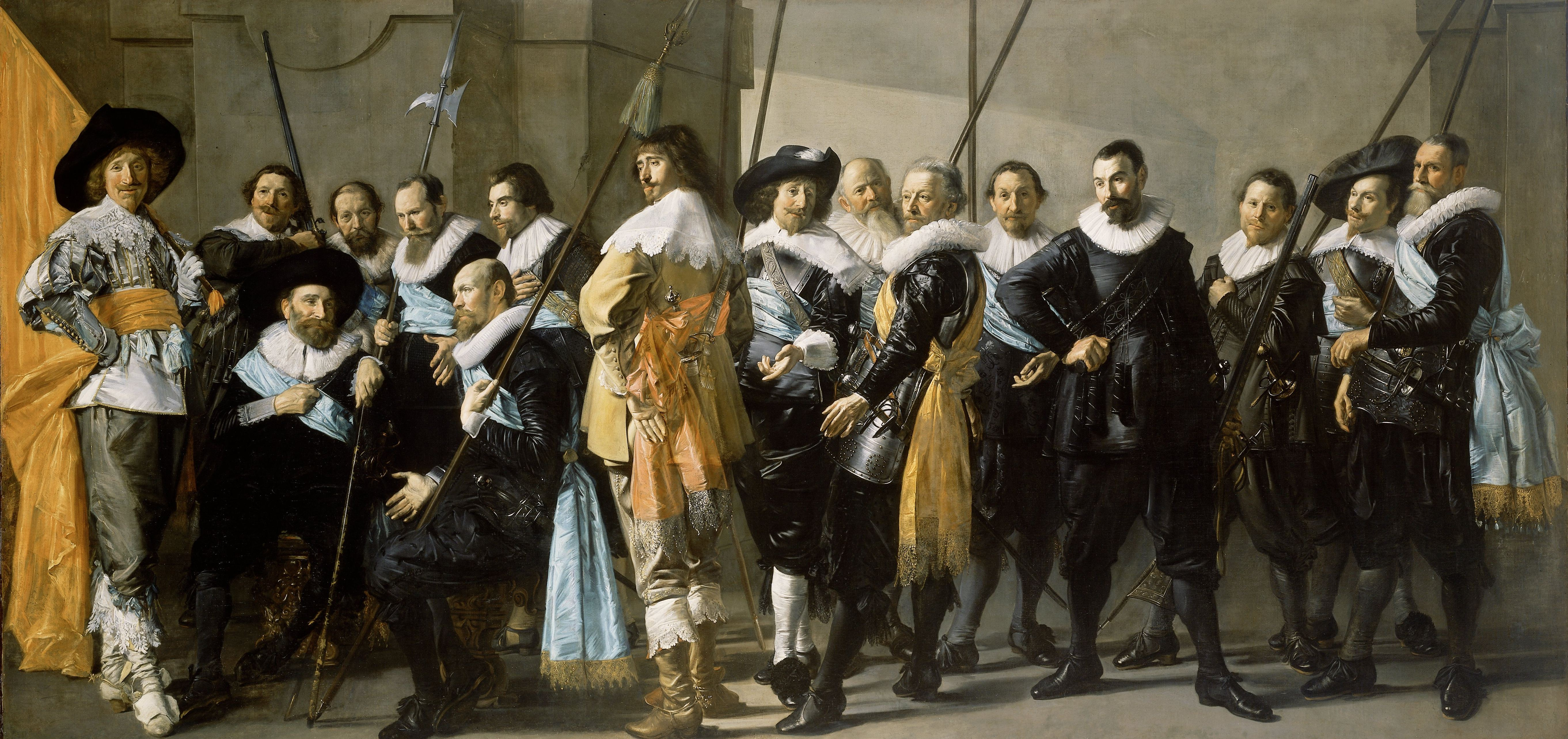
De Magere Compagnie ("The Meagre Company"), a schutterstuk for one of the Amsterdam guilds by Frans Hals and Pieter Codde, painted in 1633-37.

== Training grounds ==
The schutters (traditionally archers) or kloveniers (musket bearers) met at target practice grounds called the Doelen (targets). These fields were generally adjoining a large building where they met indoors for gymnastic exercises and held their meetings. It was in these great halls where the large group portraits hung for centuries, and many paintings suffered dramatically from enthusiastic gymnasts over the years. These locations were not the only place the schutters met each other. These guilds also kept altars in local churches, where they met for religious reasons. Most schutterij guilds had as patron saints Saint Sebastian (Dutch: Sint Sebastiaan), Saint Anthony (Dutch: Sint Anthonius), Saint George (Dutch: Sint Joris), or Adrian of Nicomedia (Dutch: Sint Adriaen). These religious duties were a significant part of the guild membership since that is also where they paid their dues.

After the Protestant Reformation, all the altars were disbanded in the Dutch Reformed Churches in the Northern Netherlands, and membership dues were no longer paid in church, but at the city hall. In Amsterdam, the guilds were no longer allowed to make rules or spend money on their own, but in Haarlem, there were two guilds who kept their original rules (St. Adriaen and St. Joris), such as holding banquets and collecting for sick members or widows. Though they moved premises several times, some of the old Haarlem schutterij Doelen halls still stand where the schutters met and where their group paintings hung, though these paintings are now preserved carefully in the Frans Hals Museum (with the notable exception of Cornelis Engelsz's 1612 painting The St Adrian Civic Guard, which is in the Musée des Beaux-Arts de Strasbourg, France).

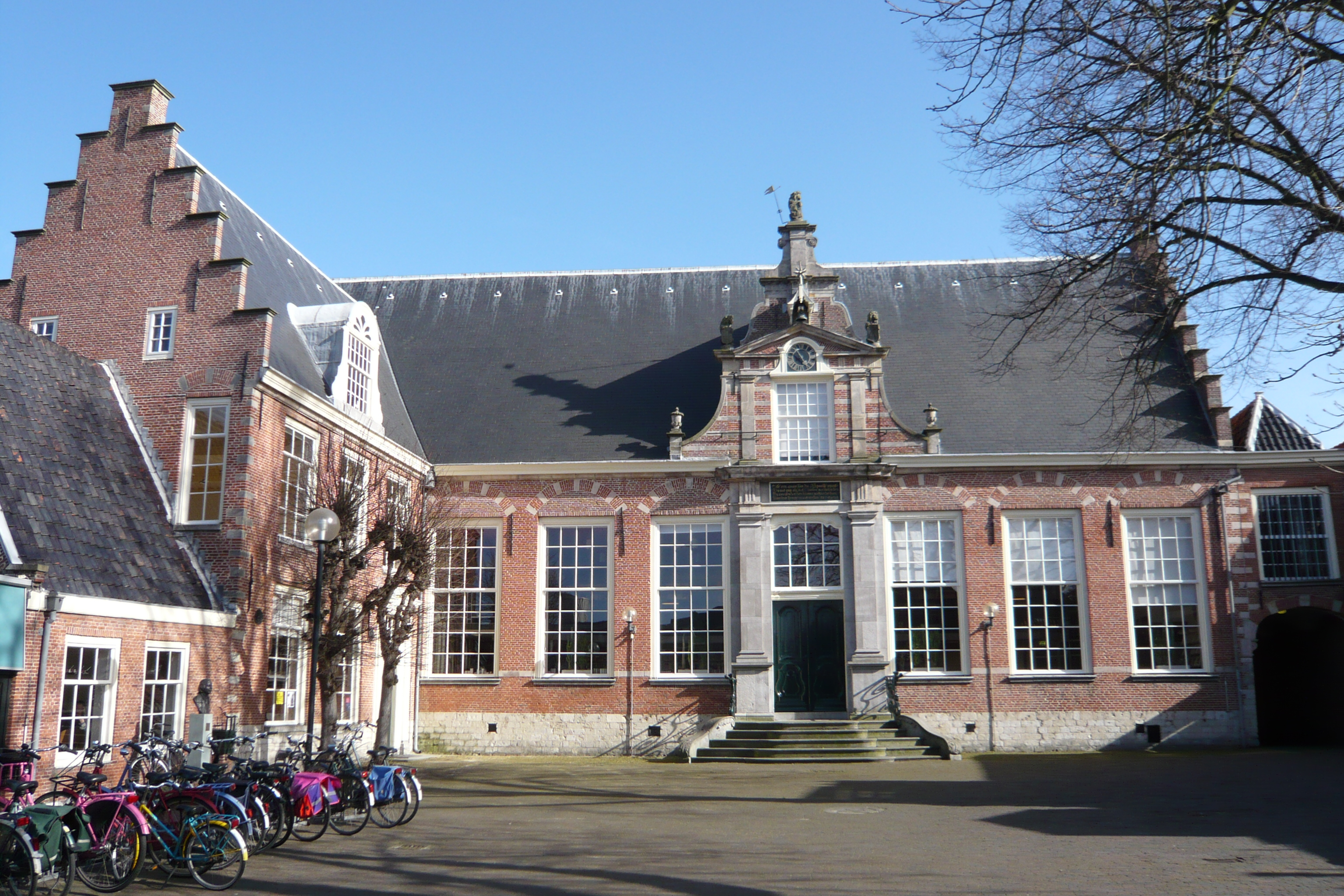
Meeting hall of the kloveniers, now the Stadsbibliotheek Haarlem, with a commemorative plaque above the door, placed 200 years after the Siege of Haarlem, when many Kloveniers died defending the city.

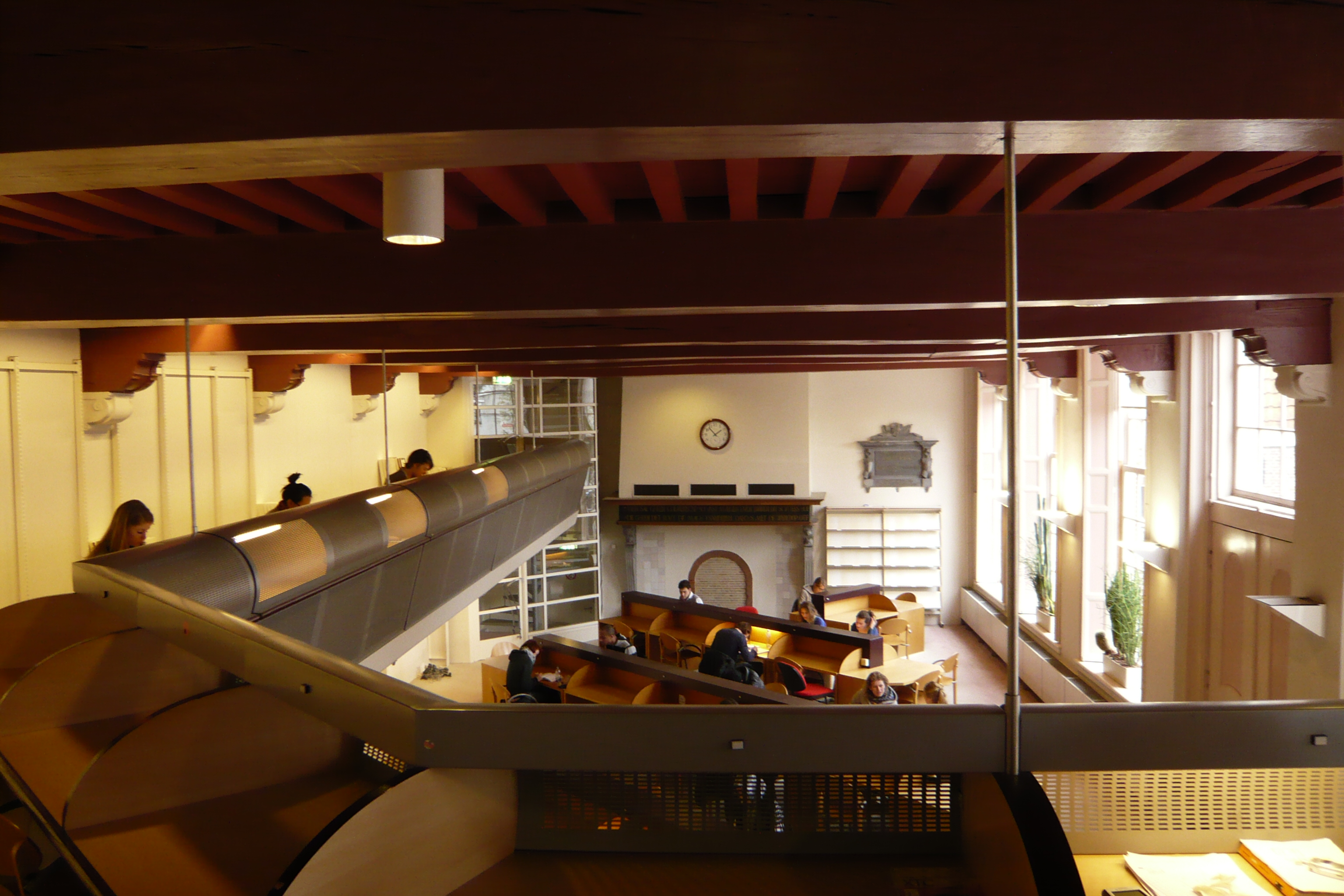
For centuries a meeting hall and scene of indoor target practise. In the 20th century a gym for the local High School, and now a peaceful study hall.

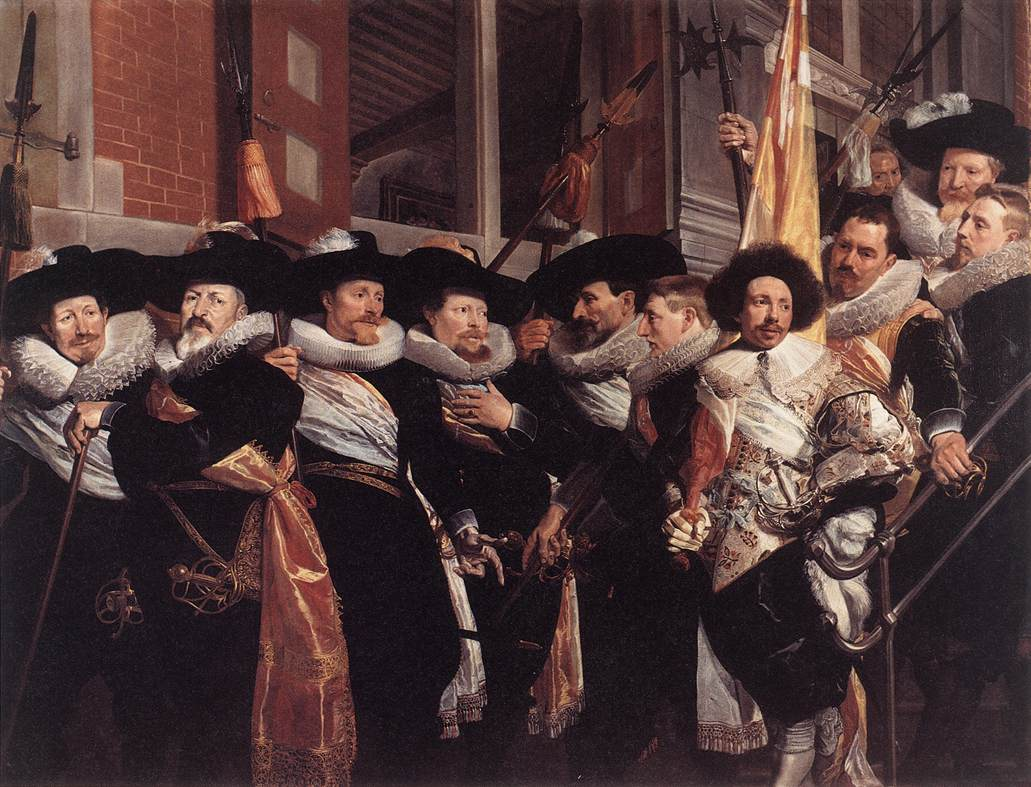
The Officers of the St Adrian Militia Company in 1630 by Hendrik Gerritsz Pot on what is now library steps. Through the window one sees the study hall ceiling.

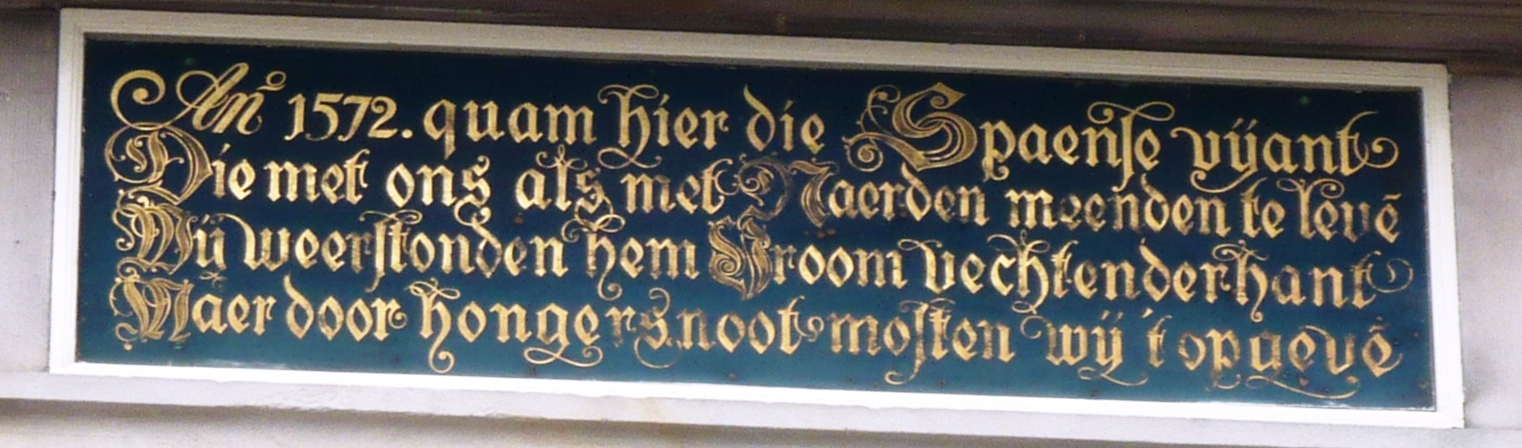
Above the door: "In 1572 the Spanish enemy came here to treat us the same way as Naarden. We withstood him, fighting bravely, but from hunger we had to give up."

== Schutterstuk ==
Rembrandt's The Night Watch shows a schutterij preparing to move out.

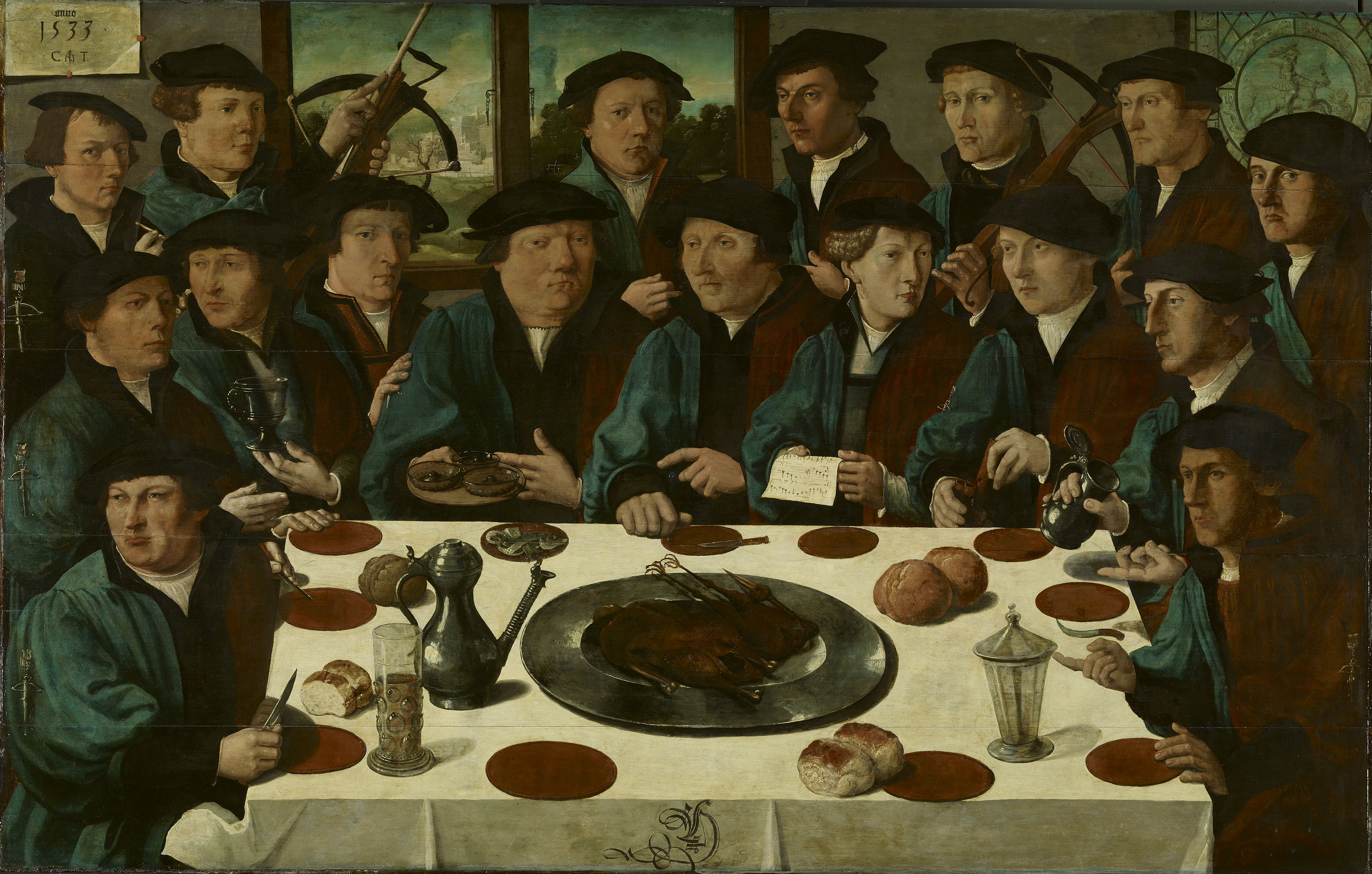
A very early example; the 1533 Banquet of Members of Amsterdam's Crossbow Civic Guard by Cornelis Anthonisz., with a stiff and unsubtle depiction

After 1581, the schutterij were officially prohibited from influencing city politics, but since the ruling regenten, 'regents' were all members of these guilds, that was quite hard to do. Once a year they held a banquet, with beer and a roasted ox. Whenever a changeover of the leading officers occurred, a local painter was invited to paint the members, and the scene most popularly chosen for these group portraits was the banquet scene. Though occasionally they were shown outside in active duty, the members were usually portrayed for posterity dressed in their Sunday best, rather than their guard dress. These 'militia group portraits' include some of the grandest portraiture in Dutch Golden Age painting.

Group portraits were popular among the large numbers of civic associations that were a notable part of Dutch life, such as the officers of a city's schutterij or militia guards, boards of trustees and regents of guilds and charitable foundations and the like. Especially in the first half of the century, portraits were very formal and stiff in composition. Early examples showed them dining, with each person looking at the viewer. Later groups showed most figures standing for a more dynamic composition. Much attention was paid to fine details in clothing, and where applicable, to furniture and other signs of a person's position in society. Later in the century groups became livelier and colours brighter. Rembrandt's Syndics of the Drapers' Guild is a subtle treatment of a group round a table.

A similar commemorative group painting tradition, the Regents group portrait, was true for other Dutch guilds and institutions as well, such as orphanages, hospitals, and hofjes. In the case of the schutterijen, such a painting was known in Dutch as a schuttersstuk (pl. schuttersstukken). After the schutters agreed how they wanted to be depicted together in paint, for such paintings each member usually paid and posed separately so that each individual portrait within the group was as accurate as possible, and the artist's fee could be paid. Most group portraits of militia guards were commissioned in Haarlem and Amsterdam, and were much more flamboyant and relaxed or even boisterous than other types of portraits, as well as much larger. Rembrandt's famous The Militia Company of Captain Frans Banning Cocq, better known as The Night Watch (Dutch: De Nachtwacht) (1642), was an ambitious and not entirely successful attempt to show a group in action, setting out for a patrol or parade and also innovative in avoiding the typical very wide format of such works. The reason for this was probably that banquets for guilds had been banned in Amsterdam since 1522.

Every member of the schutterij who wanted to be in the group portrait, paid the painter, depending on his position in the painting. The cost of group portraits was usually shared by the subjects, often not equally. The amount paid might determine each person's place in the picture, either head to toe in full regalia in the foreground or face only in the back of the group. Sometimes, all group members paid an equal sum, which was likely to lead to quarrels when some members gained a more prominent place in the picture than others. According to local legend, the schutterij was unhappy with the result in The Night Watch: instead of a group of proud and orderly men, they alleged that Rembrandt had not painted what he saw. Ernst van de Wetering declared in 2006 that The Night Watch "in a certain sense fails.... Rembrandt wanted to paint the chaos of figures walking through each other, yet also aim for an organised composition."

Winning a commission for a schuttersstuk was a highly competitive task, with young portrait painters competing with each other to impress members of the schutterij. Often it helped if the painter became a member of the schuttersgilde, and Frans Hals, Hendrik Gerritsz Pot, and Caesar van Everdingen were all members of schuttersgildes who won such commissions. The commission itself was a guaranteed income for a year, but often the painter would win additional commissions to do the rest of the sitter's family, or make a separate copy of the sitter's portrait for private use. The tricky part of fishing for a schuttersstuk commission was that it was never known when a schuttersstuk would be commissioned since that happened only when one of the leading officers died, retired, or moved away.

An example of a young painter who successfully launched his career in that way is Bartholomeus van der Helst. His self-portrait is in the very painting that was his first schutterstuk commission in 1639 and resulted in a lucrative contract with the Amsterdam Bicker family. In Amsterdam, most of those paintings would ultimately end up in the possession of the city council, and many are now on display in the Amsterdams Historisch Museum; there are no significant examples outside the Netherlands.

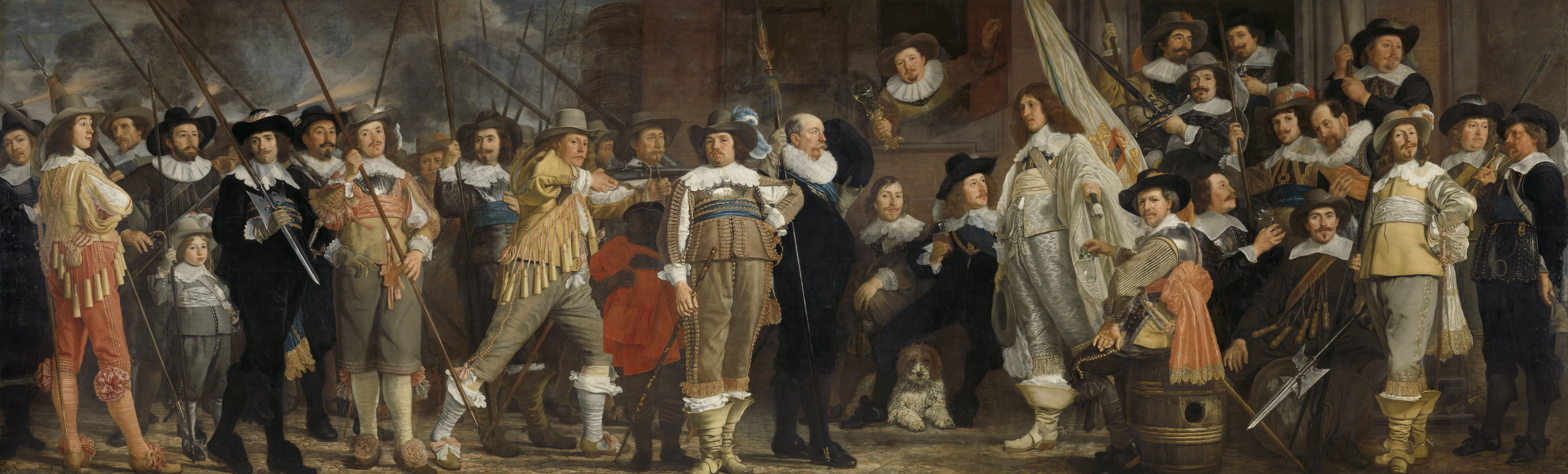
The Company of Roelof Bicker and Luitenant Jan Michaelsz Blauw, painted by Van der Helst in 1639.

== Decline ==
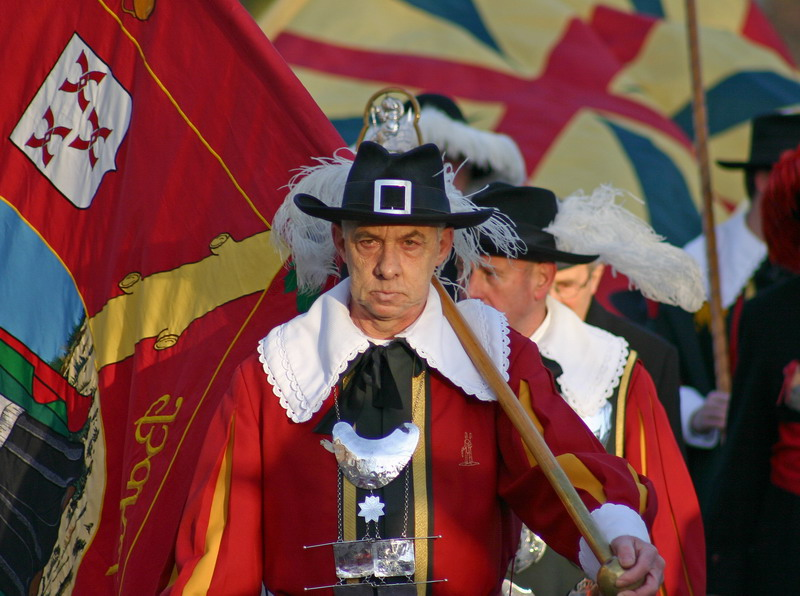
Flag-bearer at Bakel, North Brabant, Netherlands

In 1748 the Doelisten demanded that stadtholder William IV, Prince of Orange allow the middle class to appoint the militia's officers, but William refused, since in some towns the bourgeois could not even be considered as candidates for these offices. By the second half of the 18th century the schutterij were inactive (sometimes only exercising once a year and with the ill or rich buying their way out of service) and only of importance to Orangists. This brought them much criticism. Translations of the books by Andrew Fletcher and Richard Price became very popular. The Patriots faction tried to breathe new life into the schutterij in 1783 or to create an alternative - in many cities, exercitiegenootschappen (military-exercise societies), vrijcorpsen (free corps) or voluntary schutterijen arose which anybody could join and with officers chosen democratically. The Orangists poked fun at the ministers, like François Adriaan van der Kemp propagating the system from the pulpit and shopkeepers joining the new militia.

The system of schutterijen no longer worked after five hundred years, which was controlled by a select group of Dutch Reformed families, but it survived the Batavian Revolution and French occupation of the Kingdom of Holland until finally William I of the Netherlands set up professional police forces. In 1901, the schutterijen were abolished.

== Currently ==
There are many schutterijen in the Netherlands who still honour the old traditions; in the Catholic regions many municipalities have several of them. For instance the schutterij of Geertruidenberg, made up of people who meet regularly to dress in traditional costume and demonstrate how cannons were used in strongholds. Most of these schutterijen (also known as) gilden were founded in the 1300-1600 and some of the earliest in 1100-1200. Some of these schutterijen towards the north of the Netherlands were founded during the first half of the 20th century and many of them are the same kind of associations as a German Schützenbruderschaft. Likewise, the Oud Limburgs Schuttersfeest ('Old Limburgish Schutter Festival') is an annual event in which more than 160 schutterijen (Limburgish: sjötterie) from Belgian and Dutch Limburg compete against each other. The winner organises the event the following year and takes home "De Um", the highest prize for a schutter. There are multiple different kinds of these in different Provinces in the Netherlands for example NBFS that's for North-Brabant they have around 270 schutterijen. Sometimes referred to as Noord-Brabantse Schuttersgilden, but that is not the official term.
