= Oud Limburgs Schuttersfeest =

Annual shooting tournament

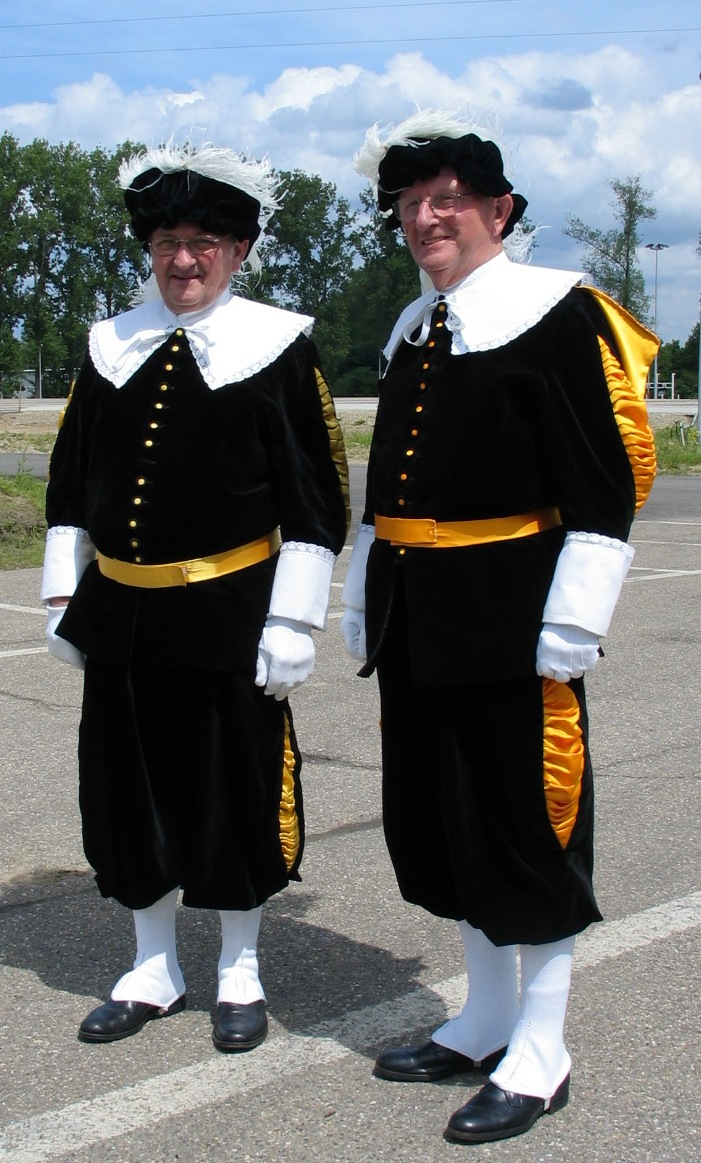
Two schutters of Koninklijke Schutterij Sint-Sebastiaan Sint-Huibrechts-Lille in Neerpelt

old newsreel footage of a Schuttersfeest with procession of schutters led by a guildmaster wearing guild shields

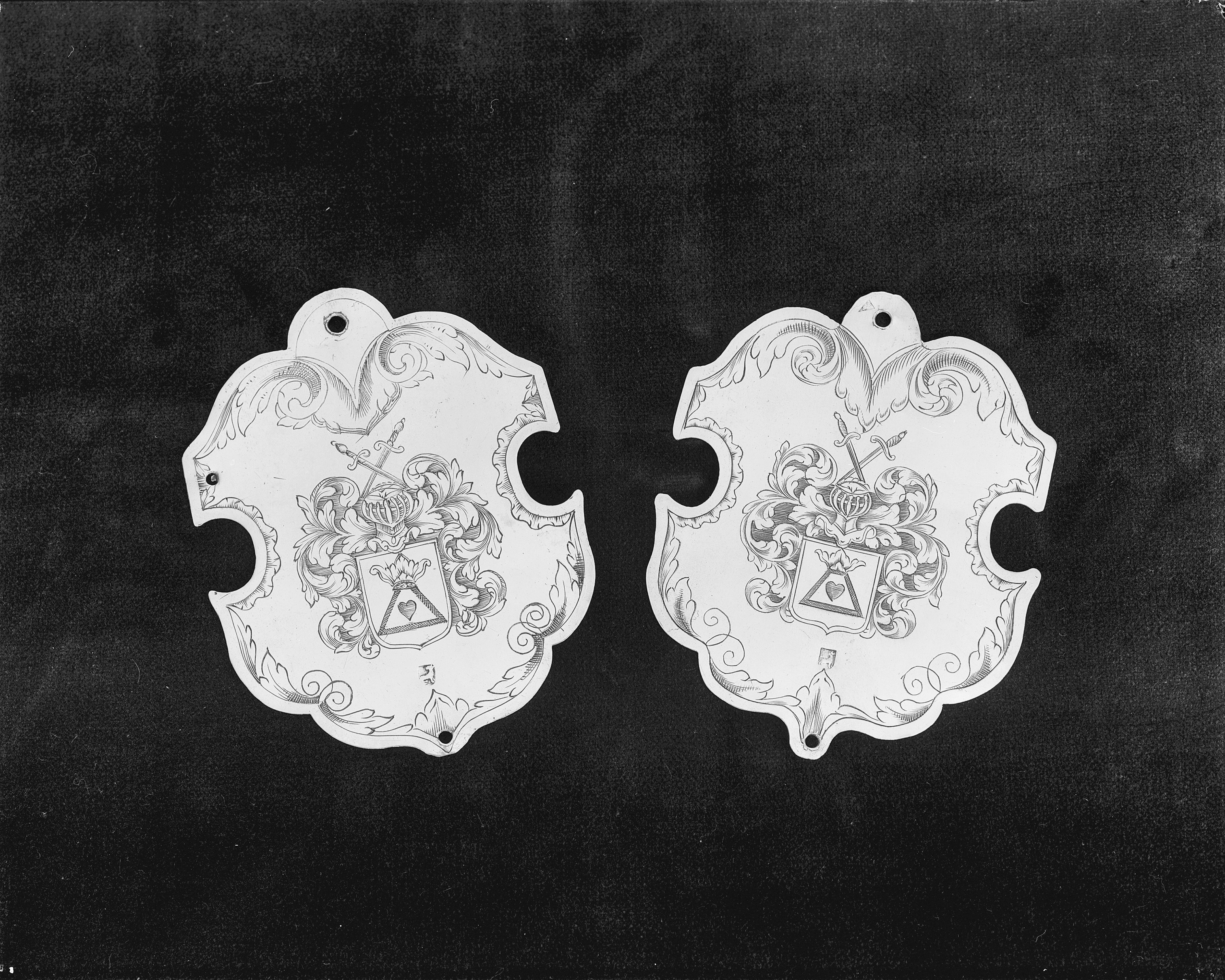
Guild shields of Overasselt

The Oud Limburgs Schuttersfeest (abbreviated as OLS, literally translated Old Limburgian Shooters' Festival) is an annual shooting tournament during which shooting associations (Dutch: schutterijen; Limburgian: sjötterie) from across the region of Limburg, nowadays split in a Dutch and Belgian part, compete against each other. The winner organizes the event the following year and takes home "De Um", the highest prize for a shooter (schutter). The 2022 winner is Sint Martinus from Born.

Each schutterij, or shooting association participates in the tournament with 6 members. Utilising an approximately 15 kg. carbine, with self-made bullets of lead, participants are required to shoot square blocks (called bölkes) from a stick. This is to be executed across 20 meter of distance.

Ten "schutter" unions unite approximately 170 schutterij guilds, with a total of approximately 10,000 members in the Netherlands and Belgium.

The OLS is recognised and protected as Intangible cultural heritage of Flanders and the Netherlands.
