= San Benedetto, Bologna =

Roman Catholic church in Bologna, Italy

Coordinates: 44.5018°N 11.3442°E

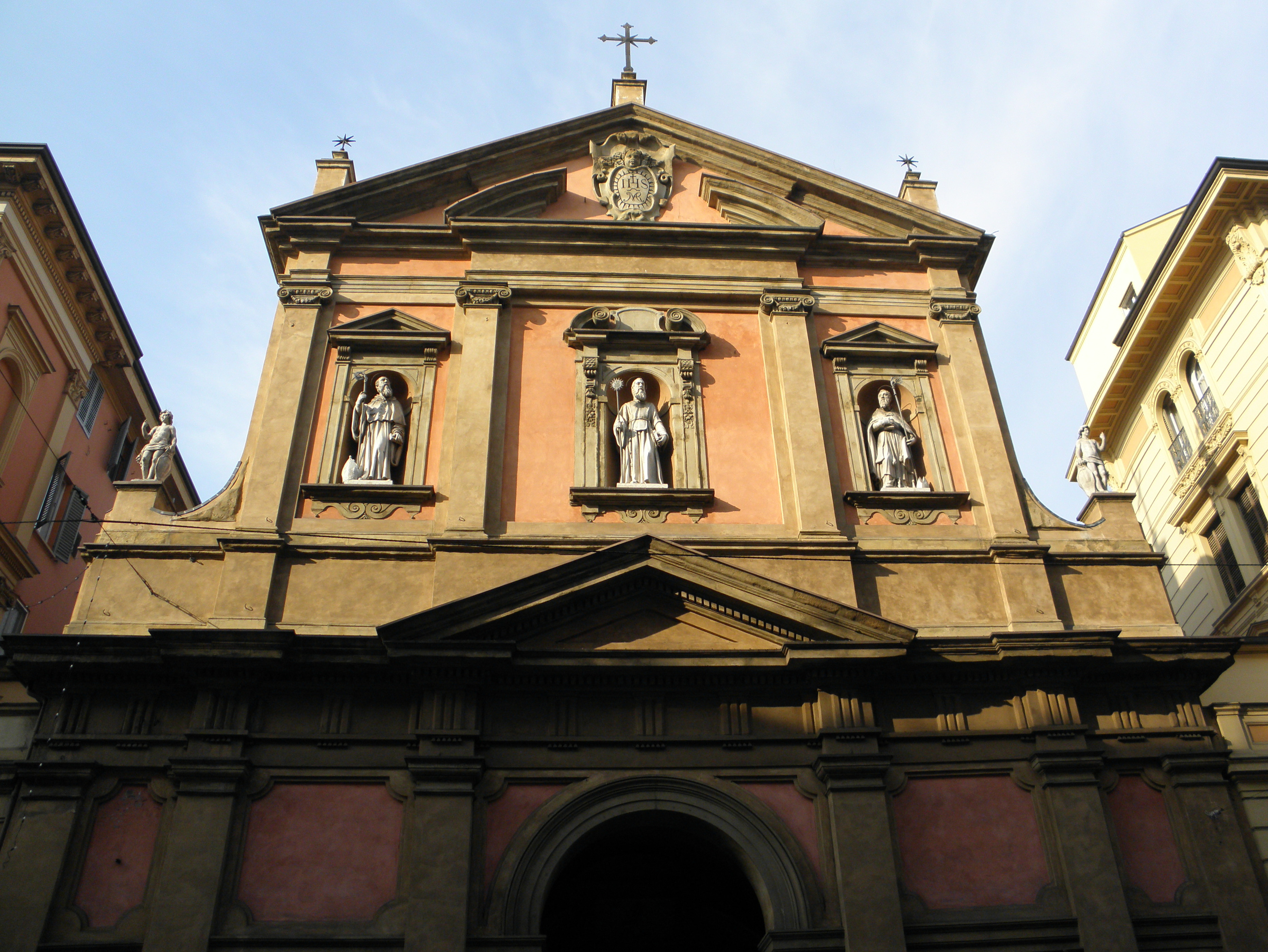
San Benedetto, facade

San Benedetto is a Roman Catholic church in central Bologna. Founded in the 12th century, the church now has facade (1606) designed by Giovanni Battista Ballerini. The Facade was rotated 180 degrees in 1892; it once faced Via Galliera, and now faces Via dell'Indipendenza. The interior contains works by Giacomo Cavedoni, Alessandro Tiarini, Cesare Aretusi, Lucio Massari, Ercole Procaccini il Vecchio, Ubaldo Gandolfi, and a sculpture by Angelo Gabriello Piò.
