= Pomponio Torelli =

Italian writer, poet and dramatist

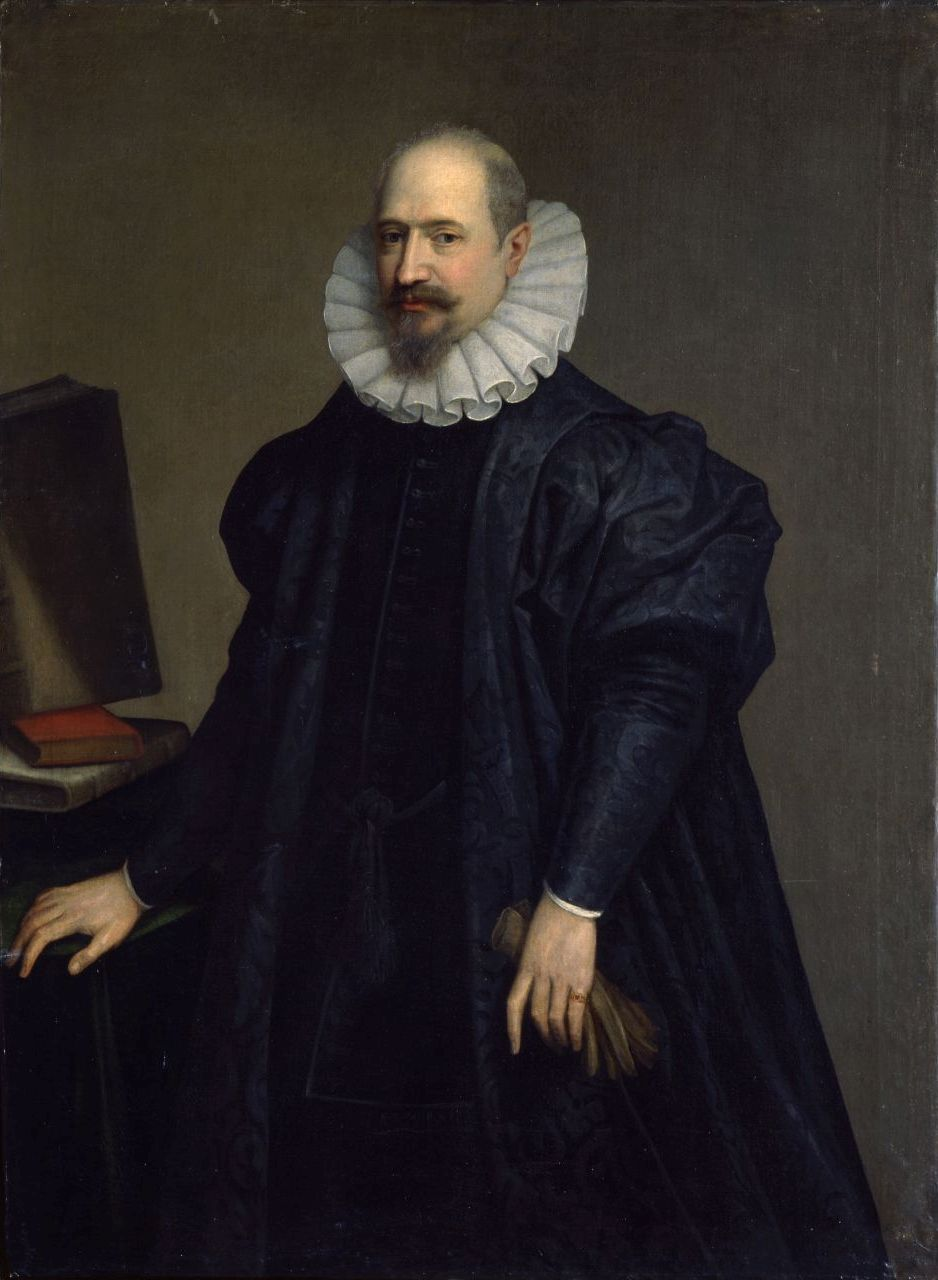
- Portrait of Pomponio Torelli by Cesare Aretusi, now in the Galleria Nazionale di Parma
- Born: 1539; Montechiarugolo
- Died: 9 April 1608 (aged 68–69); Parma
- Occupation: writer
- Known for: Renaissance tragedies

Pomponio Torelli (1539 – 9 April 1608) was Count of Montechiarugolo and a writer of prose, poetry and plays. He is principally remembered for his five tragedies.

== Life ==
Torelli was born in 1539 at Montechiarugolo near Parma, which until the creation of the Duchy of Parma in 1545 was in the Duchy of Milan. He was the third son of Paolo Torelli (1509–1545) and his second wife Beatrice Pico della Mirandola (died 1546), who was the great-niece of Giovanni Pico della Mirandola. In 1545 Torelli's father died and he succeeded at the age of six to the title of Count of Montechiarugolo; his mother died in the following year. He was tutored at home by Andrea Casali, then studied at Padua under Bernardino Tomitano and Francesco Robortello.

In 1566 he was knighted by the second Duke of Parma, Ottavio Farnese, and made ambassador to Flanders. In 1573 he married Isabella Bonelli, great-niece of pope Pius V and sister of cardinal Michele Bonelli. The third Duke of Parma, Alessandro Farnese, appointed Torelli tutor to his son Ranuccio Farnese, and entrusted him with diplomatic missions in Flanders and in Spain.

Under the nickname Il Perduto, "the lost one", Torelli was a leading figure in the Accademia degli Innominati, a society of learned and literary men founded in Parma on 13 June 1574, which ceased activity in 1608, the year of Torelli's death.

Torelli died in Parma on 9 April 1608. A portrait of him by Cesare Aretusi was commissioned in 1602 by Giovan Battista Masi, who married Torelli's daughter Clelia in 1604 and who, with Torelli's son and heir Pio, was among those beheaded on 19 May 1612 for involvement in the Congiura dei feudatari, or "plot of the feudal lords", against Ranuccio Farnese. The painting is now in the Galleria Nazionale di Parma.

== Works ==
Torelli wrote love poetry in the style of Petrarch; his Rime were published in 1575, with an expanded edition in 1586, and his Scherzi poetici in 1598. His six books of Carmina in Latin were printed in Parma in 1600. His Trattato del debito del cavalliero (1596) and Trattato delle passioni dell'animo contain his Neoplatonist philosophical discussions of affects, emotions and the duties of the knight. He is however principally remembered for his tragedies: La Merope was published in 1589, Il Tancredi in 1597, La Galatea in 1603, and La Vittoria, on Pietro della Vigna, and Il Polidoro both in 1605. The composition and structure of these plays shows an influence of Greek tragedy unusual for his time.

=== Editions ===
- Rime amorose del conte Pomponio Torelli detto il Perduto, nell'Academia de gli illustri signori Innominati di Parma. In Parma: appresso Seth Viotti, 1575
- Rime del conte Pomponio Torelli, nell'Academia de gli illustrissimi signori Innominati di Parma il Perduto. Di nuouo ristampate, & corrette, con aggiunta di molte compositioni, che non erano nella prima editione. In Parma: [Erasmo Viotti], 1586
- La Merope, tragedia del conte Pomponio Torello, detto nell'Academia de gli Innominati di Parma il Perduto. In Parma: appresso Erasmo Viotto, 1589
- Trattato del debito del caualliero, di Pomponio Torelli. In Venetia: appresso Giouan Battista Ciotti senese, al segno dell'Aurora, 1596; another edition, In Parma: nella stamperia di Erasmo Viotti, 1596
- Il Tancredi, tragedia di Pomponio Torelli conte di Montechiarugolo, nell'Academia de' sig. Innominati di Parma il Perduto. In Parma: per Erasmo Viotti, 1597
- Scherzi poetici dell'illustriss. s. Pomponio Torello. In Verona: appresso Girolamo Discepolo, 1598
- Pomponii Taurelli, Montisclariculi comitis, academici Innominati Parmensis Carminum libri sex. Parmae: ex typographia Erasmi Viotti, 1600
- La Galatea del conte Pomponio Torelli: nell'illustriss. Academia de gli Innominati il Perduto. In Parma: Nella stamperia di Erasmo Viotti, MDCIII [1603]
- La Vittoria, tragedia di Pomponio Torelli conte di Montechiarugolo, nell'Academia de' Sig. Innominati di Parma il Perduto. In Parma: Nella stamperia di Erasmo Viotti, 1605
- Il Polidoro, tragedia di Pomponio Torelli, conte di Montechiarugolo, nell'Academia de' Sig. Innominati di Parma il Perduto. In Parma: Nella stamperia di Erasmo Viotti, 1605.

A complete edition of his works was published in three volumes by Guanda between 2008 and 2017:

- Nicola Catelli, Andrea Torre, Alessandro Bianchi, Gianluca Genovese (editors) (2008). Opere, I. Poesie con il Trattato della poesia lirica. Parma: Ugo Guanda Editore. ISBN 9788860888686.
- Alessandro Bianchi, Stefano Tomassini, Vincenzo Guercio (editors) (2009). Opere, II. Teatro. Parma: Ugo Guanda Editore. ISBN 9788860889171.
- Fabrizio Bondi, Gianluca Genovese, Nunzio Ruggiero, Andrea Torre (editors) (2017). Opere, III. Prose, introduzioni, testi critici, commenti e apparati. Parma: Ugo Guanda Editore. ISBN 9788860886156.
