= The St Adrian Civic Guard =

1612 painting by Cornelis Engelsz

- French: La Garde civique de Saint-Adrien
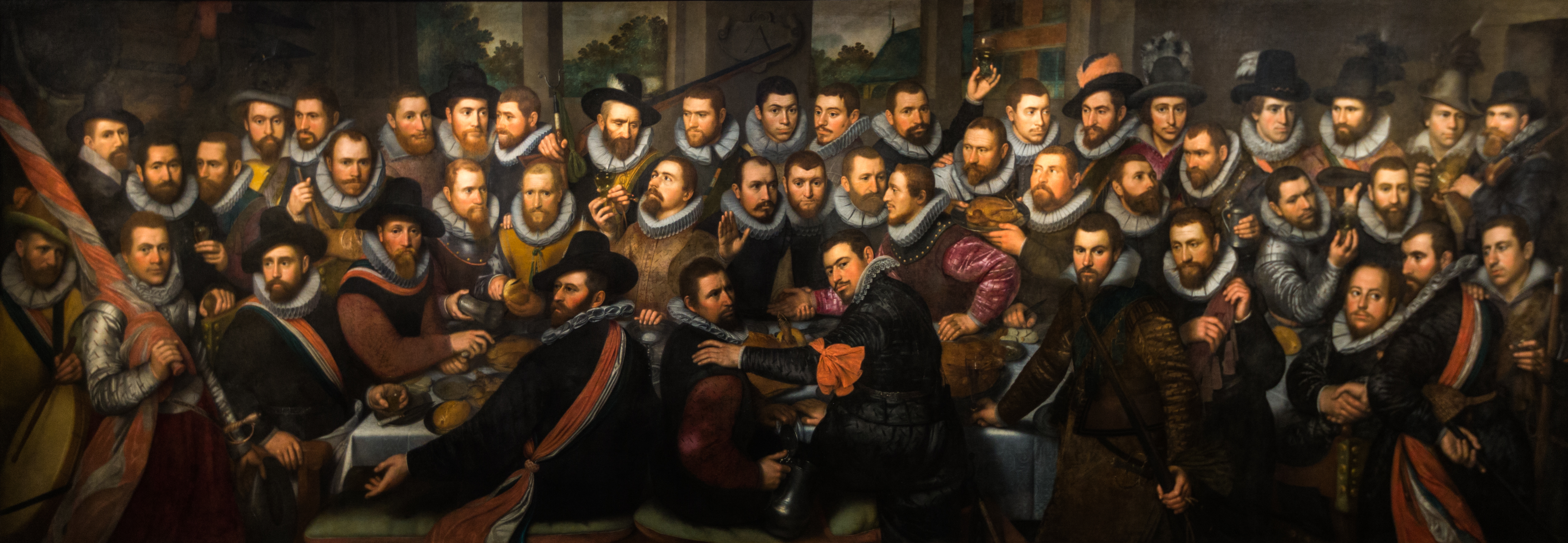
- Artist: Cornelis Engelsz.
- Year: 1612
- Medium: oil painting on canvas
- Movement: Dutch Golden Age painting Militia group portrait
- Subject: Haarlem schutterij
- Dimensions: 178 cm × 510 cm (70 in × 200 in)
- Location: Musée des Beaux-Arts, Strasbourg
- Accession: 1897

The St Adrian Civic Guard is a 1612 militia group portrait painting by the Dutch artist Cornelis Engelsz. It is now in the Musée des Beaux-Arts of Strasbourg, France. Its inventory number is 364.
The painting was bought from Charles Sedelmeyer in 1895 by the director of the Strasbourg museum, Wilhelm von Bode, and entered the collections two years later. As of 2014, it was the only Dutch painting of that kind (schuttersstuk; English: "militia piece") in a French museum.

The painting depicts a banquet of 46 men in arms from the voluntary civic guard of Haarlem. The scene takes place in the civic guard meeting hall, and that is where the painting probably used to hang until the 18th century. One of these faces is supposed to be a self-portrait of Engelsz. Due to its size – The St Adrian Civic Guard is by far the largest Old Master painting in the Strasbourg collection – the painting could not be evacuated during World War II and was severely damaged when Palais Rohan was hit during an Anglo-American bombing raid on 11 August 1944. Poor post-war restoration work made the damage even worse, and Engelsz.' painting disappeared from sight until late 2008, when a partnership was launched between the museum and BNP Paribas in order to restore it for good. After five years of work, the restored painting was then revealed to the public in early 2014.

The style of the painting is inspired by Cornelis van Haarlem and does seem archaic next to Frans Hals's The Banquet of the Officers of the St George Militia Company in 1616, which revolutionized the genre by its liveliness and dynamism. Following that example, Engelsz.' next schuttersstuk, The Banquet of the Officers of the St Adrian Militia Company in 1618 (in the collection of the Frans Hals Museum), would then look nothing like the Strasbourg painting.

== Details ==
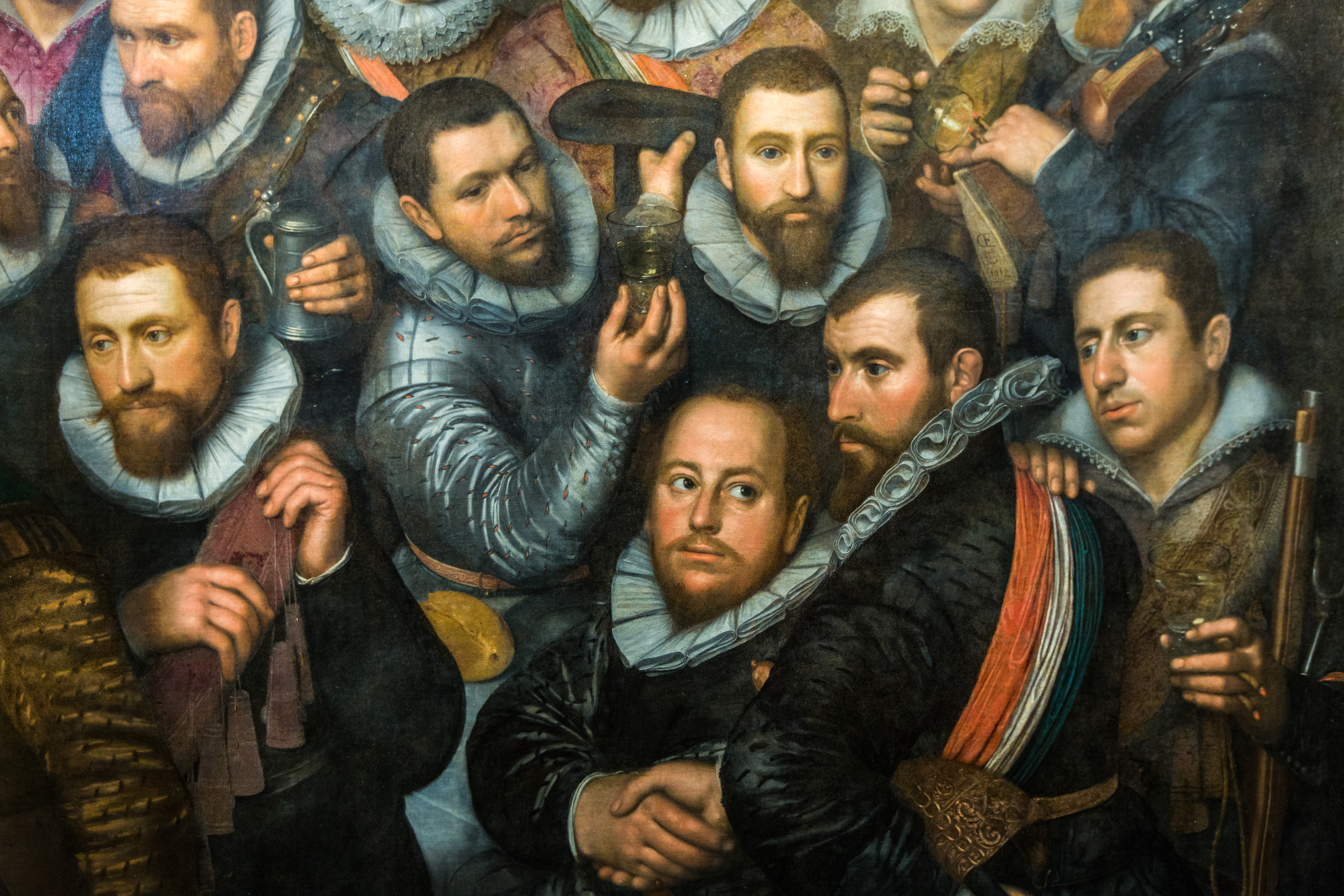

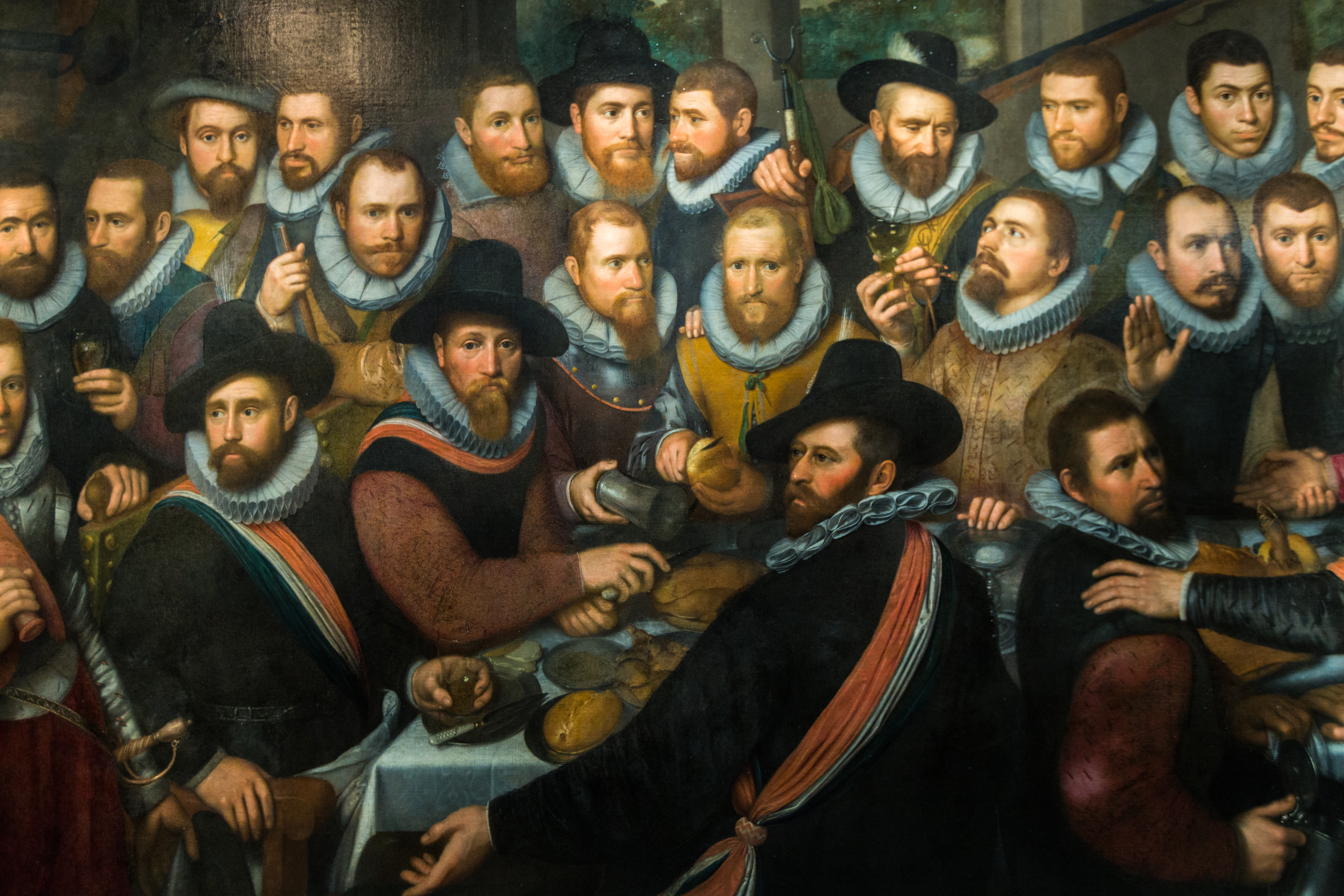

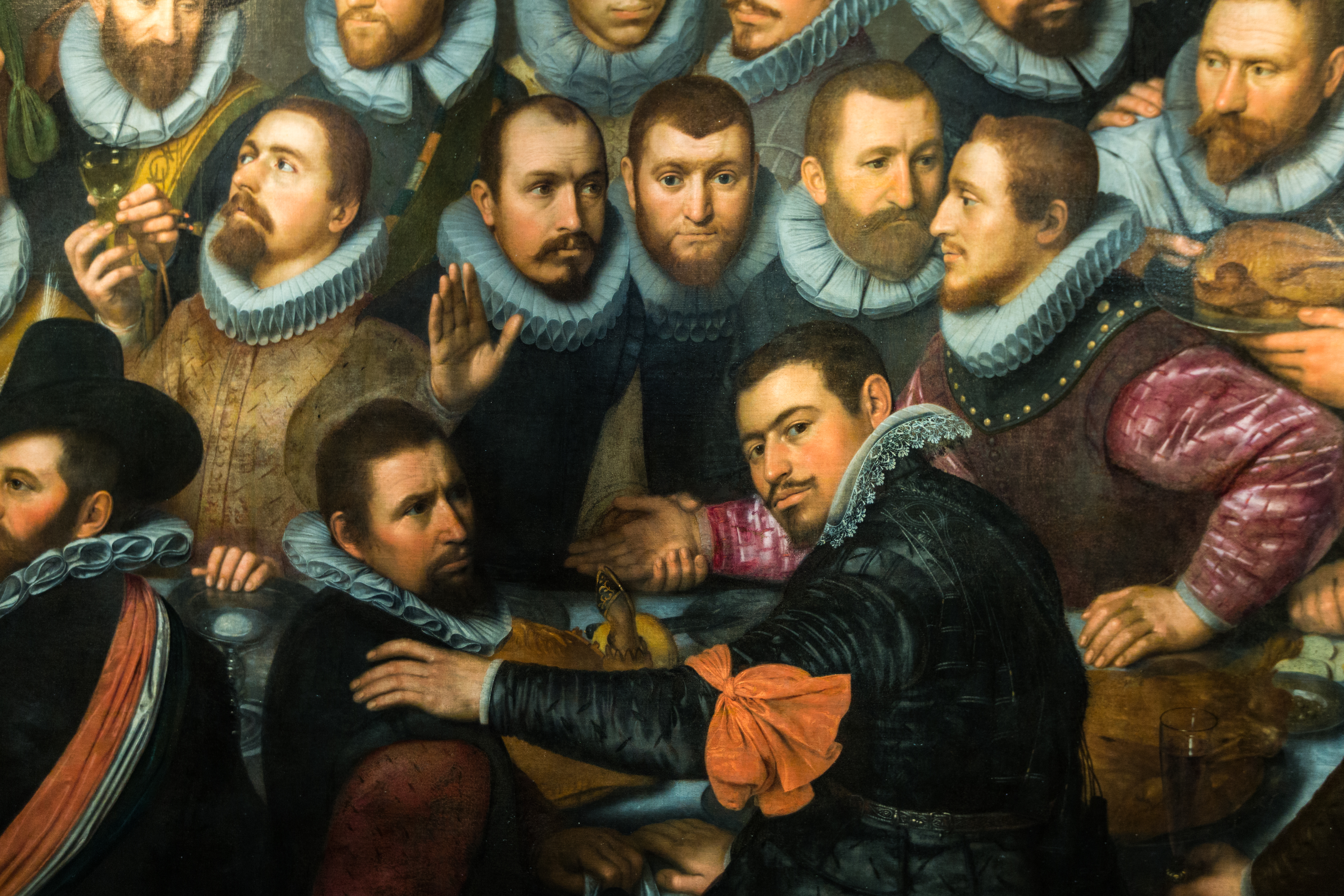

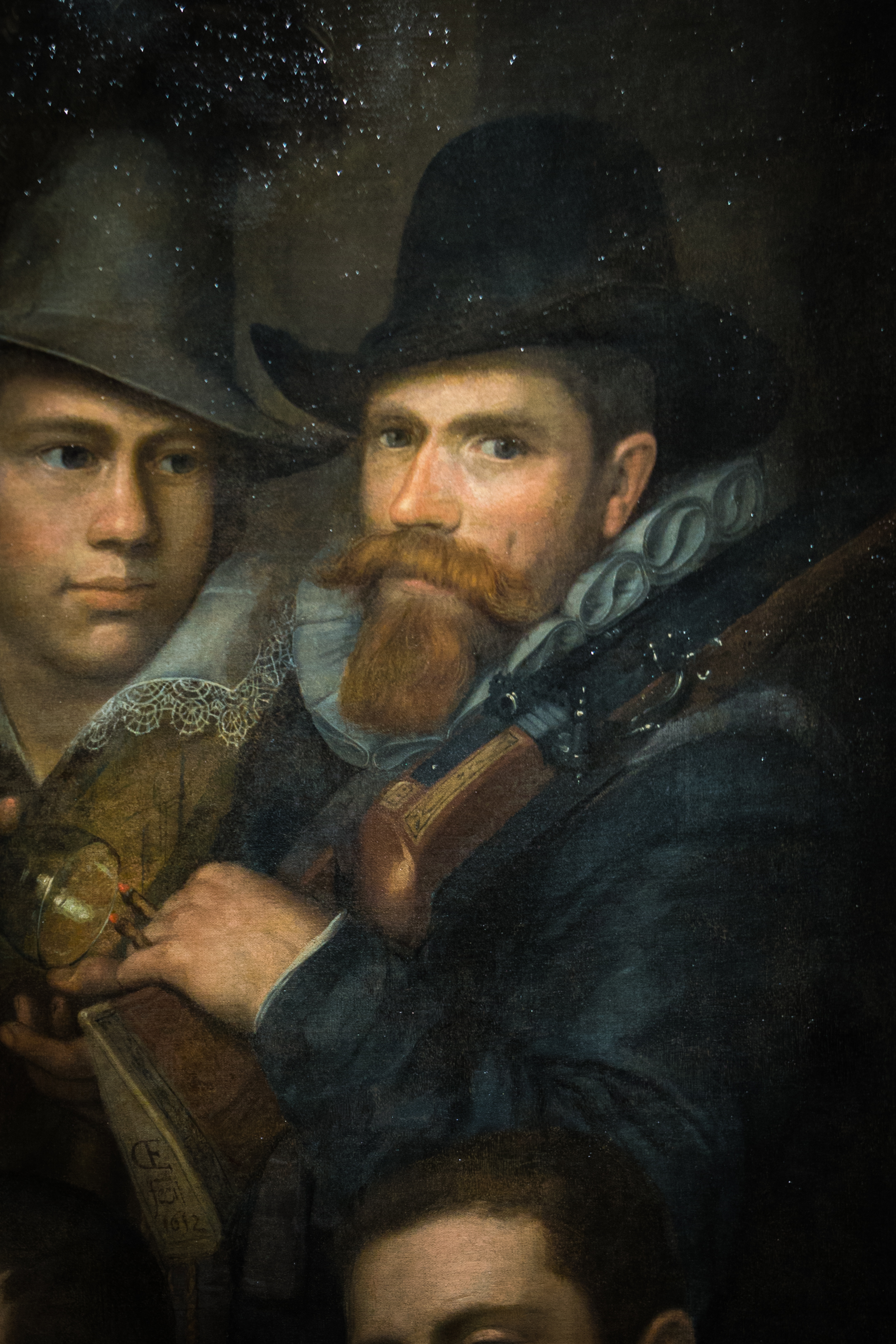
Supposed self-portrait
