= Cornelis Engelsz =

Dutch Golden Age painter (1575–1650)

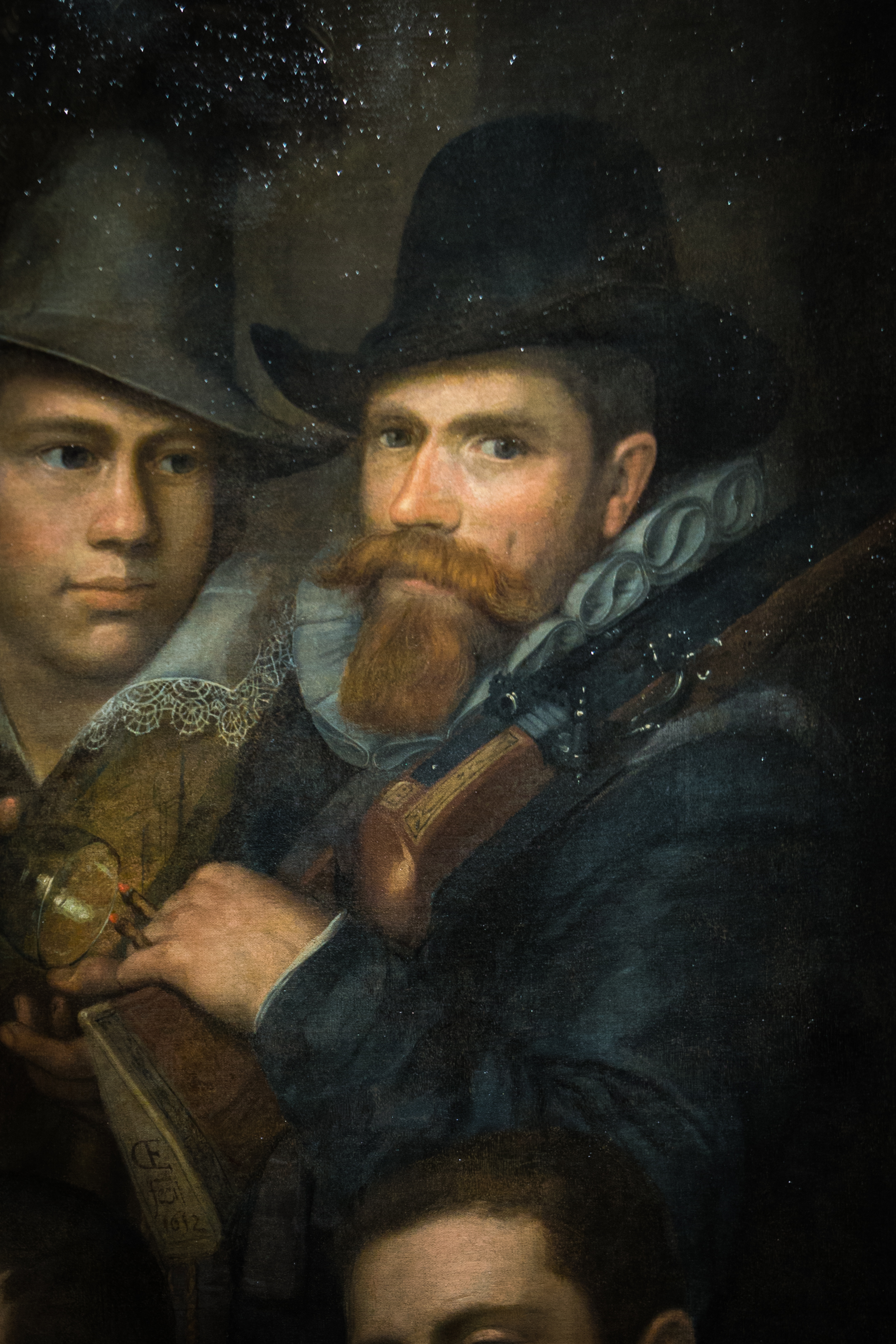
Presumed selfportrait of Cornelis Engelsz, 1612 – Coll. of Musée des Beaux-Arts de Strasbourg

Cornelis Engelsz (1575–1650) was a Dutch Golden Age painter and the father of Johannes Cornelisz Verspronck.

== Biography ==
Engelsz was born in Gouda. According to Houbraken, he was a pupil of Karel van Mander and a colleague of Frans Hals in Haarlem.

The Frans Hals Museum has several works by him and his son, the portrait painter Johannes Cornelisz Verspronck. According to the RKD he was a pupil of Cornelis Cornelisz and he became a member of the Haarlem Guild of St. Luke in 1593 and was from 1594 to 1621 a member of the schutterij there that he painted in 1618. He died in Haarlem.

== Works ==
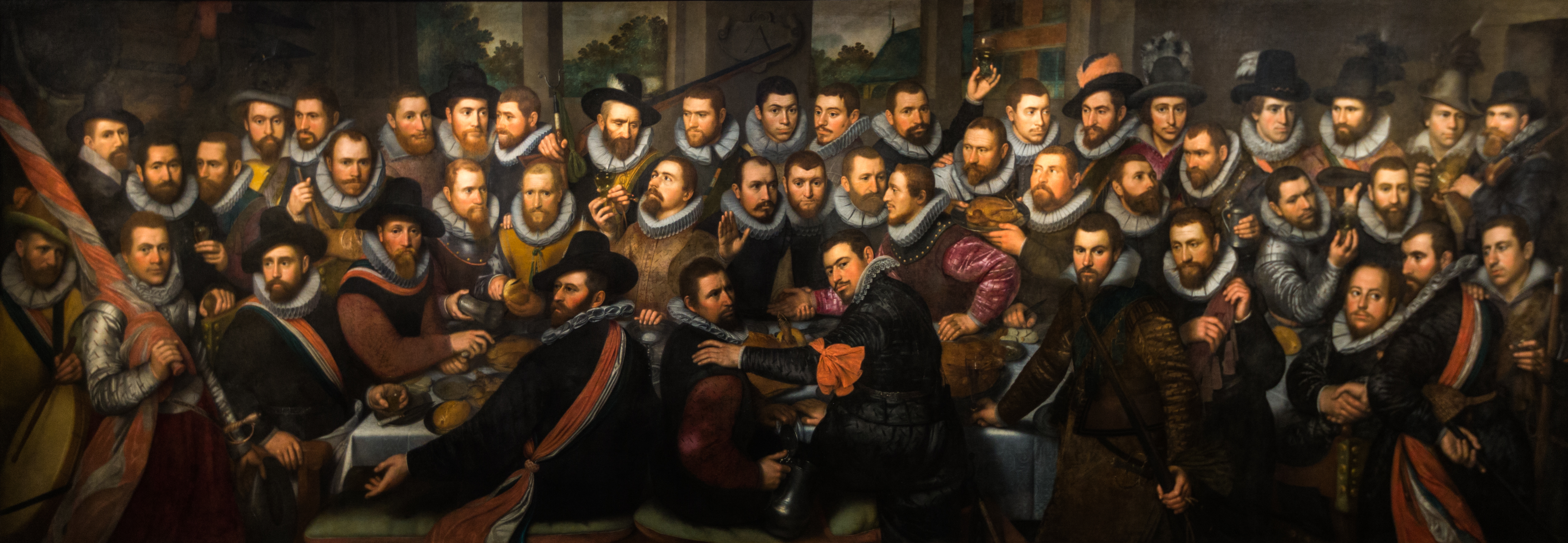
The St Adrian Civic Guard – 1612
– Collection of Musée des Beaux-Arts de Strasbourg

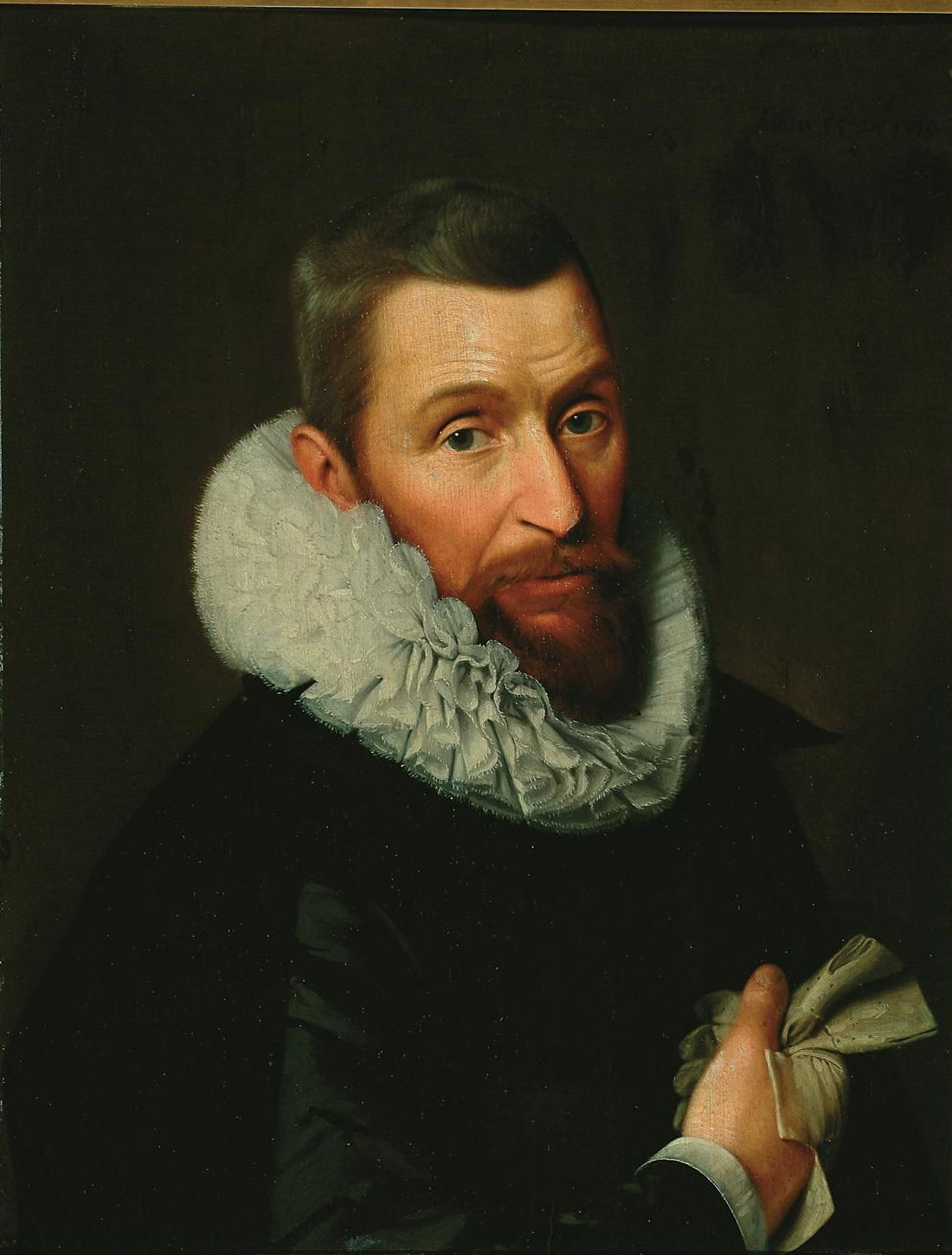
Portret van Floris van Schoterbosch, 1618

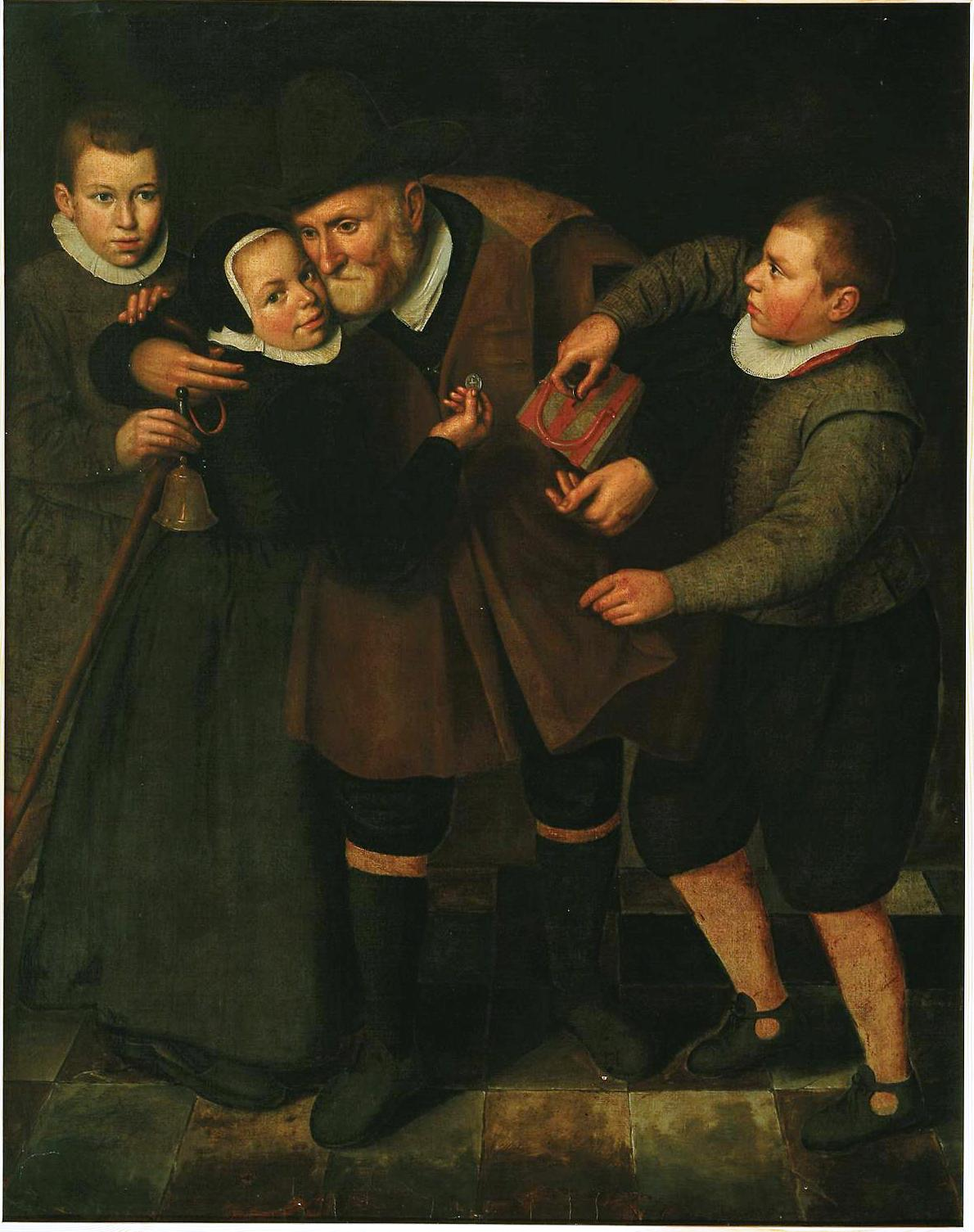
Old man accepting alms
