= Sidsel Ulfstand =

Danish landholder and county administrator

Sidsel Ulfstand (died 1575), was a Danish (Scanian) landholder and county administrator.

She was the daughter of the Riksråd Jens Holgersen Ulfstand (d. 1523) and Margrethe Arvidsdatter Trolle (1475–1522) and married in ca 1532 to riksråd Knud Pedersen Gyldenstierne (1480–1552).

She inherited the estates Ljungby in Scania, Tim in Nørrejylland and Bønnet on Falster. As a widow, she inherited the position of county administrator at Villand county in Scania, which was confirmed by royal decree in 1554. As county administrator, she lent the crown money during the war of 1563-1570 against security of Ramsø and Tune parish on Sjælland; during the war, she equipped the Danish army, managed the enlisting of soldiers, collected taxes and maintained roads, bridges and fortresses. She was often seen at the royal court, where she was one of the artists behind the tapestry of the royal hall (1559) and had the official task of making the underwear and shirts of the King (1565). She was regarded with great respect, and it was noted that she upheld a strict control of the vicars in the parishes under her command.
