= Francesco Cavazzoni =

Italian painter

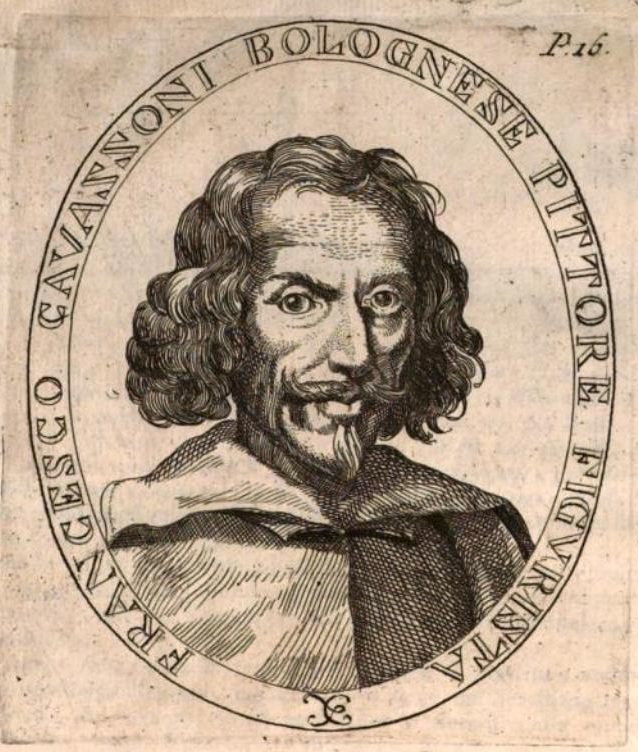
Francesco Cavaszone

Francesco Cavazzone (1559–1612) was an Italian painter of the early-Baroque period. He trained with Ludovico Carracci and Bartolomeo Passarotti. He completed a Christ preaching to the Magdalen for the Maddalena in Bologna. He also wrote art history.
