= Alessandro Aretusi =

Italian painter

Alessandro Aretusi was an Italian portrait painter of the 17th century from Modena, active in Florence painting for the court of the Grand Dukes.
