= Cesare Aretusi =

Italian painter

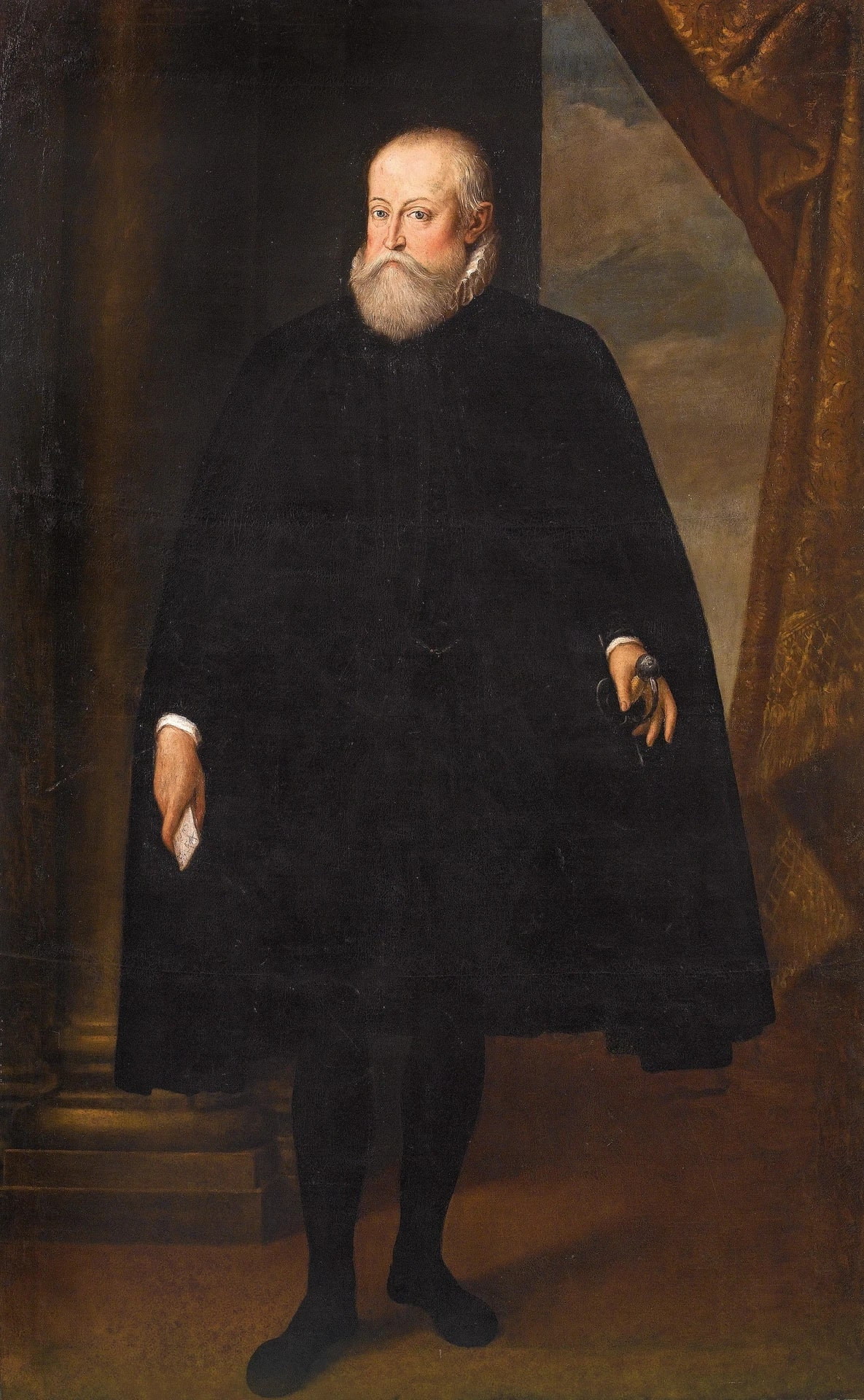
Cesare Aretusi, Portrait of Alfonso II d'Este

Cesare Aretusi (1 September 1549 – 4 October 1612) was an Italian painter of the late-Renaissance period.

He was born in Modena and trained with Bartolomeo Ramenghi (Bagnacavallo). Known primarily as a portrait painter, Aretusi also painted the cupola of the cathedral of St. Peter in Bologna, where he was assisted by Giovanni Battista Fiorini. Luigi Lanzi describes Aretusi as the better colorist and Fiorini as the better designer. Aretusi restored the frescoes of Correggio for the tribune of the Cathedral of Parma, and made a copy of the famous La Notte painting by Correggio for the church of San Giovanni Evangelista in Parma. He died in 1612 in Parma.

The relationship of Cesare to the Modenese painters with the same surname, Pellegrino from the early 16th century or Alessandro Aretusi from the 17th, is unclear. Lanzi speculates he may have been the son of Pellegrino Aretusi.
