= Teylers astronomical observatory =

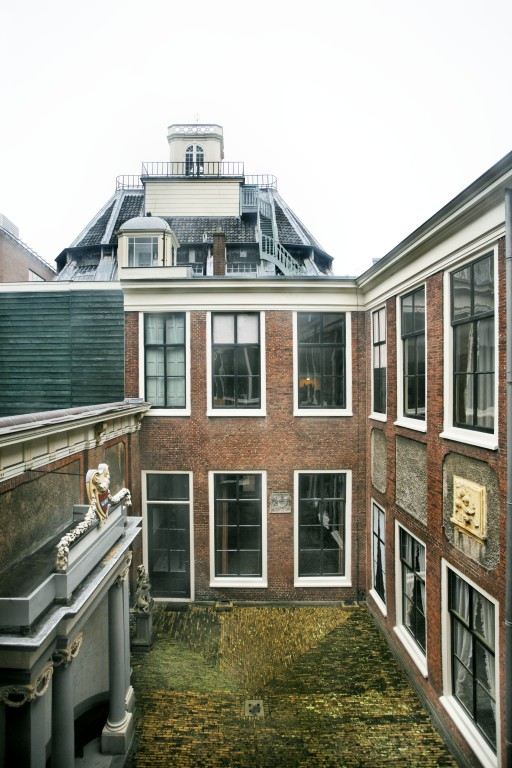
Courtyard of Teylers Foundation House with the observatory on the roof of the Oval Room. Current situation.

The Teylers astronomical observatory (Dutch: Teylers Sterrenwacht) is an astronomical observatory built in 1784 on the roof of the Oval Room of the Teylers Museum in Haarlem.

== History ==
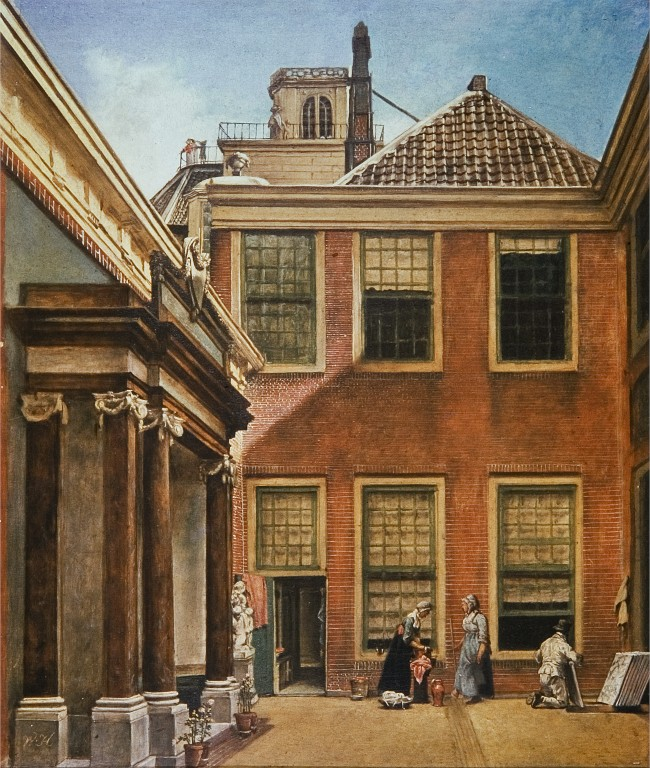
Wybrand Hendriks, Inner courtyard of Teylers Foundation House, Haarlem, 1800. Collection Teylers Museum. Hendriks' painting shows that museum visitors used the Observatory to view the panorama of Haarlem and its surroundings.

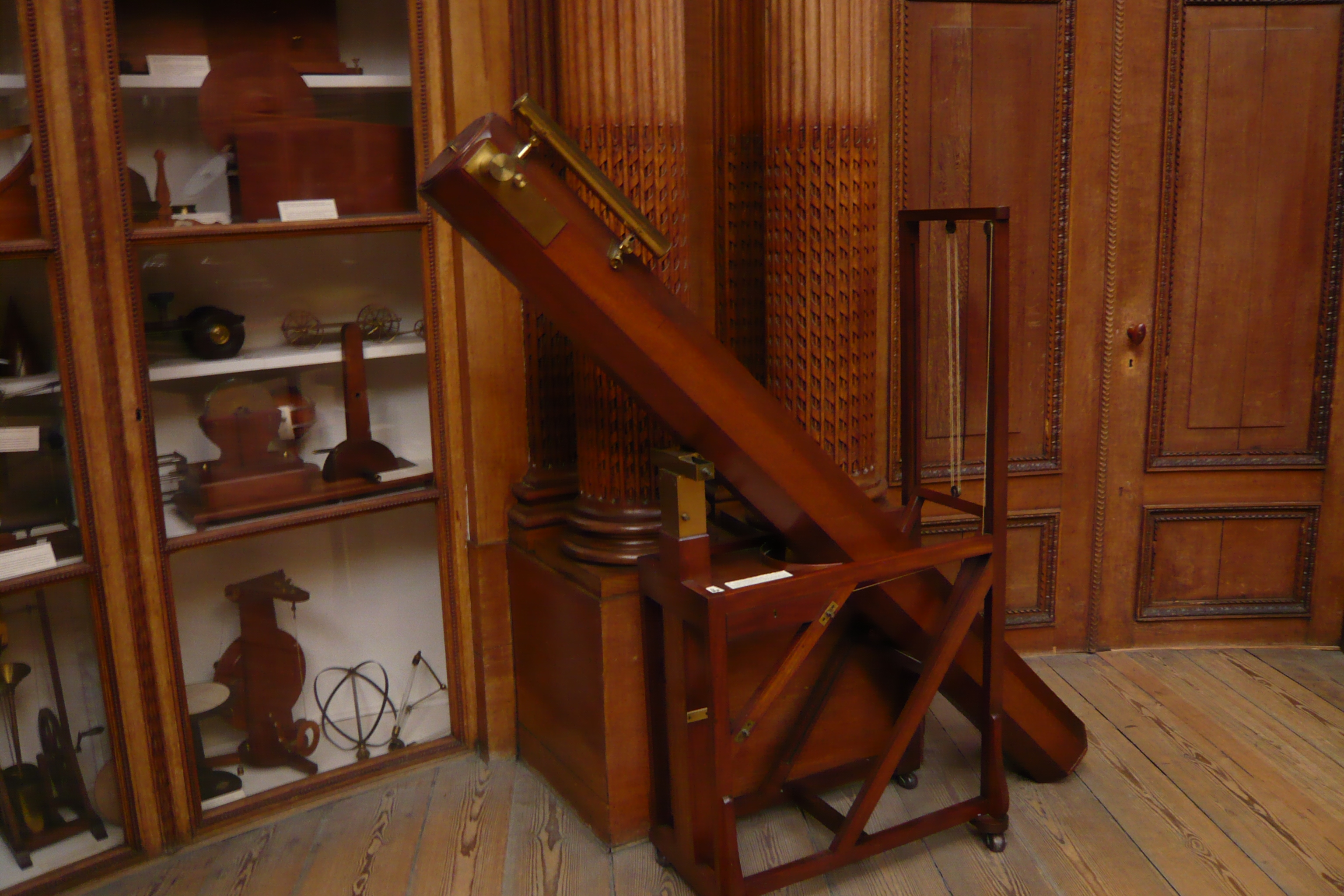
Reflecting telescope after Isaac Newton by William Herschel, built to order in 1790 and formerly used in the observatory

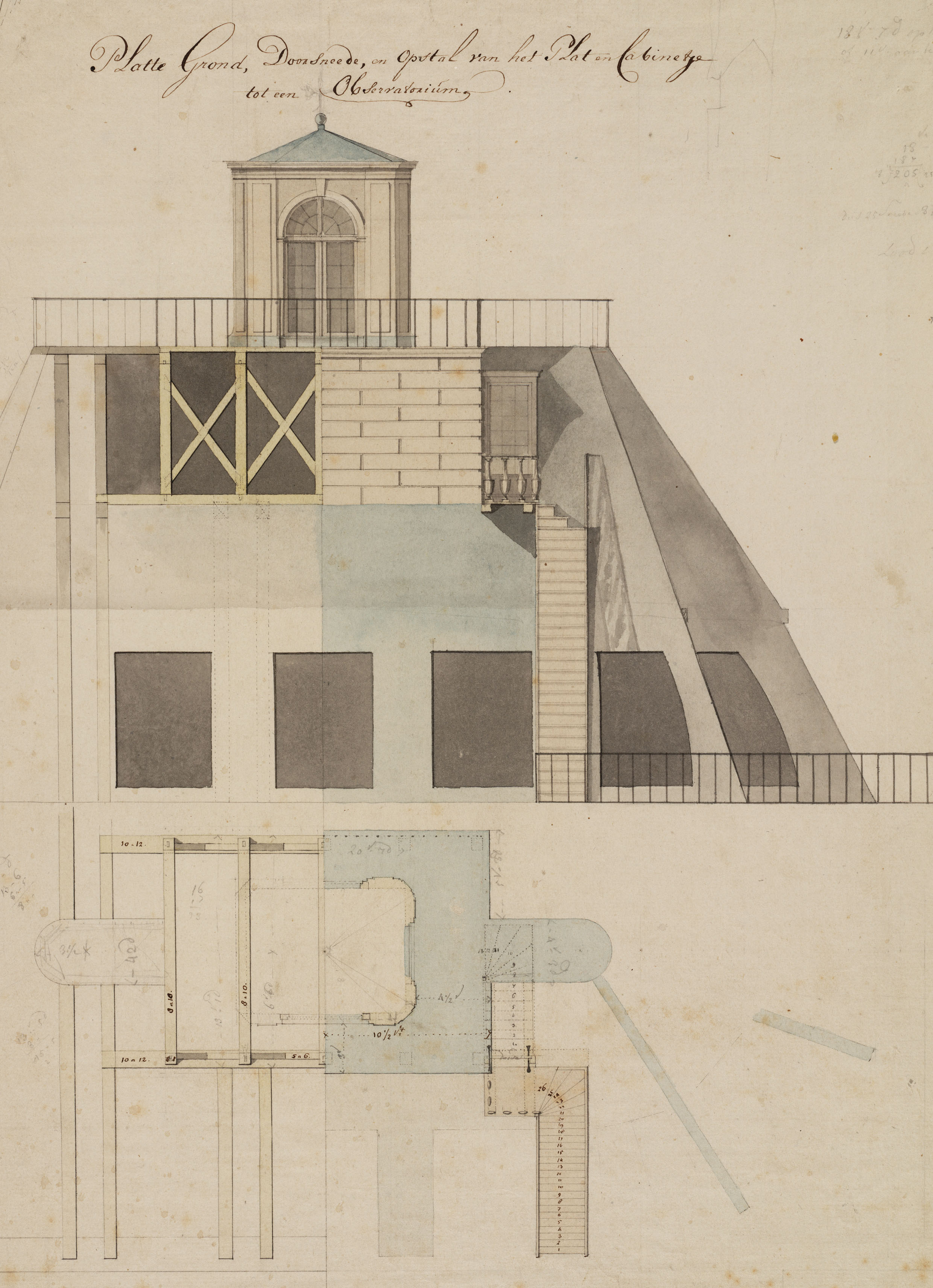
Leendert Viervant, Design for an observatory on the roof of the Oval Room of Teylers Museum, drawing, 498 × 374 mm.

The observatory was built on the suggestion of Jacobus Barnaart, one of the five initial directors of the Teylers Stichting, which was the foundation responsible for taking care of the inheritance of Pieter Teyler van der Hulst. Barnaart was an amateur scientist who had a great interest in astronomy and wanted to build a state-of-the-art astronomical observatory on the roof of the Oval Room. This proved to be a bad idea, because the roof was made of wood, which transfers too many vibrations to make reliable and precise observations. Hence a belvedere was built instead, a square tower with two doors in each wall.

Though the observatory couldn't be used for precision measurements, it was still used for manual observations. The collection of the Teylers physical cabinet contains several telescopes and other devices that were used. Until 1817 the observatory also had a camera obscura, which was used for drawings of the view from the little tower. Though they have not survived, the Teylers archives have evidence that Vincent Jansz van der Vinne was paid 86 guilders for painting the "walls and ceilings of the cupula". That was not the only artwork that early stargazers met with when they climbed the stairs. On the rooftop of the first staircase a vase was installed that was delivered by Jan Woortman in 1781. Though lost since, the vase can be seen in the painting of the courtyard of the Foundation house by Wybrand Hendriks. The vase was the trademark of Teyler, and is visible on the top of Van Marum's electrostatic generator as well.

The observatory can be reached via a staircase from the Grote Herenkamer (large board room), which is located next to the Oval Room. That staircase leads the visitor to the lower roof, where a steep open air wooden staircase leads to the small room on top of the dome. For precision measurements, a new observatorium was built in the garden, that was later used as a studio by the later curator Jan van Borssum Buisman.
