= Leendert Viervant the Younger =

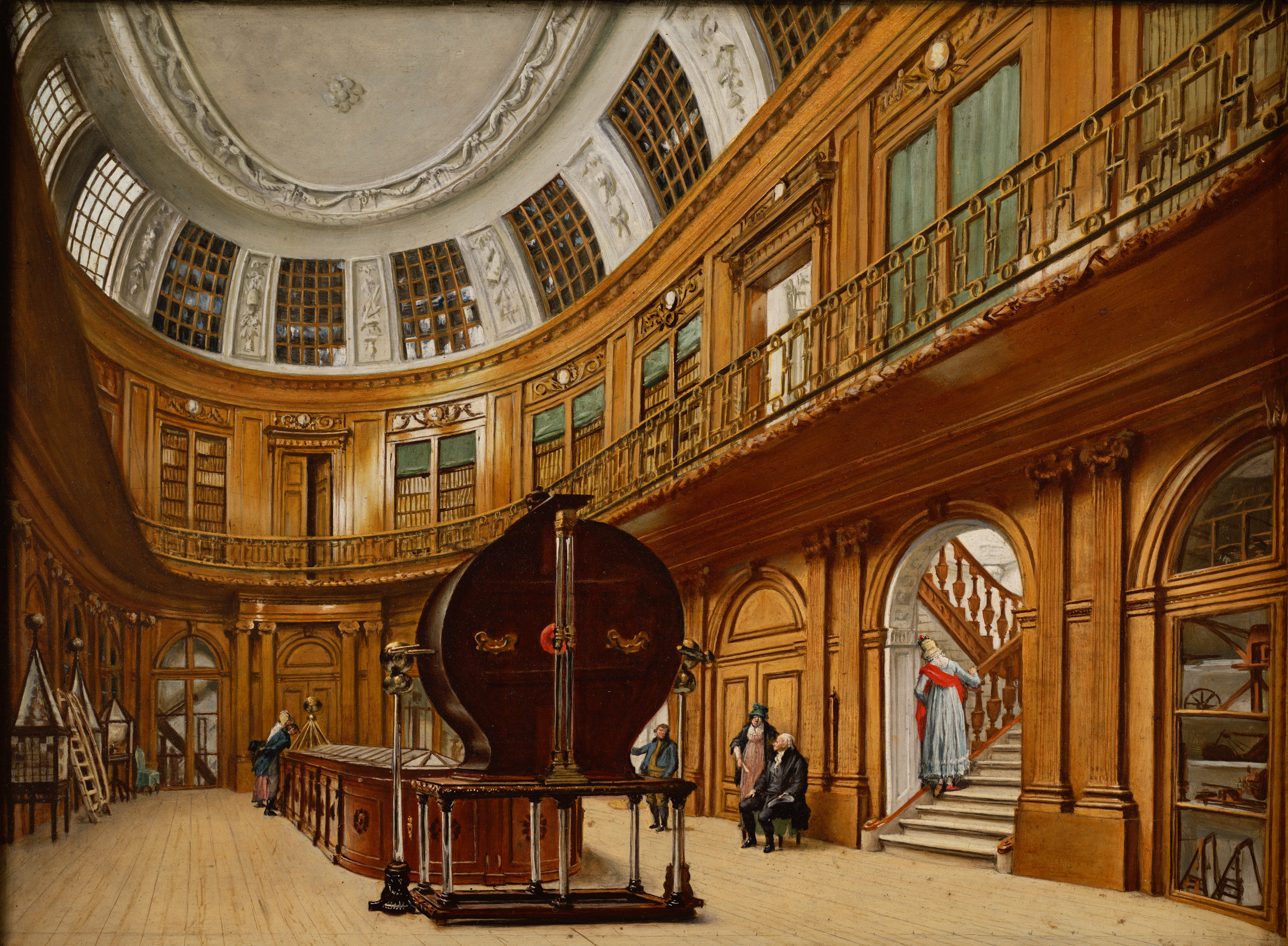
Painting by the museum art curator Wybrand Hendriks in 1800 of the famous Oval Room in Teyler's Museum, showing the elektriseermachine of Martin van Marum

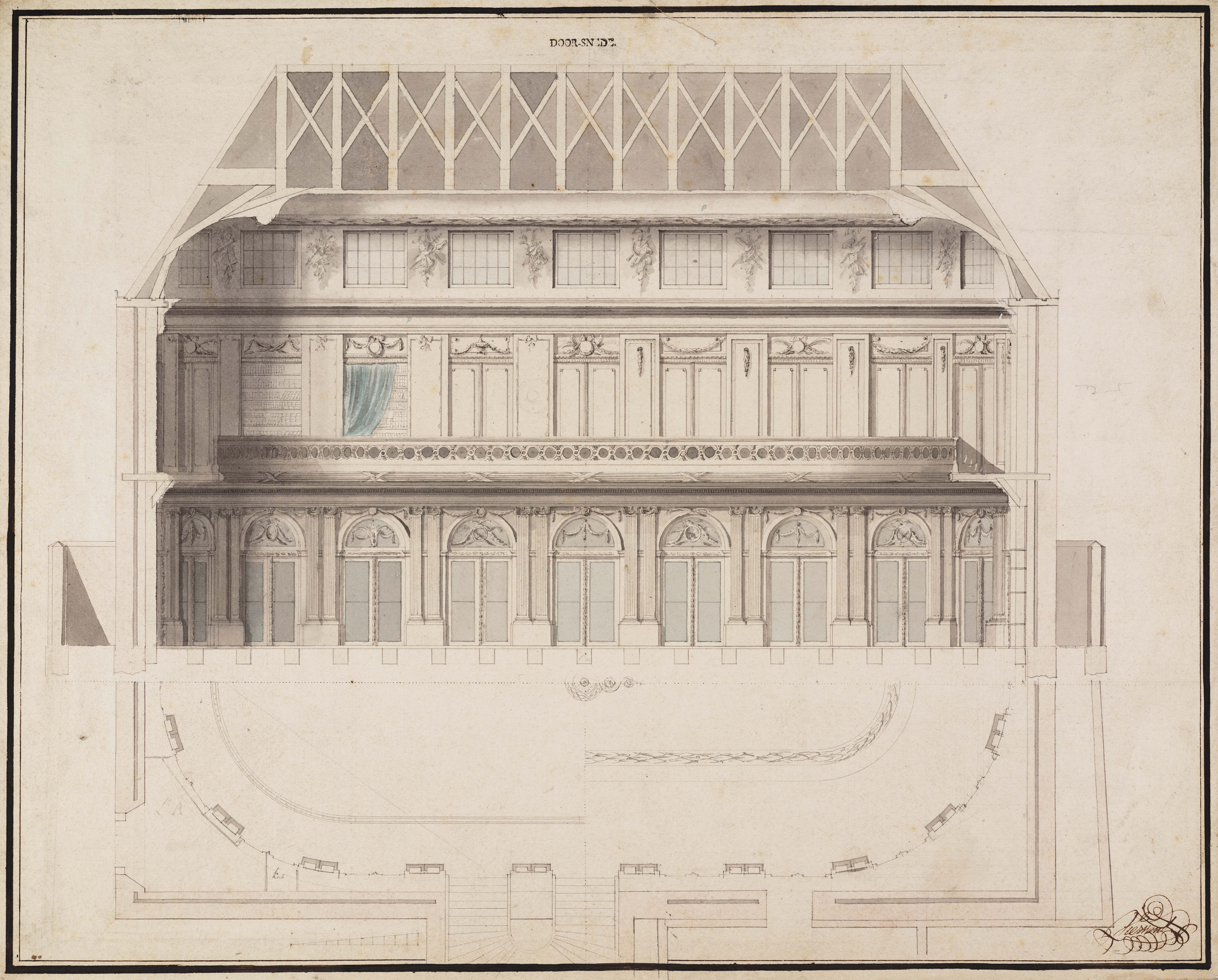
Leendert Viervant, Design for the Oval Room of Teylers Museum; 480 x 600 mm.

Leendert Viervant de Jonge (Leendert Viervant the Younger) (Arnhem, 5 March 1752 – 4 July 1801, Amsterdam), was a Dutch architect and cabinet builder.

Viervant stemmed from a family of architects, cabinet builders and stonemasons. His father, Hendrik Viervant, was the son of cabinet builder and stonemason Leendert Viervant the Elder and married Catharina Maria Otten, the sister of the neoclassical architect Jacob Otten Husly. Also Hendrik's brother, Anthonie Viervant, was a cabinet maker and Anthonie's son Roelof Viervant designed garden pavillons and facades. All these family members have designed some buildings in 18th century Netherlands.

Thanks to his family background, Viervant had a good basis to work from. Born and raised in the provincial city of Arnhem, he studied to become an architect with his uncle Husly. In 1768 he was entered into the stonemason guild of Amsterdam, where he lived and worked. He lived at the Amstel and later near Hoge Sluis (1784–1790). In 1791 he was forced to let his inventory be liquidated, because he couldn't fulfill his financial obligations any longer – finally he was able to come to arrangements with his creditors. According to his uncle Husly, Viervant couldn't handle money, and he lived a wild life. In 1798 he became one of the three directors at the City and Public Works Department of the City Amsterdam, after his predecessor had to leave because of his support of the Orange family (this was between the revolution and the inclusion in the French Empire).

== Work ==
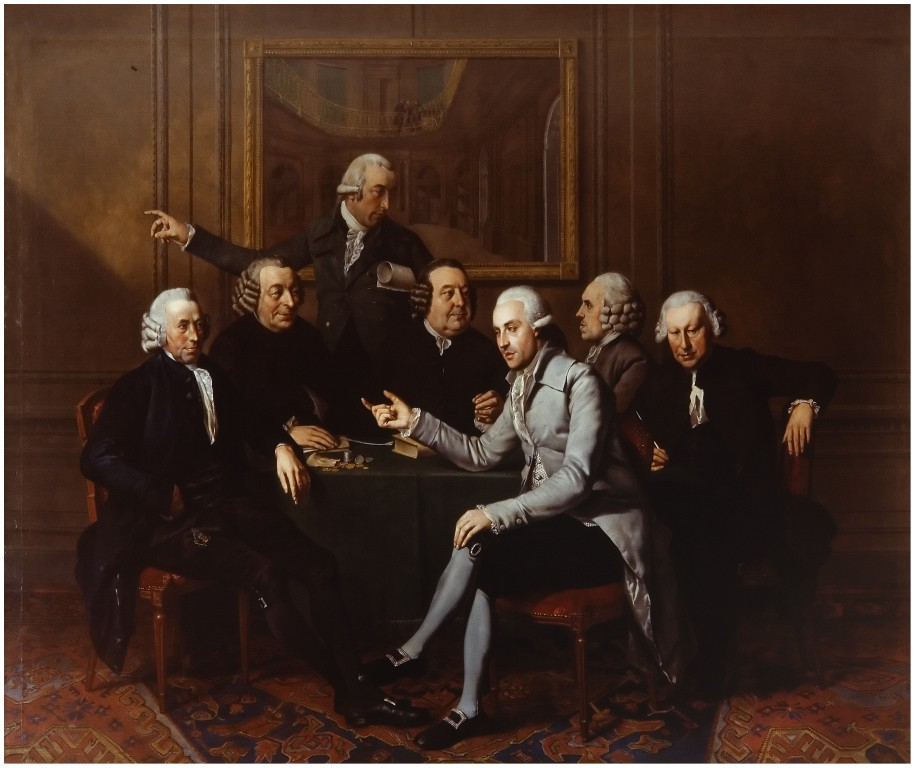
Wybrand Hendriks, Group portrait of the Board of Teylers Foundation, with their secretary and the architect Leendert Viervant, 1786, oil on canvas; 311 x 258 cm. The standing figure at the back is Leendert Viervant.

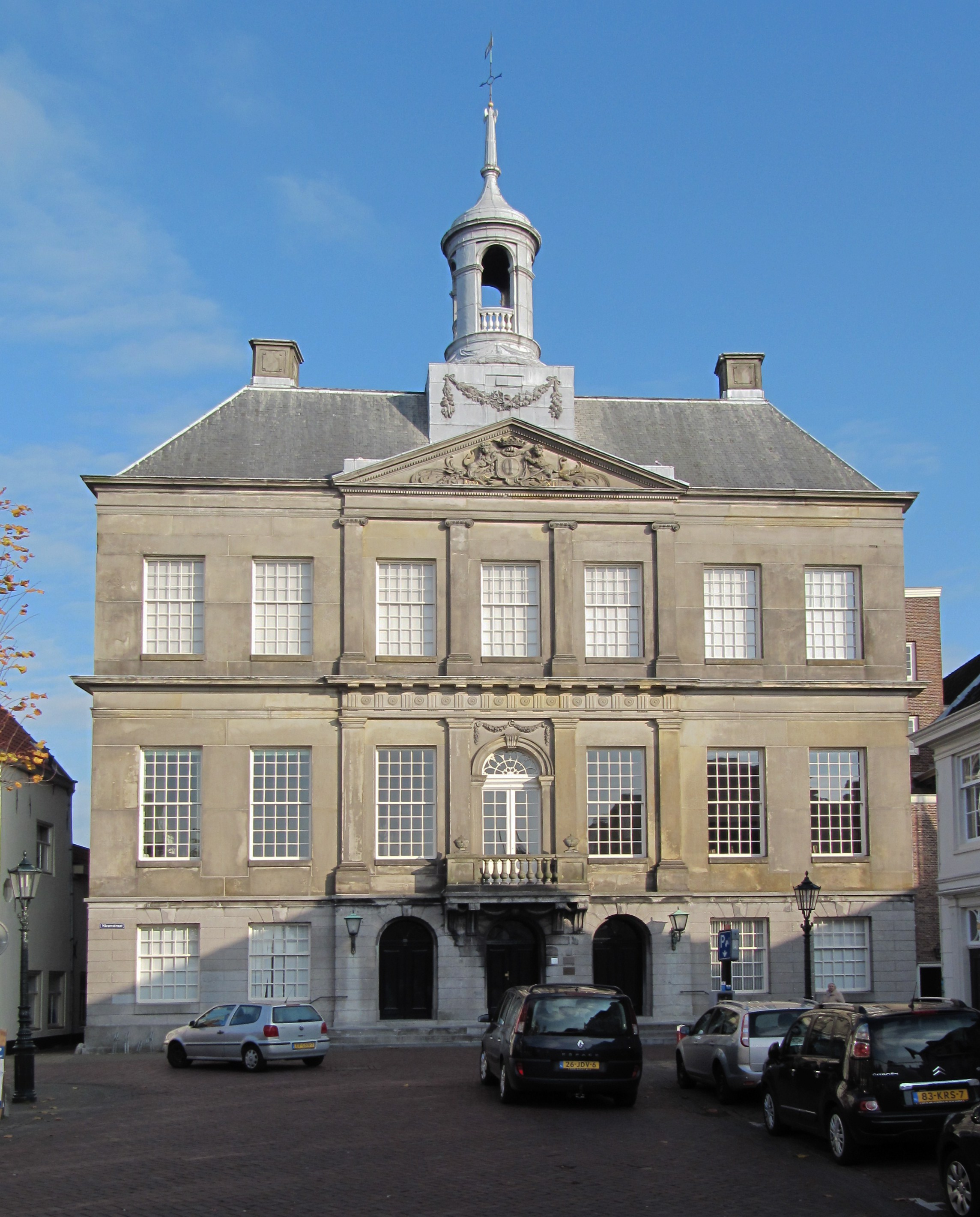
The town hall of Weesp, one of Leendert Viervant the Younger's designs

Viervant was the architect of several buildings throughout the Netherlands. He was taught by his uncle Husly, and had a for that period typical neoclassical style. Short after his entry in the stonemason guild of Amsterdam in 1768, he got an assignment by the churchmasters of the Oude Kerk (Old Church) for a 'Bardiglio Marmere schoosteenmantel met holle stijlen en ornament in het midden voor f 180 (a Bardiglio marmer chimney mantel with hollow styles and an ornament in the middle for 180 guilders). From 1772 to 1776 he worked on the town hall of Weesp. In 1779 he is asked by the Teylers Stichting to design the Oval Room, the Teylers astronomical observatory and a significant part of the interior of the Teylers Museum (works began in 1784). Here he could also use his family background of cabinet makers, designing amongst others the cabinets in the Oval Room and the lower part of the Big Electrostatic generator. In his works on the Teylers Museum, he based himself amongst others on work of the architects François de Neufforge, Michelangelo and Artus Quellinus. Viervant received some 9500 guilders, and was with that amount probably one of the best paid architects in the Netherlands at the time. His uncle Husly designed several of the ceiling decorations in the Oval Room. He also works on other projects for this foundation, including the Teylers Hofje, all in Haarlem. In the Regents' Room of Teylers Hofje, there is a large group portrait by Wybrand Hendriks, showing the first five Directors of Teylers Stichting sitting around a table, together with their accountant Koenraad Hovens and their architect: Leendert Viervant.

In 1787 he designed the current Kalverstraat 8 for the patriotic society, but the building was stopped soon because the society was abolished. This does however show his involvement with the patriotic circles, which would later make him director of the City and Public Works Department. Also Viervant is believed to be the designer of the south entrance of the Oude Kerk in Amsterdam.
