= Fundatiehuis (Teyler) =

Coordinates: 52°22′49″N 4°38′21″E

Teylers Museum rooms

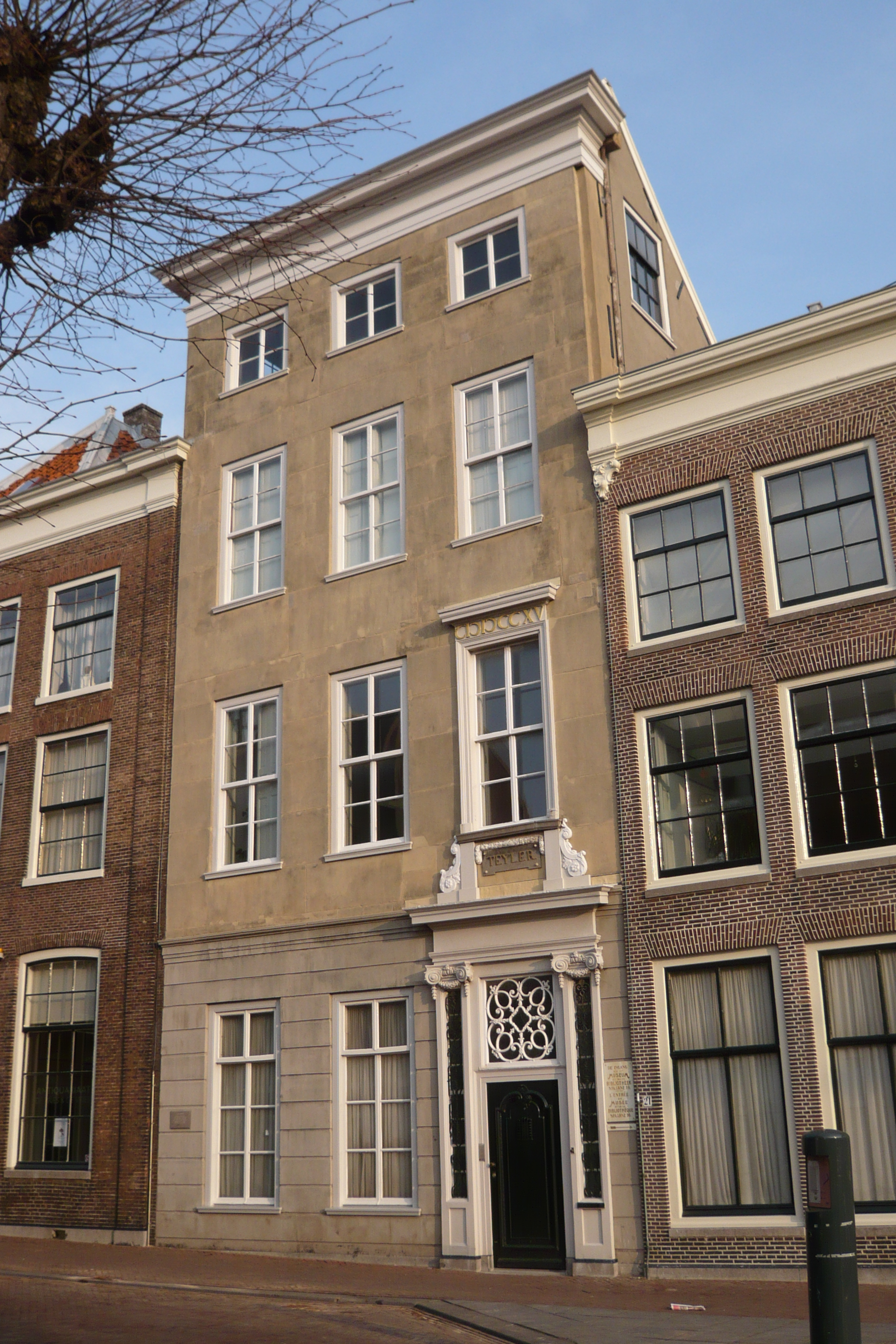
Until the Spaarne wing was built in 1885, access to the Oval Room was gained through the front door of his Fundatiehuis. On either side of it, the same Ionic capitals were installed as in the Oval Room -giving visitors a foretaste of the architecture they would find inside.

The Fundatiehuis (English: Foundation House) is the former family home of Pieter Teyler van der Hulst on the Damstraat 21 in Haarlem, Netherlands. After his death it became the seat of the Teylers Stichting and through its front door, visitors could reach the Oval room.

== History ==
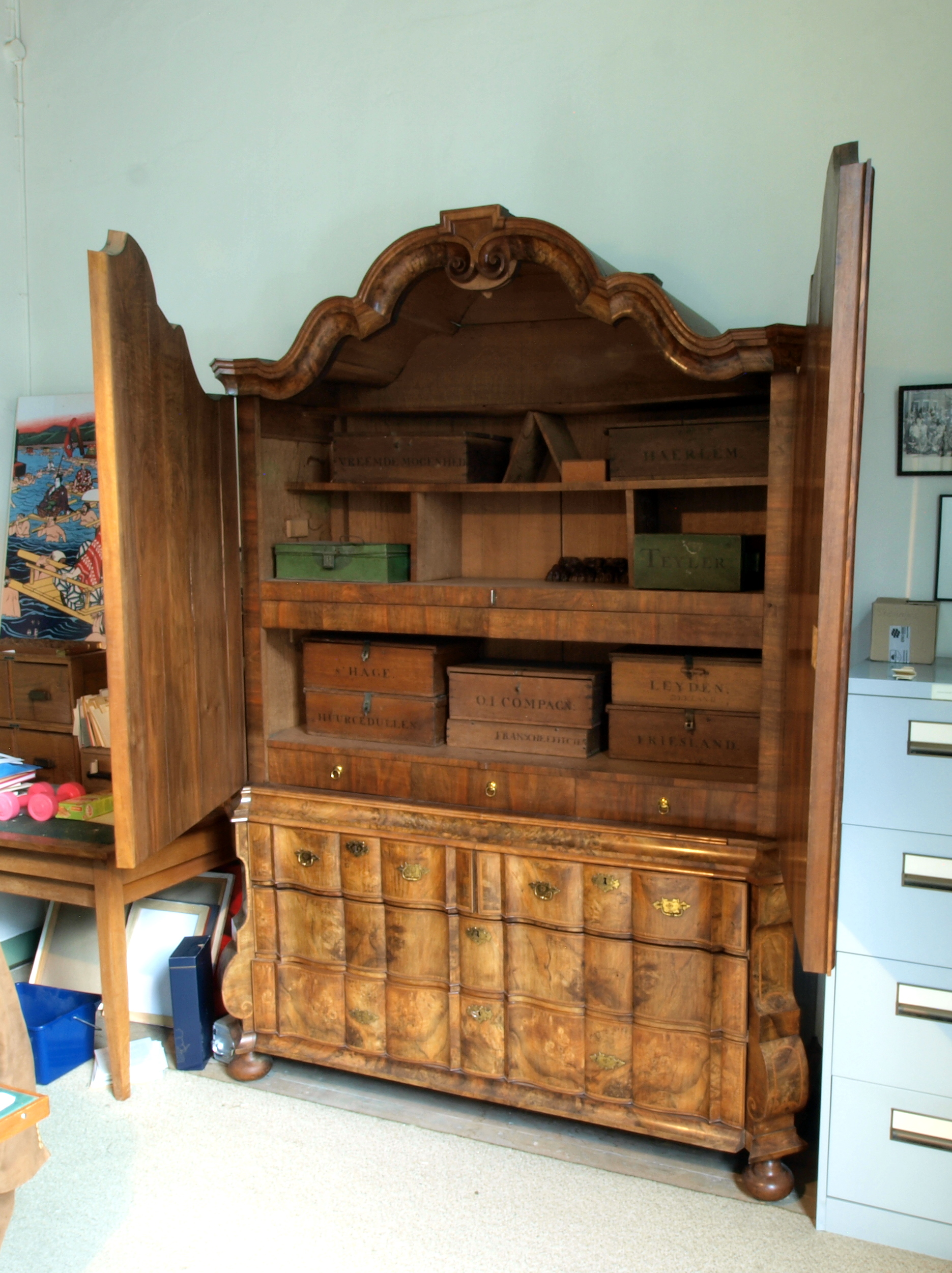
Original cabinet containing the banker's possessions in Teyler's "comptoir".

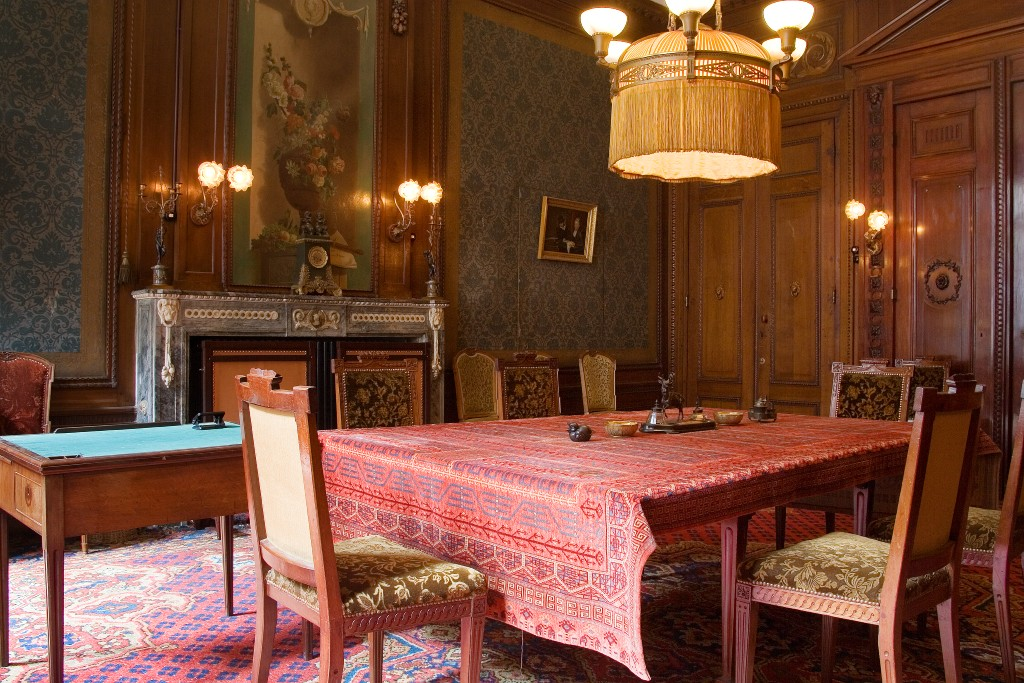
The 'Grote Herenkamer' (Large Boardroom) in the room behind the courtyard adjoining the Oval room. Decorated in neoclassical style by Leendert Viervant the Younger in 1782. This room was used for Board meetings of Teylers Stichting. Above the fireplace a flower painting by Wybrand Hendriks has been installed.

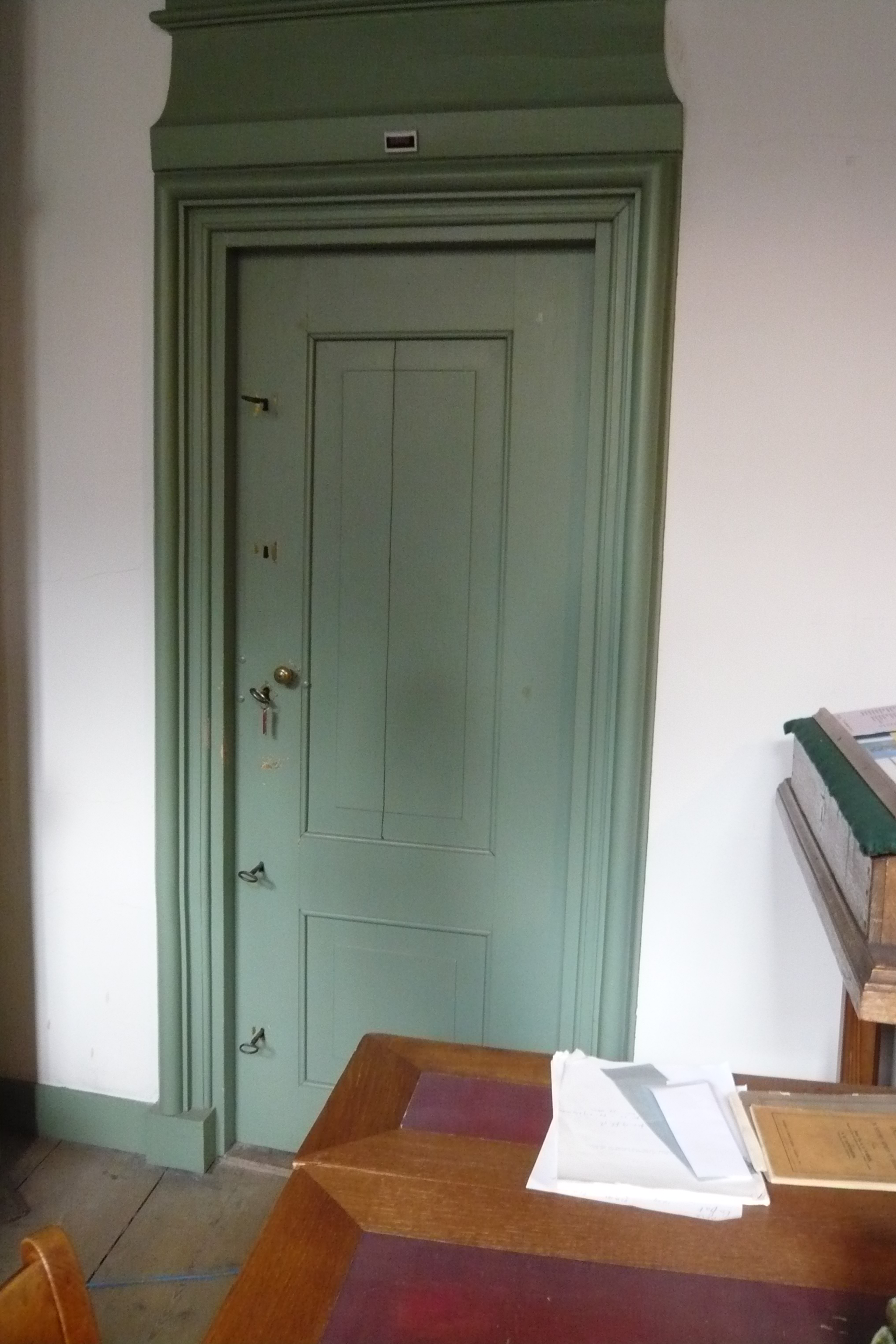
Door with five locks

The Teyler legacy to the city of Haarlem is known today as the Teylers Museum, but in 1788 it was composed of two societies: Teylers First or Theological Society (Dutch: Teylers Eerste of Godgeleerd Genootschap), intended for the study of religion and Teylers Second Society (Dutch: Teylers Tweede Genootschap), which was to concern itself with physics, poetry, history, drawing and numismatics. The caretakers had to meet in the gentleman's room of the fundatiehuis weekly, and each society had five caretakers, so all of the gentlemen involved lived in Haarlem. From Teyler's death onwards, it was the home of the artist in residence, one of Teyler's many rules for the management of his estate. The first inhabitant after Pieter teyler died, was the local artist Vincent Jansz van der Vinne.

=== History of the building ===
The building was built in 1715 for the wealthy commissioner of the Haarlem City Justice department, Hendrik Adriaan van der Marck. Van der Marck had a large library and when he died in 1740 Teyler bought the house in order to have more room for his growing library and collection of curiosities and stuffed birds. Teyler moved in with his wife, and they lived together there for 14 years until she died in 1754. The Teylers did not seem to take great pains to remodel the house, as the plaster work in the hallway downstairs still shows the Van der Marck family coat of arms. Upstairs in a back room, Teyler kept office (comptoir) as a banker, and this office still has the original cabinet with his banker archive. Two years after his wife died Teyler drew up his will with the intention of preserving the house as a gift to the city, though he himself lived for another 22 years.

== After Teyler's death ==
The long hallway has the function of dividing the house in two, and the Teylers Stichting has used the various ground floor rooms for the location of the library and the meeting rooms for the directors, the religious society and the science society. The room at the back of the garden was used for member meetings. After the Oval Room was built, visitors could pass along the hallway through the meeting room to the Oval room. The old office used by Teyler himself became the office of the curator, and two smaller adjacent rooms with doors contain 3 and 5 locks, one for the Teylers Stichting and one for the science society, which held Teyler's coin and medal collection, the most valuable part of the collection on Teyler's death. The room with 3 locks could only be opened when all three key owners were present, and the room with 5 locks could only be opened when 3 of 5 keyholders were present. Considering the complicated lock system, there was clearly reason to fear theft of the items in the medal collection and in the early days the collection was only available by appointment.
