= Teylers Oval Room =

Room in the Teylers Museum in the Netherlands

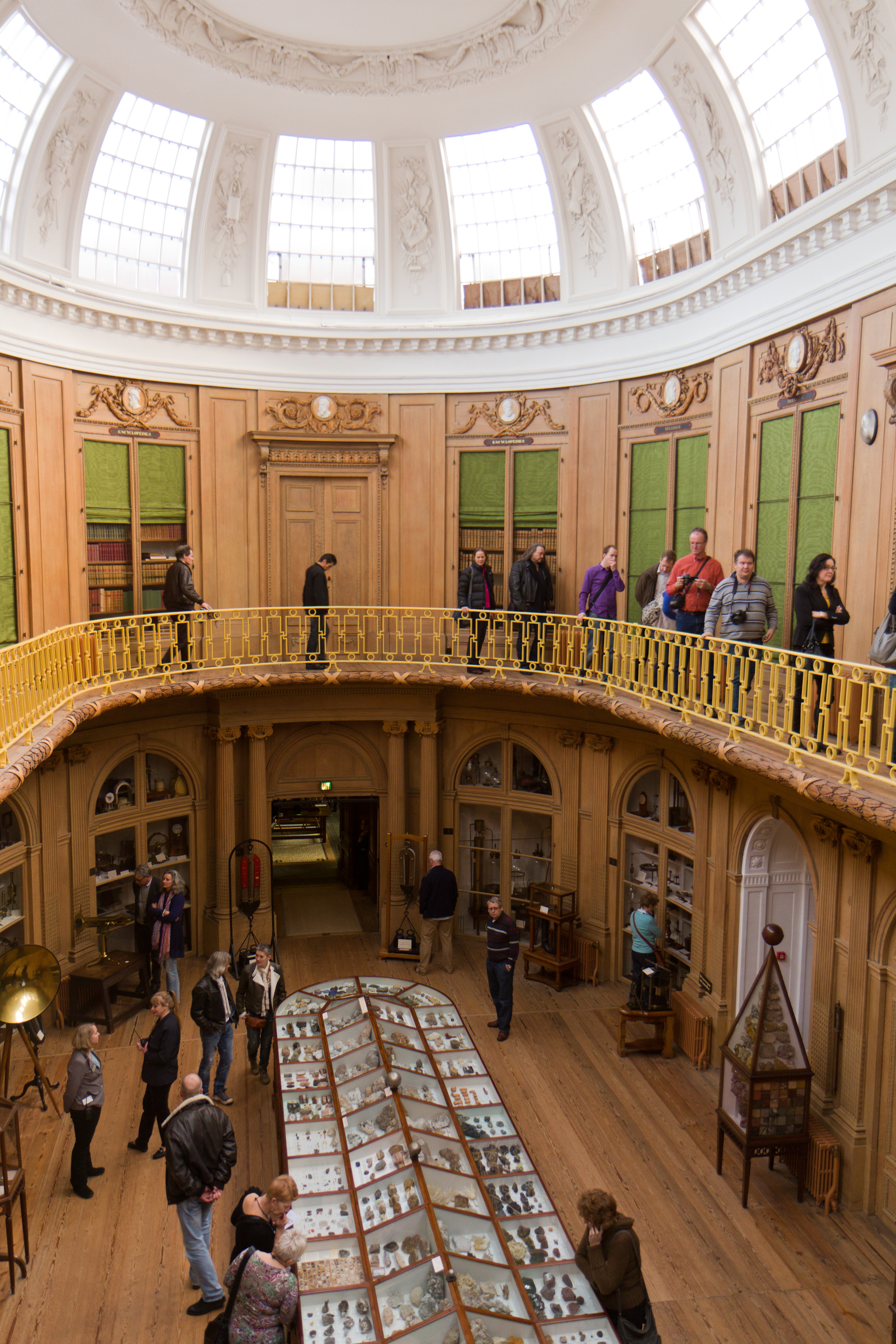
Picture taken during a rare tour of the gallery

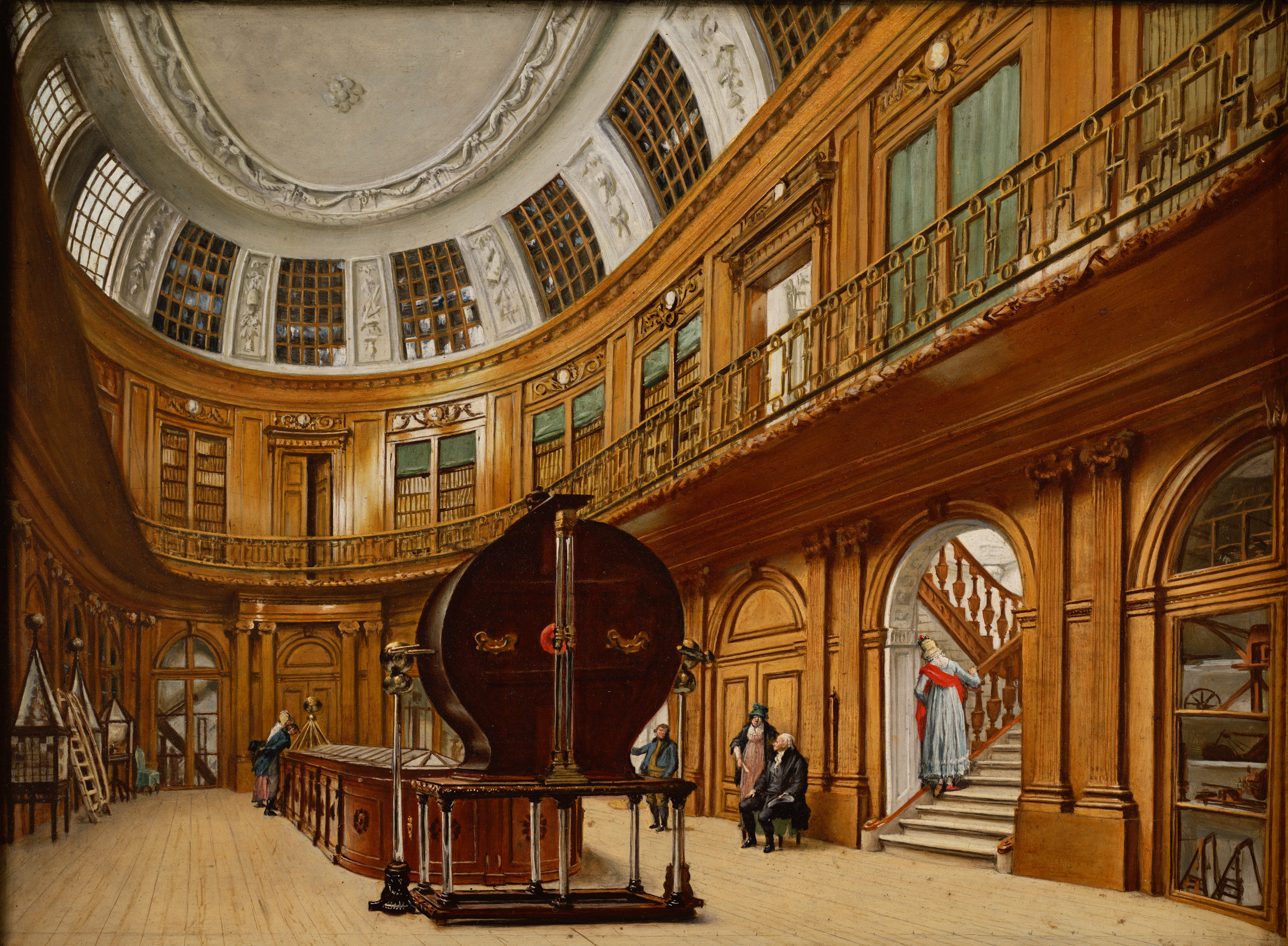
Painting by the museum art curator Wybrand Hendriks in 1800 of the interior of the Oval Room, showing the elektriseermachine of Martin van Marum

The Oval Room in the Teylers Museum was the first part of the museum (though it was not called a museum yet) that was opened in 1784. It could be entered through the garden of the fundatiehuis, the former home of Pieter Teyler van der Hulst. The building has an oval shape built around its centerpiece, a mineralogical cabinet. The Oval Room consists of two floors; the ground floor with its display cabinets and a gallery of books that connects to the Teylers Library. On top of the room, on the roof, the astronomical observatory used to be a landmark that could be seen for miles along the river Spaarne. The gallery and observatory are longer accessible to the public, though the gallery can be seen from the ground floor.

== History ==
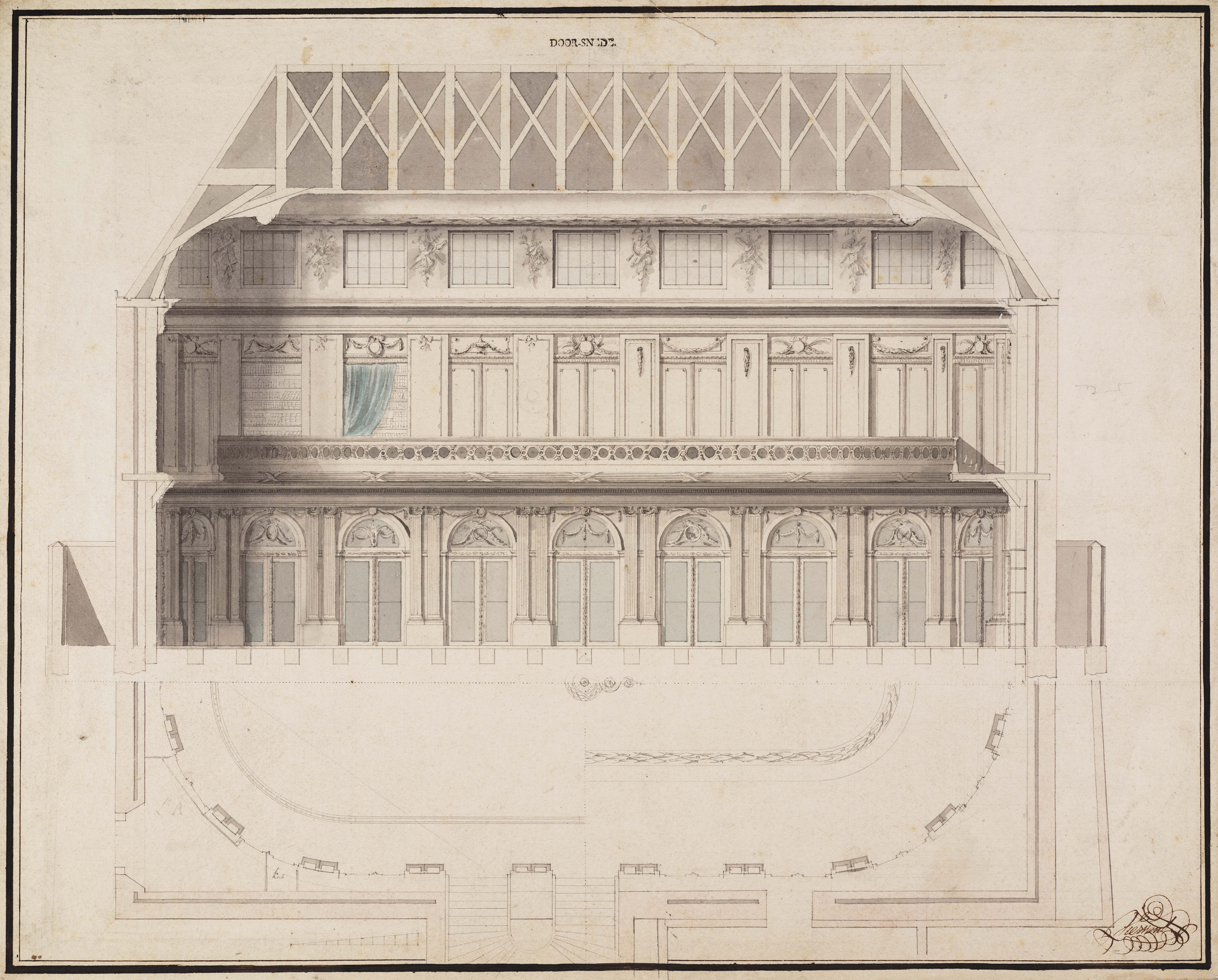
design by Viervant

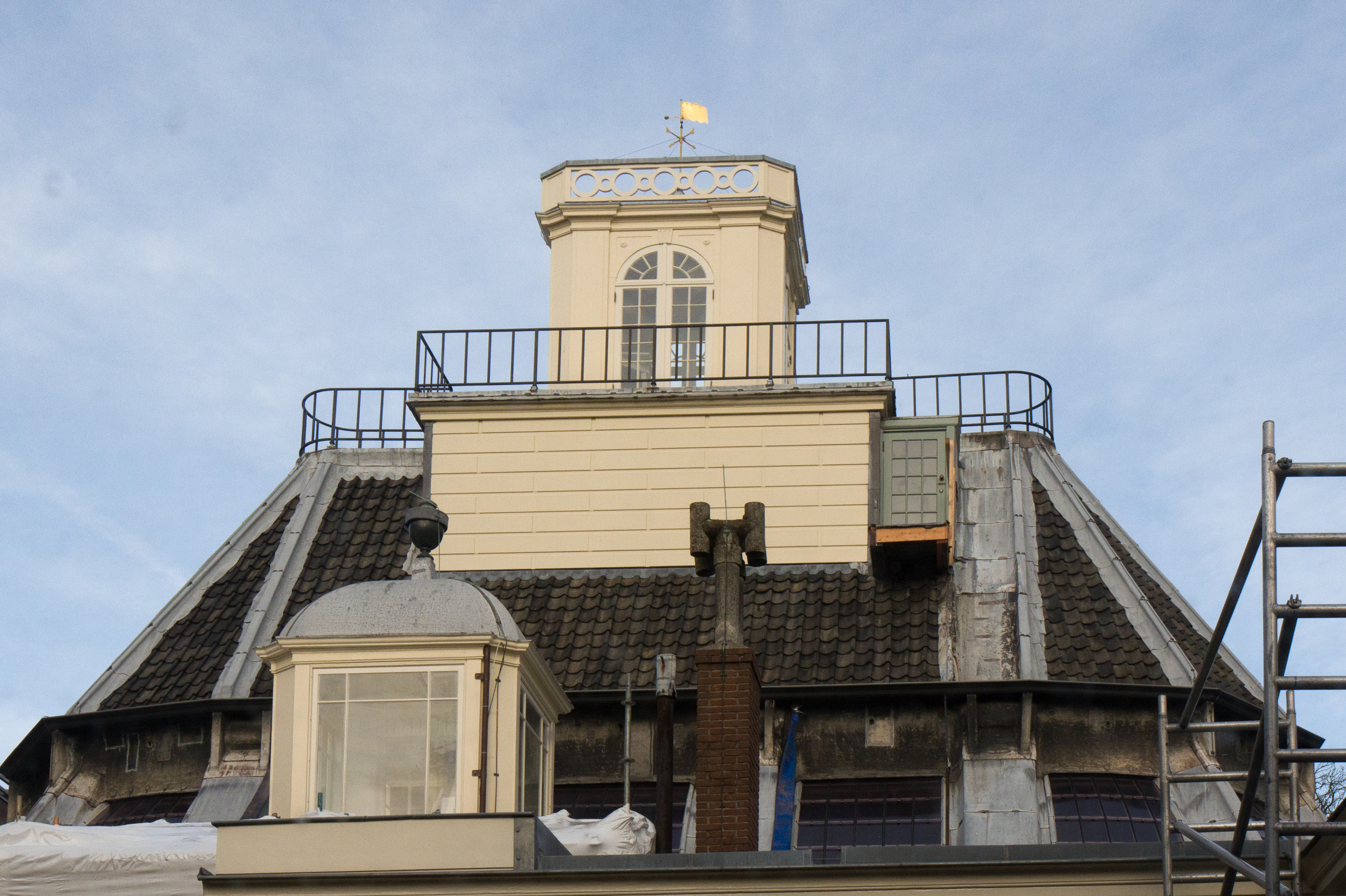
View from the Fundatiehuis of the observatory on the top of the Oval room

In 1779, the board of the Teylers Foundation (Teylers Stichting) commissioned Leendert Viervant, the Amsterdam-based architect of amongst others the church of Ouderkerk aan den Amstel and the town hall of Weesp to build a "book and hobby room" or "book and art room" (boek- en liefhebberyzaal or Boek en Konstzael) in the garden of the former house of Pieter Teyler. After his death, Teyler bequeathed a fortune for the pursuit of science, religion, and the arts. His house had been renamed the fundatiehuis to house this fundatie or foundation. The collections of Pieter Teyler himself, but also of the foundation, was growing and space was needed to show the collections in an appropriate way, while also affording space to hold lectures for teaching and to conduct lab experiments with the expensive instruments that had been purchased. Viervant designed both the mineralogical cabinet and the room around it in the neoclassicist style that was popular in the Netherlands at that time. For example, the Ionic order was chosen by Viervant for the columns in the room because it was regarded as the "ideal order for the dignified control and moderation associated with the arts and sciences".

The Oval Room walls have been timbered with pine wood on the floors and oak wood on the walls. In the walls there are alcoves both on the ground floor and on the gallery, which contain parts of the collections. Along the gallery, books have been stored in the alcoves, and on the ground floor mainly scientific instruments. The books could be accessed via the staircase. The cast iron gallery railing included fold-out supports which were the most expensive part of the room and comprised 15% of the total building costs. Every bookcase alcove is topped by the name and a stucco profile of a classical Greek writer or philosopher.

In the middle of the room, an extensive mineralogical collection is housed in a special cabinet that is set up along the same principles as the Fersman Mineralogical Museum built in 1716. This is the second such cabinet designed by Viervant. The first had a display surface that could double as a library table. That table was on rails, so that it could be moved out of the room when necessary, such as for electricity or other lab experiments.

== Function ==
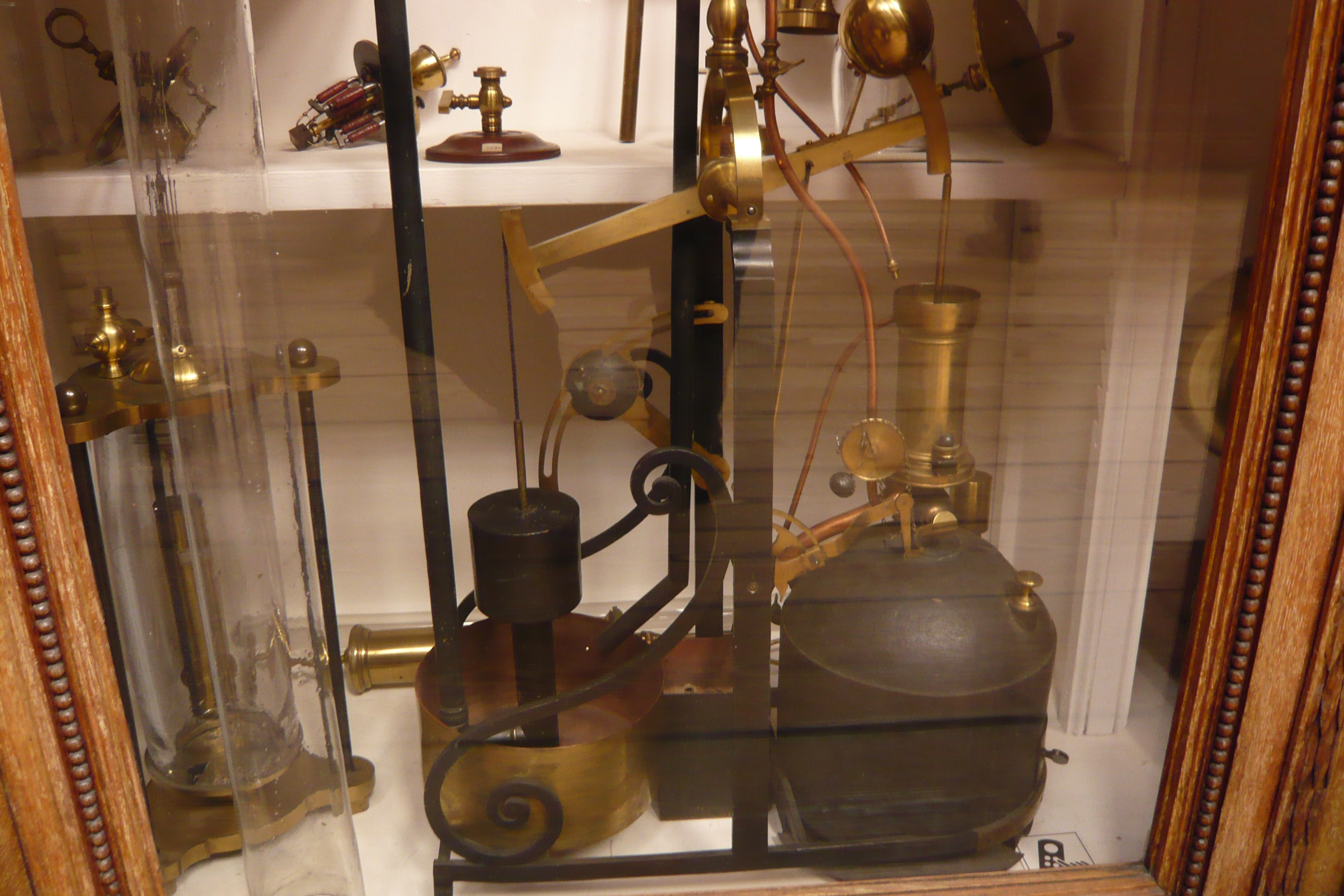
Model of a Thomas Newcomen steam engine built by Edward Nairne in 1770 – one example of the many instruments in the room that was formerly used for experiments

Teylers Museum rooms

The Teylers Museum, and with that the Oval Room, was the first museum open to the public in the Netherlands. Though the Oval room included a library, observatory, and lab to show experiments to the public, the concept of a museum did not really exist yet when it was completed in 1781. At the time, the Teylers Oval room was seen more as a very large version of a curiosity cabinet with room to show large demonstrations of technological innovations, such as were done with the electrostatic generator. Some of the directors felt it should really contain a museum-like collection.

In the first years the central piece was not a cabinet, but a table on which experiments would be done. The central table would be moved out of the way when the electrostatic generator was going to be used. The drawings and minerals in the collection were stored in this central piece The instruments were stored in cabinets on the first floor.

== Exposition ==
The ground floor is still open for visitors, though they now enter and exit from a new door on the east side that was built in 1878. The old door to Teyler's fundatiehuis is closed off. The way the contents are displayed in the room has barely changed since 1800. In the central exhibition cabinets minerals have been showcased, as well as the Top of the Mont Blanc, separated from the mountain in 1787 by one of the first climbers of that mountain, Horace-Bénédict de Saussure. In the cabinets on the sides and outside cabinets, instruments are showcased. For example a world and celestial globe by George and Dudley Adams from London.
