= Vincent Jansz van der Vinne =

Dutch painter

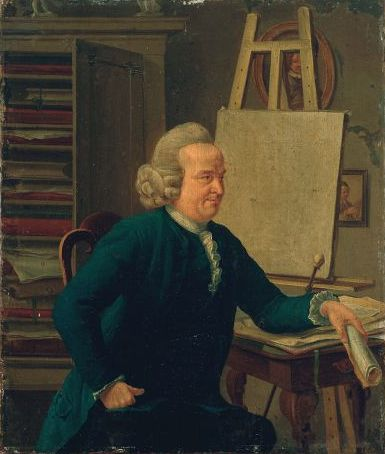
Self portrait

Vincent Jansz van der Vinne (1736–1811) was a Dutch 18th century painter and the great-grandson of Vincent van der Vinne.

== Biography ==
He was born in Haarlem. According to the RKD he was a pupil of his father Jan Laurentsz van der Vinne, who made botanical paintings of flowers for bulb growers in Haarlem. He became a member of the Haarlem Guild of St. Luke in 1754. He is known for Italianate landscapes and flower still lifes, and also created tapestries. He was the first curator of art for the young Teyler's Museum from 1778 to 1785. In his will Pieter Teyler van der Hulst had stipulated that "an artistic painter or other lover of the arts and sciences" would live in his house (later called Fundatiehuis). His task would be to maintain the books in the library and other collections (the medals, prints and drawings); and to catalogue and conserve them. This person would also be the manager or "resident caretaker" of the house, and, later, of the museum. Van der Vinne was the first resident caretaker of Teylers Museum and set up his studio in the fundatiehuis. He left after an argument with Martin van Marum, whereupon his position was filled by Wybrand Hendriks. Van der Vinne died in Haarlem in 1811.

== Works ==
He is known for decorations for whole rooms, though little has survived of the work he did for Teylers Stichting. On the Gedempte Oude Gracht, Haarlem, a series of wall decorations symbolizing the four seasons remain as they were installed in 1776 in house number 90-92 (today a furniture store, open to the public).

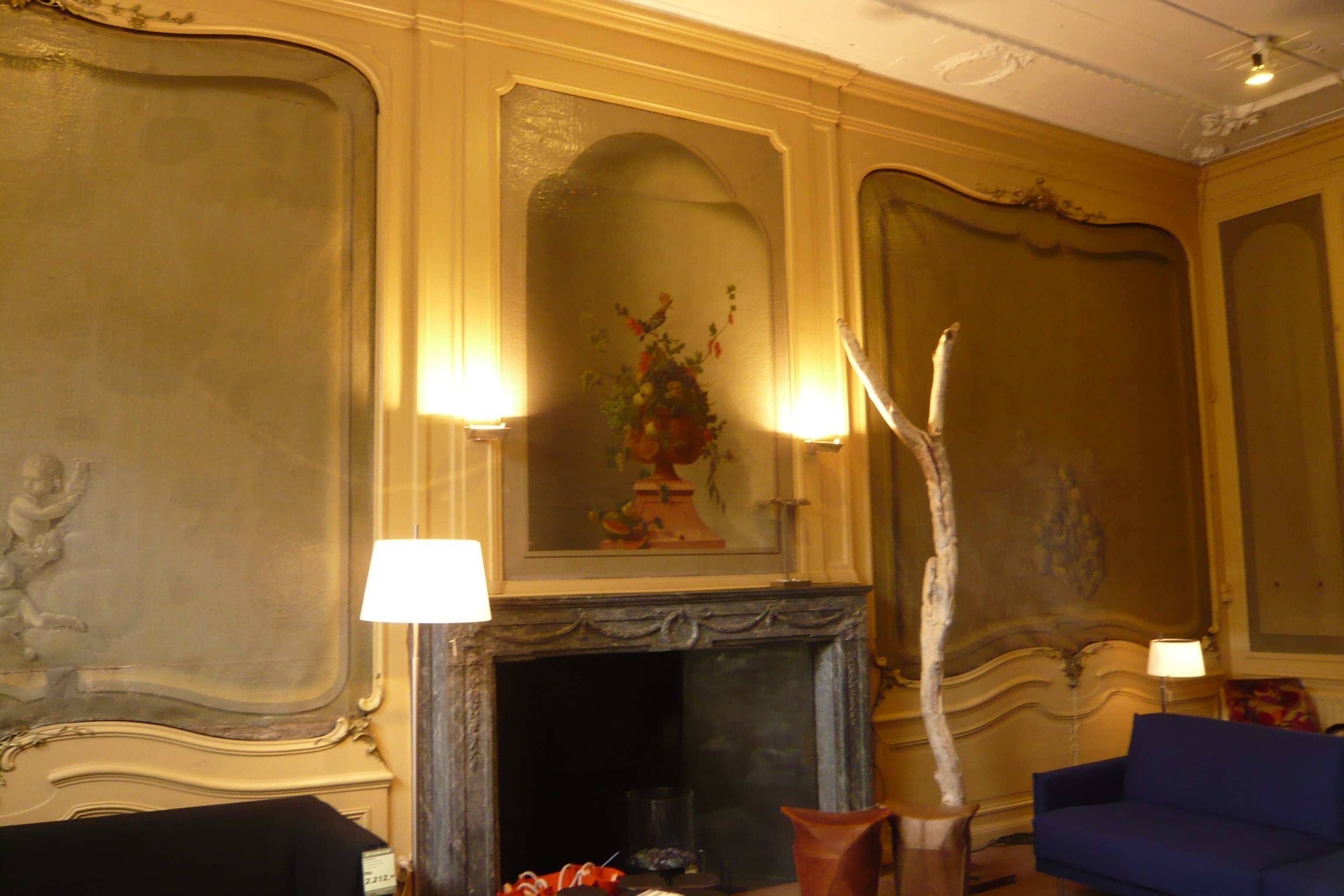
West wall with hearth, on the left, a grisaille depicting summer, above the hearth flowers with watermelon, and on the right, a grisaille depicting spring

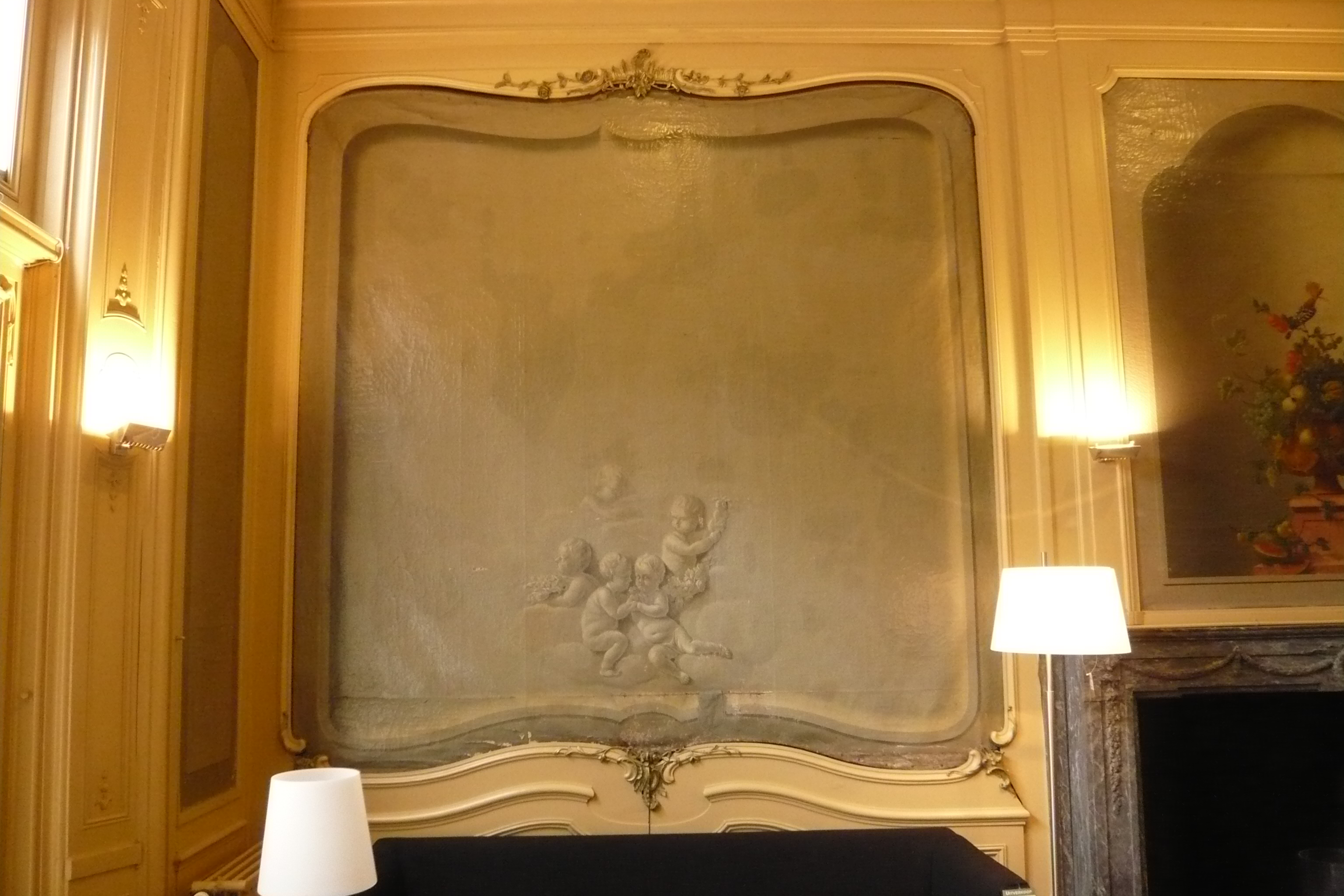
Grisaille depicting summer

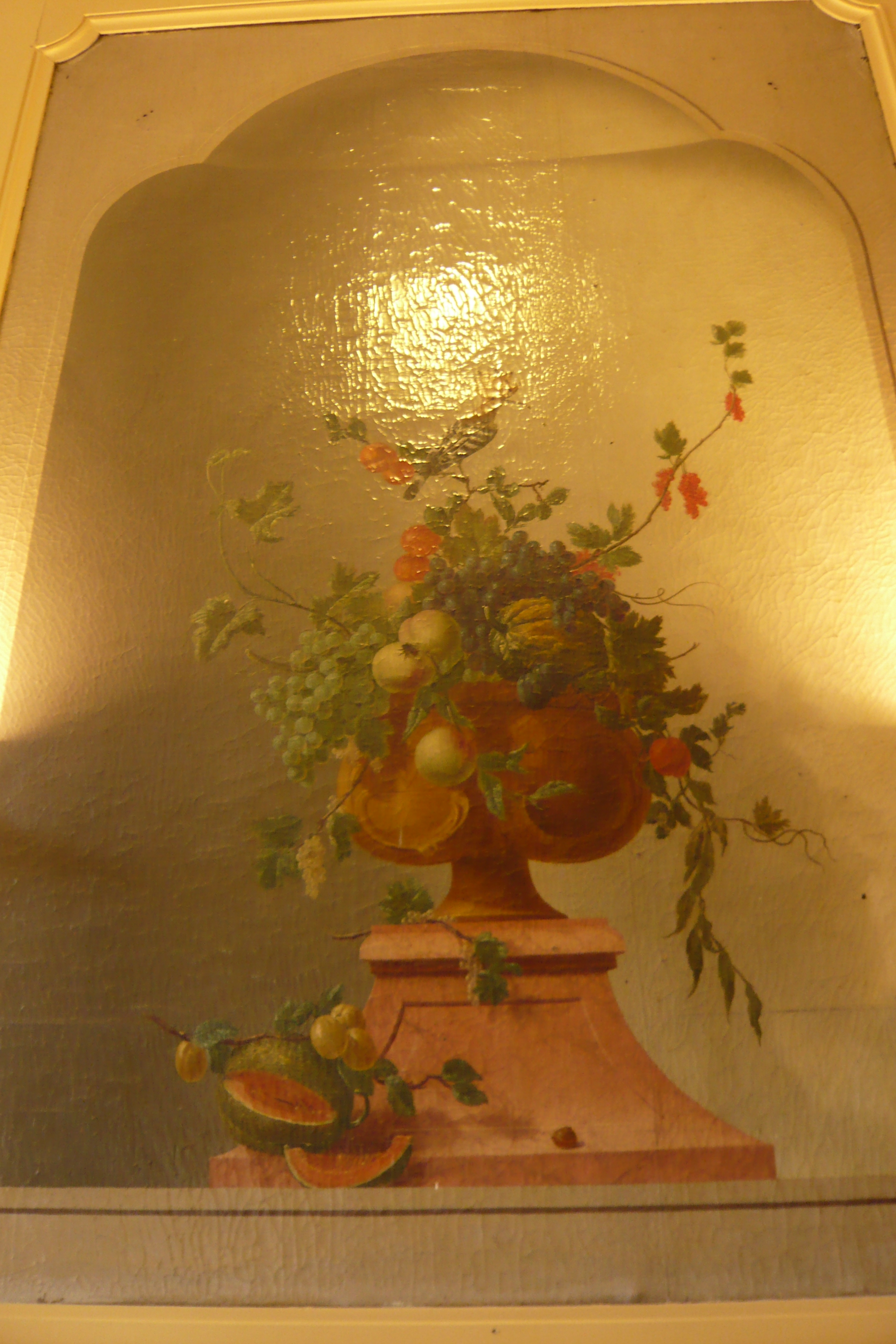
Flowers and fruits in a vase with watermelon (above the hearth)

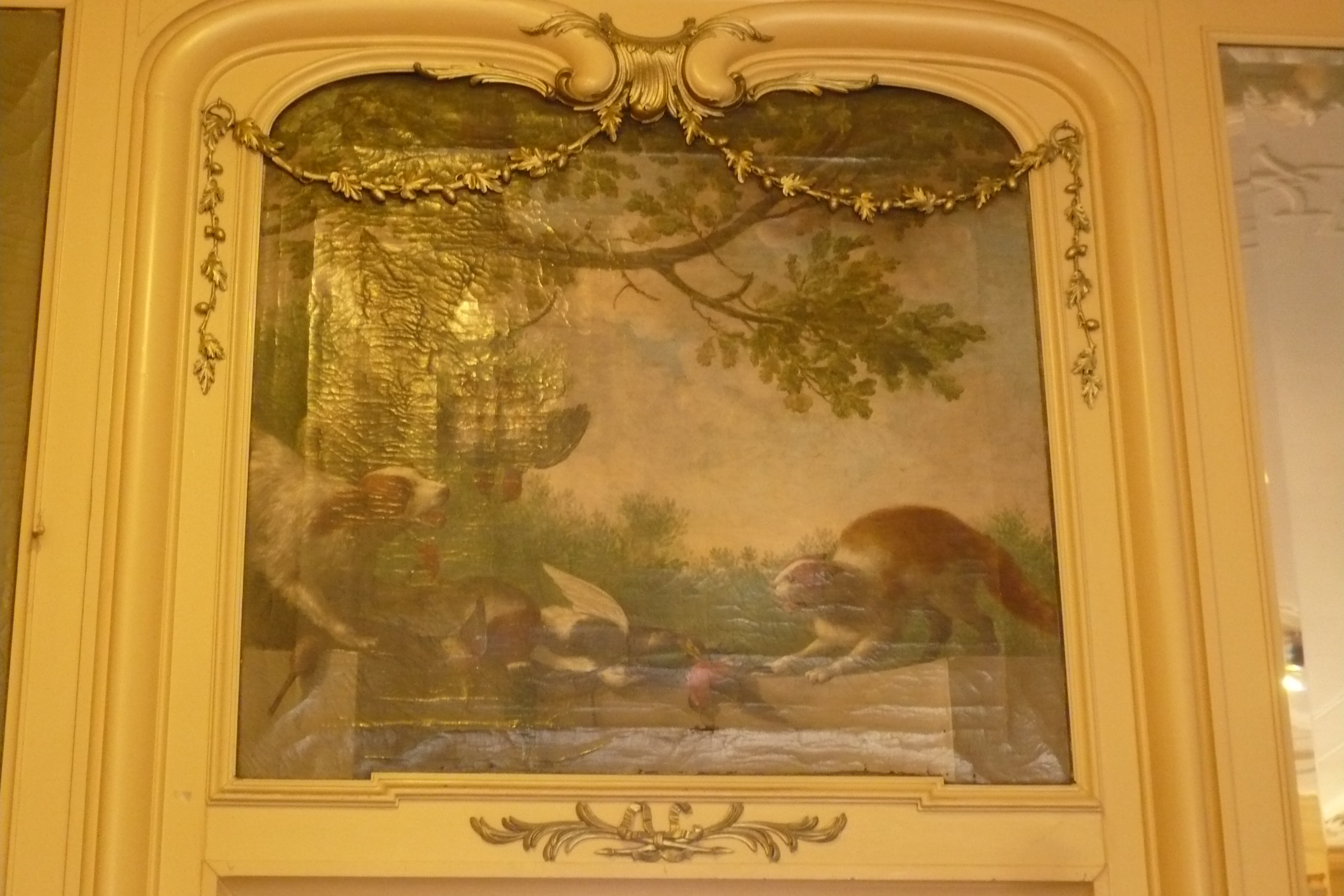
Cat and dog fighting over fruits of the hunt

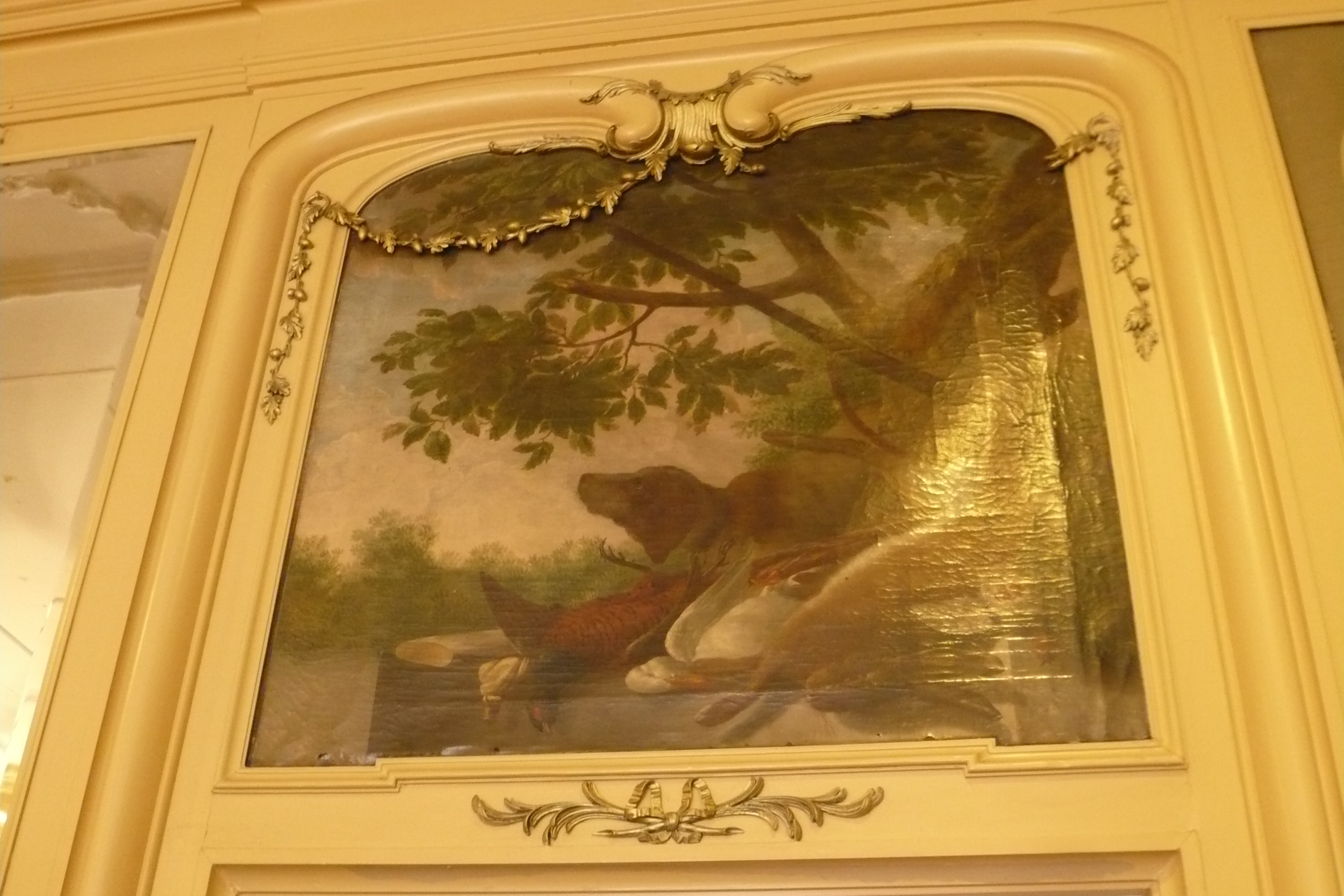
Dog guarding the fruits of the hunt

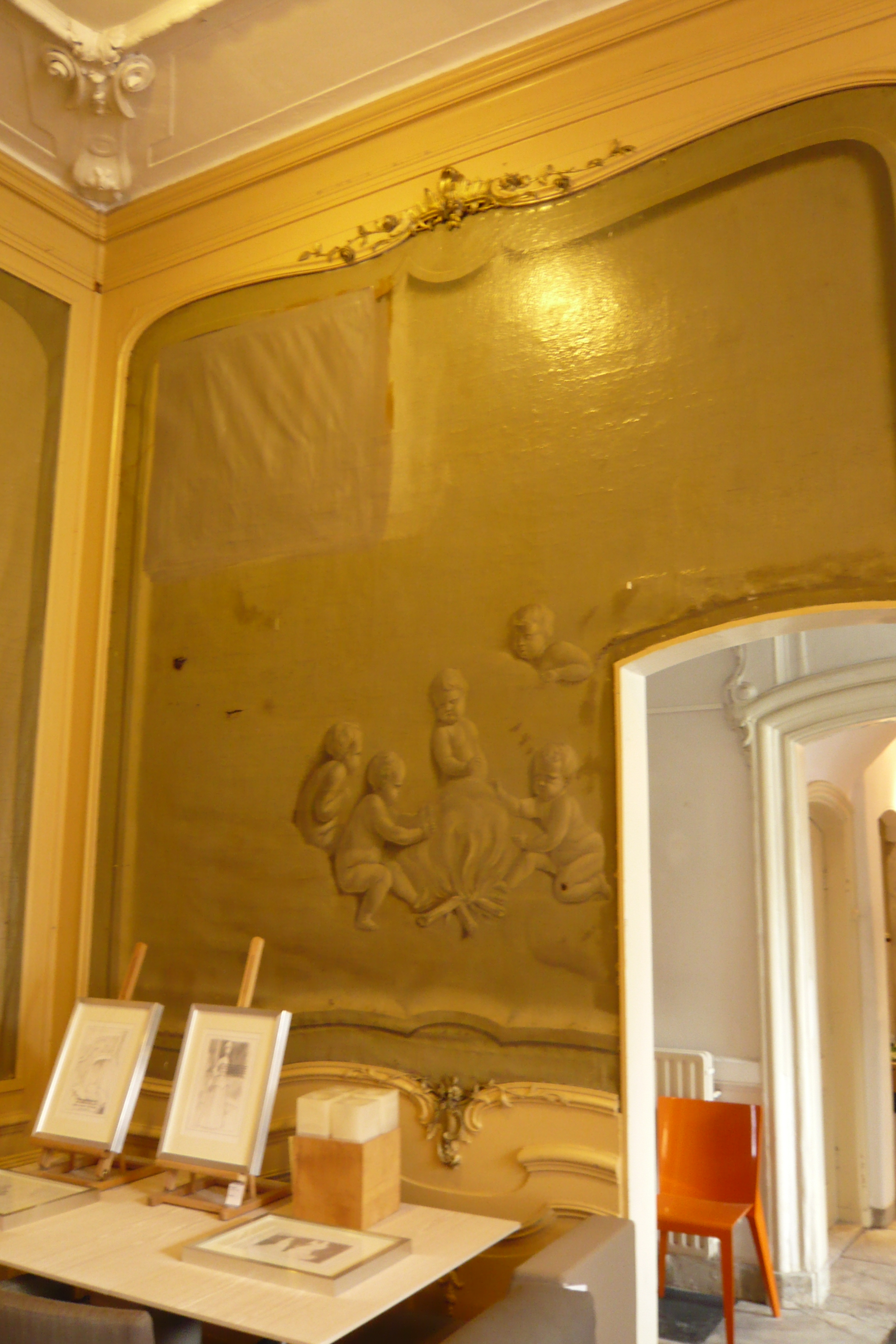
East wall grisaille depicting Winter (across from spring)

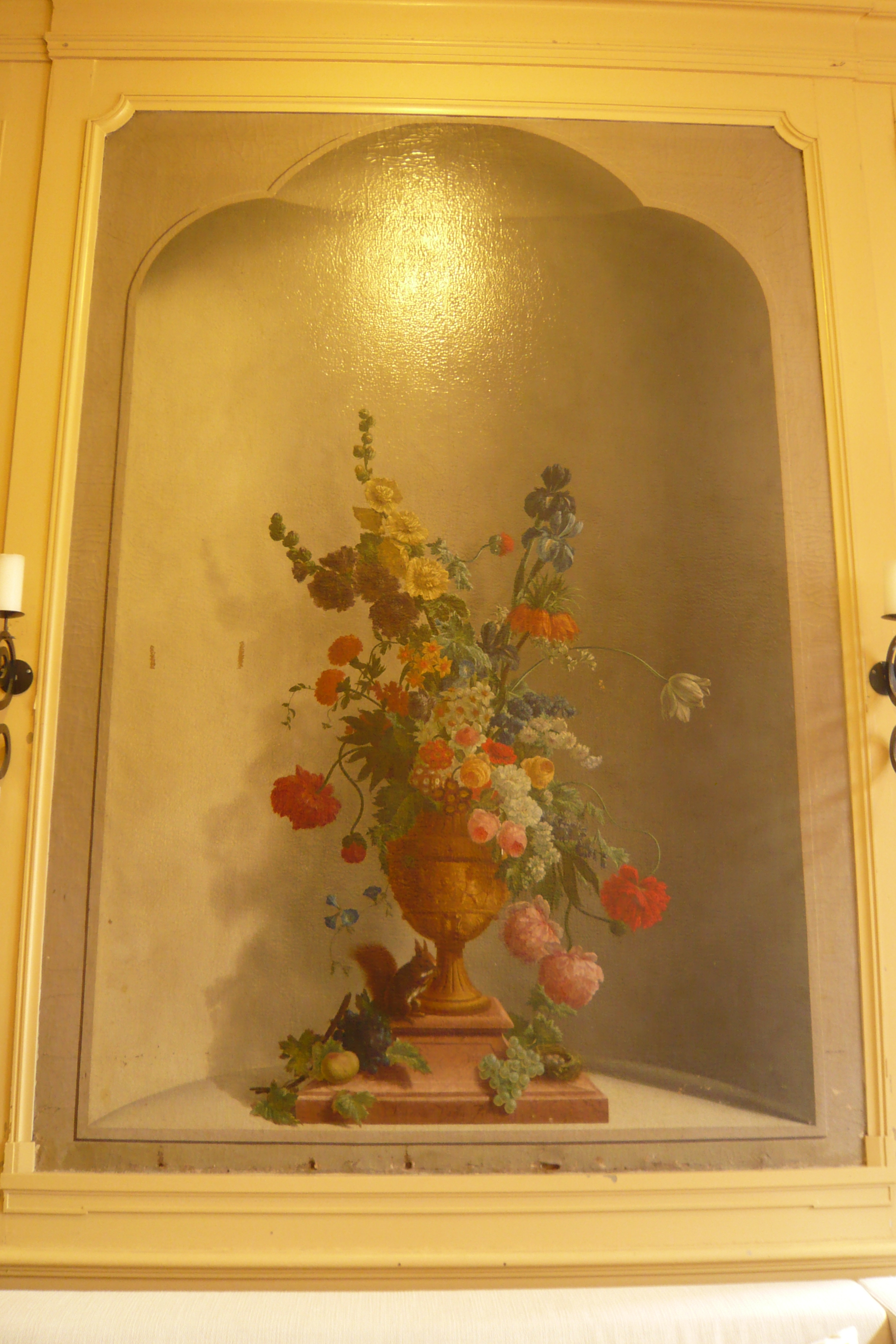
Flowers in a vase with a squirrel

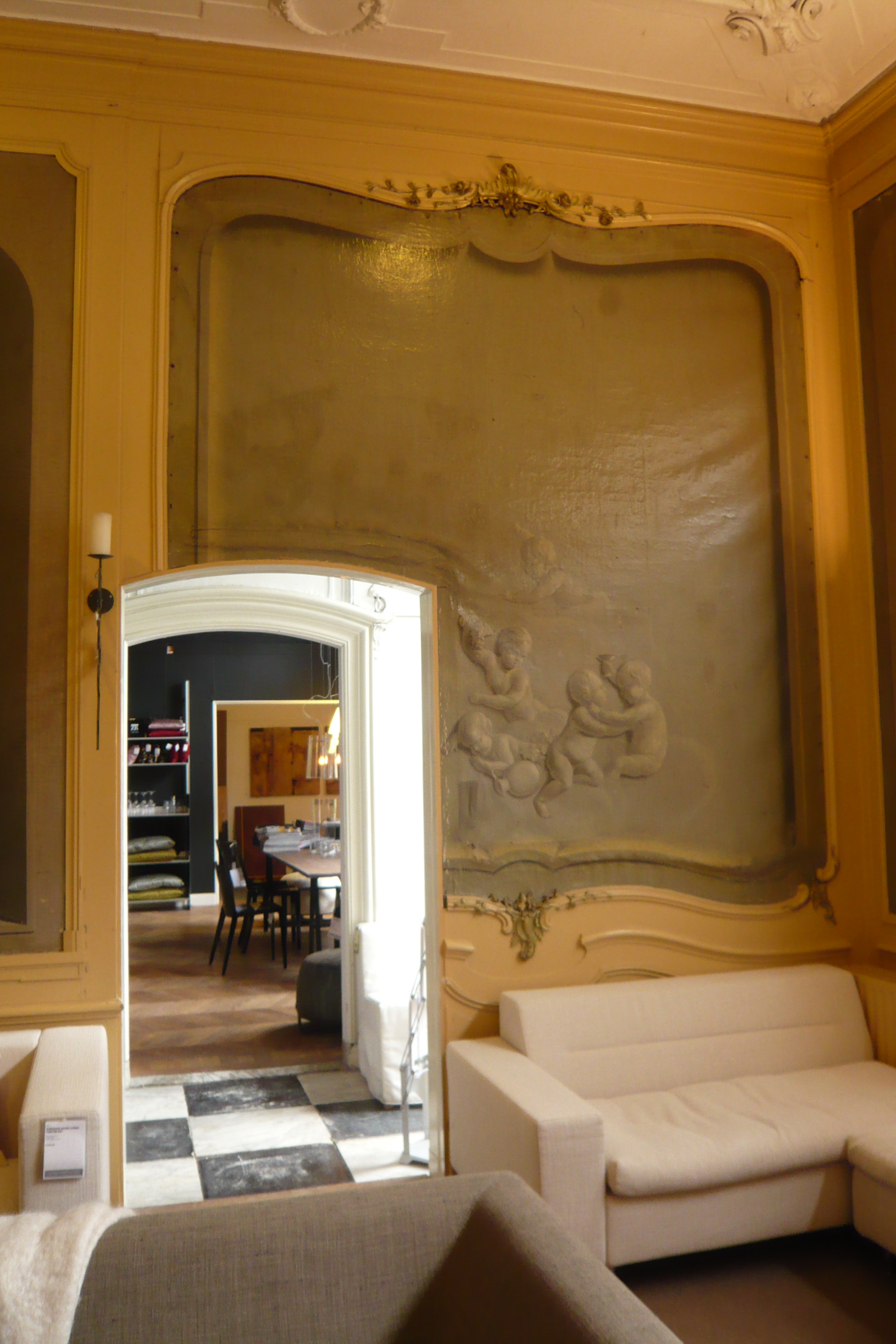
grisaille depicting autumn (across from summer)

== External sources ==
- Biography of van der Vinne on Teylers Museum website.
- Vincent Jansz. van der Vinne on Artnet.
