= Gerrit Johan van Leeuwen =

Dutch painter

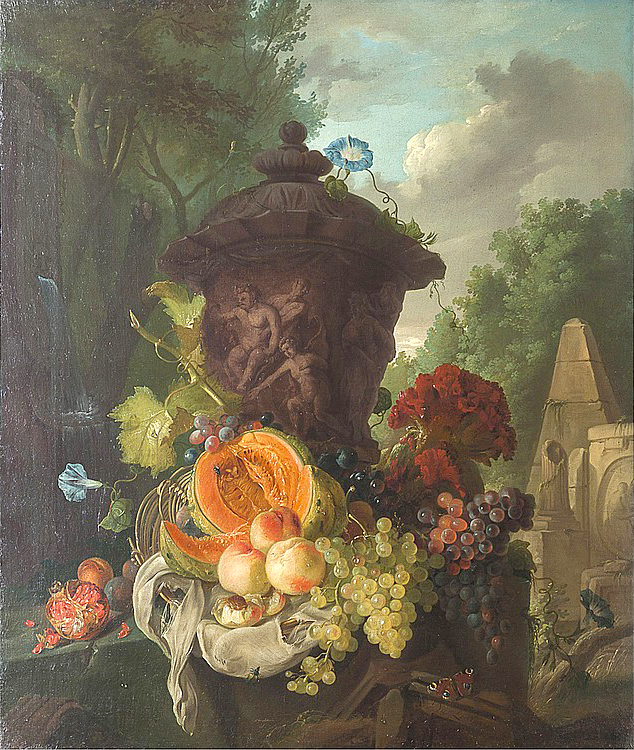
Gerrit Johan van Leeuwen - Still life with urn and classical ruins

Gerrit Johan van Leeuwen (1756 – 1825), was a 19th-century painter from the Dutch Republic.

== Biography ==
He was born in Arnhem and trained in Haarlem where he was a pupil of Wybrand Hendriks. He returned to Arnhem where he became a successful fruit and flower painter and respected director of the drawing academy there. He died in Arnhem.
