= Pieter Teyler van der Hulst =

Dutch Mennonite merchant and banker

Pieter Hulst
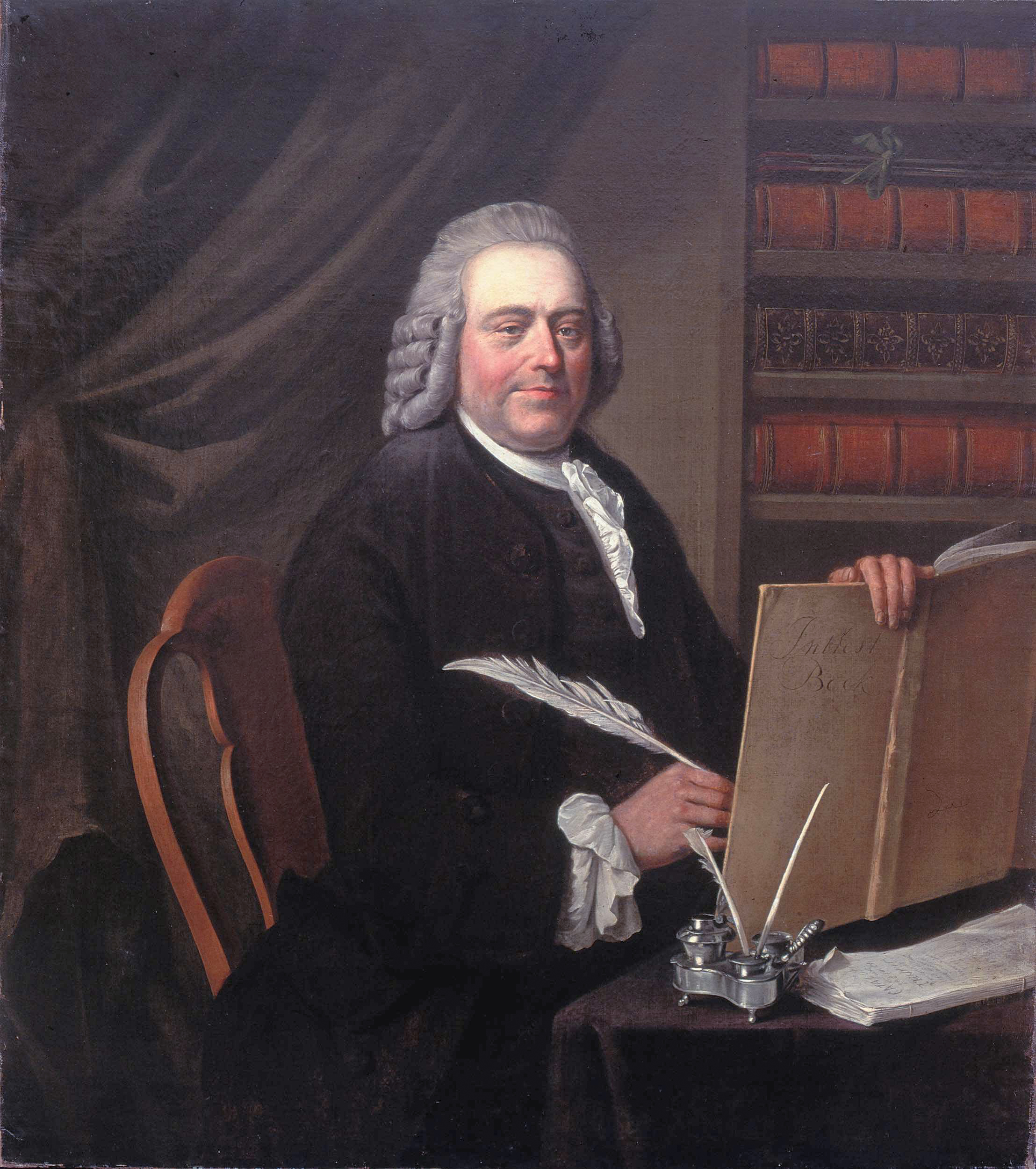
- Portrait of Pieter Teyler van der Hulst, 1787, by Wybrand Hendriks (after a painting by Frans Decker, since lost). Pieter Teyler is portrayed both as a financier with his "Intrest Boek" -the "Interest Book" he used to track interest rates and outstanding loans- and also as a collector, with art albums in the background. The portrait hangs in the Smaller Boardroom in Teylers Foundation House.
- Born: 25 March 1702; Haarlem, The Netherlands
- Died: 8 April 1778 (aged 76)

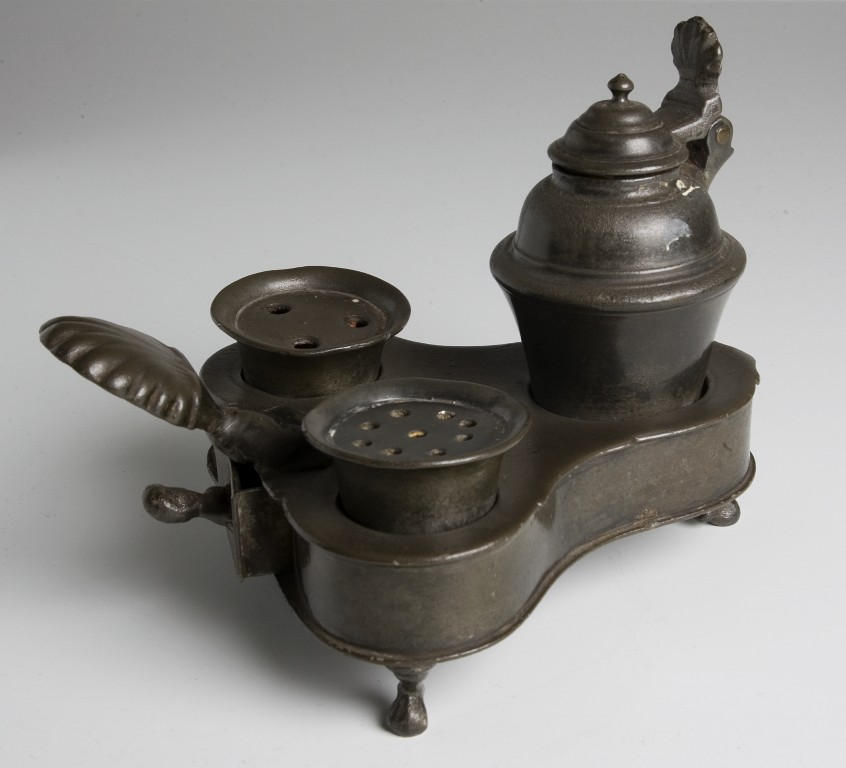
Pieter Teyler's pewter inkstand (depicted in his portrait above) is still in the collection of Teylers Museum.

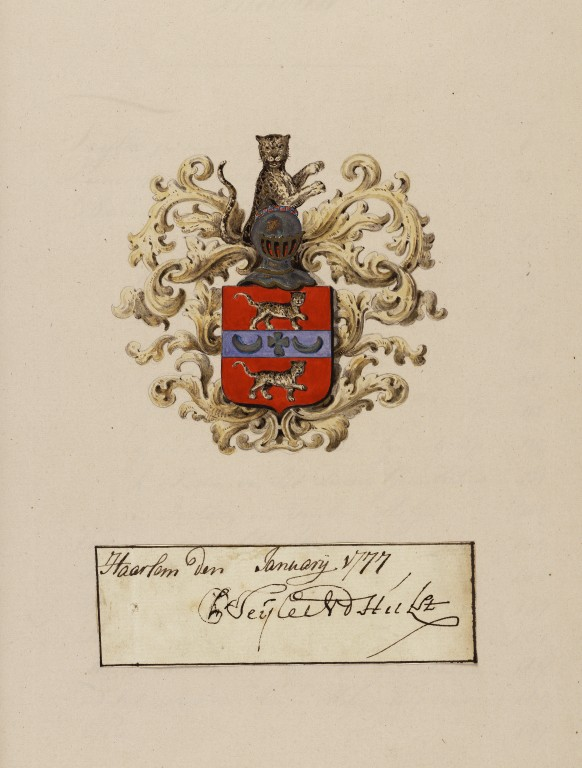
Signature and blazon of Pieter Teyler

Pieter Teyler van der Hulst (25 March 1702 – 8 April 1778) was a wealthy Dutch Mennonite merchant and banker, who died childless, leaving a legacy of two million florins (in today's terms: about EUR 80 million) to the pursuit of religion, arts and science in his hometown, that led to the formation of Teyler's Museum. This was not the value of his entire estate. He also founded Teylers Hofje in his name, and made important donations to individuals in the Mennonite community.

== Biography ==
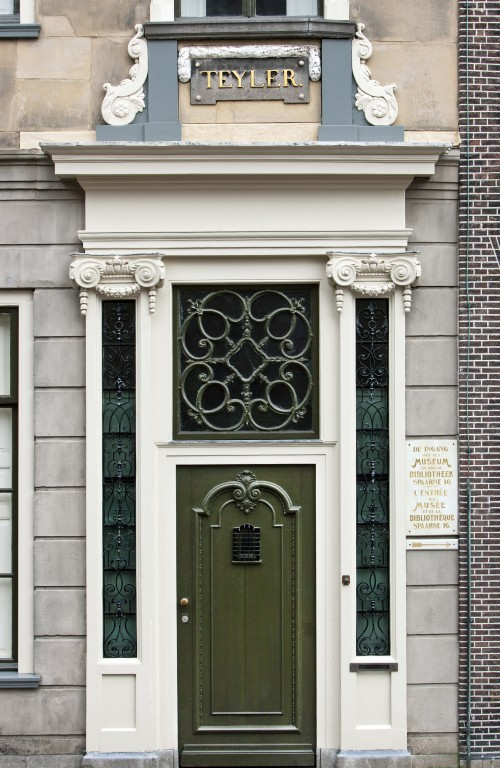
The front door of Teylers Fundatiehuis. Until the Spaarne wing was built in 1885, access to Teylers Museum was gained through this door: the front door of Pieter Teyler's residence.

Pieter Teyler van der Hulst was born on 25 March 1702 in Haarlem in the Dutch Republic.

Teyler was an active follower of the Scottish Enlightenment, being descended from wealthy Scots merchants. His name is derived from the Scottish Tailor. He married the lady Helena Wynands Verschaave in 1728. He was an active member of the "Waterlander" Mennonite community and became a trustee of the city orphanage from 1750 onwards. He made his wealth as a silk and cloth merchant, but from 1763 he became more and more active as a banker. He made loans to his Haarlem contemporaries, including to his fellow Scot and neighbor George Clifford III, the wealthy Amsterdam merchant known for sponsoring Carl Linnaeus. Scottish bankers such as Teyler, Clifford, and Hope & Co. were all patrons of the arts and sciences. Teyler was also active in the Haarlem Mennonite community with his wife, and together they founded a Mennonite hofje in the Teyler name in 1752. Unlike other Mennonite hofjes of Haarlem, however, it was not necessary for its residents to be Mennonites.

In the 18th century, the ruling classes of Amsterdam (where Teyler had his banking offices) and Haarlem were all Protestants, as was the Dutch Stadtholder. Roman Catholics, Mennonites, Quakers, and others were unable to participate in organisations such as the Dutch Society of Science (Hollandsche Maatschappij der Wetenschappen), which was started in Haarlem in 1752 with the purpose of pursuing science in all aspects. This society moved in 1831 across the Spaarne river from Teyler's Museum, and has had close ties with Teyler's legacy ever since.

Pieter Teyler was influenced by the local Natural History College (Dutch: Natuurkundig College)(whose activities are mentioned in 1730) and the Dutch Society of Sciences. Other Mennonites and citizens of Haarlem who were interested in natural history were members of these institutions. With others, he was involved in the initiative to establish the City Drawing School (1772). By lending large sums of money, he also facilitated other initiatives, including new premises for the Dutch Society of Sciences (1777) and the establishment of a College of Music (1773).

== Collection ==
Unfortunately, little is documented of the original collection of Pieter Teyler. When he died, he had a large collection of natural history artefacts, medals, drawings, and a large library. The early executors of his will seem to have sold some of it to create the Oval Room, and much of the rest of it was mixed in with later purchases, but many aspects of his collection remain in the mission of the various aspects of the museum. Curators over the years have managed to reconstruct much of his coin collection, and many of the paintings he purchased for his home are still installed where they were intended.

== Legacy ==
In his Will (written in 1756) Pieter Teyler stipulated that his collection and part of his fortune should be used to establish a foundation for their promotion: Teylers Stichting. The Teyler legacy to the city of Haarlem was split into two societies: Teylers First or Theological Society (Dutch: Teylers Eerste of Godgeleerd Genootschap), intended for the study of religion and Teylers Second Society (Dutch: Teylers Tweede Genootschap), which was to concern itself with physics, poetry, history, drawing and numismatics.

The executors of Teyler's Will, the first directors of Teylers Stichting, decided to establish a centre for study and education: Teylers Museum.

His former home in Haarlem with its entrance on the Damstraat is joined to the Teyler's Museum at the rear through a side door in the Oval Room. Today his house is known as the "Fundatiehuis" and is open only by appointment and once a year on "Monumentendag".

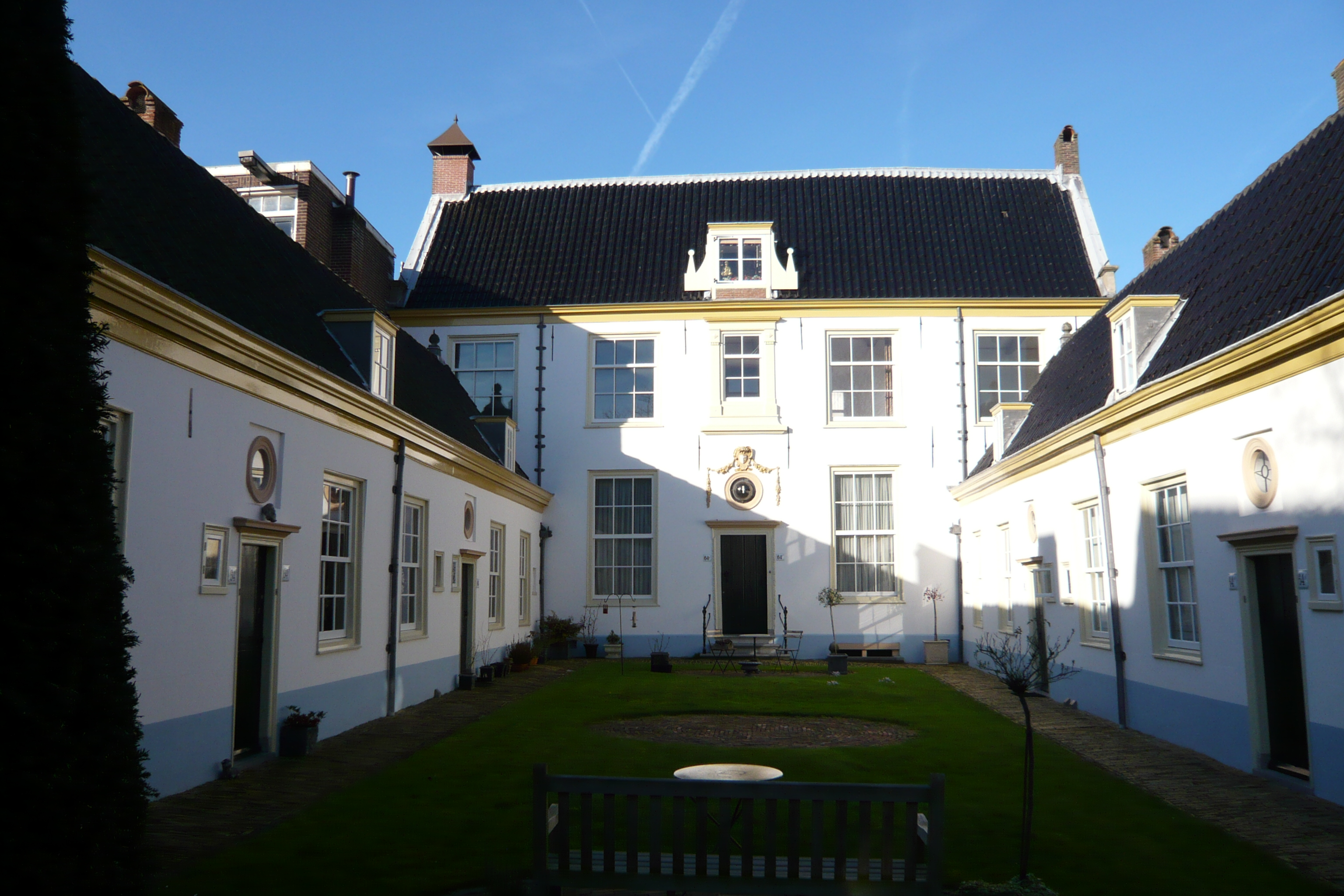
The Vrouwe- en Antonie Gasthuys today, original location of Teyler's hofje from 1752 to 1787

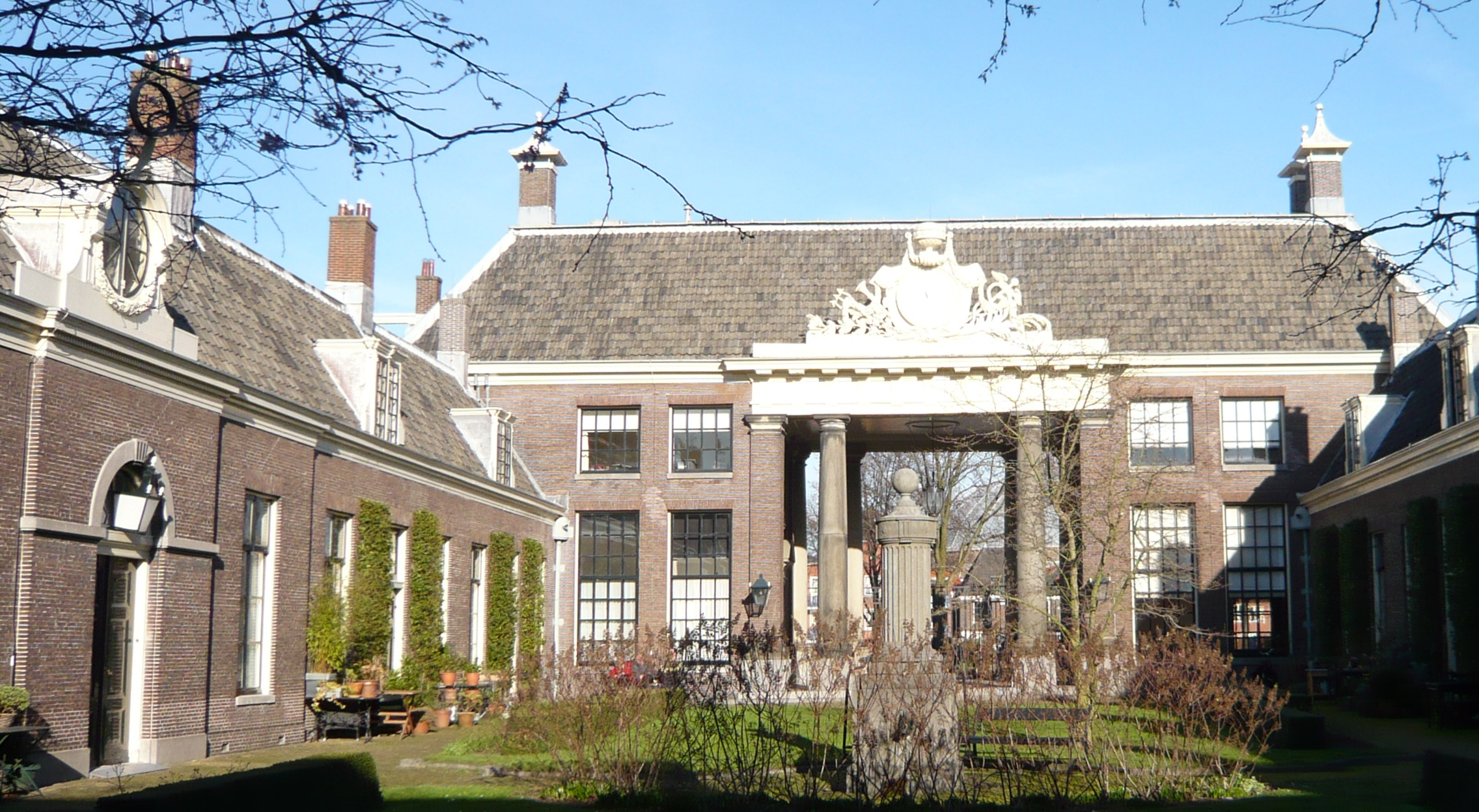
Teylers Hofje today, the grander version built in 1787

== See also ==
- Teylers Stichting
- Teylers First Society
- Teylers Second Society
- Teylers Hofje

== Literature ==
- Teyler 1778–1978. Studies en bijdragen over Teylers Stichting naar aanleiding van het tweede eeuwfeest (Haarlem / Antwerpen 1978) (in Dutch).
- W.W. Mijnhardt, Tot Heil van ’t Menschdom. Culturele genootschappen in Nederland 1750–1815 (Amsterdam 1988) (in Dutch).
- B. Sliggers (red.), De idealen van Pieter Teyler. Een erfenis uit de Verlichting (Haarlem 2006) (in Dutch).
- Article on the portraits of Pieter Teyler (in Dutch). B. Sliggers, Teyler geportretteerd, Teylers Magazijn 91 (2006), pp. 2–5.
