= Wybrand Hendriks =

Dutch painter (1744–1831)

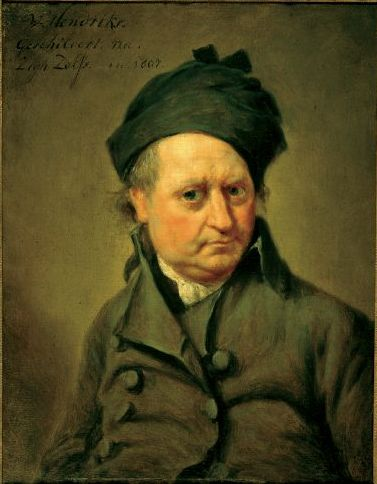
Self-portrait, 1807

Wybrand Hendriks (June 24, 1744 – January 28, 1831) was a Dutch painter, primarily known for his portraits, and the concierge of the Teylers Museum.

== Biography ==
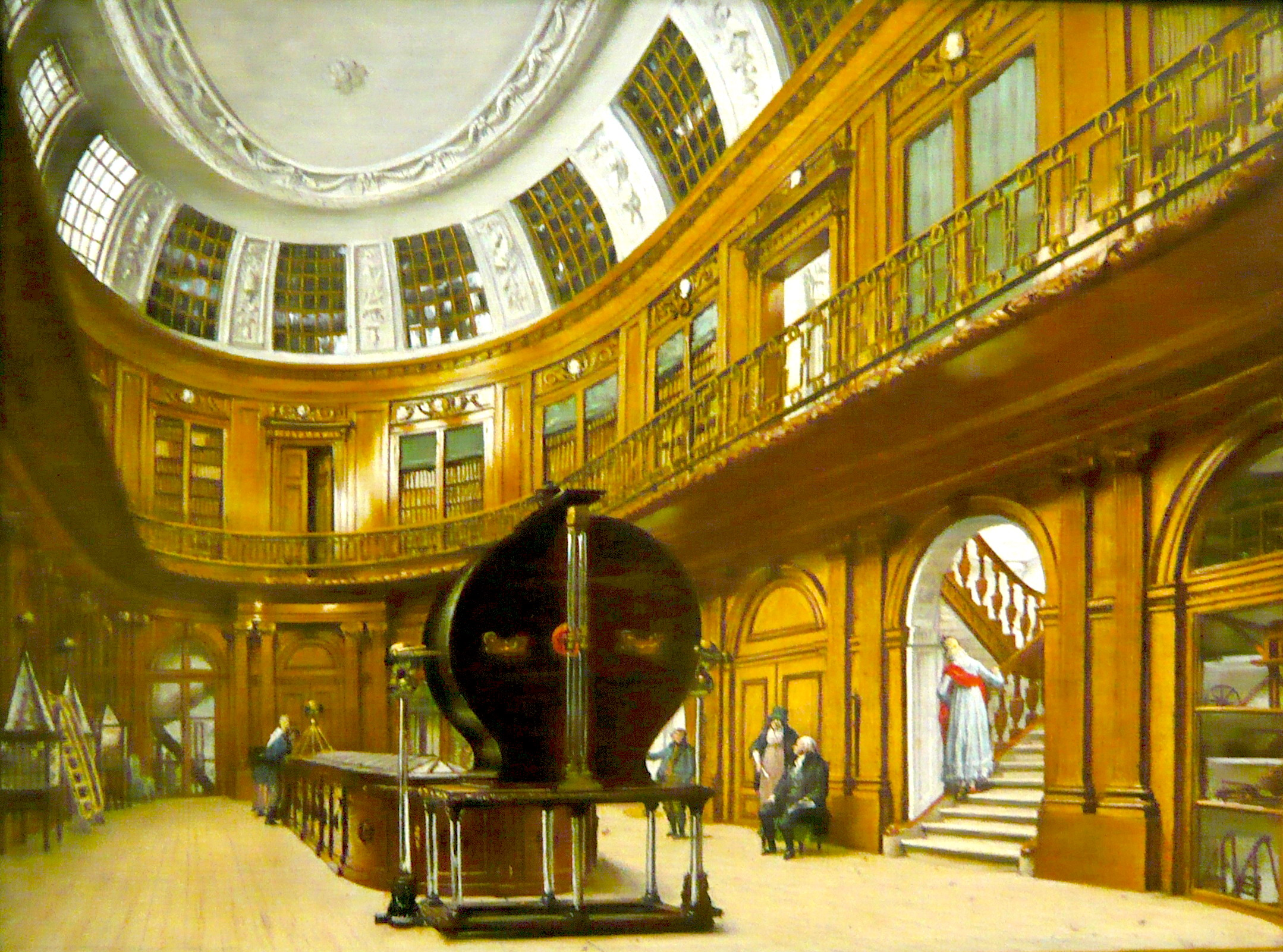
Famous Oval room in the Teylers Museum painted by Wybrand Hendriks, showing Martin van Marum's electriseermachine, one of 9 works by Hendriks hanging in Teylers First Painting Gallery

Wybrand Hendriks was born in Amsterdam. He was the son of the sculptor Hendrik Hendriksz (ca. 1704–1782) and his wife Aaltje Claasdr. Both of his brothers, Hendrik jr. and Frans, followed in the footsteps of their father, also becoming sculptors. His only sister, Cornelia, married the sculptor Rijk Rijke.

According to the Netherlands Institute for Art History, Hendriks learned to paint while working in the decorative wallpaper factory of Johannes Remmers, in Amsterdam. In 1772 he purchased a wallpaper company from Anthony Palthe, son of Gerhard Jan Palthe. In 1775, he married Anthony Palthe's widow, Agatha Ketel, whom he had drawn previously in 1773, wearing mourning clothes.

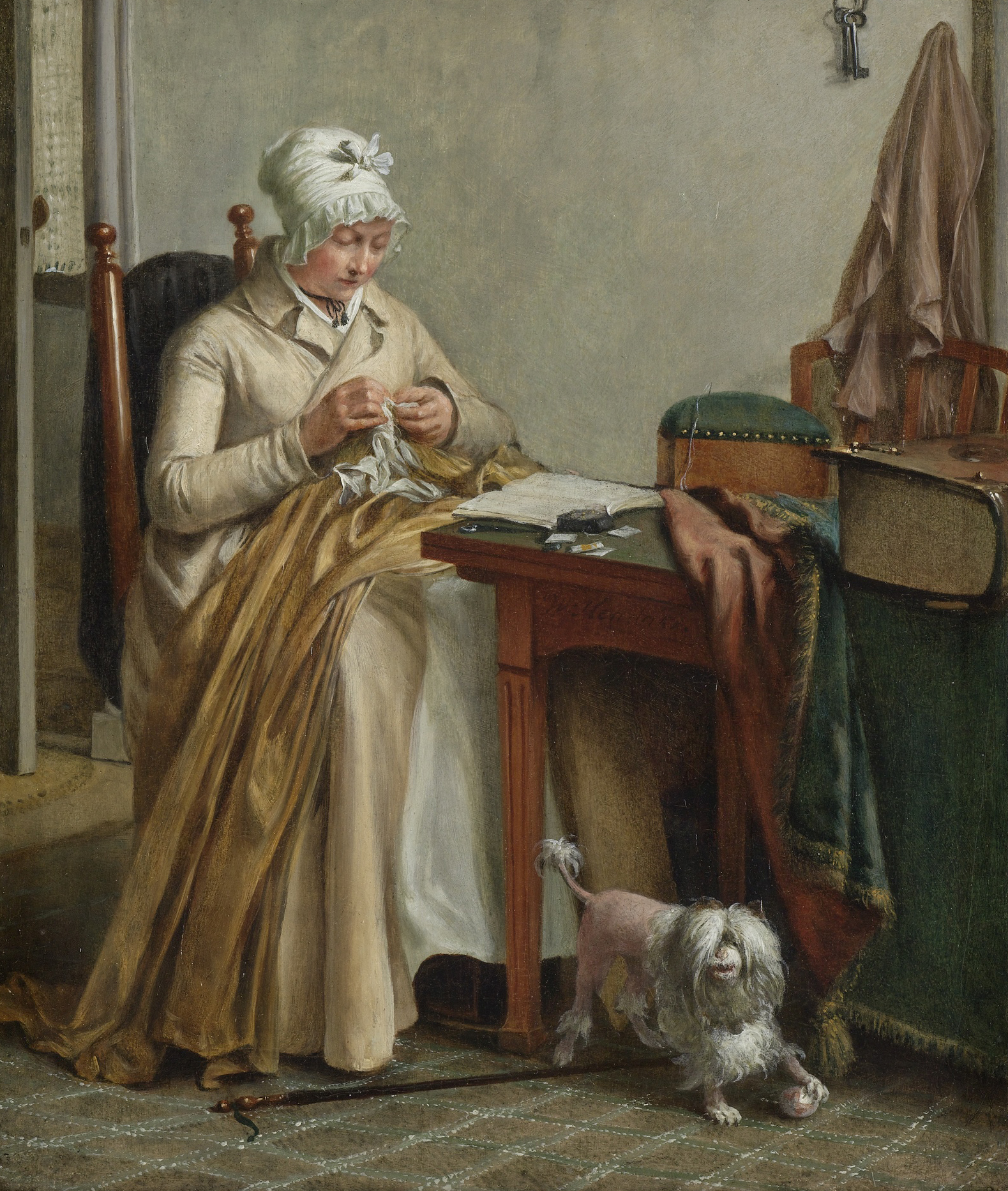
Interior with woman

A painting he later made in 1791 of her sitting across from him at a table (probably situated in the fundatiehuis) was purchased for Teylers Museum with support from the Vereniging Rembrandt in 1999. Later that year they got married [again?], and made a trip to England and Belgium.

In the 1780s he served a five-year term as one of the directors of the Haarlemse Tekenacademie (Haarlem drawing academy). He assumed the position of concierge ("kastelein") of the Teyler's Stichting in Haarlem in 1785, after his predecessor Vincent Jansz van der Vinne had left following a disagreement with Martin van Marum, the head of the fossil and instrument collections. Wybrand held this position from 1786 until 1819, and he lived at the "Fundatiehuis" as curator of the art collection. He maintained and restored the pieces in the collection as well. He maintained a studio in the old drawing room of Teyler's drawing academy, which had been moved to the city hall. As curator, he was responsible for expanding the collection of art, and for that he participated in auctions throughout the Netherlands to purchase drawings. In 1790, through Willem Anne Lestevenon, he managed to purchase an important collection of 1,700 Italian drawings from the collection of Queen Christina of Sweden (the Odescalchi collection). This collection included works by Michelangelo and Raphael, which are currently amongst the most important and valuable pieces in the Teylers Museum art collection.

After his wife Agatha died in 1802, he remarried Geertruid Harmsen in 1806, the widow of J.Radecker, the city organist of Haarlem, though she died shortly afterwards, in 1817. Two years later he moved to a house in the Oude Gracht of Haarlem, where he lived until he died in 1831 at the age of 86. Hendriks was active as regent of the Vrouwe- en Antony Gasthuis hofje, a member of the Haarlem city council, and was a patriotic supporter of the French revolution at the end of the 19th century.

Among his registered pupils were Hermanus van Brussel, Warnaar Horstink, Gerrit Johan van Leeuwen, Hendrina Alida Sollewijn, Abraham Vallenduuk, and Jacobus Vrijmoet.

== Works ==
He is known for portraits, landscapes, and copies after older masters, such as flower still lifes in the manner of Jan van Huysum. Hendriks created several paintings in and around the Teylers Museum, for example of the directors of the Teylers Stichting, the Oval Room and the inner garden of the Foundation House. His paintings of the inner garden of the Foundation House and the Oval Room seem to have been created with the help of convex mirrors and other optical aids because the perspectives are impossible to achieve without this.

He created portraits of, amongst others, Jacob van der Vos sr., Christiaan Scholten, Christiaan van Orsoy, Jan Petrus Scholten van Aschat, Frederik Alexander Vernède, Wernerus Köhne, Adriaan van der Willigen and Martinus van Marum. He also made grisailles, like the one presented here. This grisaille now adorns a fireplace in the Frans Hals Museum in one of the regent's rooms of the Oude mannenhuis. The subject is taken from the marble sculpture in the garden of the Fundatiehuis.

Selected pictures

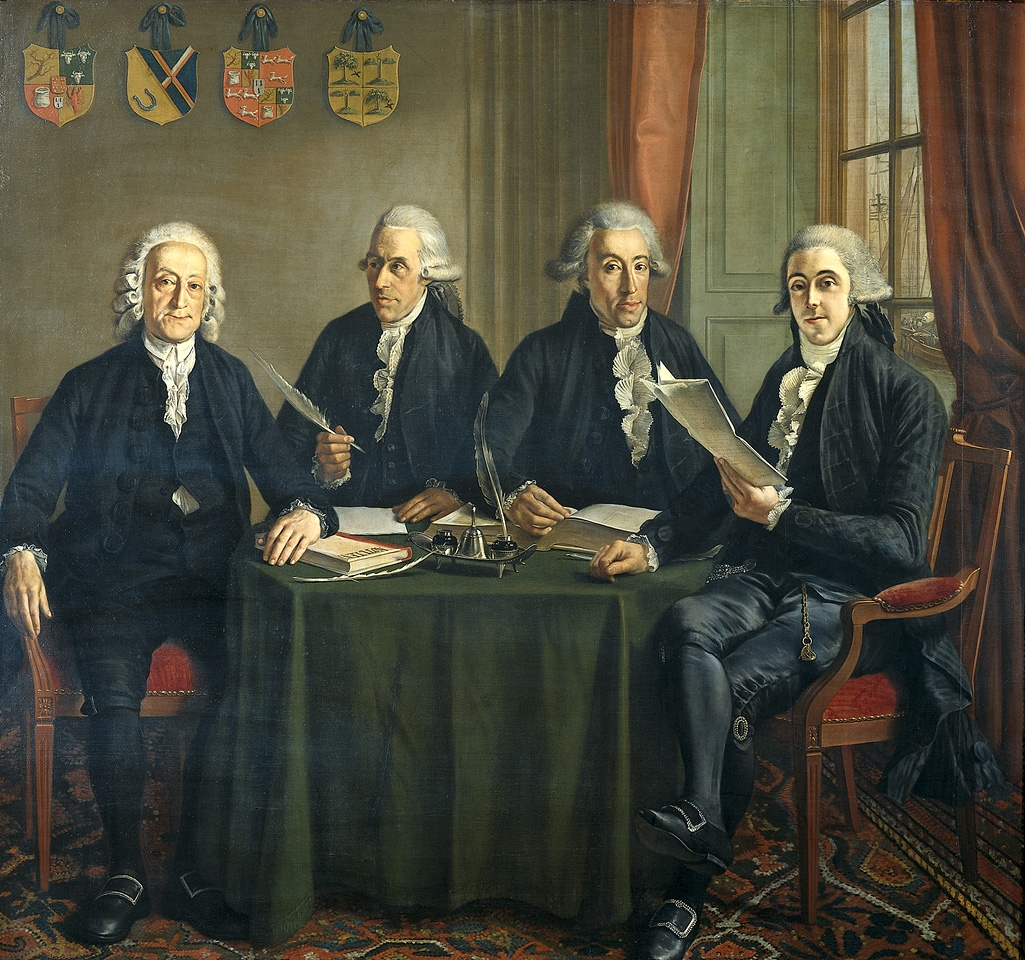
Group portrait of the four chief commissioners of the ports, quays and cranes in Amsterdam, sitting around a table

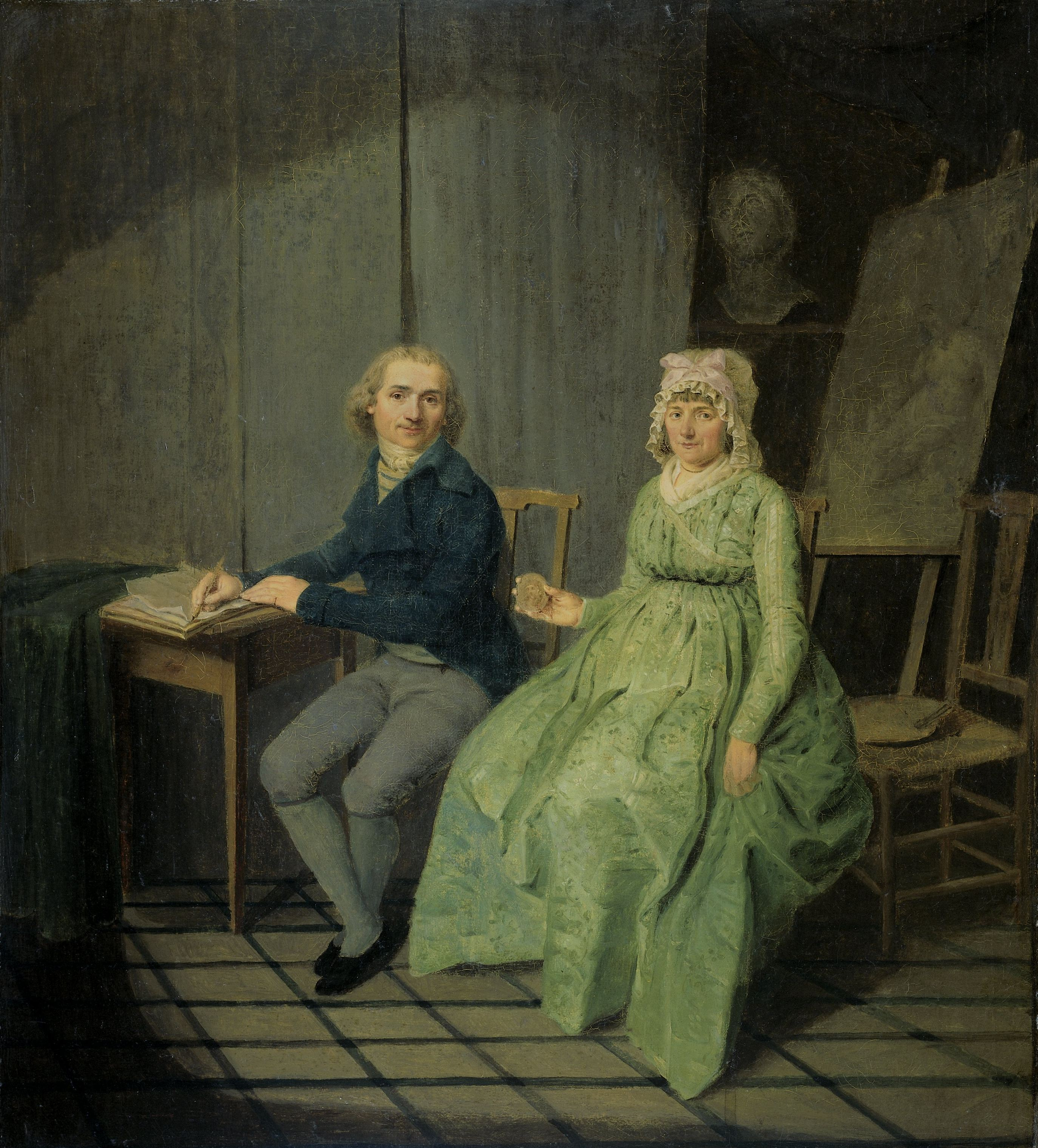
Wybrand Hendriks and Agatha Ketel

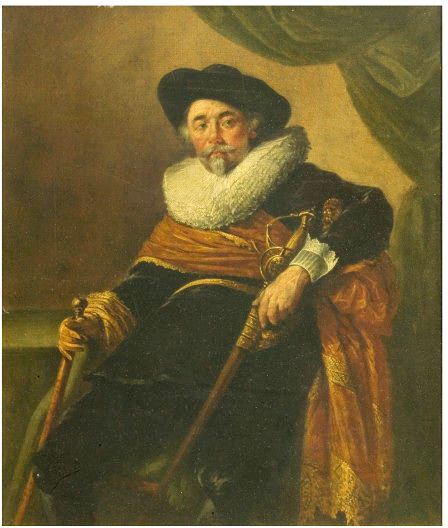
Portrait of Colonel Cornelis Backer after Pieter Claesz Soutman's 1642 schutterstuk. The man resembles Hendriks himself

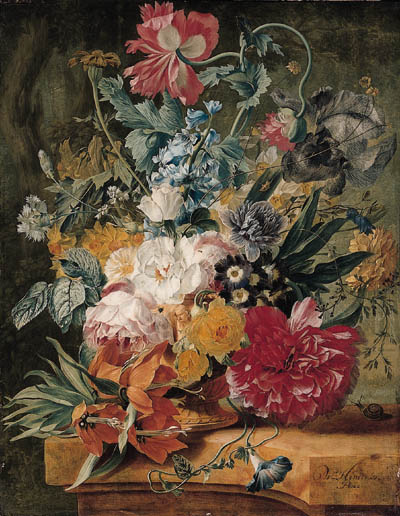
Vase of flowers after Jan van Huysum

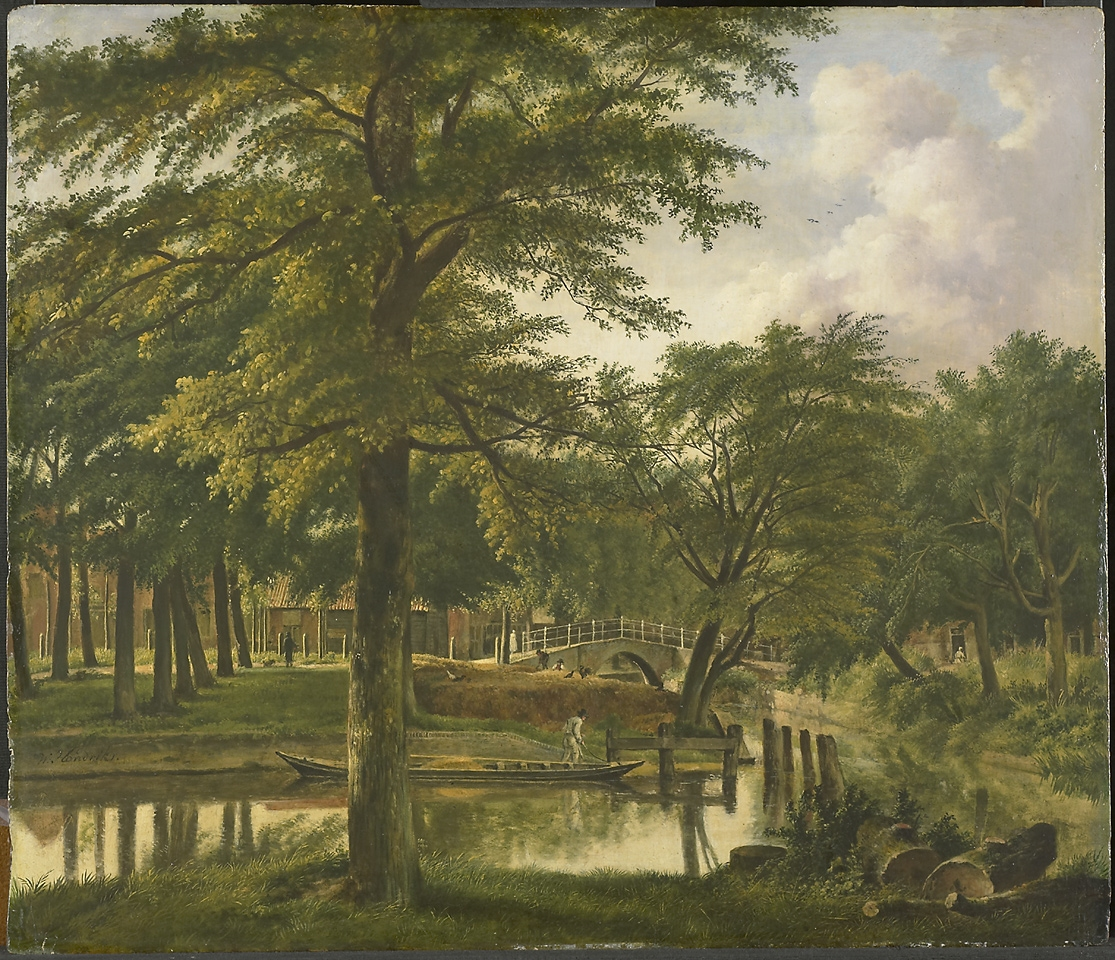
Landscape

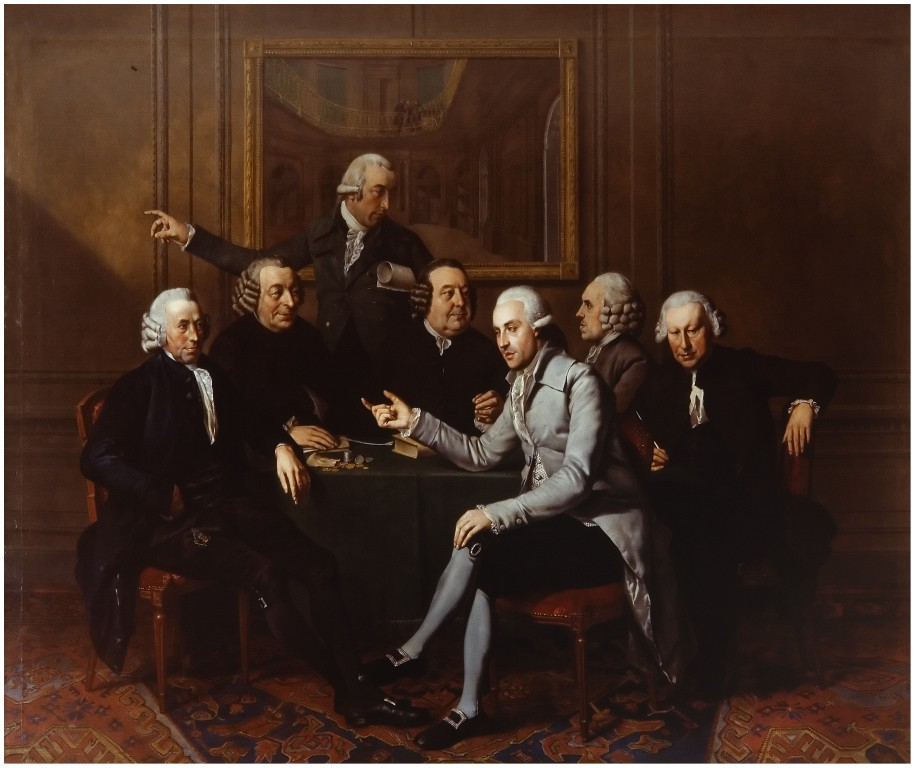
The Board of Teylers Foundation, 1786
