= List of members of Teylers Eerste Genootschap =

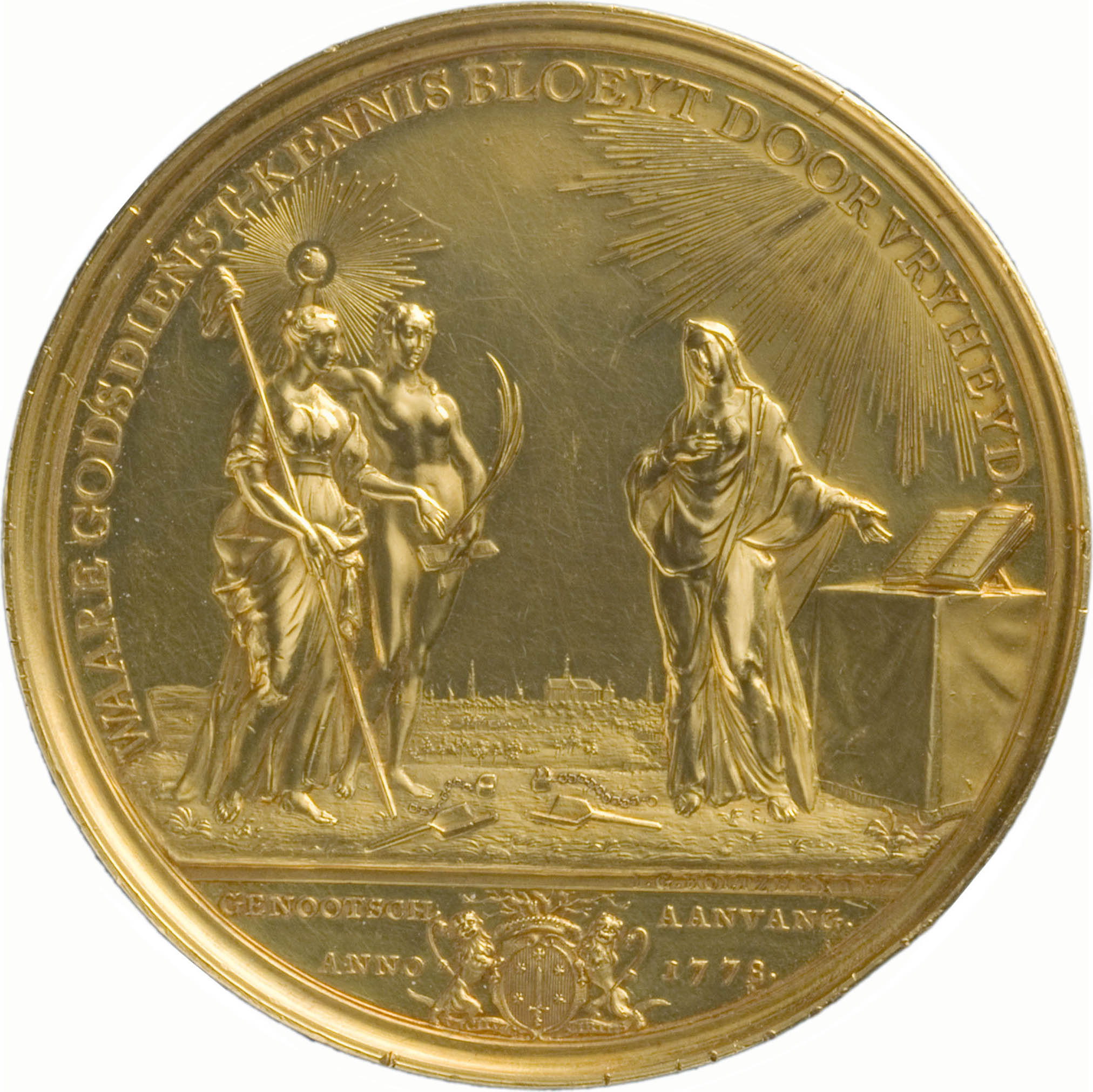
Competition medal of Teylers Theological Society in Haarlem, awarded to William Laurence Brown in 1784, gold (obverse) (Johann Georg Holtzhey)

This list contains all ordinary members of Teylers Eerste Genootschap (Teylers First Society). The total number of members varies over time. Appointments are for life, although the members can resign. From 1955 it became customary to resign at age 70, but to remain extraordinary members. Extraordinary members are not indicated. The years indicate their membership.

== Original appointed members ==
The members appointed by testament of Pieter Teyler van der Hulst:

- Age Wijnalda (1778 - 1792)
- Cornelis Loosjes (1778 - 1792)
- Klaas van der Horst (1778 - 1825)
- Jan Verbeek (1778 - 1788)
- Barend Hartman van Groningen (1778 - 1806)

== Later members ==
- Frederik Scheltinga (1778 - 1781)
- Jan van Walré (1781 - 1782)
- Willem van Kampen (1782 - 1783)
- Willem Brouwer Bosch (1783 - 1788)
- Petrus Loosjes Adz (1788 - 1813)
- Abraham Wijnands (1788 - 1805)
- Cornelis de Vries (1792 - 1812)
- Cornelis de Haan (1792 - 1793)
- Matthias van Geuns Jz (1793 - 1839)
- Abraham de Vries (1805 - 1862)
- François Huurkamp van der Vinne (1807 - 1815)
- Sybren Klazes Sybrandi (1812 - 1827), resigned to become director
- Adriaan Loosjes Pzn (1813 - 1818)
- Rinse Koopman (1815 - 1826)
- Matthijs Siegenbeek (1818 - 1854)
- Samuel Muller (1825 - 1875)
- Jan van Geuns (1826 - 1831), resigned
- Louis Philip Serrurier (1827 - 1844)
- Sytse Klaas de Waard (1832 - 1856)
- Klaas Sybrandi (1839 - 1858), resigned to become director
- Willem Carel Mauve (1844 - 1869)
- Jan van Gilse (1854 - 1859)
- Abraham Kuenen (1856 - 1891)
- Sytse Hoekstra Bzn (1858 - 1893), resigned
- Christiaan Sepp (1859 - 1890)
- Dirk Harting (1862 - 1889), resigned
- Hendrik Arend van Gelder (1869 - 1899)
- Jacob Giesbert de Hoop Scheffer (1875 - 1893)
- Cornelis Petrus Tiele (1889 - 1902)
- Samuel Cramer (1890 - 1913)
- Johannes Gerardus Rijk Acquoy (1892 - 1896)
- Izaak Jan de Bussy (1893 - 1911), resigned
- Jan Gerrit Boekenoogen (1894 - 1932), resigned
- Daniël E. J. Völter (1897 - 1927)
- Arnoldus Cornelis Duker (1899 - 1915)
- Hendrik Jan Elhorst (1902 - 1924)
- Pierre Henri Ritter (1912 - 1912)
- Pieter Feenstra (1913 - 1936)
- Albert Bruining (1913 - 1920)
- Tjeerd Cannegieter (1915 - 1927), resigned
- Hajo Uden Meyboom (1920 - 1932), resigned
- Johan Gerrit Appeldoorn (1924 - 1942), resigned
- Arjen Binnerts (1927 - 1932)
- Heinrich Friedrich Hackmann (1927 - 1934), resigned
- Wilhelmus Johannes Kühler (1932 - 1946)
- Cornelis Bonnes Hylkema (1932 - 1941), resigned
- Gustaaf Adolf van den Bergh van Eysinga (1933 - 1957)
- William Brede Kristensen (1934 - 1951)
- Jan Nicolaas Bakhuizen van den Brink (1936 - 1966)
- Albertus Wilhelmus Groenman (1942 - 1961)
- Willem Leendertz (1942 - 1961)
- Willem Frederik Golterman (1946 - 1968)
- Adriaan de Buck (1951 - 1959)
- Johannes Arnoldus Oosterbaan (1957 - ?)
- Jan Nicolaas Sevenster (1959 - 1971)
- Martinus Adrianus Beek (1961 - ?)
- Jan Zandzee (1961 - ?)
- Willem Frederik Dankbaar (1967 - 1977)
- Irvin Buckwalter Horst (1968 - ?)
- Marinus de Jonge (1971 - ?)
- Hendrik Bernardus Kossen (1978 - ?)
