= Age Wijnalda =

Dutch teacher and minister

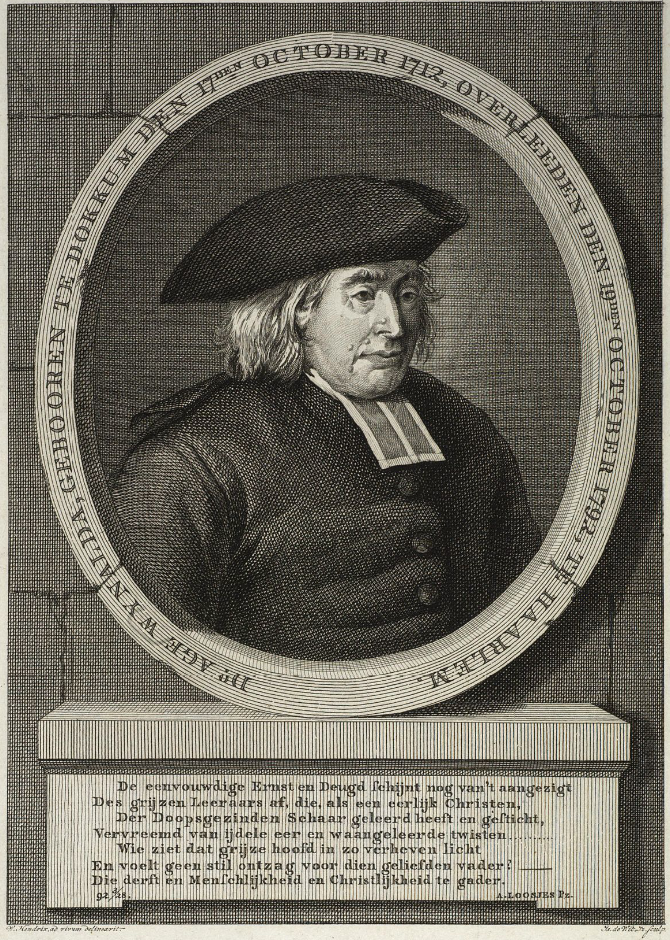
Age Wijnalda, drawn by Wybrand Hendriks 28 March 1792, with a verse by Adriaan Loosjes mentioning the Doopsgezinde Schaar, engraved by Isaac de Wit

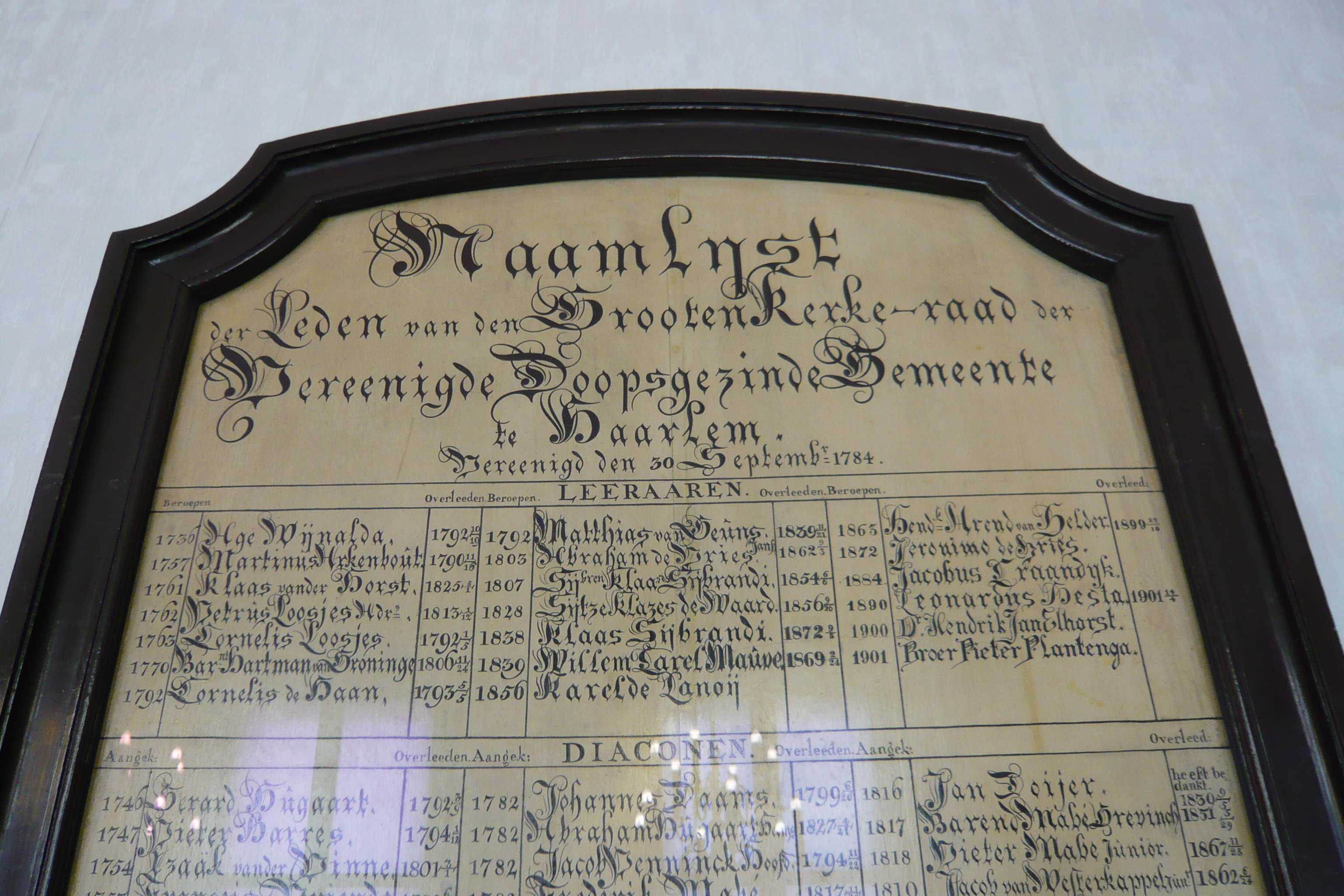
Age Wijnalda's name as "teacher, called 1736" as the first name on the list of teachers in the Doopsgezinde kerk, Haarlem

Sir Age Pieters Wijnalda (Dokkum, 17 October 1712 – Haarlem, 19 October 1792) was a Dutch Mennonite teacher, minister and one of the first members of Teylers Eerste Genootschap (Teylers First or Theological Society) from 1778 until his death. He was the founder of the "Doopsgezinde Schaar" (a Mennonite institution). He had at least one son, named IJnze Wijnalda.

Age Wijnalda was the second son of Pieter Harmens and was knighted by and received a crest from the King of Great Britain for services to the crown – presumably for bravery in battle, since there is a helm on his coat of arms. He was trained at the Remonstrant seminary of Amsterdam and first served in Emden (1733–1736) before moving to Haarlem.
