= Cornelis Loosjes =

Dutch Mennonite teacher and minister

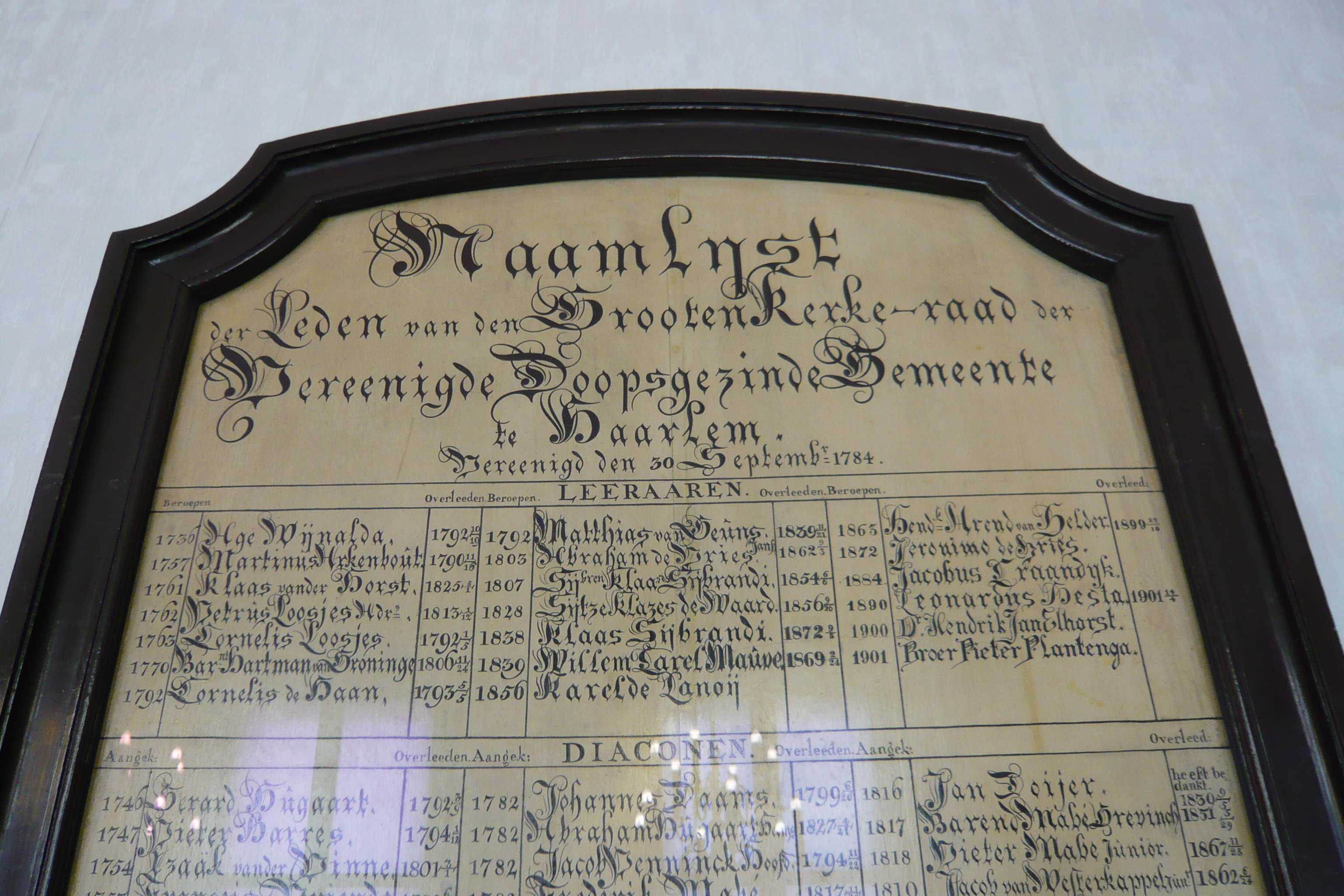
Cornelis Loosjes' name as "teacher, called 1763" under his brother's name

Cornelis Loosjes (Zaandam, 28 January 1723 - Haarlem, 5 January 1792) was a Dutch Mennonite teacher and minister. He was among the first members of Teylers Eerste Genootschap (Teylers First or Theological Society) from 1778 until his death.

Cornelis was son of Adriaan Loosjes and Guurtje Klaasd. Visser, and the brother of Petrus Loosjes. First, he was Mennonite teacher and minister in Gouda during the years 1744-1751, after that from 1751-1763 he was minister of the Mennonites of the East side in Zaandam, but in 1763 he moved to the congregation in Haarlem in the Peuzelaarsteeg. Loosjes was founder of the magazine Vaderlandsche Letteroefeningen for which he wrote book reviews and was critical towards in his view exaggerated praise. He was friends with the Dutch writer Elisabeth Wolff who claimed he had a significant influence on her development.
