= Sytse Klaas de Waard =

Dutch Mennonite minister (1796–1856)

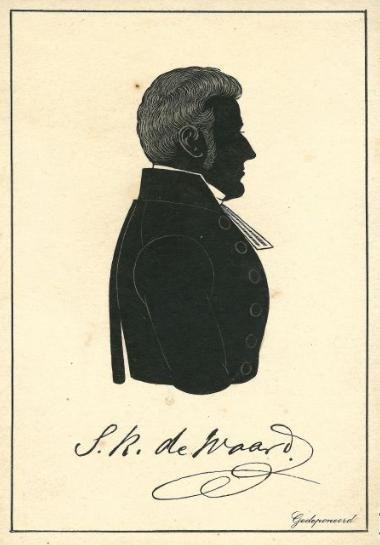
Sijtze Klazes de Waard

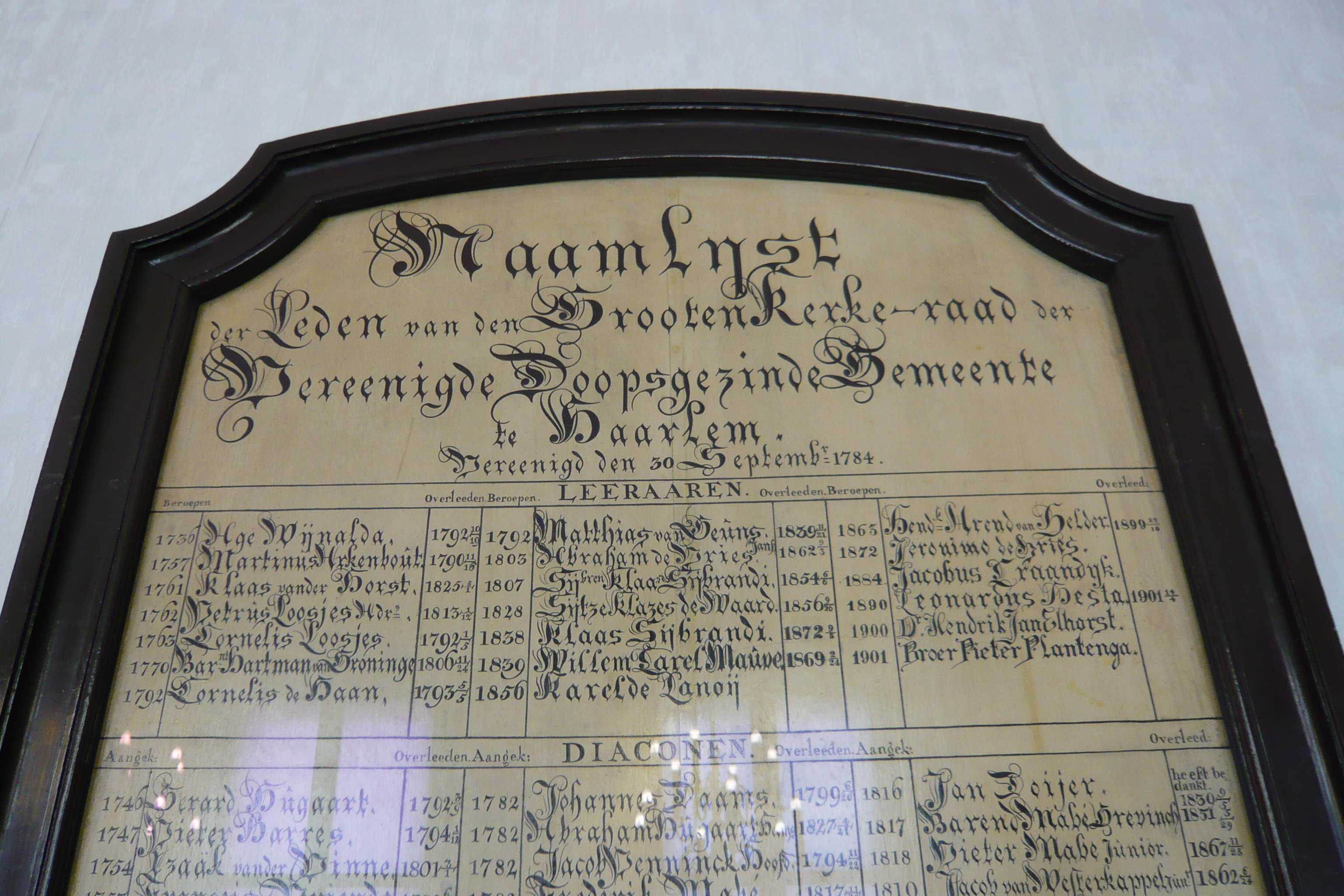
Sijtze Klazes de Waard's name as "teacher, called 1828" in the Doopsgezinde kerk, Haarlem

Sijtze Klaas de Waard (1796, Groningen – 17 June 1856, Haarlem) was a Dutch Mennonite teacher and minister.

He was trained at the Amsterdam Mennonite seminary and first served in Mensingeweer (1821-1826) and Akkrum (1826–1828) before serving in Doopsgezinde Church, Haarlem. Sybrandi gave three addresses to the Haarlem society Maatschappij tot Nut van't Algemeen. From 1832 until his death in 1856 he was also a member of the Teylers First Society.
