= Sybren Klazes Sybrandi =

Dutch Mennonite teacher and minister

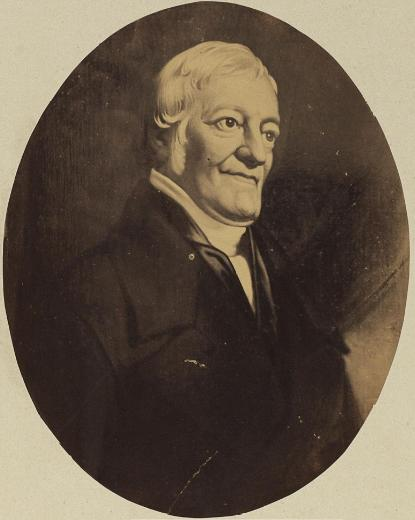
Sybren Klazes Sybrandi

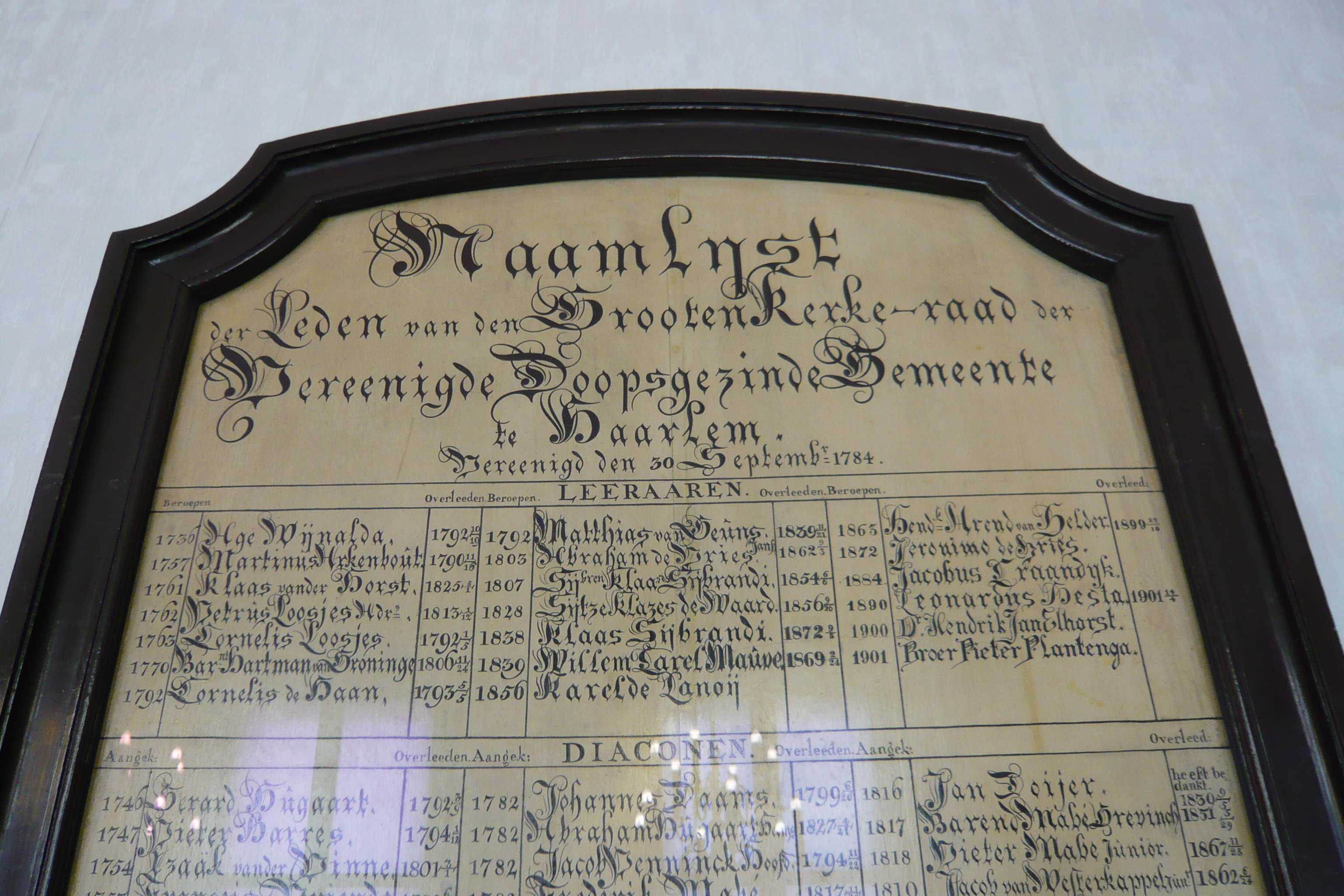
Sybrandi's name as "teacher, called 1807" in the Doopsgezinde kerk, Haarlem

Sybren Klazes Sybrandi (1772, Leeuwarden – 17 June, 1854, Haarlem) was a Dutch Mennonite teacher and minister.

He was trained at the Amsterdam Mennonite seminary and first served in Nijmegen (1805-1807) before moving to Haarlem where he became the father of the Sybrandi family of Haarlem Mennonites. Sybrandi served in Haarlem in the church and the Algemeene Doopsgezinde Sociëteit (ADS) until retirement in 1849. From 1812 he was also a member of the Teylers First Society. He resigned in 1827 to become a director of Teylers Stichting. His son Klaas Sybrandi later also filled these positions.
