= Van Groningen =

Van Groningen is a Dutch surname. Notable people with the surname include:

- Barend Hartman van Groningen
- Gert van Groningen, 16th century Danish sculptor
- Jan Swart van Groningen (c. 1495–c. 1563), Dutch painter
- Steven van Groningen (born 1957), Dutch rower
- Wies van Groningen (née Louise Metaal) (1929–2022), Moluccan Dutch writer.
