= Hendrik Jan Elhorst =

Dutch Mennonite teacher and minister

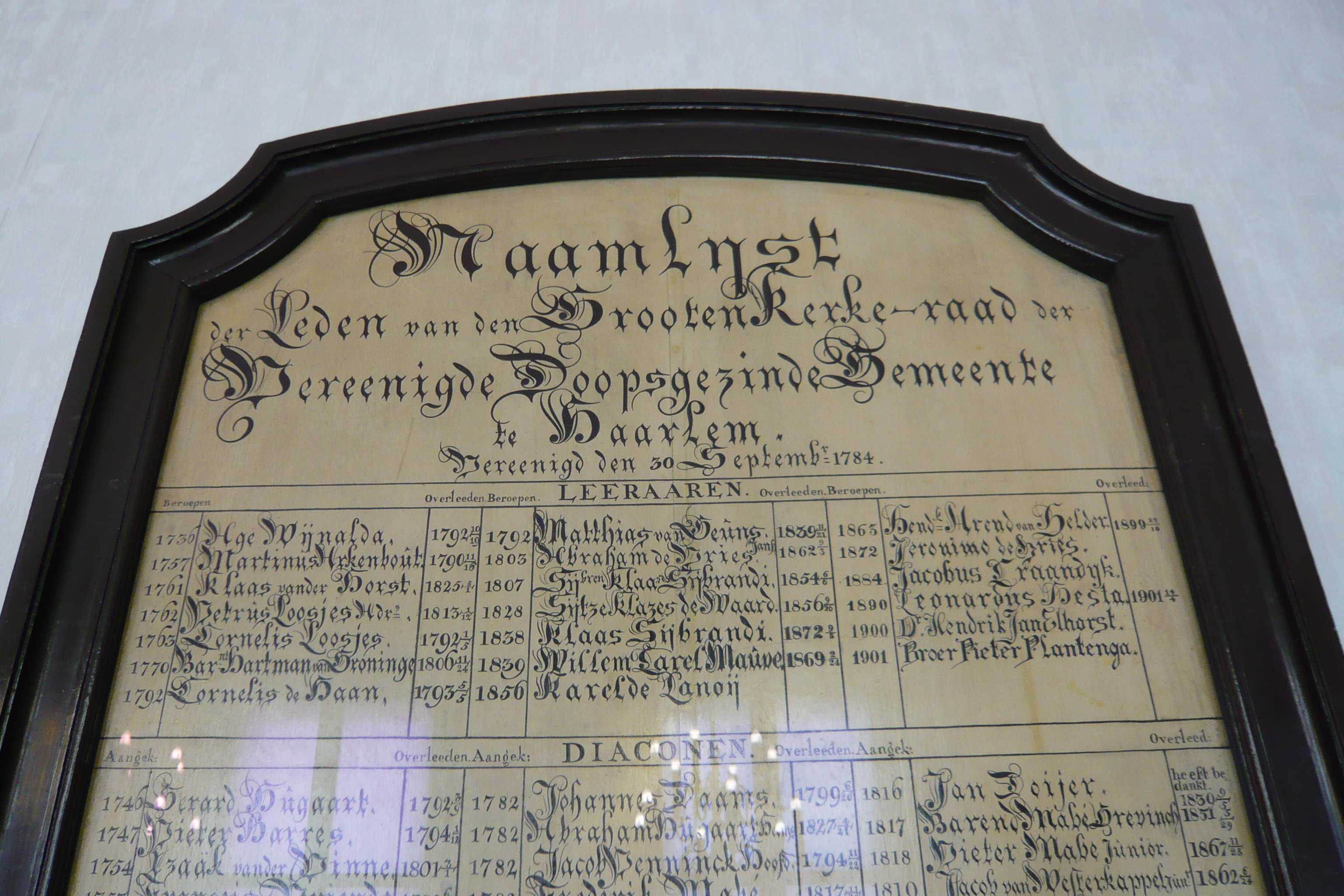
Hendrik Jan Elhorst's name as "teacher, called 1900" in the Doopsgezinde kerk, Haarlem

Hendrik Jan Elhorst (29 October 1861, Wisch, Gelderland – 21 March 1924, Amsterdam) was a Dutch Mennonite teacher and minister.

He was trained at the gymnasium in Deventer and then at the Amsterdam Mennonite seminary and first served in Irnsum (Friesland) 1887-1888, Arnhem 1888-1898, The Hague 1898-1900, before being called in 1900 to serve in the Doopsgezinde kerk, Haarlem, where he became a member of the Teylers First Society in 1902. Van Gelder became a professor in the University of Amsterdam 1906-1924. He was one of the founders and editors of Teylers Theologisch Tijdschrift.
