= Cornelis de Vries =

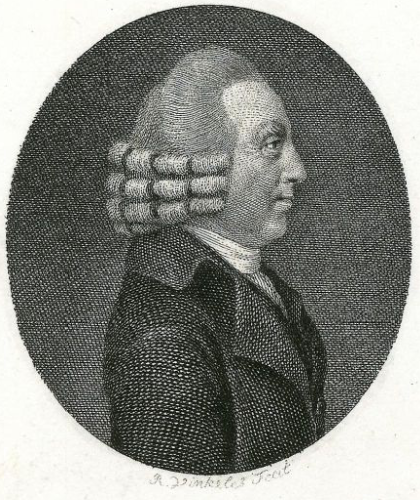
Cornelis de Vries by Reinier Vinkeles, ca. 1802, published in his obituary in 1813 by Jan van Geuns

Cornelis de Vries (16 August 1740, Koog aan de Zaan – 21 November 1812, Haarlem), was a Mennonite minister.

== Biography ==
He was educated at the Amsterdam Mennonite seminary and served the congregations of Enschede (1763-1771) and Utrecht (1771-1786), where he started the Utrechtse Courant in 1782, a newspaper he edited himself. He then retired to devote more time to writing and studies and moved to Haarlem in 1788. There he became friendly with Adriaan Loosjes, with whom he started the Algemeene Konst- en Letterbode voor meer of min geoefenden. He first married Alida Reesen, and after she died he married Maria Elisabeth van Vollenhove (1730–1811), the widow of the Remonstrant pastor Jan Verbeek, one of the founding members of Teylers First Society, which also de Vries joined from 1792 and remained a member of until his death. He wrote several religious works, including a catechism for children.
