= Willem Carel Mauve =

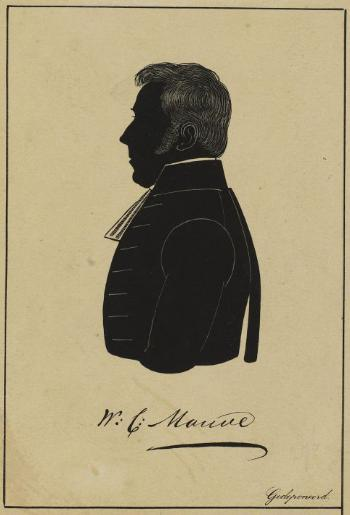
Willem Carel Mauve

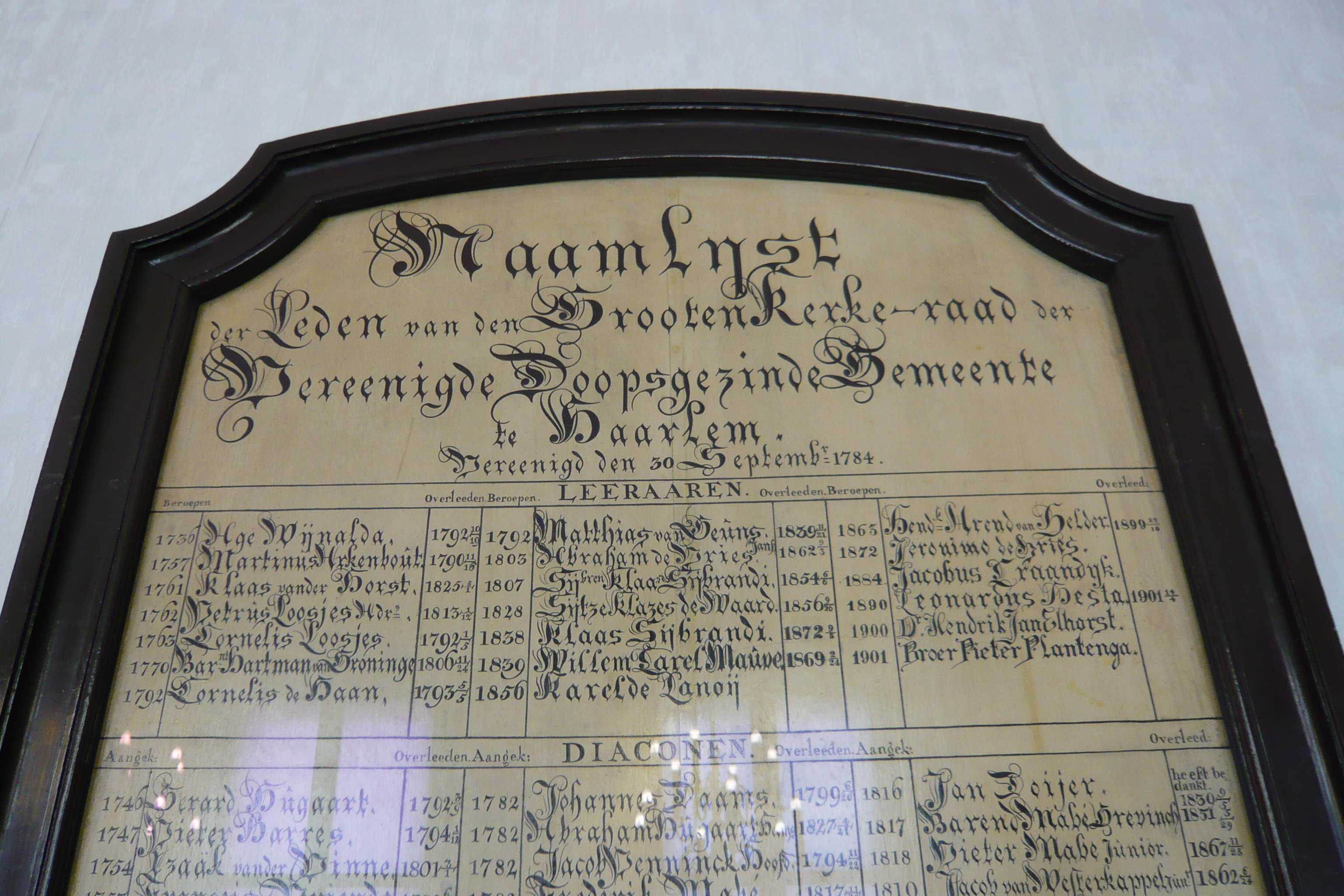
Willem Carel Mauve's name as "teacher, called 1839" in the Doopsgezinde kerk, Haarlem

Willem Carel Mauve (2 February 1803, Rotterdam – 24 February 1869, Haarlem), was a Dutch Mennonite minister and writer. He was the father of the painter Anton Mauve.

== Biography ==
He served the congregations of Enschede from 1830 until 1836 and served in Zaandam (where his son Anton was born) before moving to Haarlem in 1839. There he became a member of Teylers First Society in 1844. He wrote several religious works, including a small catechism on Biblical history.
