= Klaas Sybrandi =

Dutch Mennonite minister, author and translator

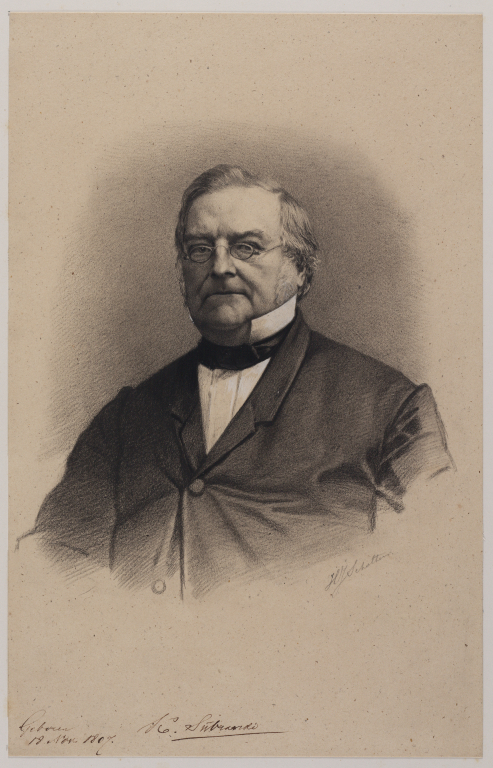
Portrait of Sybrandi by Hendrik Jacobus Scholten

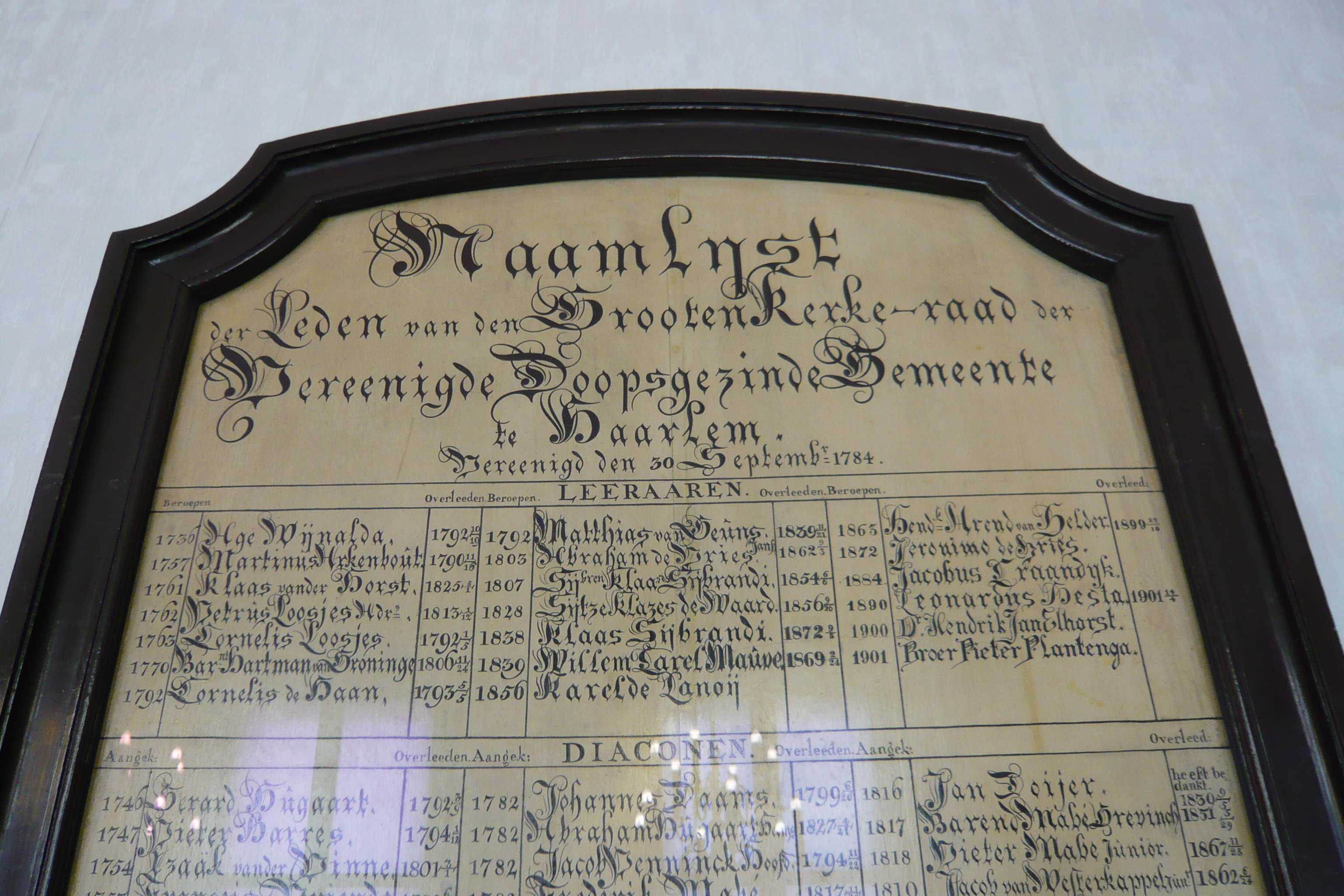
Sybrandi's name as "teacher, called 1838" two names down from his father's

Klaas Sybrandi (Haarlem, 18 November 1807 - Haarlem, 4 September 1872), also spelled as Sijbrandi, was a Dutch Mennonite minister, author and translator who was involved with several societies and foundations.

Sybrandi was born as son of the Haarlem Mennonite minister Sybren Klazes Sybrandi and enjoyed a privileged education. First he attended Latin school in Haarlem, and was then, 17 years of age, admitted 'with high expectations' at the Kweekschool der algemeene Doopsgezinde Societeit te Amsterdam (Seminary of the General Mennonite Society in Amsterdam) where he developed an affection for classical literature - supposedly larger than his interest in theology. In 1827 he was promoted to doctor in literature at the Leidsche Hoogeschool.

In 1830 he became minister of the Mennonite congregation in Nijmegen (in the far east of the Netherlands). In 1832 he refused a position in Middelburg (in the far southwest) but in 1834 he did accept a new position in Groningen, a university city in the north of the country, to lead the congregation there. In 1838 he finally moved back to his home town to become minister at the Doopsgezinde Church, Haarlem. Already in Nijmegen he had published some works about literature and in Groningen he made friends with the university teachers there. In 1841 his work Verhandeling over Vondel en Shakespear als Treurspeldichters was awarded a gold medal by Teylers Tweede Genootschap (Teylers Second or Scientific society) and he became the main editor of Konst- en Letterbode until 1853 (following the sudden death of the previous main editor, Vincent Loosjes). He initially only planned to do this for a short while but then continued to do so and wrote many pieces for the literary magazine - several of which anonymously.

Sybrandi was above all however a minister and Mennonite teacher, and spoke out against the unification of all Protestant churches into one single church. Shortly after his arrival in Haarlem Sybrandi became a member of Teylers Eerste Genootschap (Teylers First or Theological Society), and after the death of his father in 1858 he would succeed him as director at the Teylers Stichting (Teylers Foundation). In 1844 he joined the Algemeene Doopsgezinde Sociëteit (General Mennonite Society) of which he would become chairman of the board in 1849/1850 and 1857/1858. He was also a member of the Maatschappij van Nederlandsche Letterkunde (Society of Dutch Literature) in Leiden.

Sybrandi retired in 1871 (although he feared modernist successors) and died in 1872. He married the daughter of Mennonite minister Nicolaas Swart, but they did not have any children.

== Works ==
A non-exhaustive list of Sybrandi's publications:

- Verhandeling, over vrouwe K.W. Bilderdijk, beschouwd als kinderdichteres. Door K. Sybrandi. In: Vaderlandsche letteroefeningen. (1834)
- De Peri en het Paradijs (translation from English: Thomas Moore, Lalla Rookh - before 1835)
- De val der Engelen (translation from English: Thomas Moore, The loves of the angels - 1835)
- Leerrede, ter gelegenheid der godsdienstige gedachtenisviering van het honderdjarig bestaan der Doopsgezinde kweekschool. Door K. Sijbrandi, Leeraar bij de Doopsgezinden te Groningen. In: Vaderlandsche letteroefeningen (1836)
- Handleiding tot het geven van huisselijk onderrigt in de godsdienst (translation from German: Wilhelm Busch)
- Proeve over en in den trant van den Engelschen dichter George Grabbe. Door K. Sijbrandi. (Eene Voorlezing.) In: Vaderlandsche letteroefeningen (1840)
- Iets over Laura Bridgman, de doofstomme blinde. In: Vaderlandsche letteroefeningen (1844)
- Iets ter nagedachtenis van mijnen schoonvader Nicolaas Swart, door K. Sijbrandi. In: Vaderlandsche letteroefeningen (1846)
- Levensberigt van Hendrik Arnold Meijer. In: Jaarboek van de Maatschappij der Nederlandse Letterkunde (1854)
- Proeve uit eene vertaling van De kerk-registers, van G. Crabbe. Door K. Sijbrandi. In: Vaderlandsche letteroefeningen (1857)
- Nog eene proeve uit Crabbe's gedicht: De kerk-registers. Door K. Sijbrandi. In: Vaderlandsche letteroefeningen (1857)
- De Tales of the hall van George Crabbe, door Dr. K. Sijbrandi. In: Vaderlandsche letteroefeningen (1870)
- Brieven aan eene vriendin (translation from German: Wilhelm von Humboldt)
- Käthi of de weg door allen nood (translation from German: Wilhelm von Humboldt)
- De pausen in de zestiende en zeventiende eeuw (translation from German: Leopold von Ranke)
