= Barend Hartman van Groningen =

Dutch minister

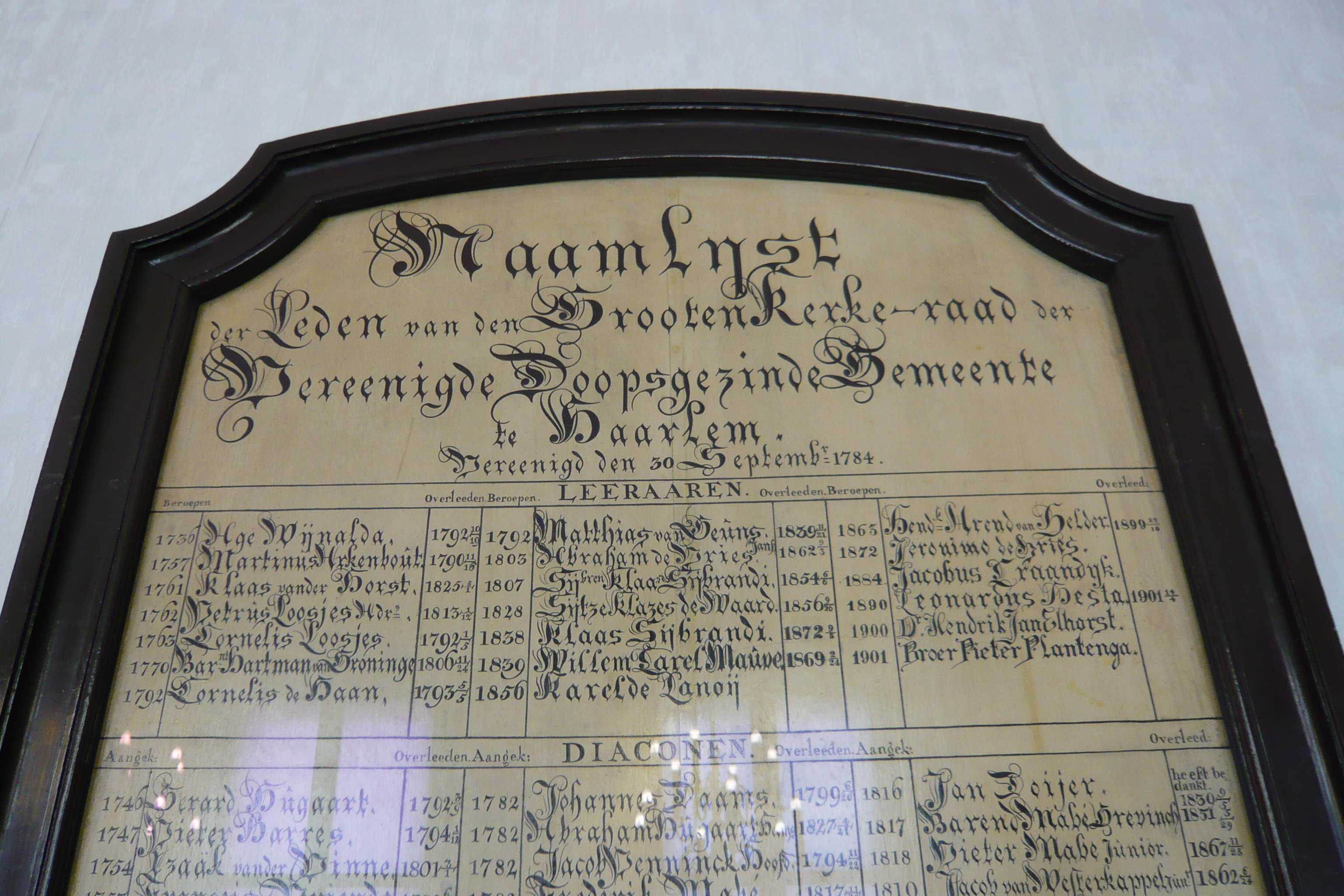
Barend Hartman van Groningen's name as "teacher, called 1770" in the Doopsgezinde kerk, Haarlem

Barend Hartman van Groningen (before 1745 - 24 November 1806) was a Dutch Mennonite teacher and minister.

Barend served first in Haarlem at the Vlaamse Blok from 1761-1784, and later at the Doopsgezinde kerk, Haarlem from 1784-1806. During his service the congregations of the Haarlem Mennonite community were united (the largest were Vlaamse Blok and Waterlanders) in 1784 and the sermon on this occasion based on John 15:14 was given by his colleague Klaas van der Horst.

He was friends with Pieter Teyler van der Hulst and was named in his will as a member of the Teylers First Society, a position which he filled from 1778 until he died in 1806.

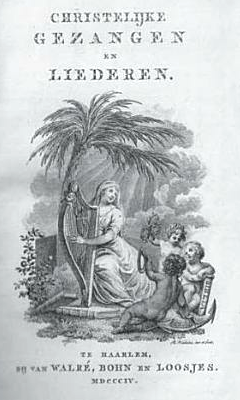
Songbook published in 1804 with 74 lyrics by Aagje Deken and forward signed by Hartman van Groningen
