= Petrus Loosjes =

Dutch writer and Mennonite minister

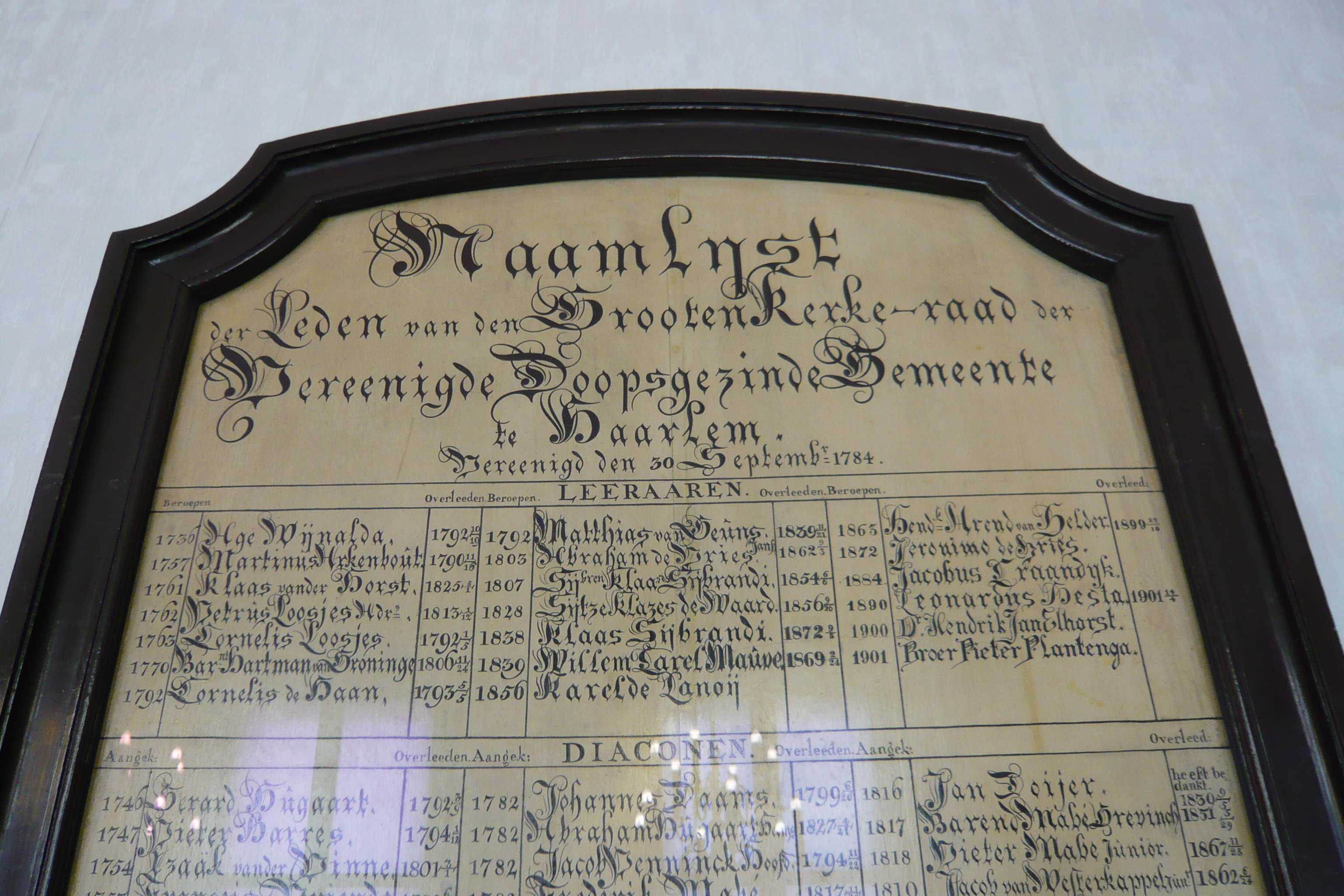
Petrus Loosjes' name as "teacher, called 1762" above his brother's name

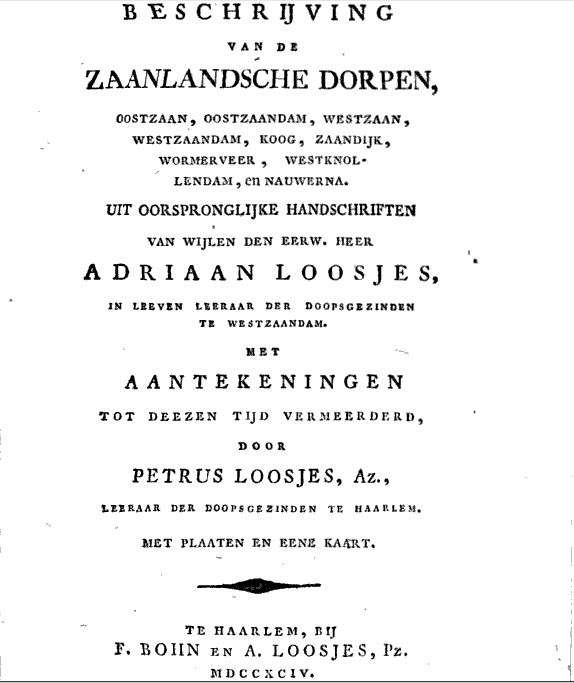
Title page of Description of the Zaanlandsche villages by Adriaan Loosjes the Elder, 1794

Petrus Loosjes (20 November 1735, Zaandam – 12 January 1813, Haarlem), was an 18th-century writer and Mennonite minister from the Northern Netherlands.

== Biography ==
He and his brother Cornelis Loosjes were the sons of Adriaan Loosjes the Elder (1689-1767). Adriaan, who was born and died in Westzaandam, originally was a lumber dealer but was chosen a Mennonite minister for his community in 1714, in which position he served until 1762. Petrus published his father's historical notes on the villages of the Zaanstreek in 1794.

Petrus trained at the Amsterdam Mennonite Lamist Seminary from 1754-1759 and married Jozina (Sijtje) Oudt, also from Zaandam, in 1760 in his hometown. From 1759 to 1762 he was a preacher in Den Hoorn on the island of Texel, where his oldest son Adriaan Loosjes was born. After a brief stay in Monnickendam in 1762, he became minister at the Doopsgezinde Church, Haarlem. His brother Cornelis did likewise the next year. Petrus translated several books from English into Dutch, and wrote a book on natural history as proof of the wonders of God. During the years 1771-1775, he translated Johann Lorenz von Mosheim's history of the church.

In 1778, he wrote an essay in response to the first prize question posed by the Teylers Eerste Genootschap that was founded the same year, and he was awarded a silver medal. He joined that society and later became secretary, in which capacity he was succeeded by his son Adriaan. In 1786, he started working on the first sequel to Jan Wagenaar's Vaderlandsche Geschiedenis, which he continued into his later years, while publishing other books with his son.

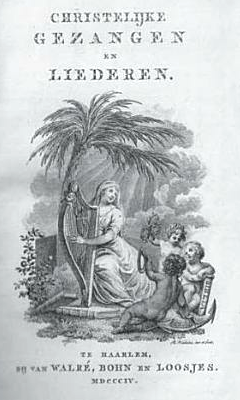
Songbook published in 1804 with 74 lyrics by Aagje Deken and forward signed by father and son Loosjes.
