= Klaas van der Horst =

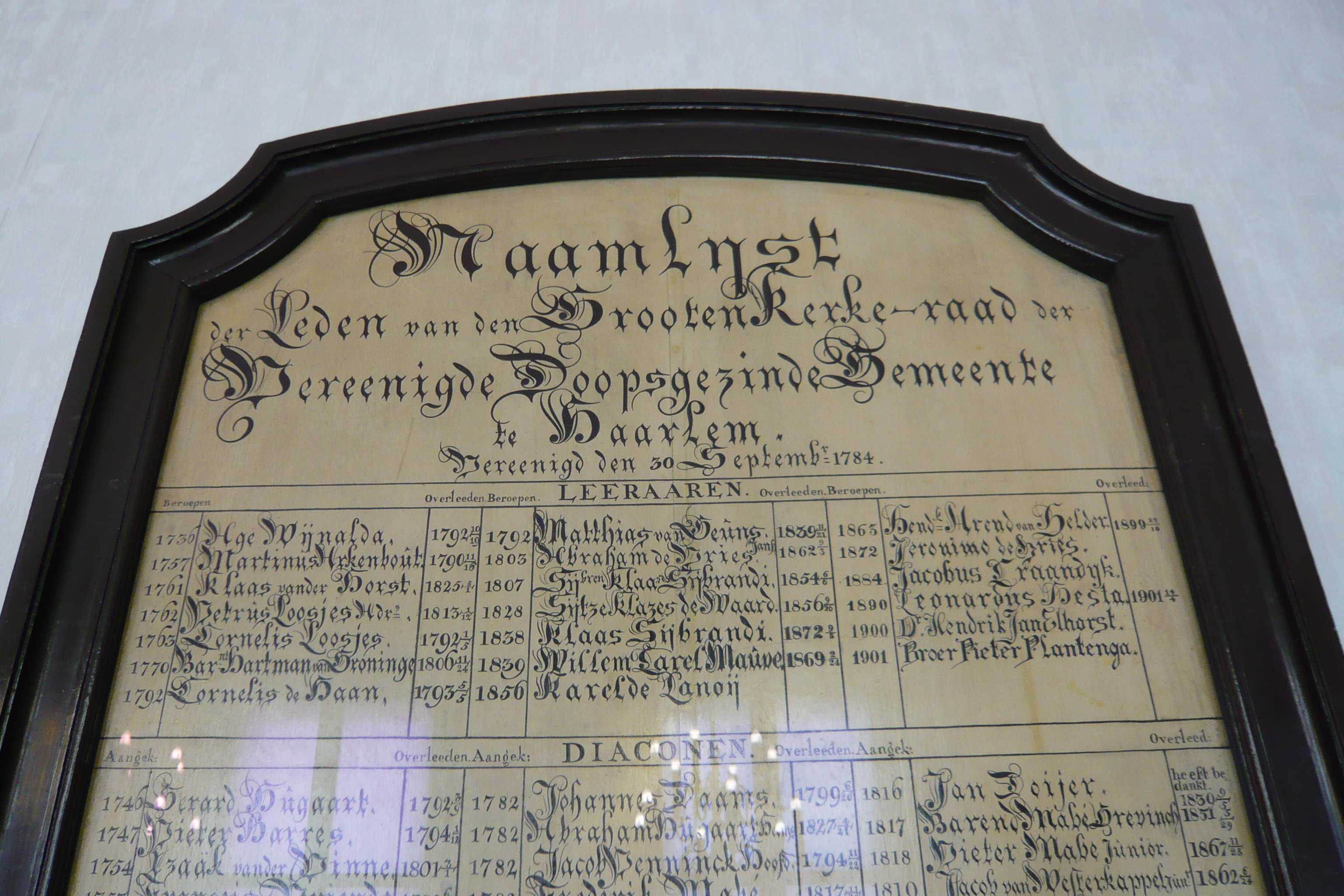
Klaas van der Horst' name as "teacher, called 1761" in the Doopsgezinde kerk, Haarlem

Klaas van der Horst (Amsterdam, 15 September 1731 - Haarlem, 1 May 1825) was a Dutch Mennonite teacher and minister.

Klaas was trained at the Mennonite seminary in Amsterdam, and served in Goes 1752-1757, Zwolle 1757, and Leiden 1757-1761 before moving to the Doopsgezinde kerk, Haarlem where he served 1761-1825. During his service the congregations of the Haarlem Mennonite community were united (the largest were Vlaamse Blok and Waterlanders) in 1784 and the sermon he gave on this occasion based on John 15:14 was published by his friend Adriaan Loosjes.

He had been friends with Pieter Teyler van der Hulst and was named in his will as member of the Teylers First Society, a position which he filled from 1778 until his death in 1825. He lived to a great age.

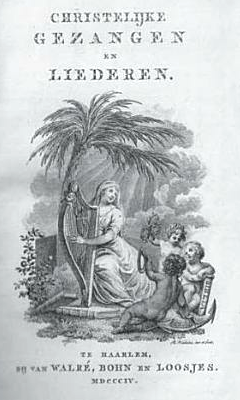
Songbook published in 1804 with 74 lyrics by Aagje Deken and forward signed by van der Horst
