= Hendrik Arend van Gelder =

Dutch Mennonite teacher and minister

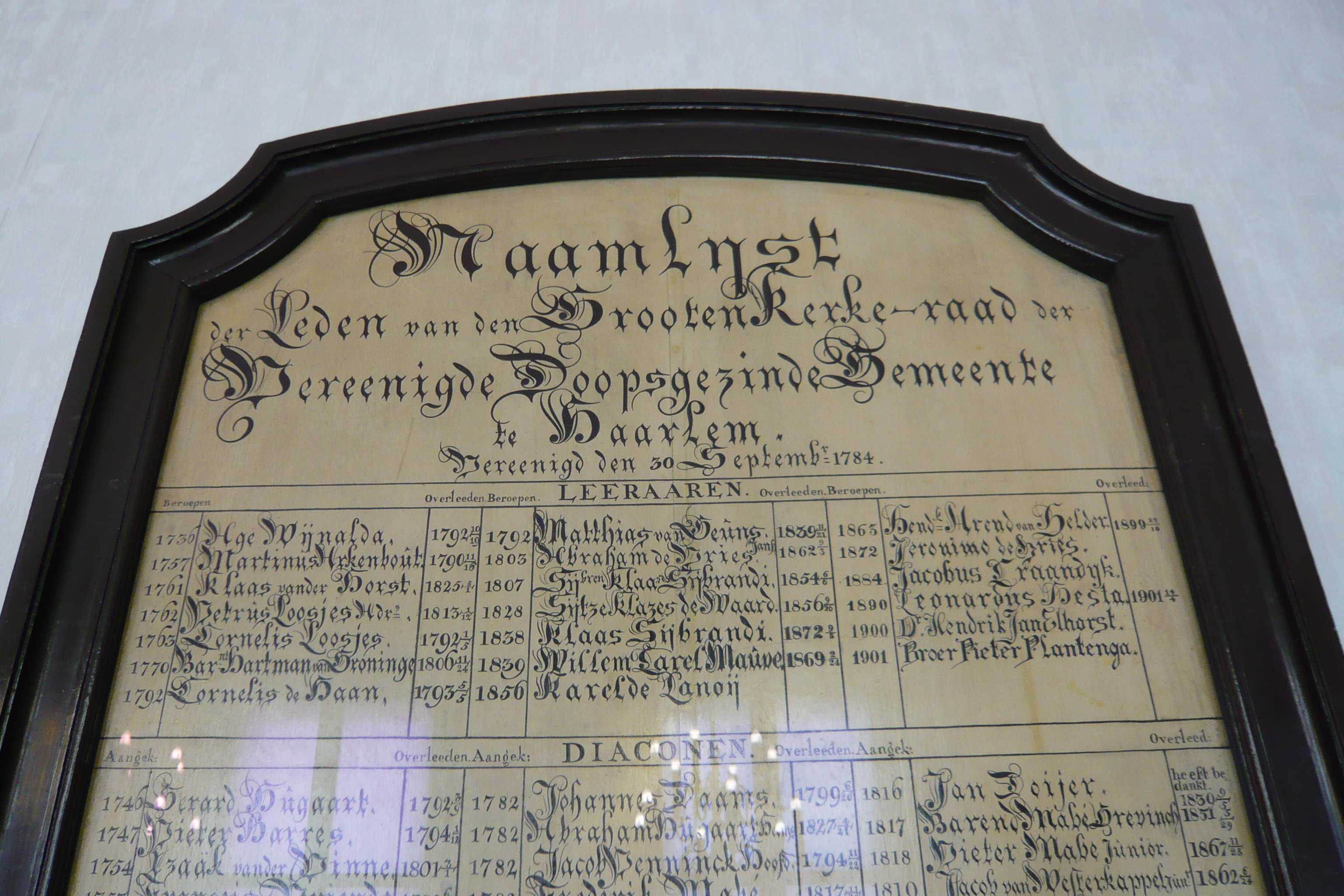
Hendrik Arend van Gelder's name as "teacher, called 1863" in the Doopsgezinde kerk, Haarlem

Hendrik Arend van Gelder (3 November 1825, in Wormerveer – 17 June 1899, in Haarlem) was a Dutch Mennonite teacher and minister.

Van Gelder was the son of the paper maker Hendrik van Gelder and Aagtje Mats. He was trained at the Amsterdam Mennonite seminary and first served in Mensingeweer 1851–1853. He married Rinske Feikema of Franeker in 1853 in her birthplace. Van Gelder then served at Medemblik 1853–1855, Drachten-Ureterp 1855–1858, and Bolsward 1858-1863 before being called in 1863 to serve in the Doopsgezinde kerk, Haarlem. Van Gelder wrote a history of the Mennonites in Haarlem that was never published. From 1869 till his death 30 years later, he was also a member of the Teylers First Society.
