= Jacob Haafner =

German-Dutch travel writer (1754–1809)

Jacob Gotfried Haafner
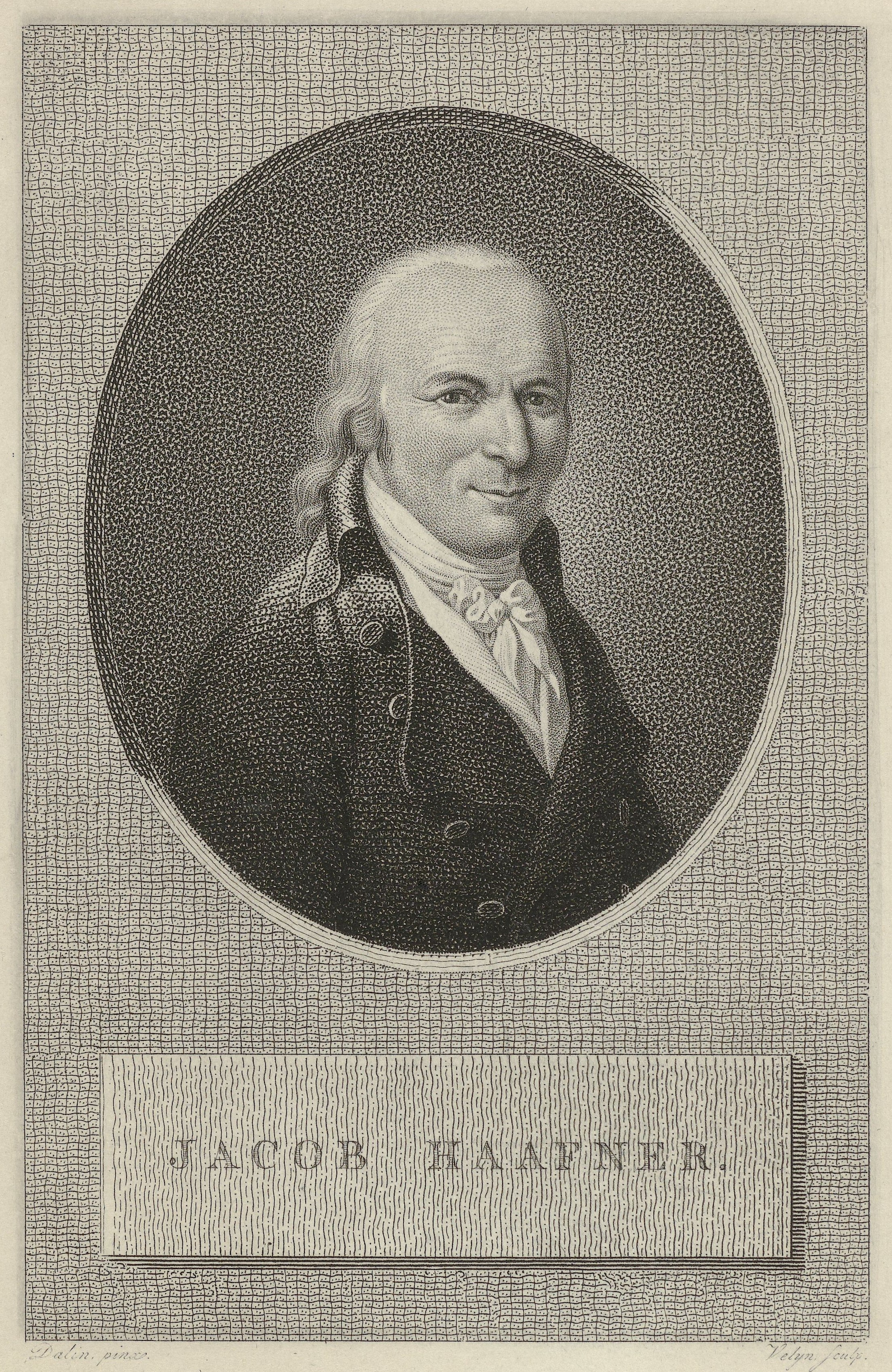
- Haafner in 1805
- Born: 13 May 1754; Halle, Holy Roman Empire
- Died: 4 September 1809 (aged 55); Amsterdam, Netherlands
- Citizenship: Dutch
- Occupations: Travel writer, bookkeeper
- Notable work: Travels in a Palanquin (1808, two volumes)
- Spouse: A.M. Kreunink (m. 1791)
- Parent: Matthias Haafner

Jacob Gotfried Haafner (Halle, 13 May 1754 – Amsterdam, 4 September 1809) was a German-Dutch travel writer who lived in and wrote extensively on India and Ceylon. His travelogues were noted for their Romantic undertones, lively descriptions of Indian cultures and peoples, as well as criticisms of European colonialism, slavery, and cultural domination.

In 1805, Haafner entered the annual essay contest organized by Teylers Eerste Genootschap (English: Teylers Theological Society). His anti-colonialist, counter-missionary treatise, titled Onderzoek naar het nut der zendelingen en zendelings-genootschappen (English: Examination of the usefulness of missionaries and missionary societies), was selected as winner and published in 1807 amidst public consternation.

== Early life (1754–1771) ==
Jacob Gotfried Haafner was born in Halle, Holy Roman Empire on 13 May 1754 to a French father and a German mother. The family moved to Emden in northwest Germany where Jacob's father, Matthias, worked as a ship's surgeon for the Emden Company, then to Amsterdam in 1763, when he joined the Dutch East India Company. Shortly before arriving in Cape Town on a trip to Asia in 1766, however, Matthias Haffner died, leaving 12-year-old Jacob in the care of a foster family in the Cape Colony.

In 1768, Jacob Haafner enlisted as a cabin boy on a ship bound for Batavia (modern Jakarta, then capital of the Dutch East Indies). There, he worked as a tutor to the children of a high-ranking VOC official. In 1770, he returned to Amsterdam and became an apprentice to painter and engraver Reinier Vinkeles.

== Life in India (1771-1787) ==
In June 1771, Haafner enlisted as a VOC servant and departed for Nagapattinam, the capital of Dutch Coromandel from 1660 to 1781. Tired of the sailor's life, he settled in the town and worked in the factory as an assistant bookkeeper from 1773 to 1778, learning Tamil and conducting private trade on the side. In 1779, he was appointed as secretary-bookkeeper to a branch office in Sadraspatnam.

During the Fourth Anglo-Dutch War (1780–1784), he was taken prisoner and held in Madras, where he witnessed the struggle between the British army and Hyder Ali, the Sultan and de facto ruler of the Kingdom of Mysore, and the famine that crippled the city in 1782. Released at the end of the year, he arrived at Ceylon (present-day Sri Lanka) in early 1783. From June to September, he embarked on a hiking tour of the island from Jaffnapatnam to Colombo, then left for Calcutta in West Bengal.

At the centre of British colonial administration, he found work as a bookkeeper to the former Governor of Benares, Joseph Fowke. Having developed a profound interest in Indian culture and studied a variety of Indian languages (Tamil, Urdu, Hindi, Telugu, and Sanskrit), he became acquainted with The Asiatic Society, founded in 1784 by Sir William Jones. In 1786, he traveled southwards along the Coromandel coast through Tamil Nadu and Orissa, covering more than 600 miles by palanquin. From January to September, he visited shrines and temples, making drawings of ancient monuments such as the temple ruins at Mammallapuram, which he called "one of the most beautiful and largest palaces of [his] time" and compared with the "miracles of Egypt".

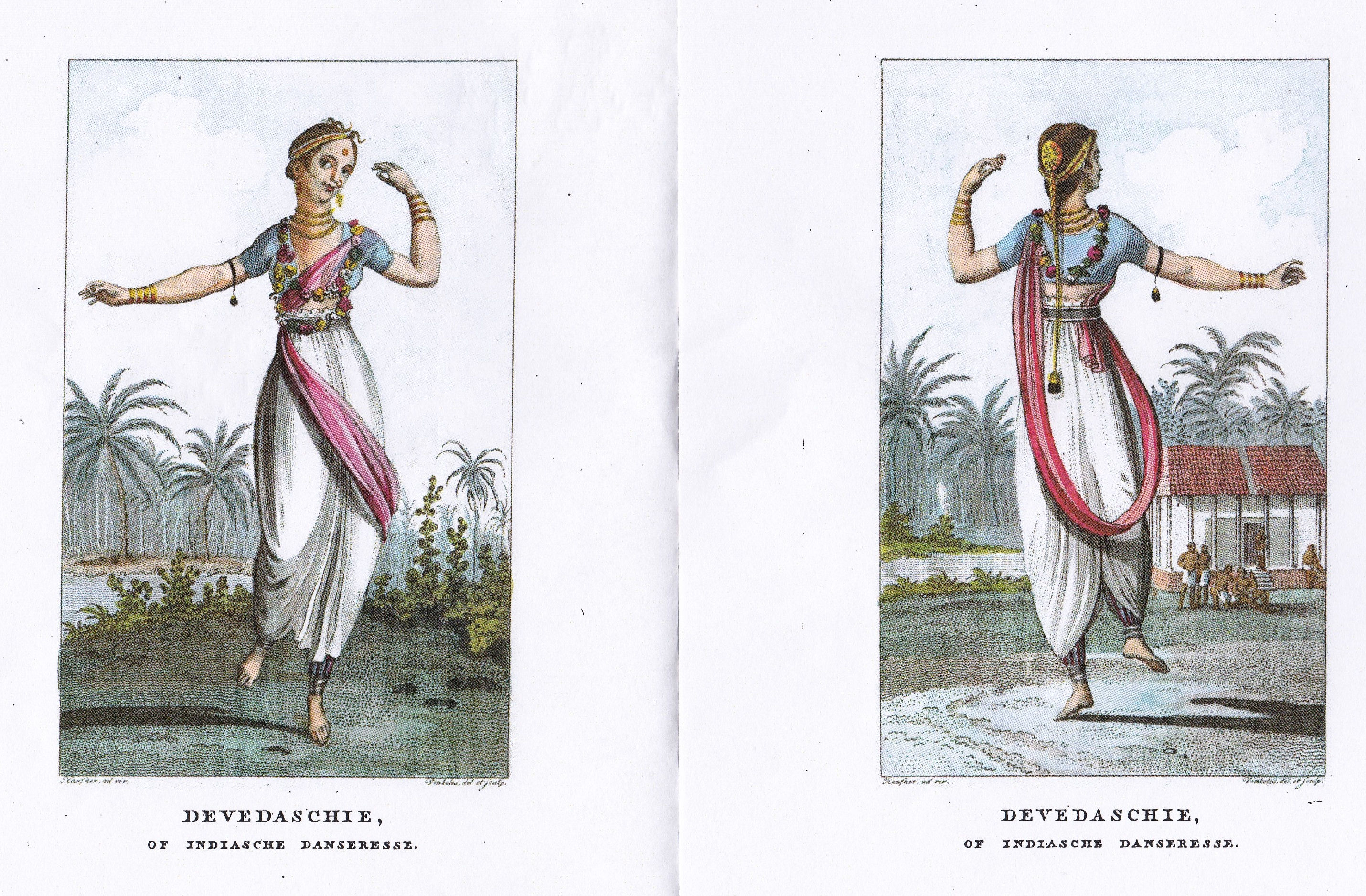
Haafner's drawings of a temple dancer

The result of this journey is described in Reize in eenen Palanquin (English: Travels in a palanquin), a narrative work of 2 volumes on the Indian landscape, people, religious customs, and ancient architecture. To a certain extent, the writer idealized the subcontinent while criticizing the English, among others, for causing havoc and suffering among the local population: "Rascals, squanderers, criminals, bankrupts, and other bad people, every one runs to the Indies, to oppress the poor Indians, to plunder them, and to kill them."

The tragic death of Mamia, a temple dancer with whom Haafner had fallen in love, ended his journey. He departed shortly afterwards, traveling via Mauritius, the Cape of Good Hope, France, and Germany, back to Amsterdam in 1790.

== Writing in Amsterdam (1787–1809) ==
Upon his return to Europe, Haafner invested his fortune in French bonds, which became almost worthless after the Revolution. To provide for his family, he opened a pipe shop. In 1796, he applied unsuccessfully for a job with the directors of the Dutch East India Company.

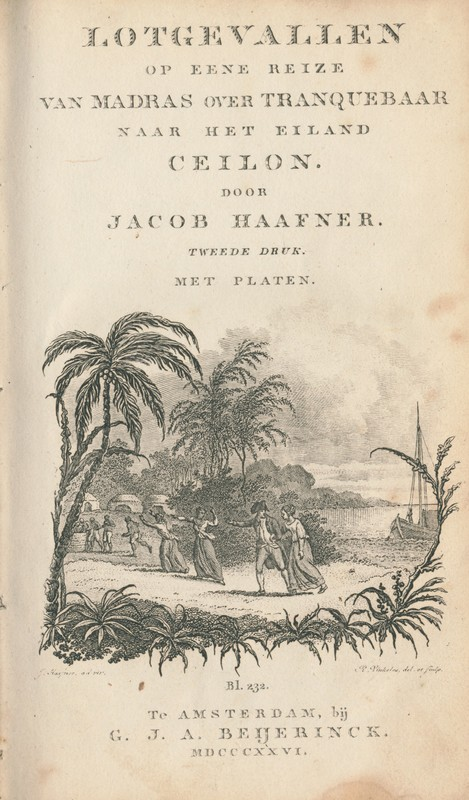
Cover of Adventures on a Journey from Madras via Tranquebar to Ceylon (1806)

His travel stories were published between 1806 and 1821, of which three were published posthumously by his eldest son, Christian Mathias. Together, the five travelogues constituted an autobiography:

- Lotgevallen en vroegere zeereizen (English: Adventures and Early Sea Voyages, 1820), narrating Haafner's first journey with his father and his time in South Africa and Jakarta;
- Lotgevallen op eene reize van Madras over Tranquebaar naar het eiland Ceylon (English: Adventures on a Journey from Madras via Tranquebar to Ceylon, 1806), his stay in Negapatnam and Sadras, imprisonment and escape from Madras, and adventures in Ceylon;
- Reize te voet door het eiland Ceilon (English: Travels On Foot Through the Island of Ceylon, 1810), his journey through Sri Lanka in 1783;
- Reize in eenen Palanquin (English: Travels in a Palanquin, 1808, two volumes), his travels along the Coromandel coast and love affair with Mamia;
- Reize naar Bengalen en terugreize naar Europa (English: Journey to Bengal and Return-voyage to Europe, 1822), his stay in West Bengal and return-voyage to Europe.

They were translated into German (1806, 1809, and 1816), French (1811), Swedish (1811), English (1821), and Danish (1821). In a French publisher's note, Haafner was lauded as an "original thinker" with a "brilliant and spirited" writing style; an English reviewer wrote: "There is an air of sprightliness about Mr. Haafner, which certainly belies the place of his nativity."

In addition, Haafner worked on a translation of the Sanskrit epic, Ramayana, which was eventually published in Amsterdam in 1823.

=== Teylers Eerste Genootschap: 1805 essay contest ===
In 1805, Haafner entered the annual essay contest organized by Teylers Eerste Genootschap (English: Teyler's First Society), also known as the Godgeleerd Genootschap (Theological Society), for a cash prize to the question: What has been the use of missionary work in the overseas world in the past and what could possibly be done to improve this work in the future?

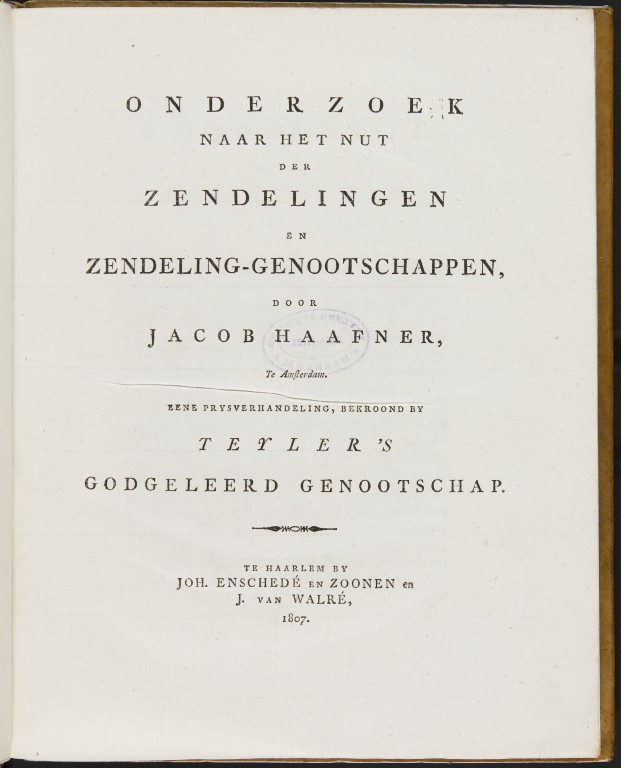
Haafner's published treatise (1807)

In his submission, titled "Onderzoek naar het nut der zendelingen en zendelings-genootschappen" (English: Examination of the usefulness of missionaries and missionary societies), Haafner condemned the behavior of missionaries in the colonies and argued for the complete withdrawal of all imperial powers, citing Voltaire, Rousseau, Bartolomé de las Casas, Bartholomäus Ziegenbalg, Pierre François Xavier de Charlevoix, and Thomas Gage. The essay, eventually published as the contest's winner, prompted heated debates in Dutch missionary circles. Detractors accused Haafner of relying upon inadequate historical knowledge and false conceptions, and of moral corruption.
