= Rinse Koopman =

Dutch educator and minister

Rinse Koopmans (9 March 1770, in Grouw – 5 September 1826, in Koudum) was a Dutch Mennonite teacher and minister.

He was trained at the Amsterdam Mennonite seminary and first served in Blokzijl 1794, Dokkum 1795, and Amsterdam 1796. Koopmans wrote several "Verhandelingen" or lectures, that were published, and his De zoenoffers des Ouden Verbonds en den dood van Christus met derselve vergeleken won a prize from Teylers Eerste Genootschap, which he then joined in 1815 and remained a member till his death in 1826.
