= Peuzelaarsteeg =

Road in Haarlem, Netherlands

Coordinates: 52.3796°N 4.6347°E

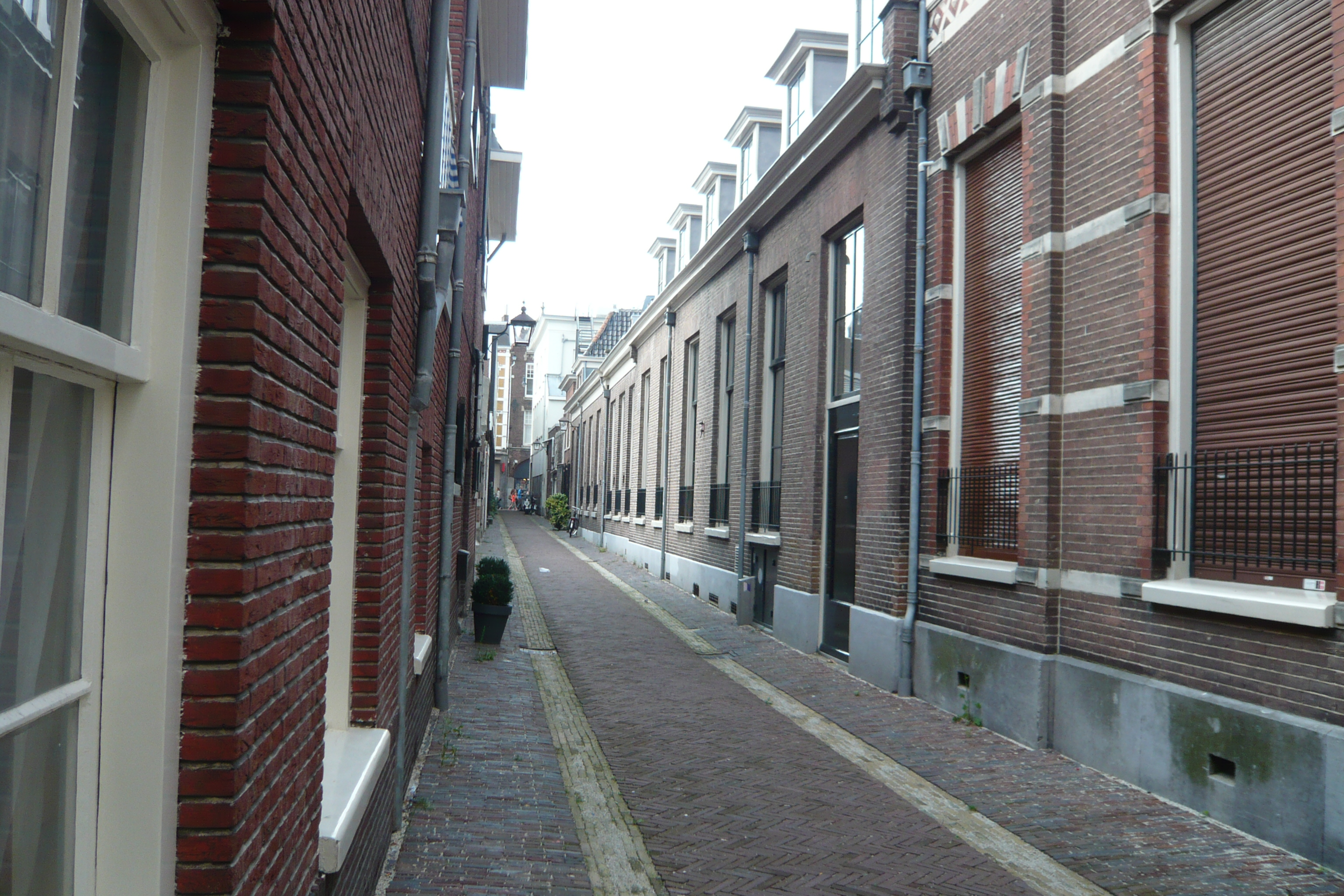
The Peuzelaarsteeg looking westward. On the right is the complex of the Doopsgezinde kerk, Haarlem

The Peuzelaarsteeg is a narrow lane in Haarlem, the Netherlands, that connects the Grote Houtstraat to the Frankestraat.

The lane is famous as the former living quarters of Frans Hals and other Haarlem artists, though it was changed unrecognizably when the Mennonite church was built there in the 17th century.
