= Adriaan Loosjes =

Dutch botanist, poet, novelist and publisher

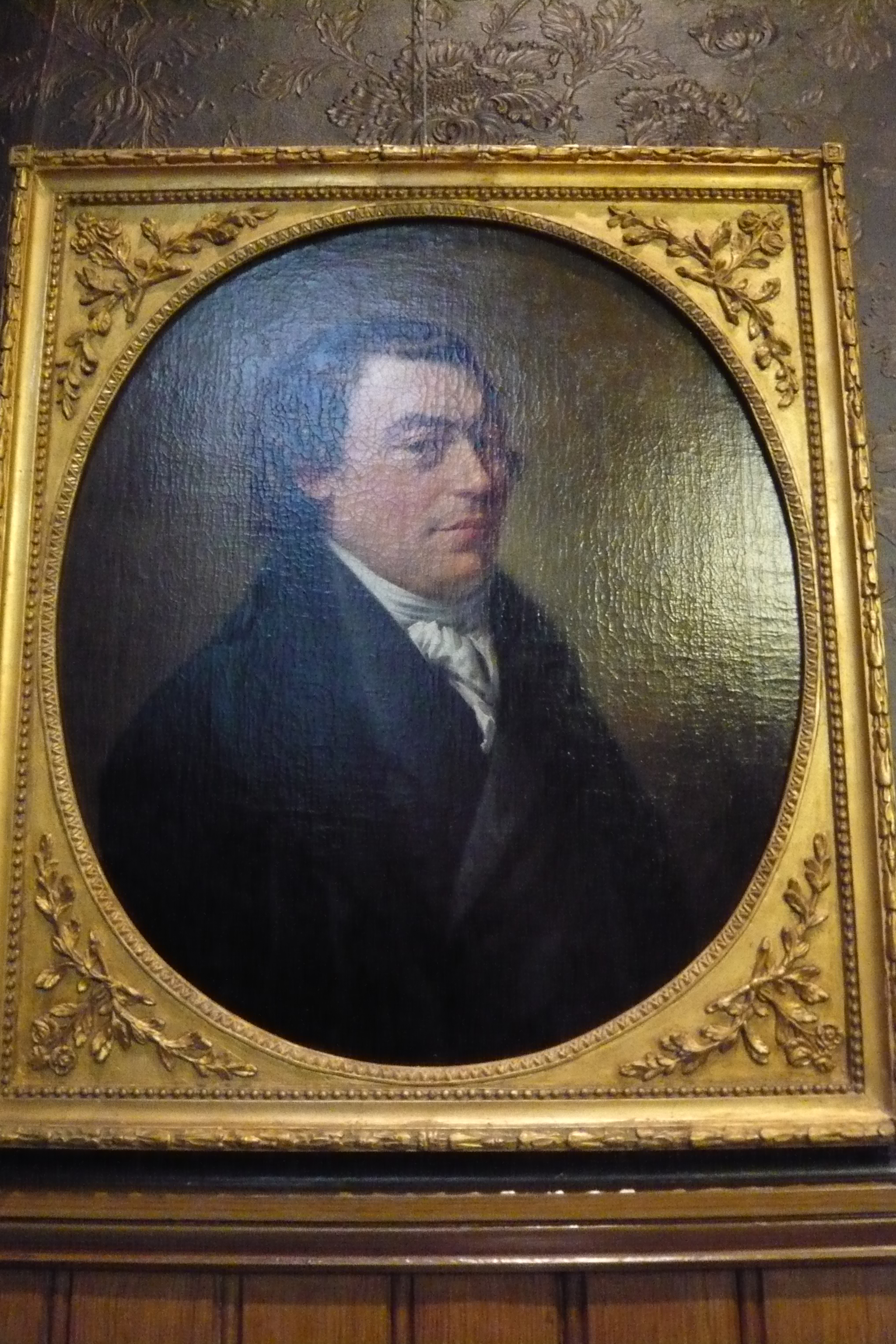
Portrait of Adriaan Loosjes in the Doopsgezinde kerk, Haarlem, by Wybrand Hendriks, 1796

Adriaan Loosjes (1761, in Texel – 1818, in Haarlem), was a 19th-century botanist, poet, novelist and publisher born in Den Hoorn, North Holland, Netherlands.

== Biography ==
He came from a family of Mennonite ministers and was an active member of Doopsgezinde Church, Haarlem, where he started his first literary society in 1777, Honos alit artes. In 1779 he started another one called Vlijt moeder der Wetenschappen that began to annually announce contests with a prize similar to the Teylers Eerste Genootschap that was founded the year before. In 1782 these two societies were merged and also began to produce plays, which Loosjes wrote, acted in, and published himself, becoming a Haarlem bookseller. In the same year Jan van Walré joined to become an actor. Under his influence, in 1785 the society was reinvented as the theater society Leerzaam vermaak with a strong Patriotic bias with Loosjes and Walré the leaders. When the House of Orange briefly enjoyed a contrarevolution, Leerzaam vermaak was banned, and Loosjes decided to avoid politics and relinquished his official roles in the group, spending his time on scientific and writing pursuits. In 1789 he started the Haarlem scientific society Maatschappij tot Nut van 't Algemeen. To continue with his comedies, he began the society Democriet in the same year with the remark Because Heraclitus had to cry, Democritus had to laugh. In 1790 Walré joined Democriet, who again added political color, despite Loosjes' intentions to remain neutral. In 1795 when the French occupation began, the activities of Democriet reached their peak, and after that moment the society began to show similarities with freemasonry.

Loosjes wrote several books and plays, and translated historical works from English into Dutch. He succeeded his father Petrus Loosjes as a member of Teylers Eerste Genootschap from 1813 until his own death in 1818. His son Vincent Loosjes continued his publishing business.

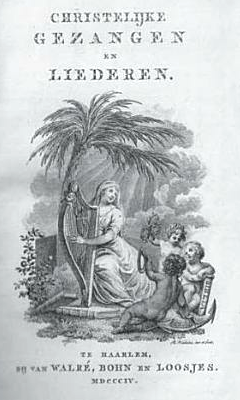
Songbook published in 1804 with 74 lyrics by Aagje Deken and preface signed by father and son Loosjes
