= Doopsgezinde kerk, Haarlem =

Mennonite church in the Netherlands

Coordinates: 52°22′48″N 4°38′5.8″E

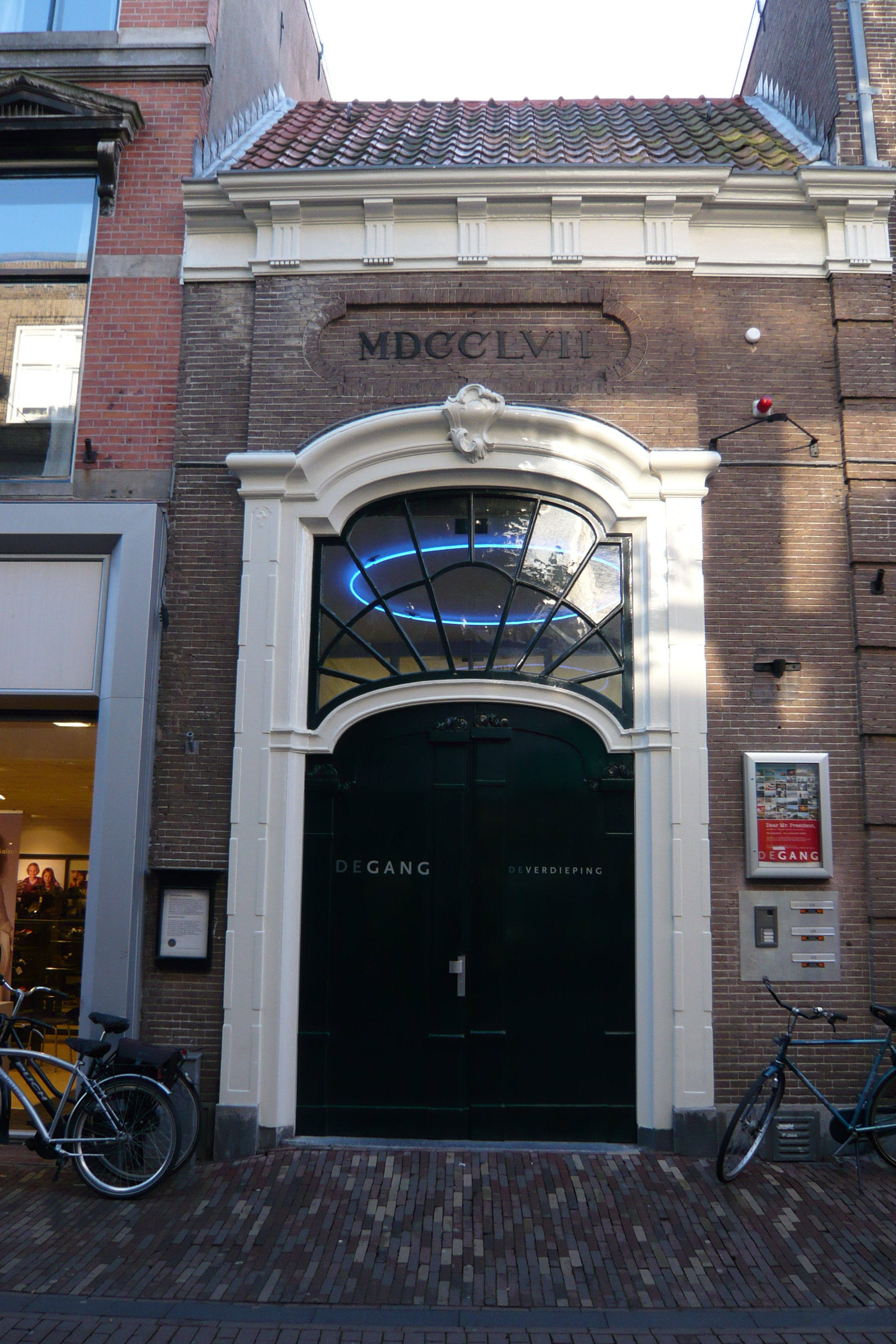
Entrance built in 1757 to the Doopsgezinde kerk on the Grote Houtstraat in Haarlem.

The Doopsgezinde kerk is a historical hidden Mennonite church dating from 1683 between the Grote Houtstraat, Peuzelaarsteeg and the Frankestraat in Haarlem, Netherlands.

== Building ==
The church (mostly referred to as 'Grote Vermaning' or 'Vermaning') was built in 1683 in Hollandic Classicist style. The church has three entrances on each side. Originally the church could only be entered via a small alleyway. The building was hidden between houses. The church does not have a tower. In 1757 the church built a big hallway to the Grote Houtstraat. Nowadays that hallway is used as exhibition space, called 'De Gang' (The hallway).

== Interior ==
The interior of the complex is simple and sober, as usual at Mennonite churches.

The current pulpit was built in 1891. The original pulpit was higher, but then preacher Jernonimo de Vries was afraid of heights; at his request the pulpit was replaced with the current lower one. The pews were meant for male members of church, the women and children were seated on chairs in the middle.

The current organ was built by organ builders Ahrend and Brunzema en placed in 1968. It was inaugurated by an organ concert by Wim Dalm. The electric chandelier was designed by architect A.W. Weismann in 1912. Above the galleries hang small versions of the chandelier. In the same year the stained glass windows were placed.

The regents room from 1902 was built in Jugendstil, designed by J.A.G. van der Steur. The room is used by the church council.

The deaconesses room (or 'dameskamer') also from 1902, was built in Jugendstil en Amsterdamse school. The deaconesses room is originally meant for the college of deaconesses, which exists since 1748 out of six woman and from 1810 out of five woman. The deaconesses were responsible for charity duties, e.g. cleaning the church and helping the almshouse. Deaconesses was an official position at the Mennonite church, which was not normal in that time. In 1962 the college of deacons, was cancelled, but the college of deaconesses stayed. Nowadays the deaconesses focus on elderly care, organizing activities and visiting the elderly.

The library has a safe, with a hallway that connects to the former room of Jacobus van Zanten.

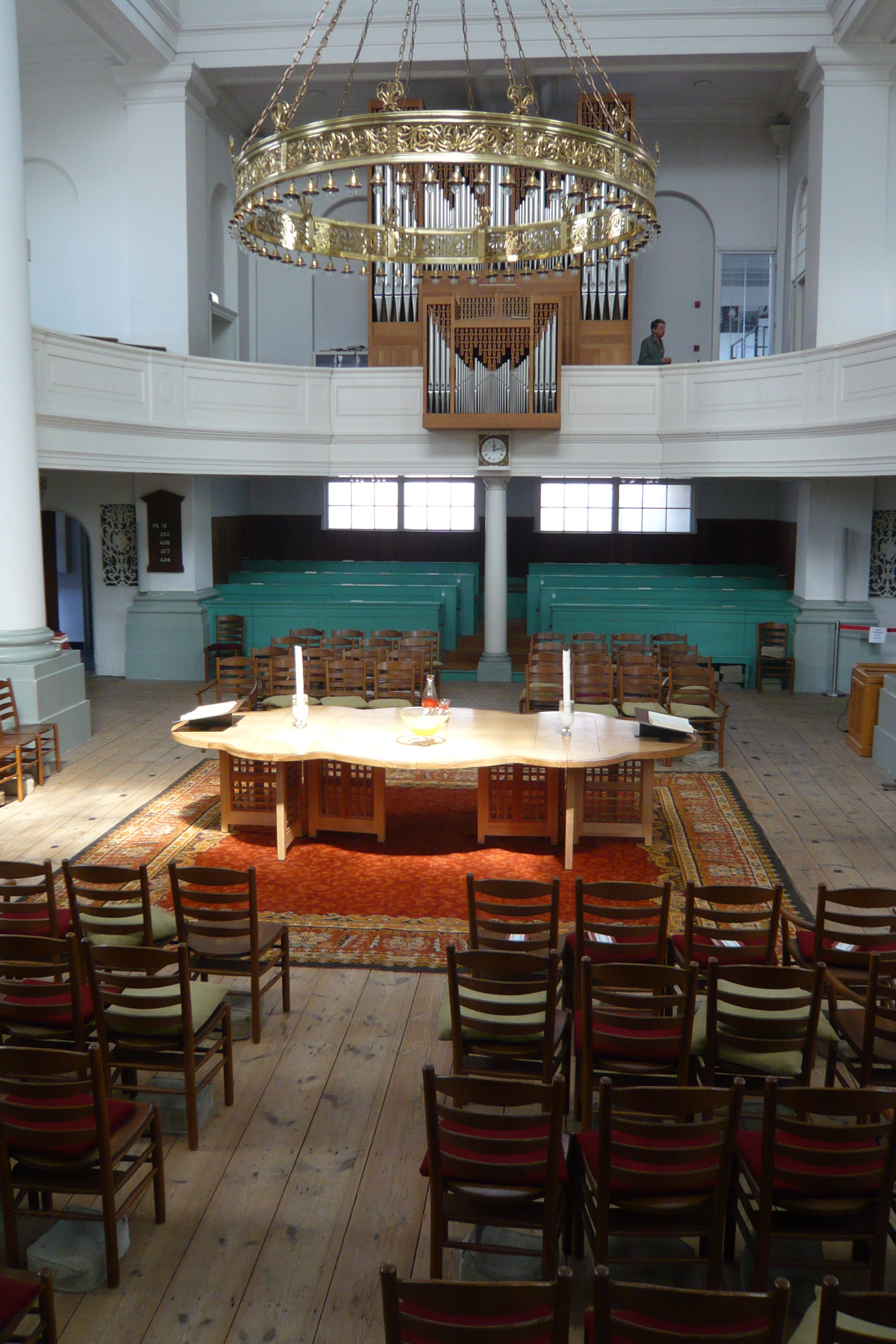
View from the pulpit

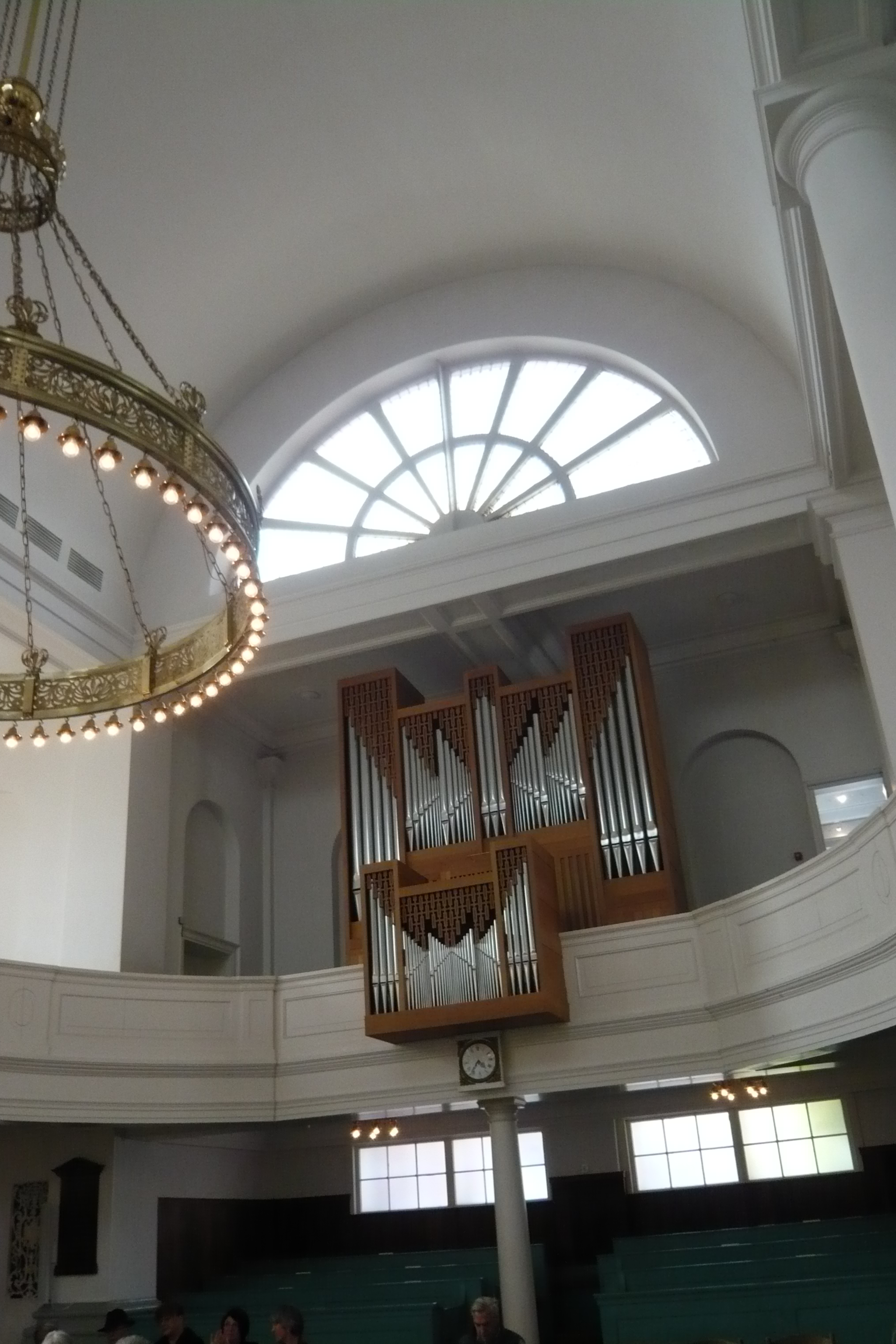
Interior with organ.

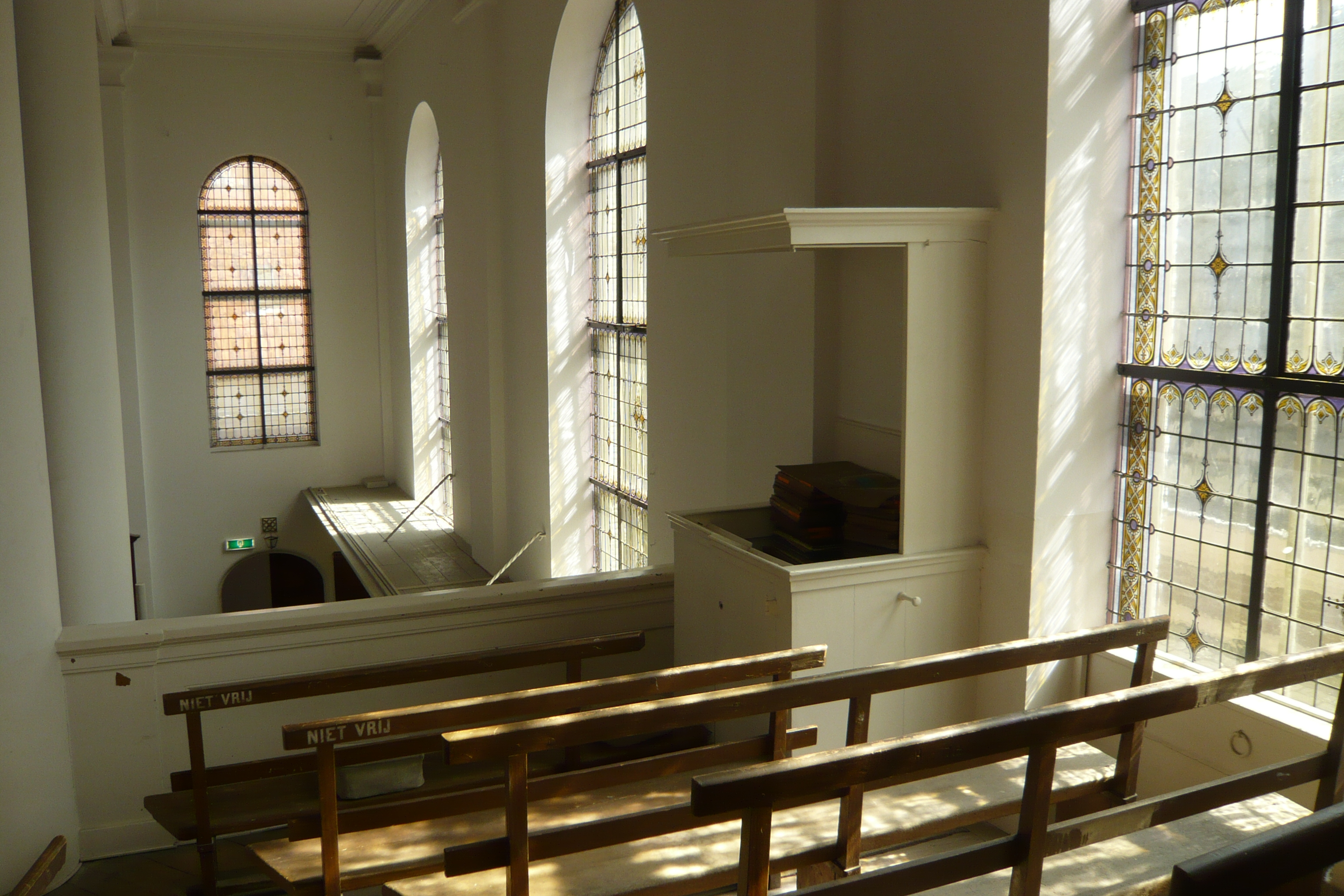
Gallery for the orphans with watchhouse for the orphan governess

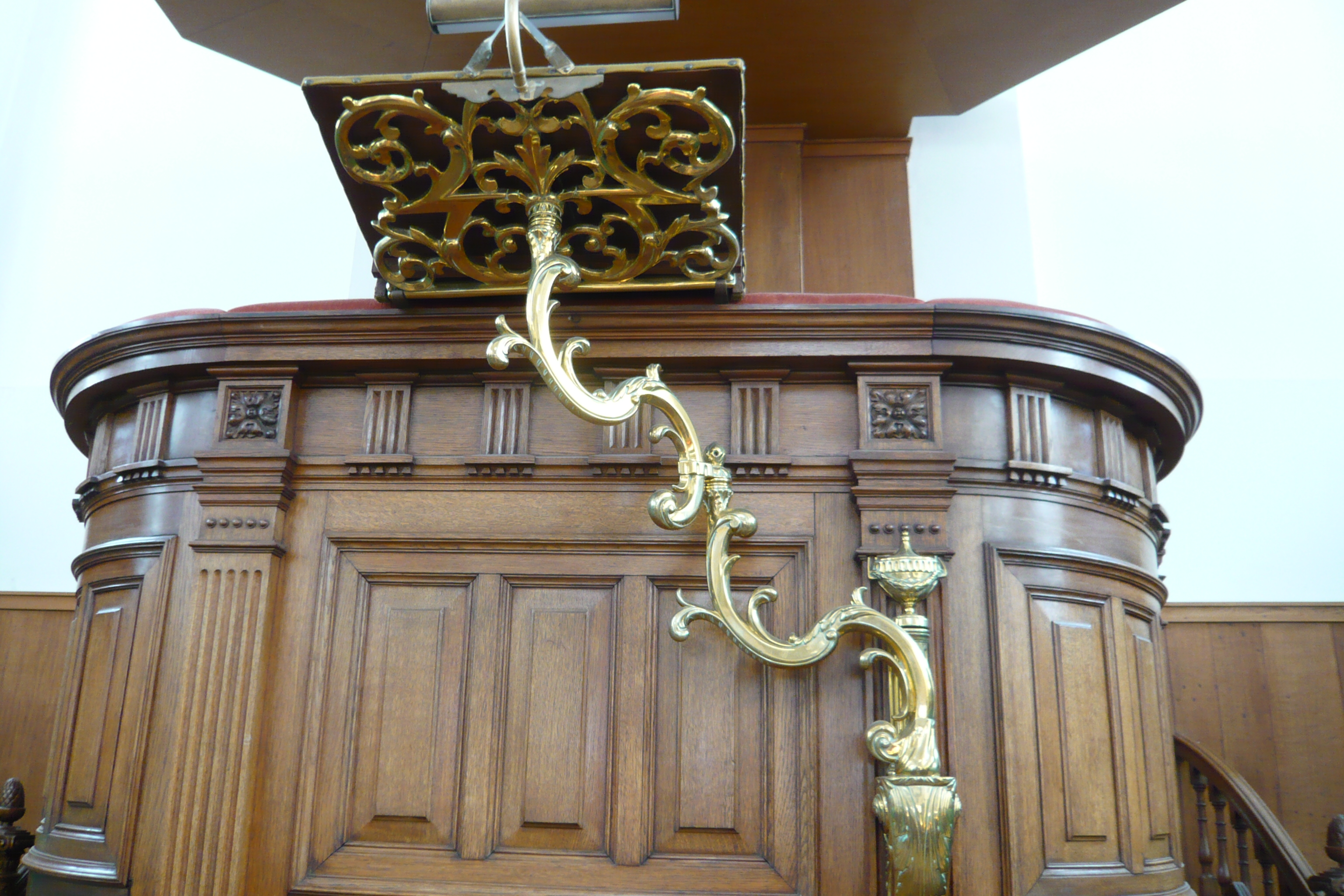
Pulpit with baroque brass sermon holder

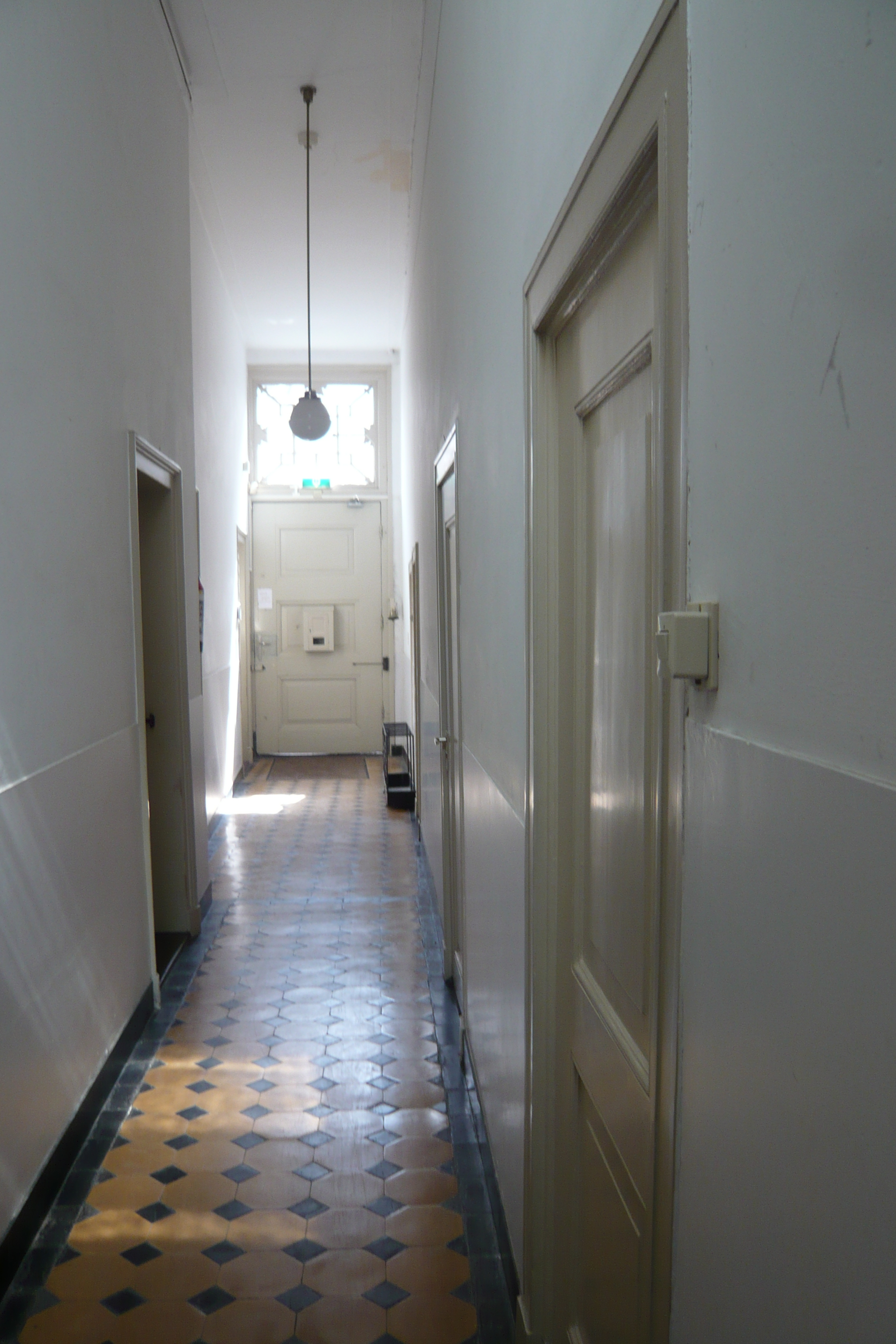
Former alley joined the former courtyard to the former entrance on the Peuzelaarsteeg

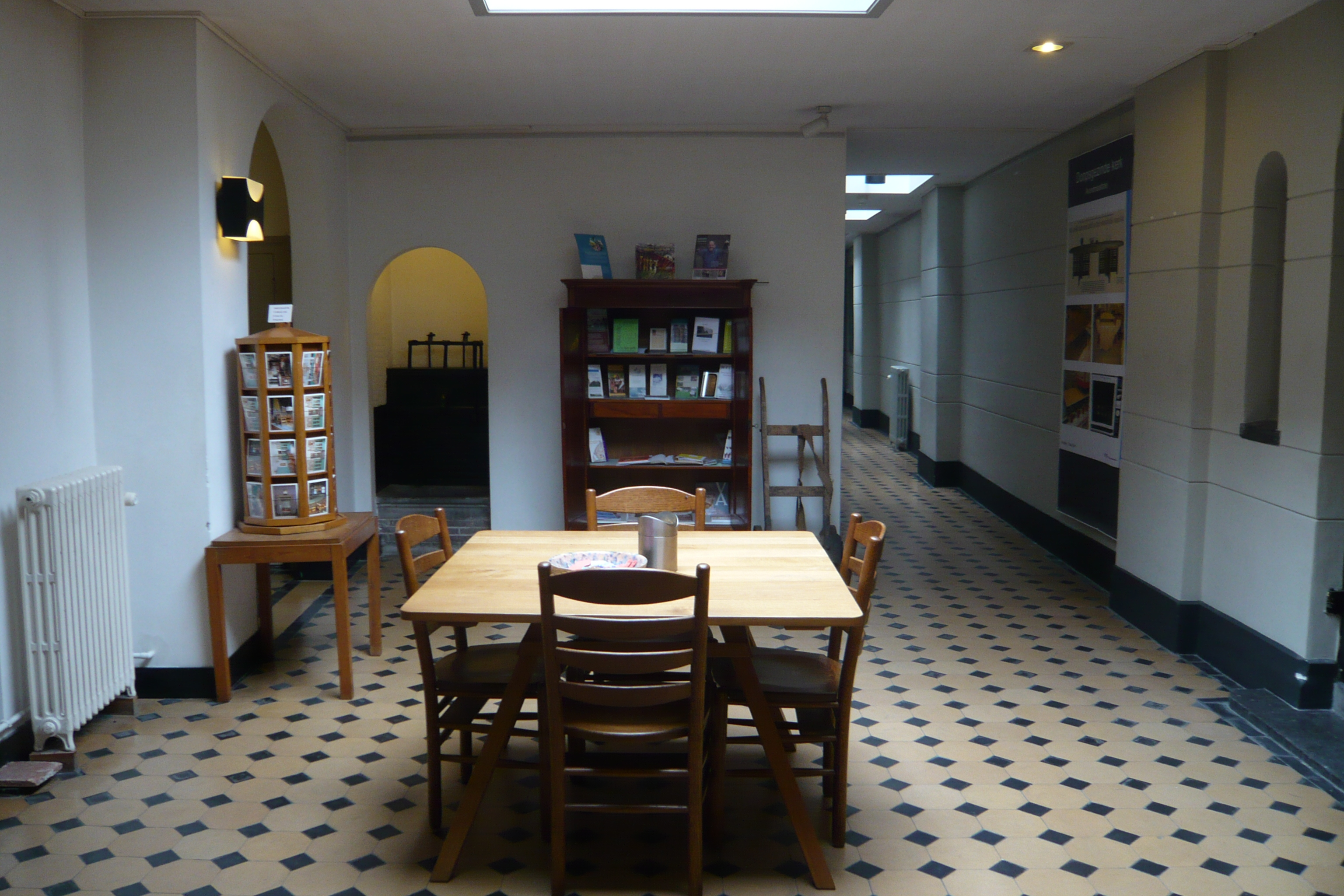
Former courtyard converted to hallway

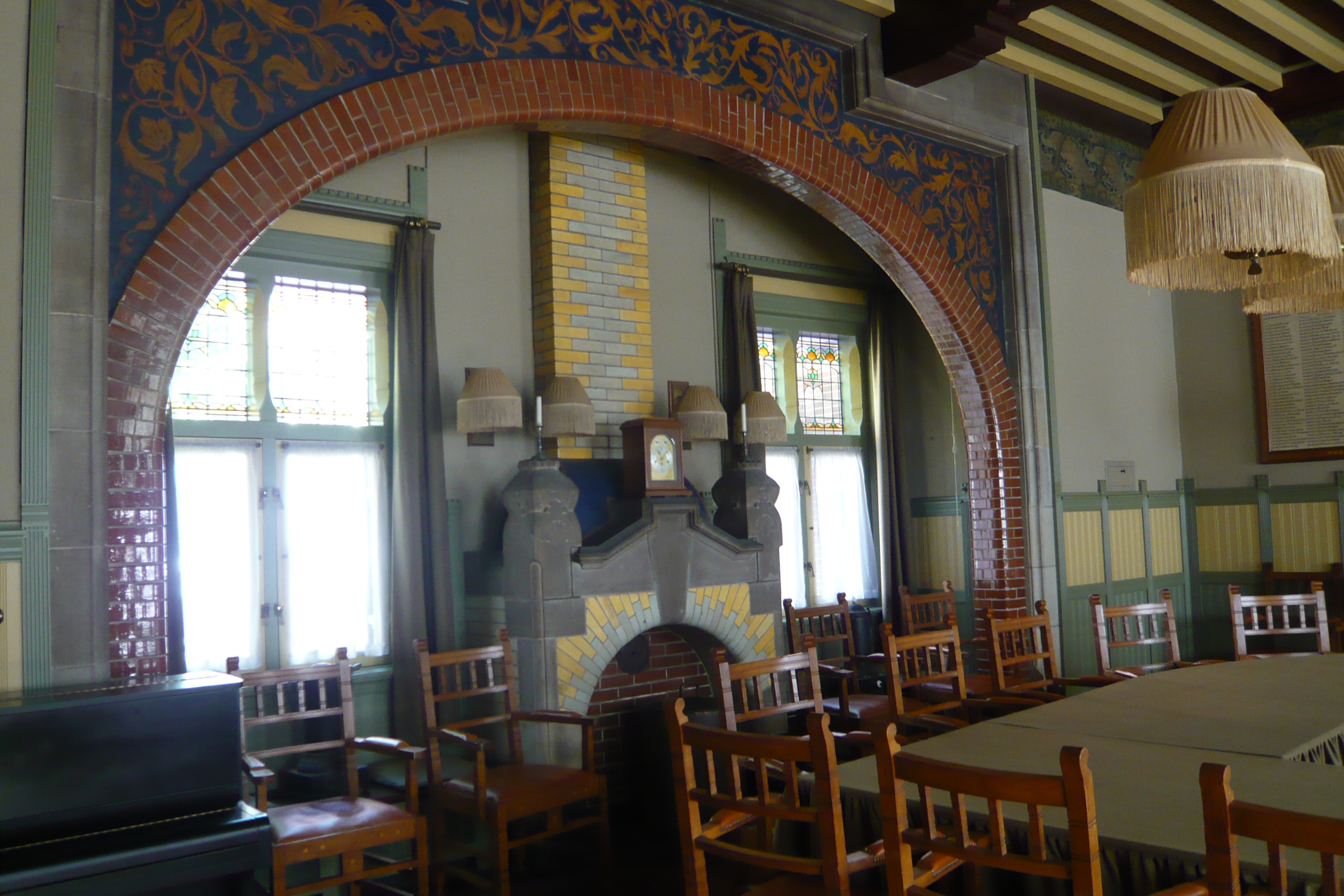
Regents room from 1902

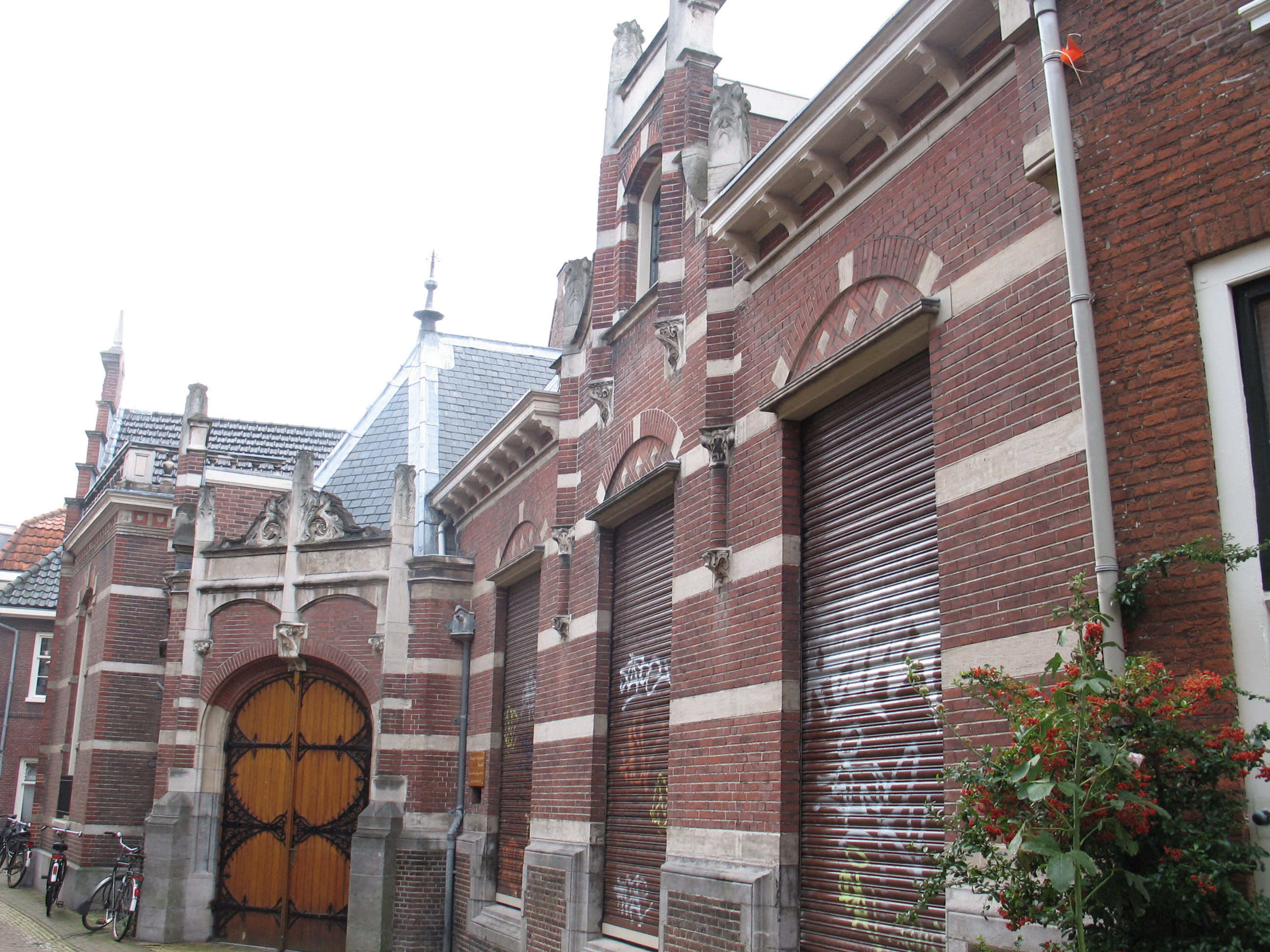
Entrance at the Frankestraat 24

== Nowadays ==
The church is still being used by the Mennonites, services take place on an alternating schedule, with one week in the 'Grote Vermaning' in Haarlem and the following week in the 'Kleine Vermaning' in Heemstede. Associated with the church is a youth house (Sneel), which serves as a meeting place for young people on a weekly basis. Next to the entrance on the 'Grote Houtstraat' (Street) is a small shop and café located, a project from the church and the 'Hartekampgroep' where people with intellectual disabilities work. The shop is called 'Jansje'. At that same entrance of the church is a big hallway to the church, built by Pieter Teyler van der Hulst, for his carriage. Nowadays the hallway is being used as photo exhibition. The church is daily opened to public when people are at work in the church, or on open monuments day. Two days a month there is a theatrical guided tour, in Dutch.
