= Teylers Eerste Genootschap =

Dutch organisation to promote and award prizes for research

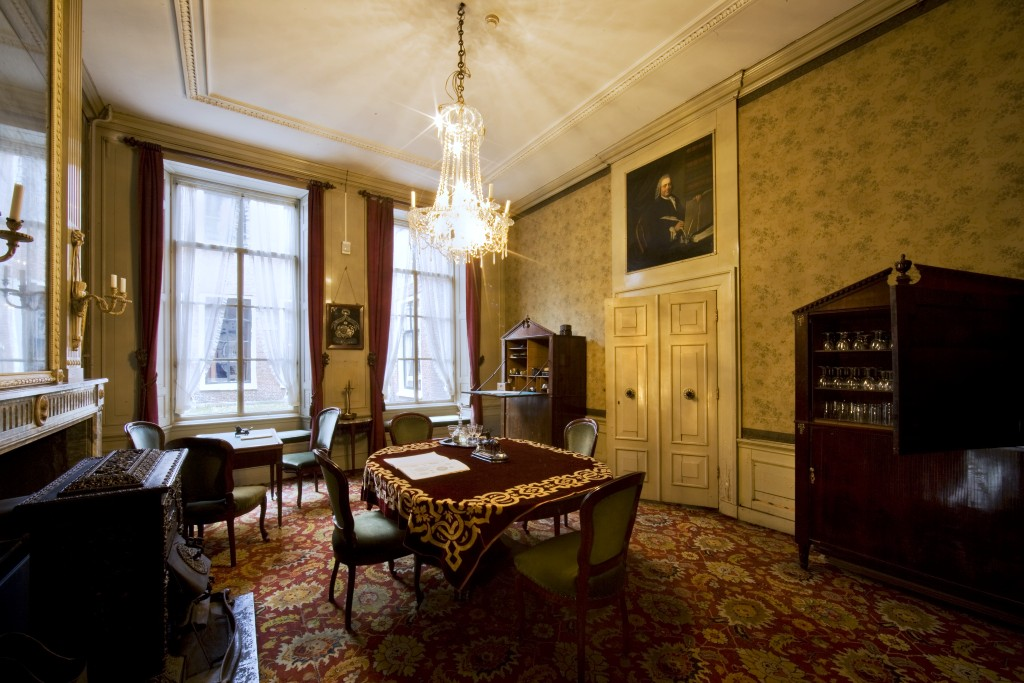
Kleine Herenkamer (Smaller Boardroom) in Foundation House, where the society meets annually

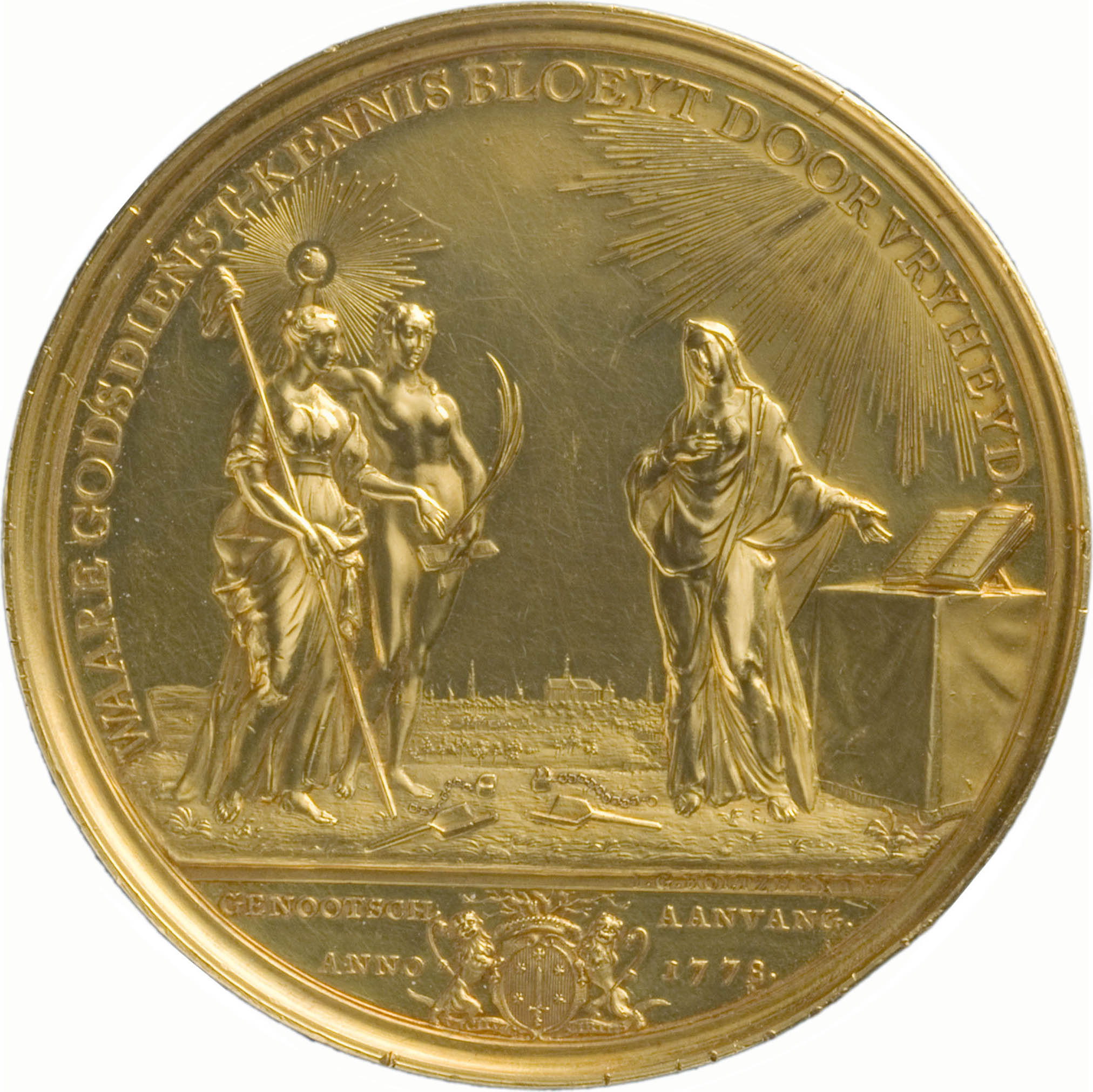
Prize medal awarded in 1784 by Teylers First Society to William Laurence Brown. The design was made in 1778 by Johann Georg Holtzhey, who stamped the medals for all winners. After his death, the press was bought by the Stichting and Teylers still stamps the prize medals in the same way.

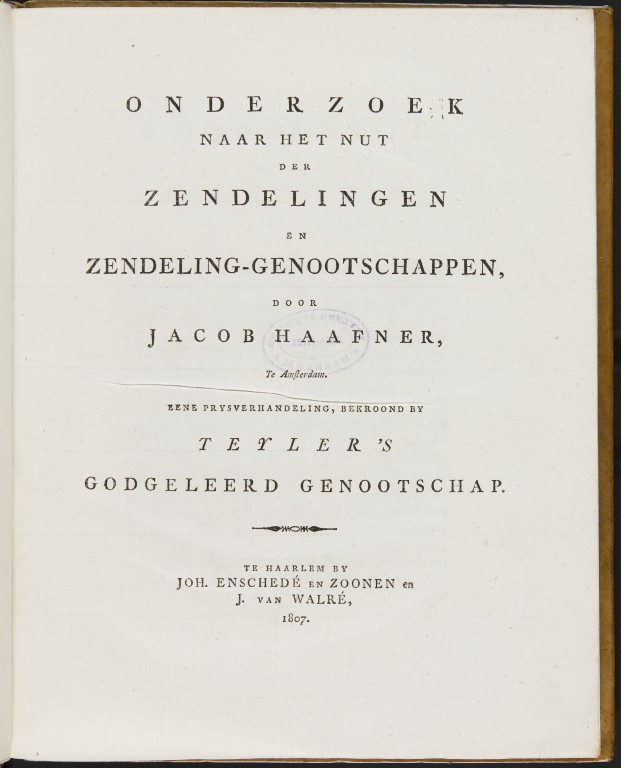
Title page of Haafner's award-winning submission on Christian mission, in Verhandelingen van Teylers Godgeleerd Genootschap (Proceedings of Teylers Theological society) XXII, Haarlem, 1807.

Teylers Eerste Genootschap (English: Teyler's First Society), also known as the Godgeleerd Genootschap (Theological Society) is one of the two societies founded within the Teylers Stichting as a result of the will of the Dutch 18th-century merchant Pieter Teyler van der Hulst. The First Society is focused on theology, while the Second Society is focused on art and science.

== History ==
The society was founded in 1778, and the first five members were appointed through Teylers testament: two remonstrant preachers and three mennonite preachers. As stipulated, there had to be six members, and the sixth member was selected by the first five, and was the mennonite Frederik Scheltinga. The society had also a sister society, Teylers Tweede Genootschap - which focused on art and science but is organized in a similar way.

The main activity of the society is to discuss theological issues, and annually announce contests with a relative high prize compared to similar contests by other societies (400 guilders for the 1778 edition). The prizes were awarded by the members of the society and the directors of the foundation jointly.

== 1805 competition: Jacob Haafner ==
Because of the different religious backgrounds of the directors compared to the society members, conflicts over the outcome were not unheard of. This became especially visible in 1805, when Jacob Haafner submitted an essay on the question "What did the mission bring us so far, and what can be expected" which answered it in a negative sense - much more liberal than the directors would allow, while the jury members were deeply impressed. It took them two years to work out the differences, and the piece would only be published in 1807.

== Essay competitions: procedure ==
Especially in the early years, when the questions were less conservatively focused, the amount of replies was high because of the high prize associated with winning it. Until 1796 the answers had to be submitted in Latin, Dutch or French, after 1796 also English and German were allowed. The name of the submitting author was only available in a sealed envelope, which was linked to the piece and would only be opened in case the piece would win the contest. All other envelopes were burned unopened - and their replies archived anonymously. The winner receives a silver or gold medal or a sum of money and its submission was published in the Verhandelingen van Teylers Eerste Genootschap (Proceedings of Teylers First Society).

The most recent contest is from 2011, asking for "research on the formation and/or change of the Dutch perception of Islam in the years 1990-2010" which will run through 2014. A contest typically runs for three years at a time - hence multiple contest can be active at any given moment.

The society meets annually in the Kleine Herenkamer (Small Boardroom) in the Teylers Fundatiehuis (Teylers Foundation House) next to the Teylers Museum.

== Current members ==
The members of the society are nowadays well known academics in the field of Christianity working at various universities throughout the Netherlands - (assistant) professors in different relevant fields such as "history of Christianity" and "the New Testament".

- Alle Hoekema (assistant professor Vrije Universiteit Amsterdam)
- Maarten Menken (professor University of Tilburg)
- Ed Noort (honorary professor Rijksuniversiteit Groningen)
- Ernestine van der Wall (professor Leiden University)
- Herman Beck (professor University of Tilburg)
- Victor Kal (assistant professor University of Amsterdam)

== See also ==
- Teylers Stichting
- Teylers Tweede Genootschap (English: Teylers Second Society)
- List of members of Teylers Eerste Genootschap

== External sources ==
- Museum website on Teylers First Society
- Museum website on the 18th century practice of essay competitions
