= De Marne =

- Municipality
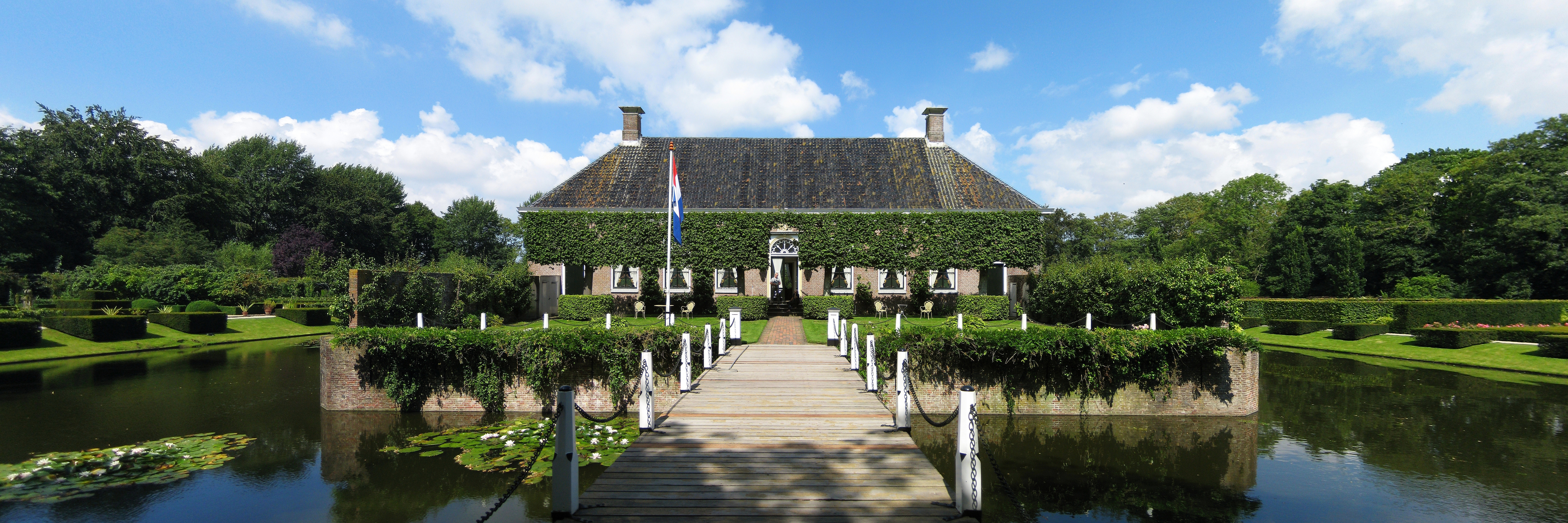
- Verhildersum castle in Leens

- Flag Coat of arms

- Location in Groningen
- Coordinates: 53°22′N 6°23′E
- Country: Netherlands
- Province: Groningen
- Established: 1 January 1990

Area
  - Total: 240.33 km^{2} (92.79 sq mi)
  - Land: 168.21 km^{2} (64.95 sq mi)
  - Water: 72.12 km^{2} (27.85 sq mi)
- Elevation: 1 m (3.3 ft)

Population (January 2021)
  - Total: data missing
- Time zone: UTC+1 (CET)
  - Summer (DST): UTC+2 (CEST)
- Postcode: 9960–9978
- Area code: 0519, 0595
- Website: www.demarne.nl

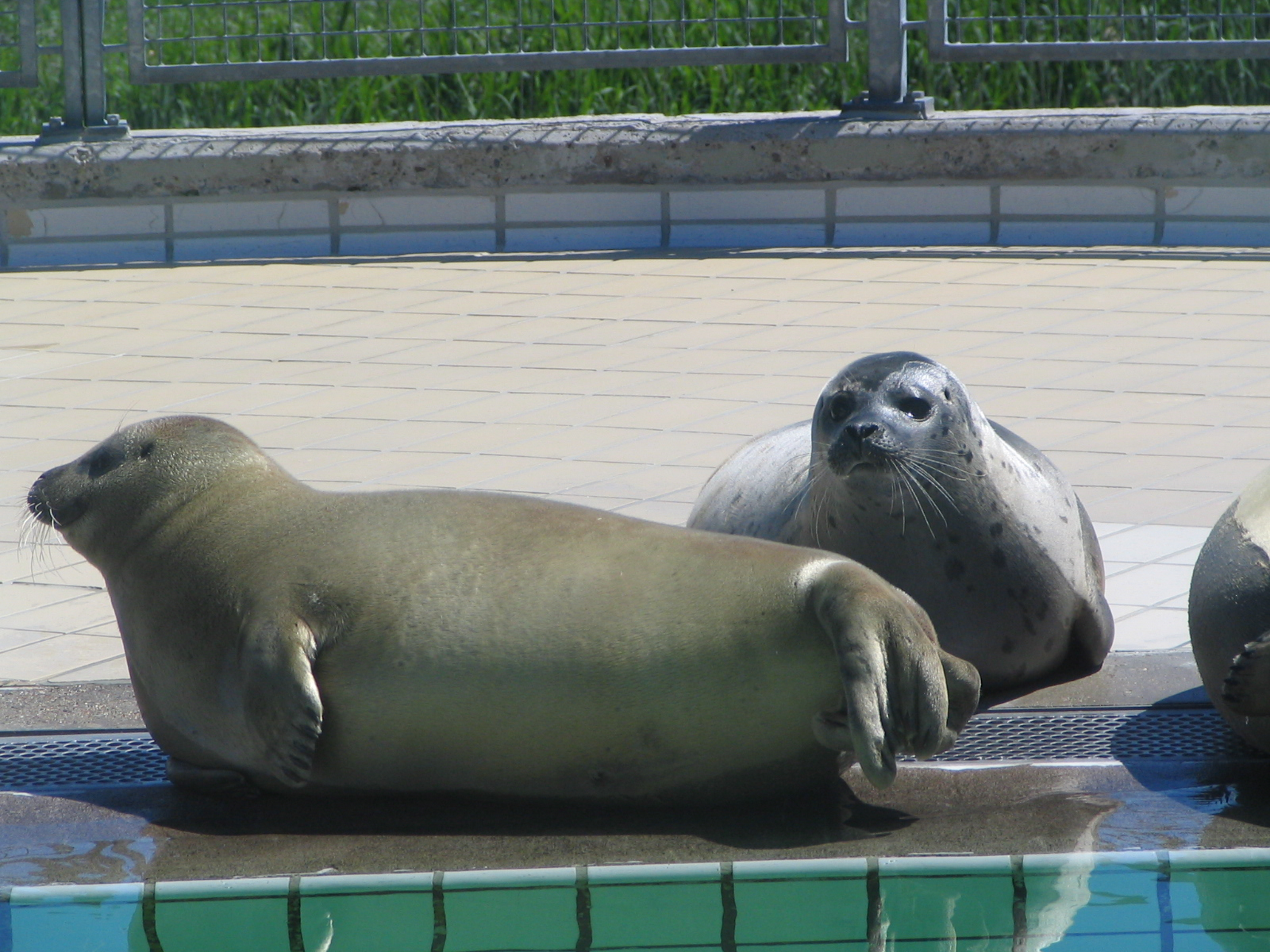
Pinnipeds in the crèche in Pieterburen

De Marne (Dutch pronunciation: [də ˈmɑrnə]) is a former municipality in the northeast of the Netherlands. On 1 January 2019 it merged with the municipalities of Bedum, Eemsmond and Winsum to form the new municipality Het Hogeland.

== Population centres ==
Broek, Eenrum, Hornhuizen, Houwerzijl, Kleine Huisjes, Kloosterburen, Kruisweg, Lauwersoog, Leens, Mensingeweer, Molenrij, Niekerk, Pieterburen, Schouwerzijl, Ulrum, Vierhuizen, Warfhuizen, Wehe-den Hoorn, Westernieland, Zoutkamp, Zuurdijk.

=== Topography ===
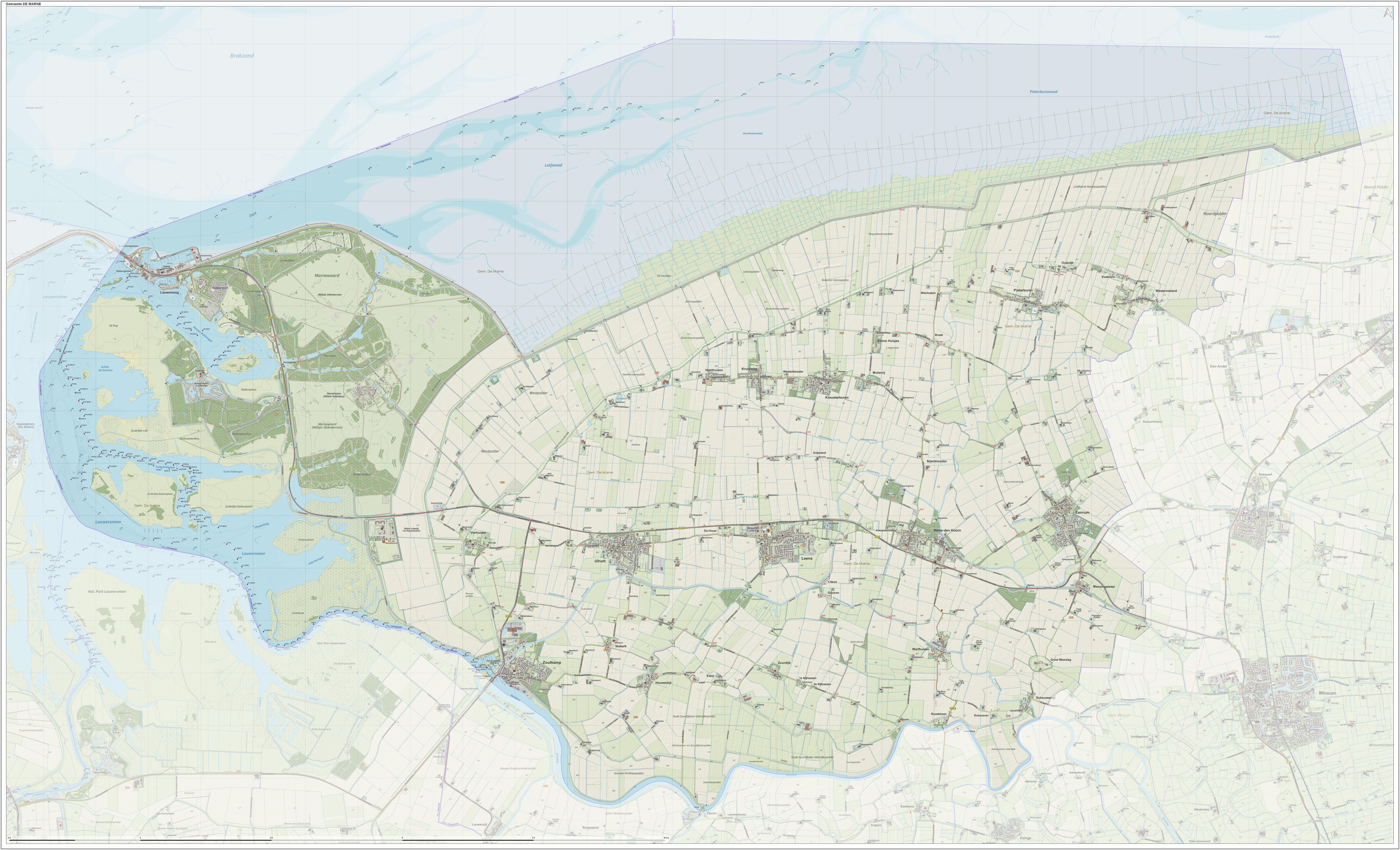

Dutch Topographic map of De Marne, June 2015

== A brief description ==
The municipality of De Marne lies in the north-western part of the province of Groningen, adjoining the Wadden Sea. It has about 10,000 inhabitants, covers an area of 240 square kilometres and encompasses 21 villages.

De Marne is mainly an agricultural area, focussing on crop growing and cattle farming. The fishing industry also plays an important role. Bulb cultivation is also an up-and-coming commercial endeavour.

=== Maren ===
De Marne has a large network of footpaths, cyclepaths, and sailing/canoeing routes. Of particular interest are the so-called 'maren': narrow waterways twisting and turning their way throughout the countryside. They are particularly suitable for recreational sailing and canoeing. The many marked walks, cycle routes and sail and drive routes connect all of the various villages.

=== Special attractions ===
Besides the well-known attractions such as the seal crèche in Pieterburen, the centre for mud flat walking and the Lauwersmeer area, there are also some other attractions. For instance, there is the Borg Verhildersum in Leens, Abraham's Mustard Museum in Eenrum and many churches, towers, listed heritage farms, terps and protected village settings. There are also famous church organs built by Arp Schnitger, Lohman (family) and Hinsz.

=== Pilgrimage ===
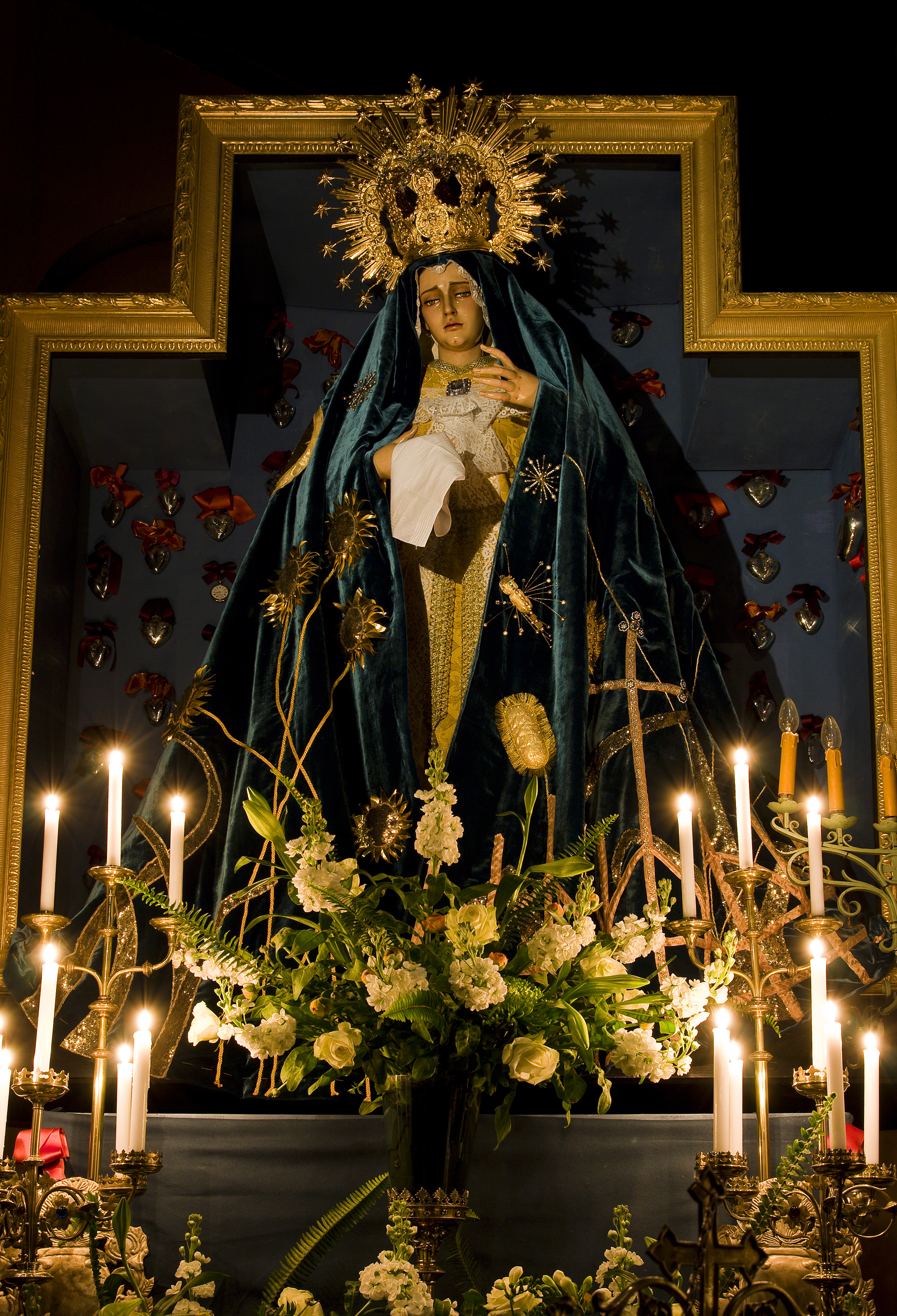
Statue of the Sorrowful Mother of Warfhuizen

The hermitage of Our Lady of the Enclosed Garden in Warfhuizen is a popular Marian shrine. Processions go from Wehe-den Hoorn to Warfhuizen four or five times a year. A unique devotional practice is the 'swapping of the handkerchief'. According to Spanish tradition the statue of the crying Virgin usually holds a white handkerchief. The faithful bring a new white handkerchief and give it to the hermit to swap it with the one the Virgin has been holding which, in turn, is then given to someone sick or lonely. Students take it to their exams to calm their nerves.

=== The Lauwersmeer area ===
The Lauwersmeer area is a nature area suitable for fishing, bird watching, walking, and cycling. It features a few waters ports. The area covers about 90 square kilometres. The Lauwersmeer area came into existence when the Lauwerszee was closed off in 1969. Over the years the salt has slowly retreated from the water and new countryside has emerged.

=== Local products ===
There are a number of typical products of the area. An example of this is the 'Spelt Project'. This project ensures the production of pure local products. Farmers, millers, bakers, upholsterers and distillers work together to produce old-fashioned spelt grain, flour, bread, gin and cushions filled with spelt husks.

=== Municipal reorganisation ===
The municipality came into being in 1990 when the smaller municipalities of Eenrum, Kloosterburen, Leens and Ulrum were joined together. The local government employs about 115 people.

== Notable people ==
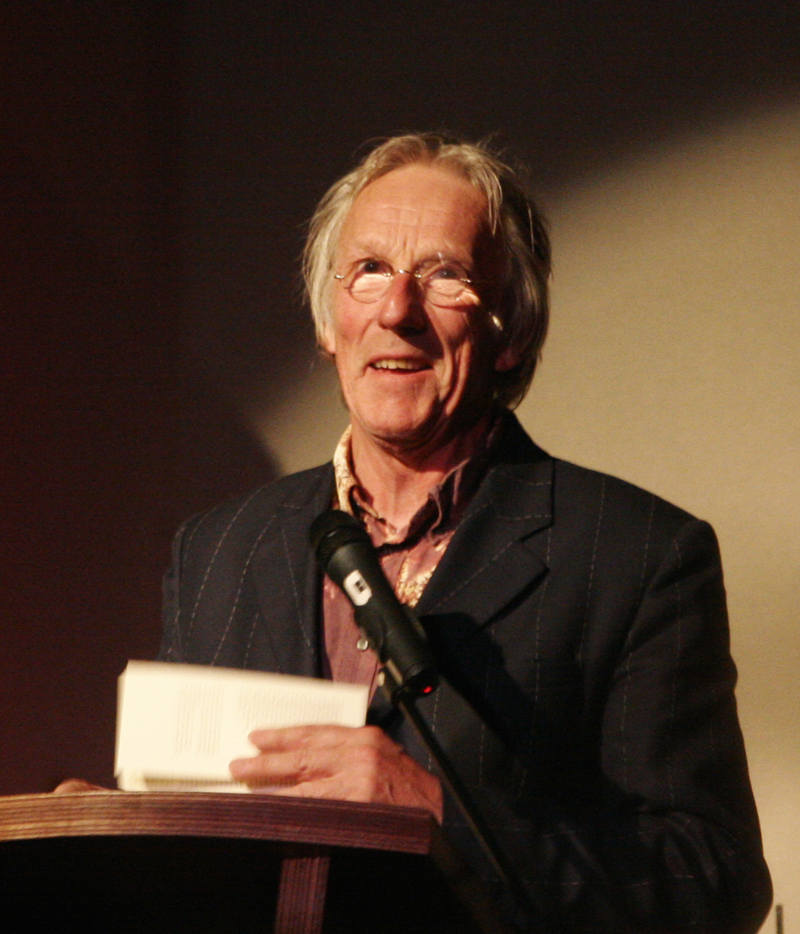
Freek de Jonge, 2010

- Hendrik Nicolaas Werkman (1882 in Leens – 1945) an experimental Dutch artist, typographer and printer
- Cornelis Simon Meijer (1904 in Pieterburen – 1974) a Dutch mathematician and academic
- Sicco Mansholt (1908 in Ulrum – 1995) a Dutch politician and diplomat
- Martin Zijlstra (1944 in Eenrum – 2014) a Dutch politician
- Freek de Jonge (born 1944 in Westernieland) a Dutch cabaret performer and writer
