= Wehe-den Hoorn =

- Village
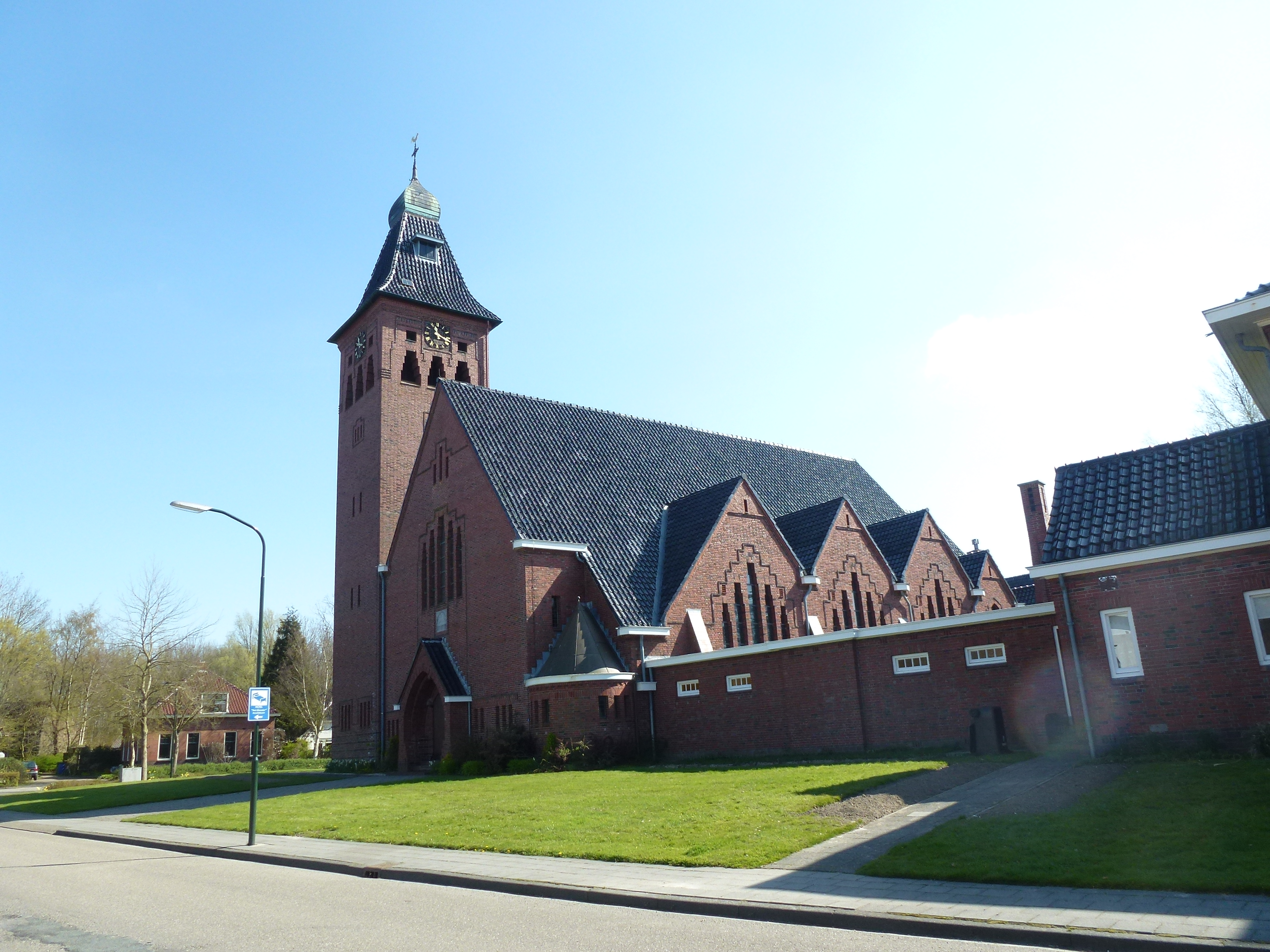
- Saint Boniface Church

- Flag

- Location in province of Groningen in the Netherlands Wehe-den Hoorn (Netherlands)
- Coordinates: 53.3597°N 6.4181°E
- Country: Netherlands
- Province: Groningen
- Municipality: Het Hogeland

Area
  - Total: 0.73 km^{2} (0.28 sq mi)
- Elevation: 1 m (3.3 ft)

Population (2021)
  - Total: 705
  - Density: 970/km^{2} (2,500/sq mi)
- Time zone: UTC+1 (CET)
  - Summer (DST): UTC+2 (CEST)
- Postal code: 9964
- Dialing code: 0595

Wehe-Den Hoorn (Gronings: t Hörn-Wij) is a village in the Dutch province of Groningen. It is part of the municipality of Het Hogeland. It is a 1966 merger of the villages of Wehe and Den Hoorn.

== History ==
Wehe was a terp (artificial mount) village on the road from Ulrum to Winsum. It was first mentioned in the 10th or 11th century as UUie and means temple (similar to Wye in Kent). Den Hoorn was a nearby hamlet. A portion of the population remained Roman Catholic. Each year, several processions start in Wehe-den Hoorn to the Sorrowful Mother of Warfhuizen. The Dutch Reformed Church dates from 1553. The Catholic Saint Boniface Church, designed by Joseph Cuypers and his son Pierre Cuypers and completed in 1927, houses a Mary statue from the 16th century.

In 1679, the estate Borgweer was built near Wehe. Later it became the property of the Tjarda van Starkenborgh family who renamed it Starkenborgh. It was torn down in 1832, and only a path remained which used to be a long driveway to the estate.

In 1795, Wehe was home to 327 people. It became part of the municipality of Leens, however the town hall was in Wehe. The villages of Wehe and Den Hoorn had merged into a single entity. In 1966, the villages were officially merged and named Wehe-den Hoorn. In 2019, it became part municipality of Het Hogeland.

== Notable people ==
- Louwe Huizenga (1893–1973), long-distance runner who set the marathon record in 1915

== Gallery ==
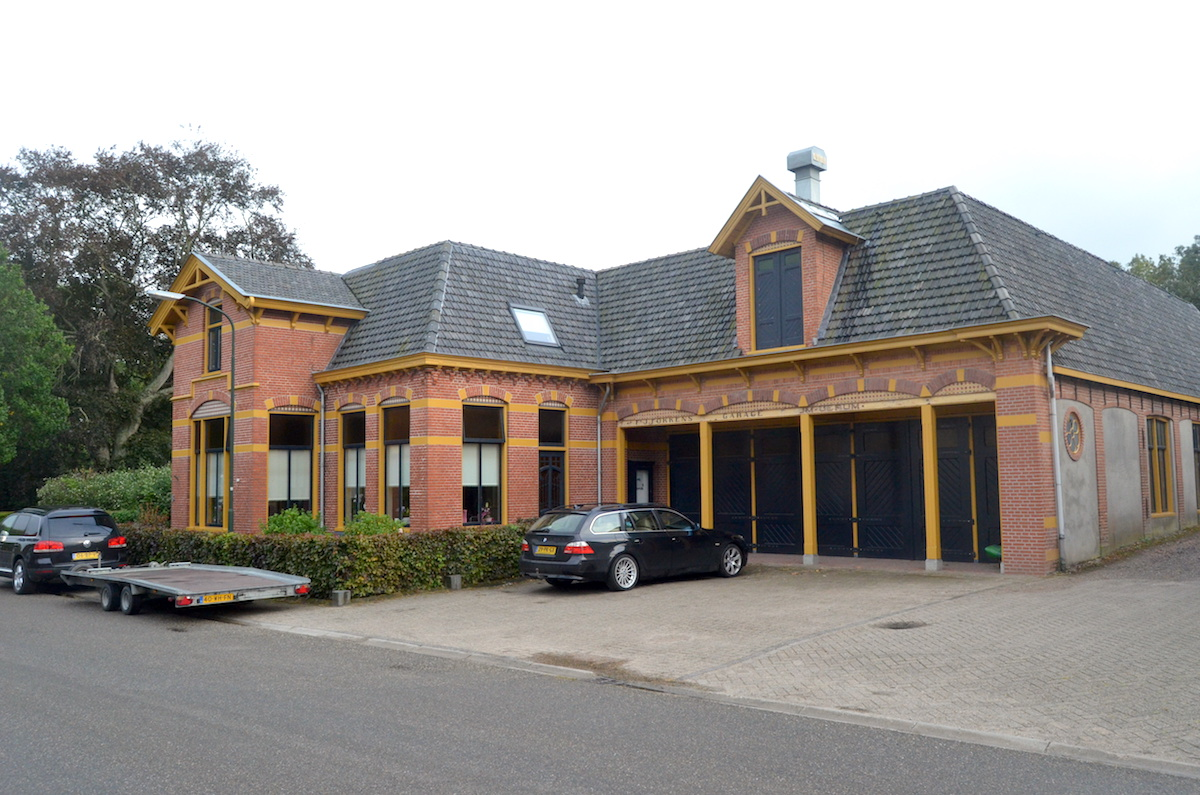
Former tram station

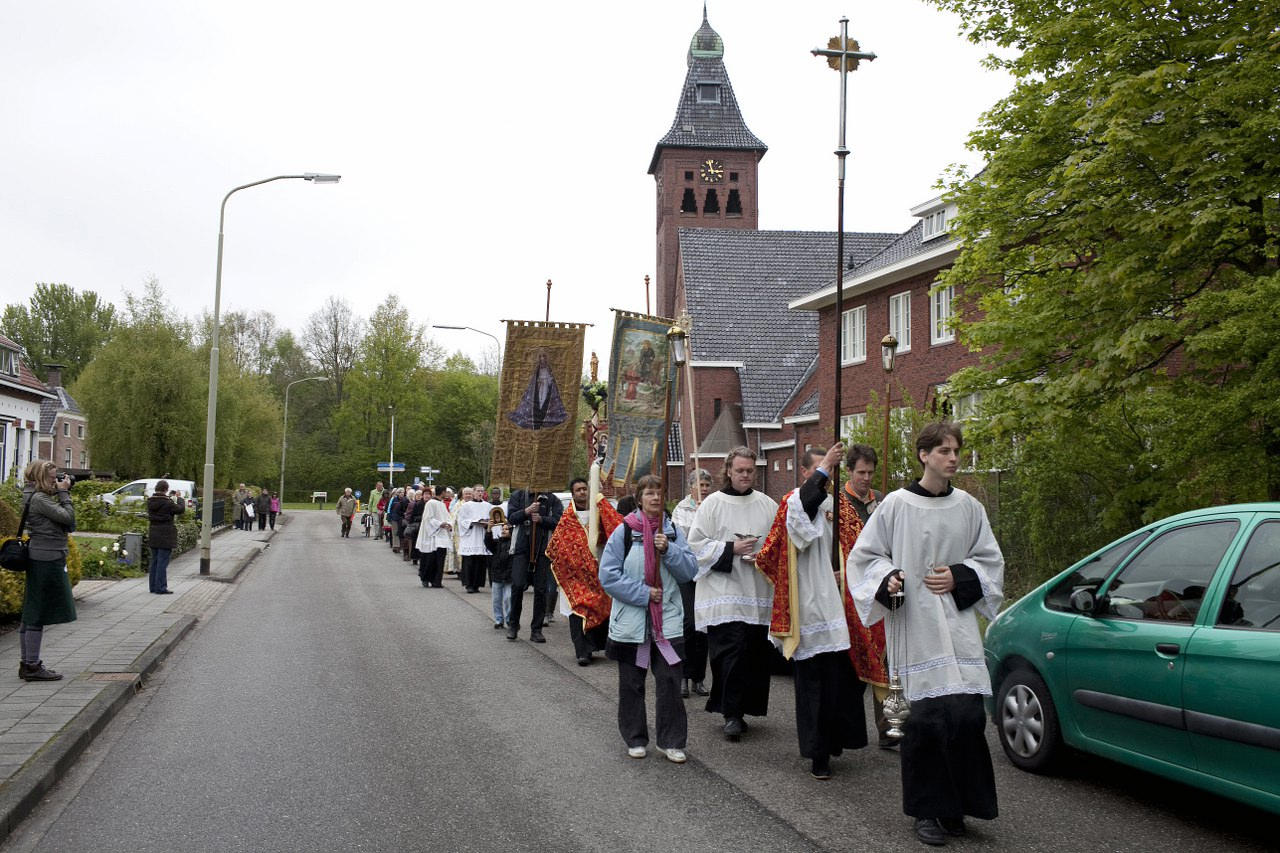
Procession in Wehe-den Hoorn

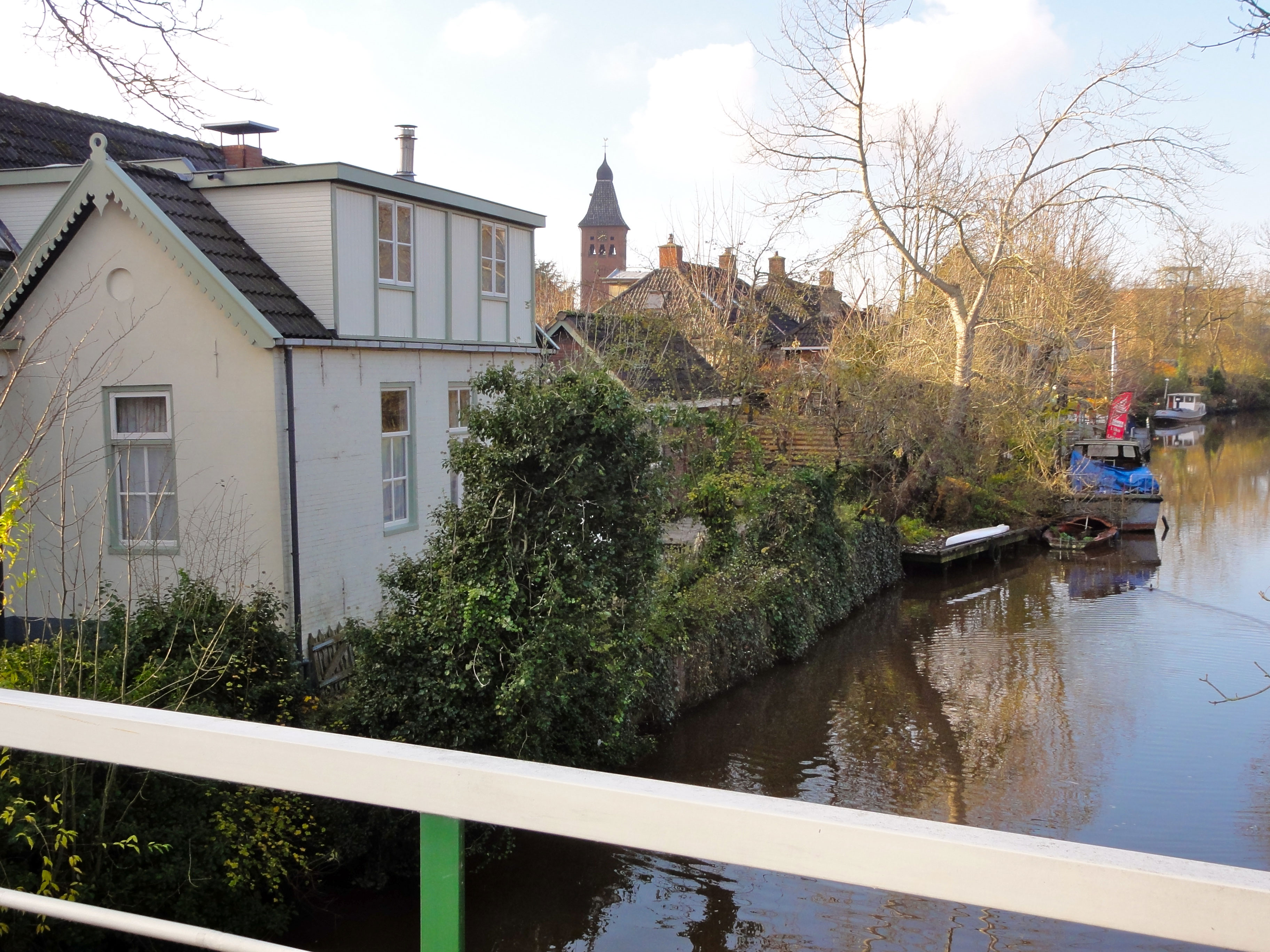
Hoornsevaart

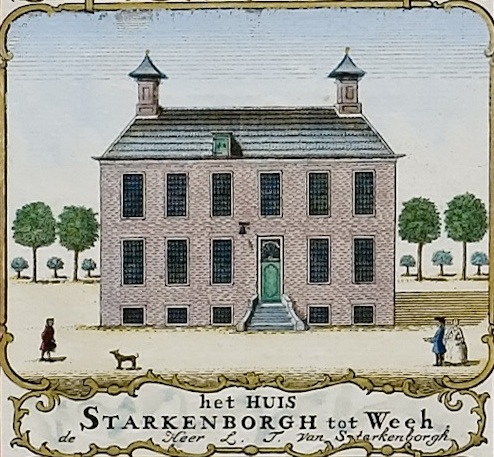
Former Starkenborgh estate
