= Mensingeweer =

- Village
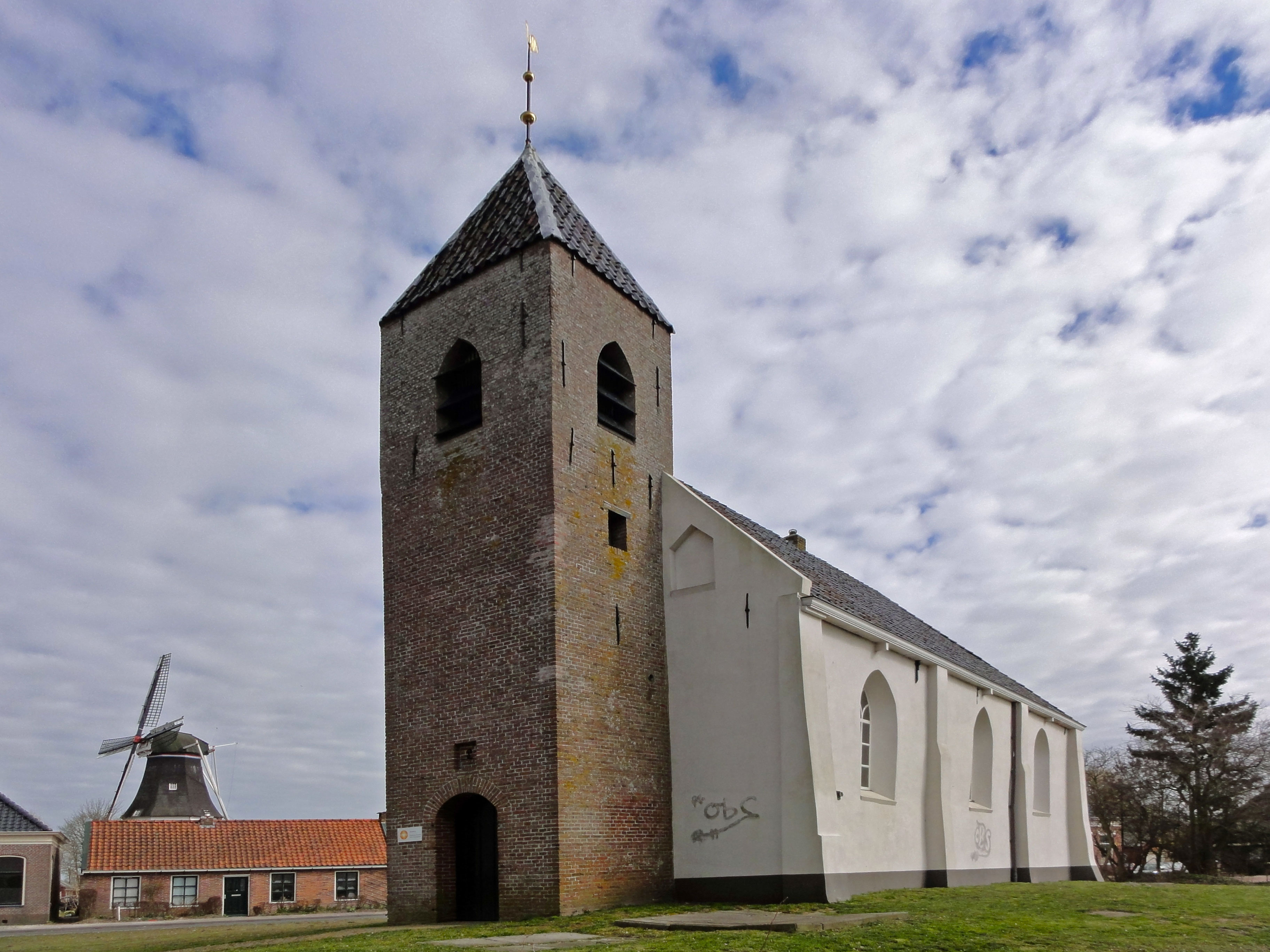
- Michaelkerk with windmill on the left

- Location of Mensingeweer in the province of Groningen Mensingeweer (Netherlands)
- Coordinates: 53.4002°N 6.4808°E
- Country: Netherlands
- Province: Groningen
- Municipality: Het Hogeland

Area
  - Total: 0.25 km^{2} (0.097 sq mi)
- Elevation: 1 m (3.3 ft)

Population (2021)
  - Total: 135
  - Density: 540/km^{2} (1,400/sq mi)
- Time zone: UTC+1 (CET)
  - Summer (DST): UTC+2 (CEST)
- Postal code: 9961
- Dialing code: 0595

Mensingeweer is a small village in the Netherlands; it is located in the municipality of Het Hogeland, Groningen. It lies on the provincial road N361 from Winsum to Leens at the crossroads to Eenrum. The long-distance footpath called Pieterpad runs through the town and the Michaelkerk has an old Arp Schnitger organ that came from a church in Pieterburen and was installed in 1901. The town also has an old windmill called the Hollands Welvaart built in 1855.

== History ==
Mensingeweer is a terp (artificial mount) village from the middle ages. It was first mentioned in 1371 as Mensingheweere. The name means wharf for population belonging to Mense. In 1663, the village started to expand due to the construction of a canal between Winsum and Ulrum.

== Doopsgezinde kerk ==
A Mennonite church was built at Mensingeweer, dedicated on 4 April 1819. It was served by a series of freshly-appointed young ministers from the Amsterdam seminary, but in the 20th century it was increasingly difficult to find ministers willing to serve there and it was demolished in 1959 in favor of a new church in Eenrum.

=== List of Mennonite teachers ===
Called	Teacher	Left
1821	Sijtze Klazes de Waard	1826
1832	Jacobus Leendertz	1837
1838	I. de Stoppelaar Blijdenstein	1839
1840	W. Bruin	1844
1846	Doewe Sieuwertsz Huizinga	1847
1849	Herman ten Cate Hoedemaker	1850
1851	Hendrik Arend van Gelder	1853
1854	Johann Peter Müller	1857
1861	A. Vis	1863
1863	J. A. Oosterbaan	1866
1868	G. Vrijer Azn	1873
1884	Ane Sipkema	1881
1897	Folpmer Jacob de Holl	1900
1901	T. J. van der Ploeg	1903
1904	E. Pekema	1907
1907	C. C. de Maar	1910
1913	F. H. Pasma	1916
1917	P. Vis	1920

== Gallery ==
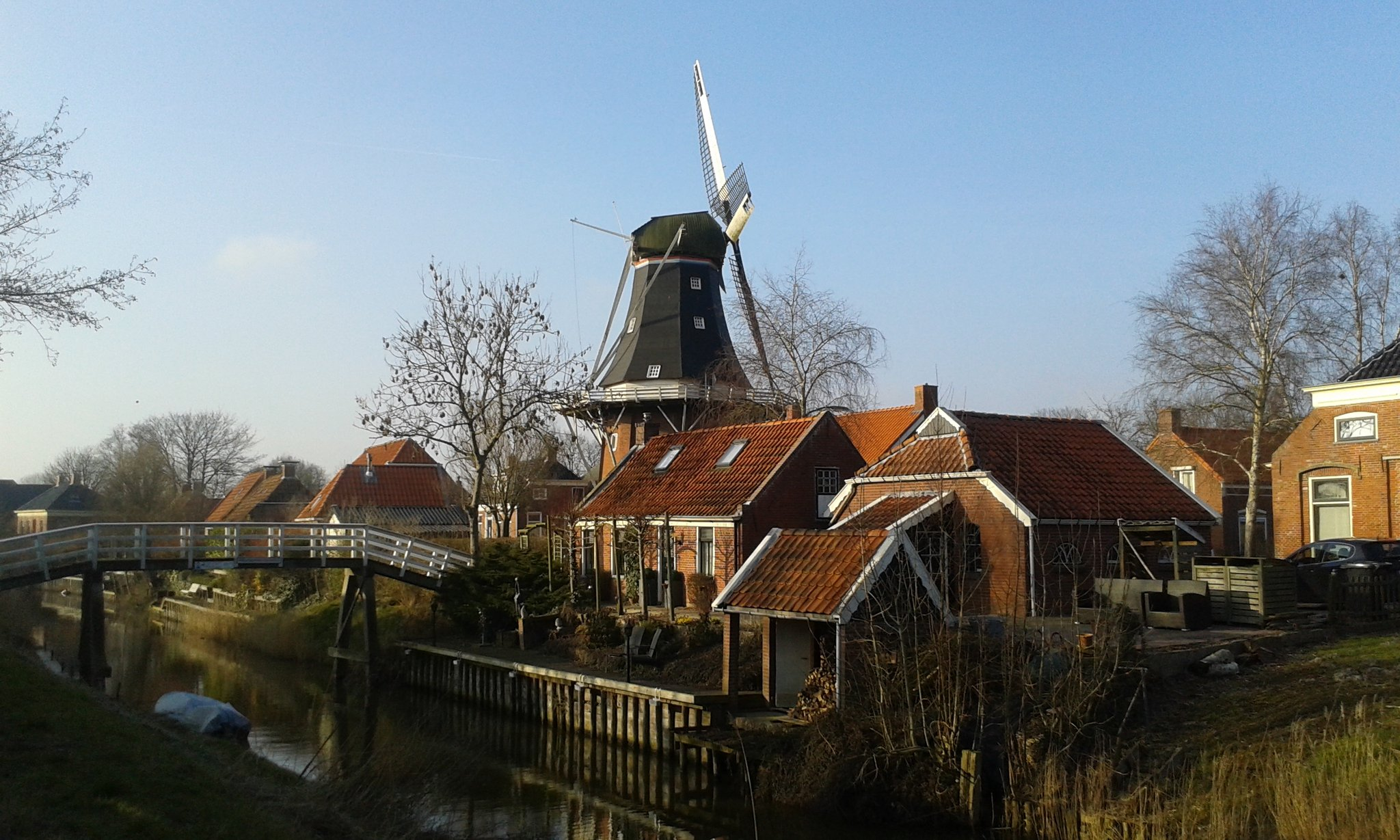
Village with the windmill Hollands Welvaart

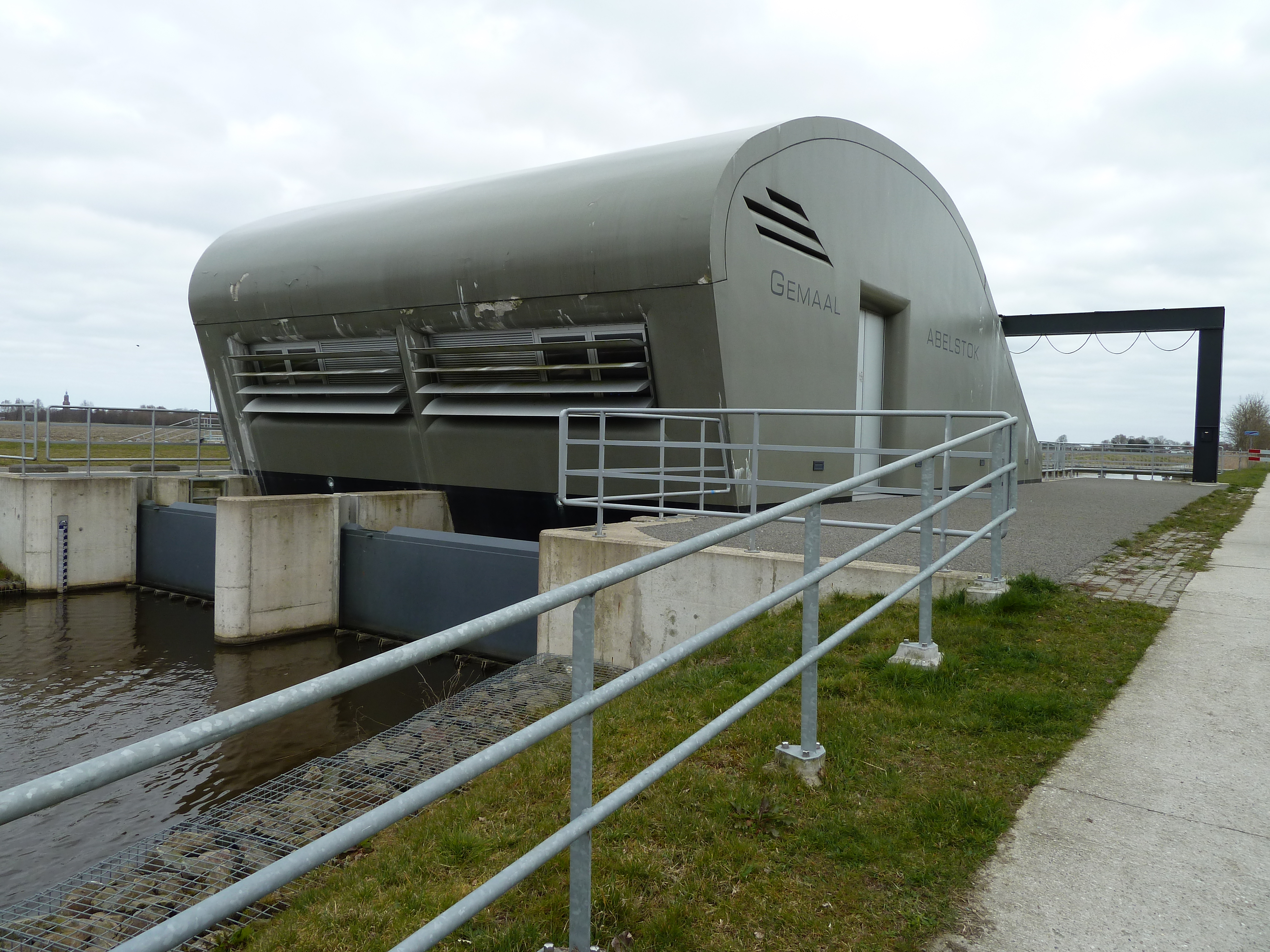
Pumping station

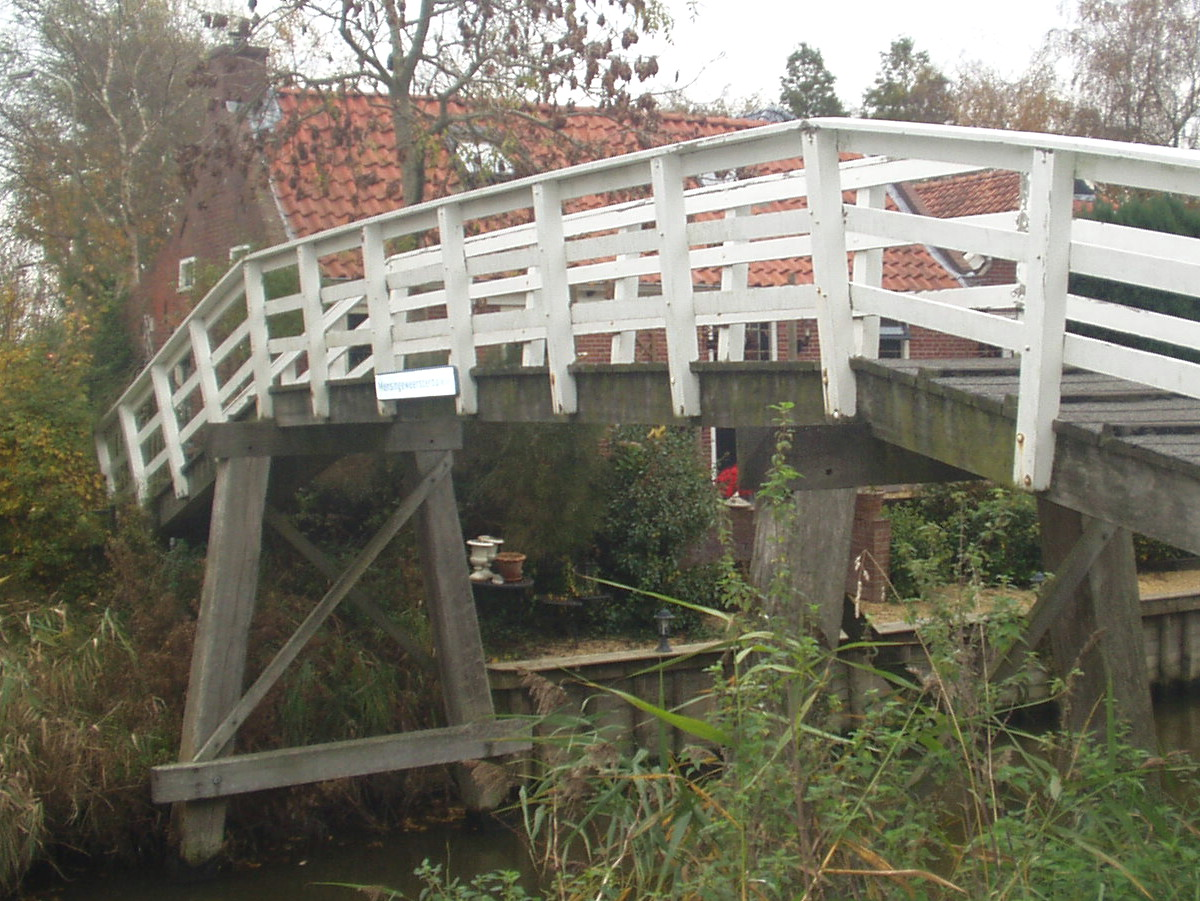
Little bridge
