= Miguel Bejarano Moreno =

Spanish sculptor

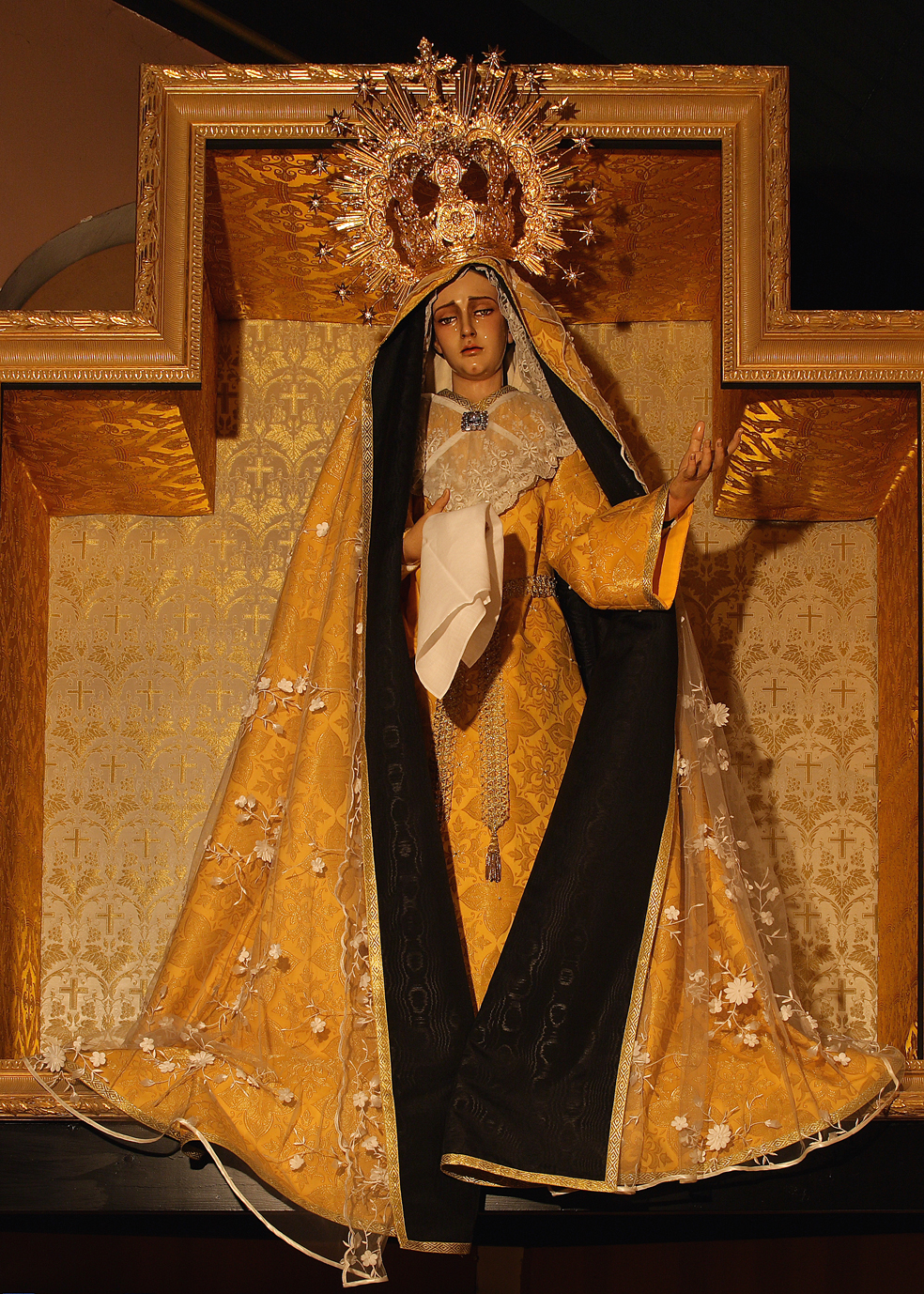
Statue of Our Lady of Warfhuizen, dressed for October.

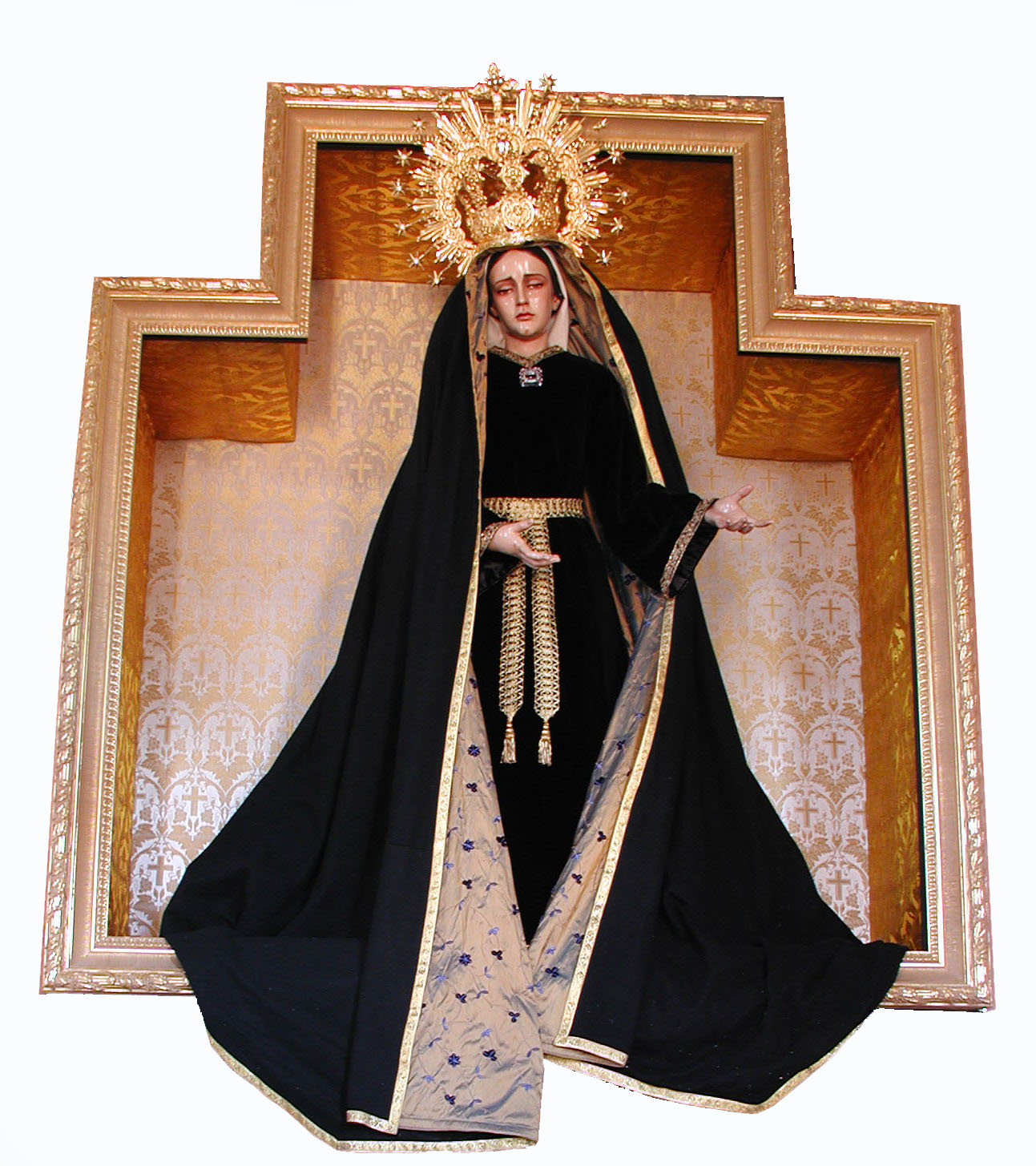
Statue of Our Lady of Warfhuizen, dressed for November, the month of the deceased.

Miguel Bejarano Moreno (born 5 December 1967) is a Spanish sculptor, known for his Roman Catholic statues for the famous processions of the Semana Santa (Holy Week). He lives and works in Seville Spain.

He started his artistic education in 1981 at the Escuela de Artes Aplicadas y Oficios Artísticos (School of applied arts and artistic offices.) He specialized in sculpting under the auspices of the Sevillan sculptor Jesús Santos Calero. After that, he studied molding and casting with Francisco Fatuarte. Eventually he graduated in Applied arts in 1991. He perfected his modelling techniques in the workshop of the famous Sevillan sculptor Luis Alvarez Duarte. Since then he has worked independently in his own workshop.

Although he has made statues of secular subjects, he is known in particular for his religious works. He has worked for several processional brotherhoods (Cofradías) in Andalusia e.g. in Seville, Almería, Cádiz, Granada, Huelva, Jaén and Málaga. He has also worked outside of Andalusia and is known especially for the statue of Our Lady of Hope in Miami and Our Lady of Warfhuizen in the Netherlands.

His statue of Our Lady of the Enclosed Garden in Warfhuizen, the Netherlands has attracted a lot of attention since 2003. It has turned the hermitage chapel of Our Lady into a shrine by attracting thousands of parents worrying about their children. This all happened rather suddenly and without an apparent cause, like an apparition or a miracle. Therefore the many pilgrims themselves are sometimes (mockingly) referred to as the 'Miracle of Warfhuizen.'

== See also ==
- Roman Catholic Marian art
- Our Lady of Sorrows
