= Sorrowful Mother of Warfhuizen =

Statue at the hermitage of Warfhuizen, Groningen, Netherlands

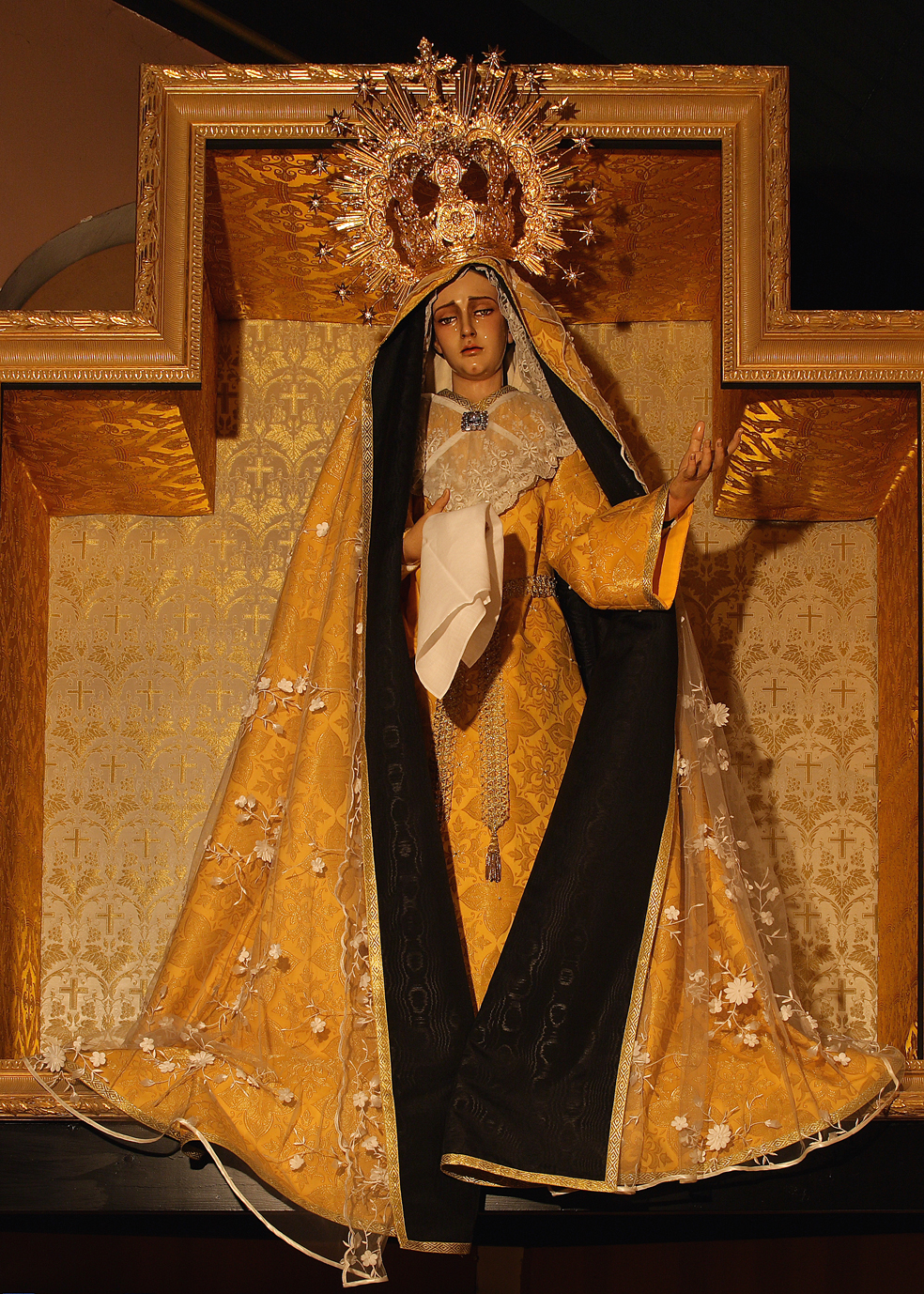

Our Lady of the Garden Enclosed
- Venerated in: Roman Catholic Church
- Major shrine: Hermitage of Warfhuizen, Netherlands
- Feast: September 15
- Attributes: Statue of Our Lady of Sorrows holding a white handkerchief, gold crown and jewelry, richly embroidered mantle
- Patronage: Warfhuizen, desperate situations, people with illnesses

The Sorrowful Mother of Warfhuizen (Dutch: De Bedroefde Moeder van Warfhuizen) is the name most often used for Our Lady of the Enclosed Garden (Dutch: Onze Lieve Vrouwe van de Besloten Tuin), the statue that is kept at the hermitage of Warfhuizen. Since 2003 it has drawn many pilgrims to the village in the north of Groningen. It is also popularly called Our Lady of Warfhuizen or Mary of Warfhuizen.

== History ==
In 2001 a hermitage with adjacent chapel was established by Catholics in the former reformed church in the Groninger village of Warfhuizen. In 2003 a lifesize Spanish processional statue of Our Lady of Sorrows was placed there, with the name of 'Our Lady of the Garden Enclosed' (also the title of the hermitage and chapel). The statue was cut by Sevillan sculptor Miguel Bejarano Moreno, one of the sculptors specialised in making statues for the famous procession in Holy Week in Andalusia.

=== Miracle of Warfhuizen ===
After the statue was placed in the chapel the increasing number of visitors to the (very remote) chapel began to be noticed. It became apparent that many people came to Warfhuizen, especially for Mary. At the start, these were mostly Spanish expats and Latin Americans, but Catholics from the area itself, who had been missing such a chapel, soon followed. The pilgrims then came from increasingly further away, including Germany and Flanders, to Warfhuizen. The large number of pilgrims from Limburg is striking. This phenomenon is sometimes referred to as the 'miracle of Warfhuizen'. This term, originally probably a joke, often leads to confusion. What it means is that it is miraculous that the chapel has become a pilgrimage site, especially without a miracle of apparition having taken place.

=== Fathers and mothers ===
Our Lady of the Enclosed Garden represents Mary's pity for her Son. That is probably the reason why she draws many pilgrims who have worries about their children to Warfhuizen, as is clear from the book of intentions. When leafing through it, one will find many heartfelt cries concerning young people afflicted by illness or accidents, or whose lives went off the track. During the pilgrimage season (in Warfhuizen that is from roughly the middle of April to the patronage feast day (15 September) groups also regularly visit.

=== Guild ===
A male-female guild has been established devoted to Our Lady of the Enclosed Garden, with the purpose of praying for the wellbeing of Church and diocese. At least once a year, on the Saturday before Mother's Day, there is a Mass followed by a procession from the parish church in Wehe-den Hoorn to the hermitage to have Eucharistic Adoration. The guild also issues Holy cards and pilgrimage vanes and assists the hermit in receiving groups of pilgrims.

=== Processions ===
The many processions, small and large, which have travelled to Warfhuizen from Wehe-den Hoorn in recent years, are notable. The largest to date has been the light procession on the even of Palm Sunday 2008, organised by the youth platform of the Diocese of Groningen-Leeuwarden.

=== The swapping of the handkerchief ===
A special custom in Warfhuizen is the "swapping of the handkerchief". In Warfhuizen, Mary holds a white handkerchief to wipe her tears. Faithful ask for that handkerchief in exchange for a new one they bring themselves or buy on the spot. They primarily give Mary's handkerchief to sick people, but also to people who are faced with a difficult task (such as an exam).

=== Mantle and other vestments ===
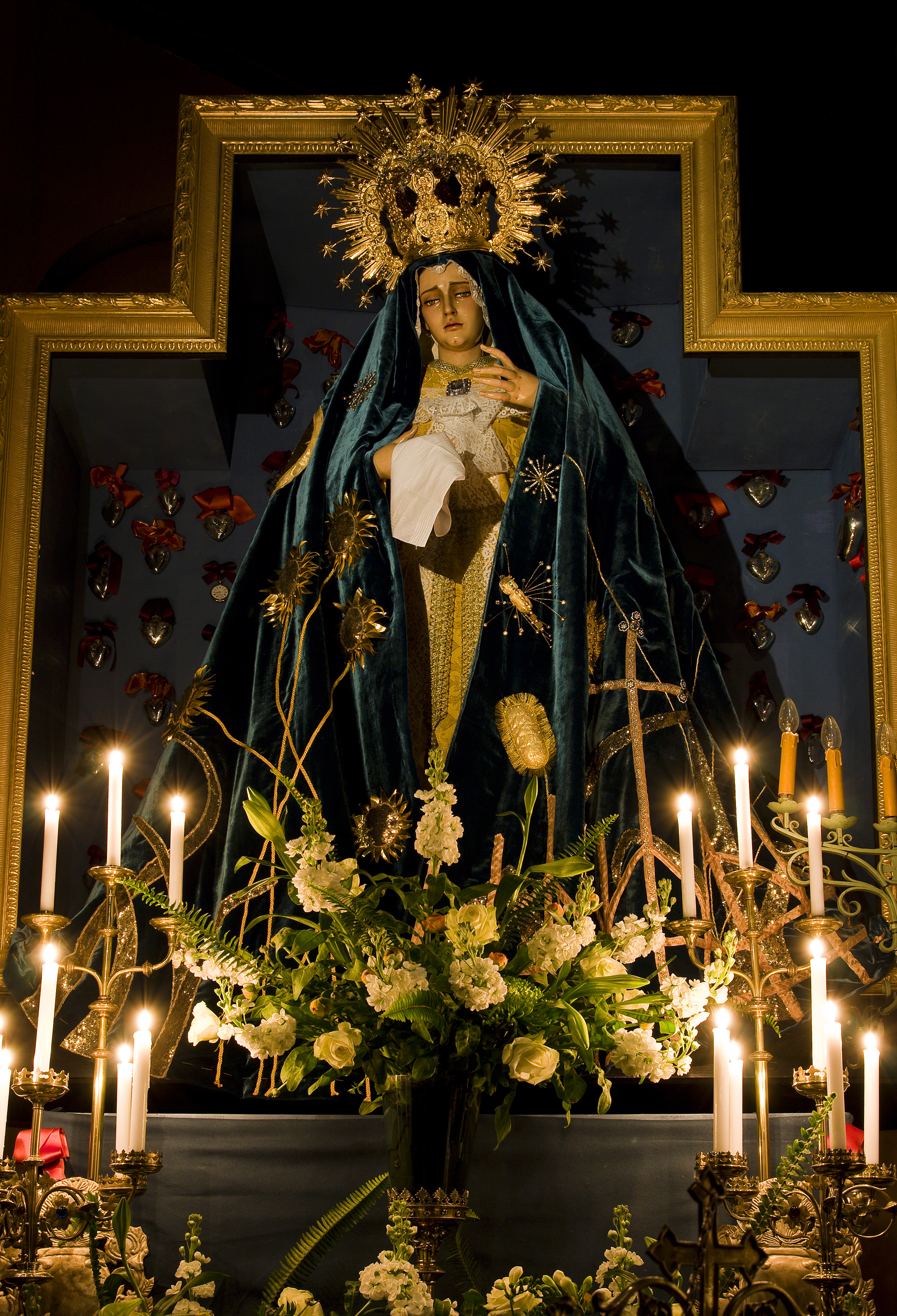
Our Lady of the Enclosed Garden wearing the festive mantle made by Koeiman

Most statues of Mary wear an especially decorative and rich mantle for festive occasions, called a Staatsiemantel. It is usually worn during the month of Mary (May) and sometimes on major Marian feast days. In 2009, Groninger fashion designer Ramiro Koeiman offered to design and make such a mantle for Our Lady of Warfhuizen. The mantle was finished in 2010 and was blessed on 8 May of that year by Father Wagenaar, dean of the cathedral of Groningen.

Our Lady of Warfhuizen has several mantles which she wears over the course of the liturgical year. Some of these refer to the Andalusian origins of the statue, but most have been adapted to the Dutch Catholic tradition since the Counter Reformation. The guild believes that Warfhuizen is a Groninger devotion, despite the origins of the statue as such.

== Literature ==
- Kluis-en Bedevaartkapel Warfhuizen. Kleine Kunstführer Nr. 2717. Schnell & Steiner, Regensburg 2008, ISBN 978-3-7954-6797-5

== See also ==
- Holy Week in Spain
