= Ailke Westerhof =

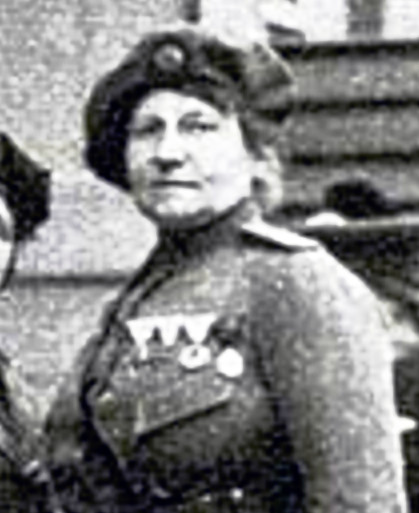
- Born: April 27, 1876; Leens, Groningen, Netherlands
- Died: September 4, 1946 (aged 70); Leens
- Honors: Knight of the Order of Orange-Nassau

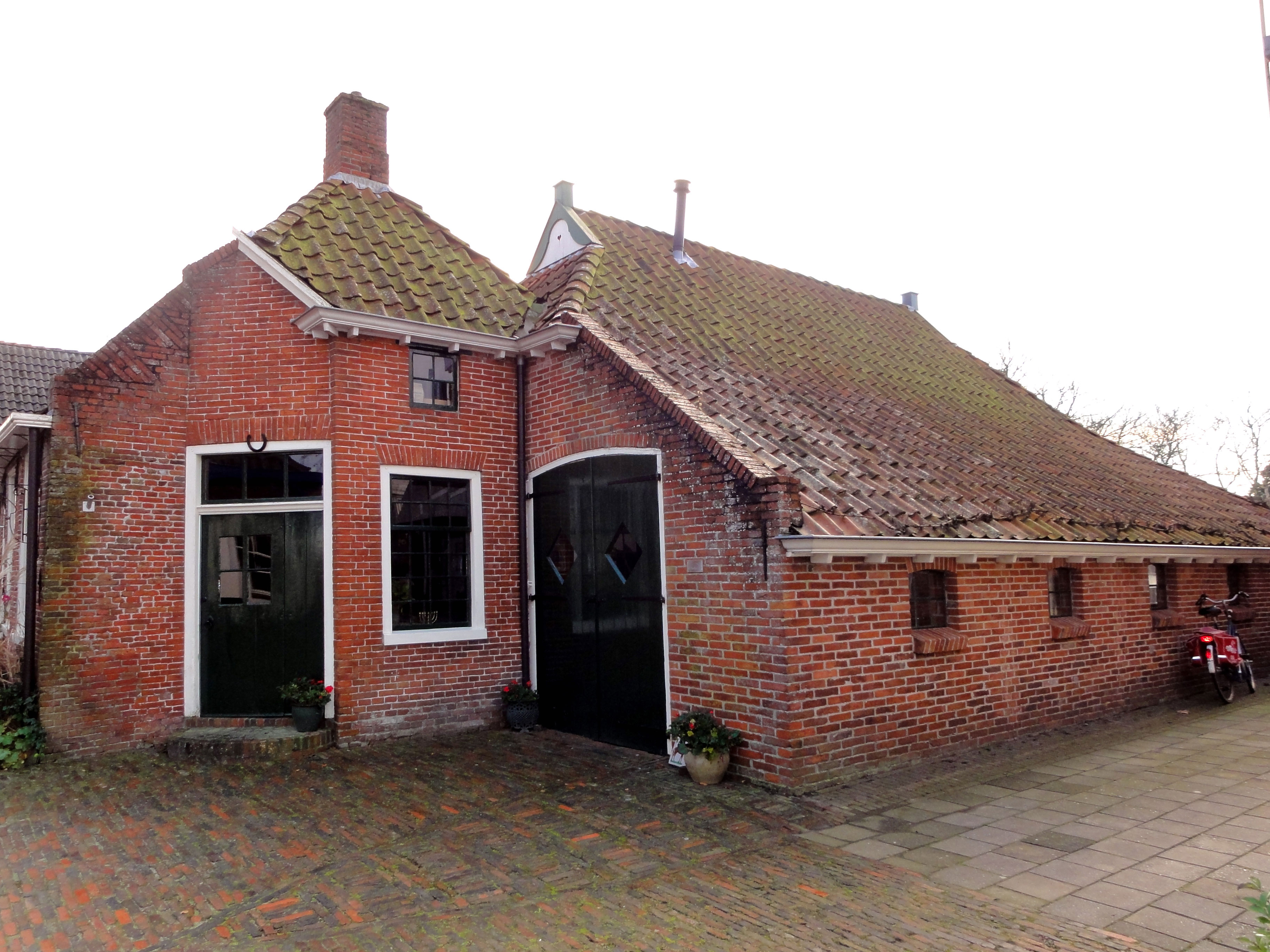
Westerhof's place of birth in Leens

Ailke Westerhof (Leens, 27 April 1876 - Leens, 4 September 1946) was a Dutch nurse who served in the Red Cross during the Balkan Wars and World War I.

== Biography ==
Westerhof was born in Leens, Groningen, the daughter of the blacksmiths Ebel Westerhof and Itje de Vries. From 1912 to 1919, she worked as a nurse during the Balkan Wars and during the First World War in Hungary and Serbia. Under doctor Arius van Tienhovenhe she nursed typhus patients in Valjevo. Subsequently, she was employed by the Amsterdamse Vrijwillige Burgerwacht and as a teacher at the Red Cross in Amsterdam. In 1924, she was appointed Knight in the Order of Orange-Nassau. In 1935, she was awarded the Florence Nightingale Medal by Princess Juliana. She also received several awards in Serbia for her work, such as the Cross of Mercy and a medal for bravery. She died in September 1946 in her hometown, Leens, at the age of 70.

Ailke Westerhof died in the same house in which she had been born. The house and forge where her parents and brothers worked is now a national monument. It was threatened with demolition, but restoration began in 1975, and the street has been renamed 'Zuster A. Westerhofstraat'. Her portrait was painted in 1924 by the artist Bart Peizel.
