= Warfhuizen =

- Village
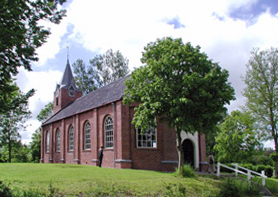
- Church in c. 2004

- Location of Warfhuizen in the province of Groningen Warfhuizen (Netherlands)
- Coordinates: 53°20′27″N 6°25′32″E
- Country: Netherlands
- Province: Groningen
- Municipality: Het Hogeland

Area
  - Total: 0.31 km^{2} (0.12 sq mi)
- Elevation: 1.6 m (5.2 ft)

Population (2021)
  - Total: 205
  - Density: 660/km^{2} (1,700/sq mi)
- Time zone: UTC+1 (CET)
  - Summer (DST): UTC+2 (CEST)
- Postal code: 9963
- Dialing code: 0595

Warfhuizen (Gronings: Waarfhoezen) is a village in province of Groningen, located in the northern part of the Netherlands. It is part of the municipality of Het Hogeland.

Warfhuizen consists of two man-made mounds, called wierden, designed to escape the floodwaters of the Wadden, which flooded the whole region several times a year before dykes had been coed. The smaller mound was originally raised to protect a separate village called Burum. The village church stands on the larger mound.

== The Church ==
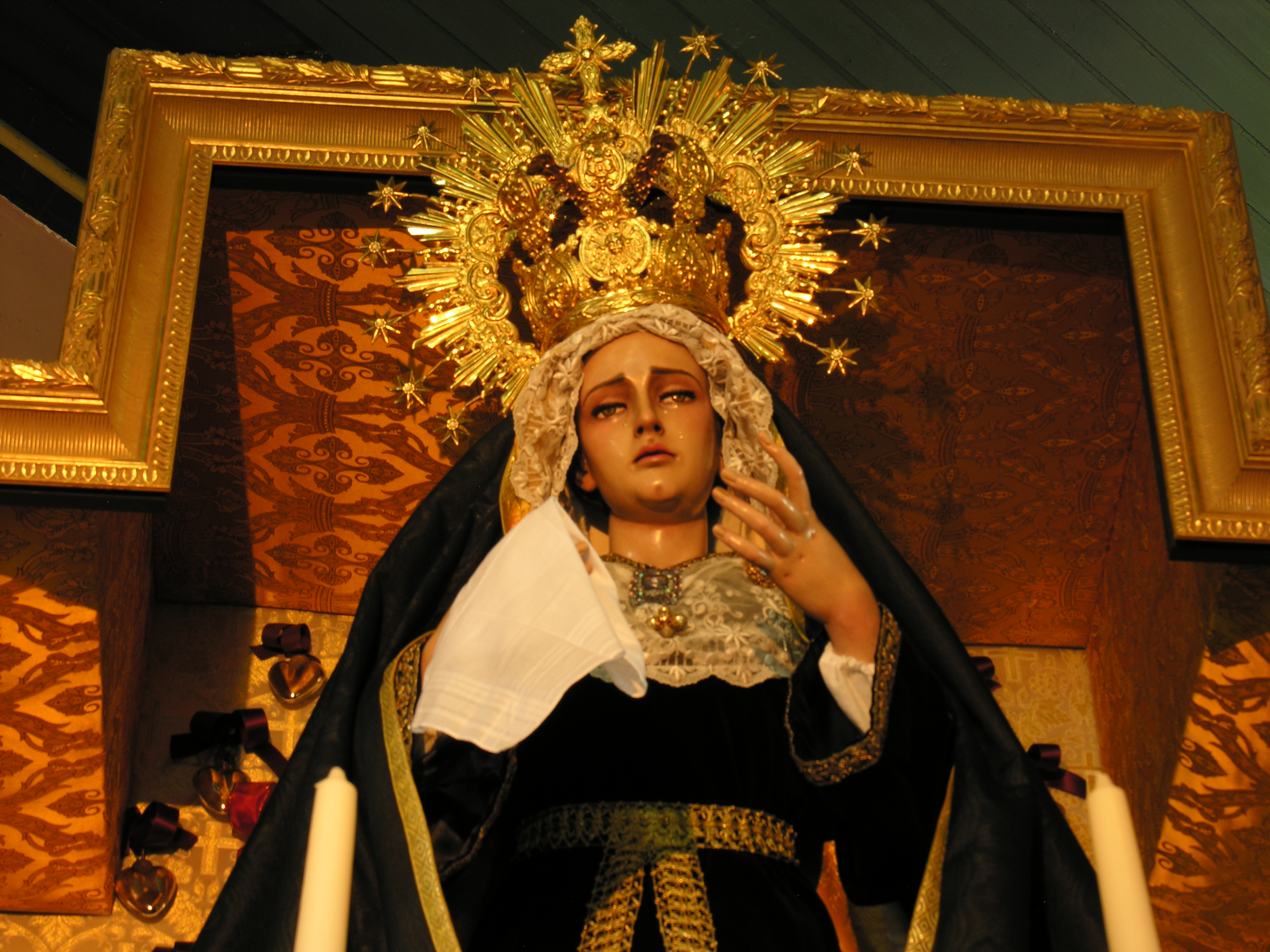
"Our Lady the Garden Enclosed", statue in the hermitage church of Warfhuizen.

The church belongs to the hermitage of Our Lady of the Enclosed Garden, one of the few hermitages in the Netherlands still inhabited by a hermit.

The church, which was first constructed in the 13th century, was replaced by a neo-classical building in 1858. Only the bell survived the ages and is even one of the oldest churchbells in the Netherlands. The building is dedicated to Saint Ludger and Our Lady under the title of "the Enclosed Garden".

The present organ was built in 1910, but was in fact reconstructed from two organs of a much earlier date (17th and 18th century.)

The church is especially known for its statue of the Mother of Sorrows, sculpted by one of the renowned procession-sculptors of Seville, Miguel Bejarano Moreno. It is because of this very Andalusian image that some Spaniards living in the Netherlands use Warfhuizen as a place of (unofficial) pilgrimage. In the last years their habit spread to all Catholics in the region and even beyond: Warfhuizen became the northernmost Marian sanctuary of continental Europe.

A peculiar custom, unique for this shrine, is 'the trading of the handkerchief'. It is said that visitors bring a new white handkerchief and ask the hermit to swap it with the one held by the sorrowful Virgin whose handkerchief is then presented to someone sick, lonely or elderly in the audience. Little is documented about this alleged custom. The origins of this particular custom are unknown, although a widespread rumor tells that it started with catholic pilgrims from the south of India and Sri Lanka, but the reasons behind this rumor are unexplained.

== Gallery ==
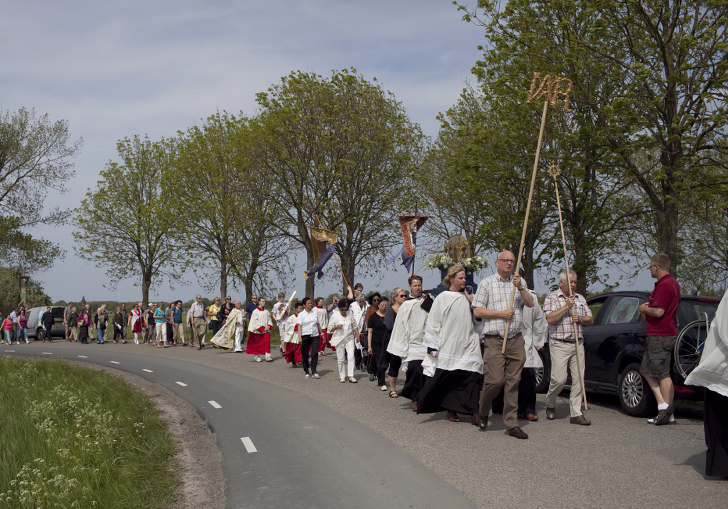
Pilmgrimage

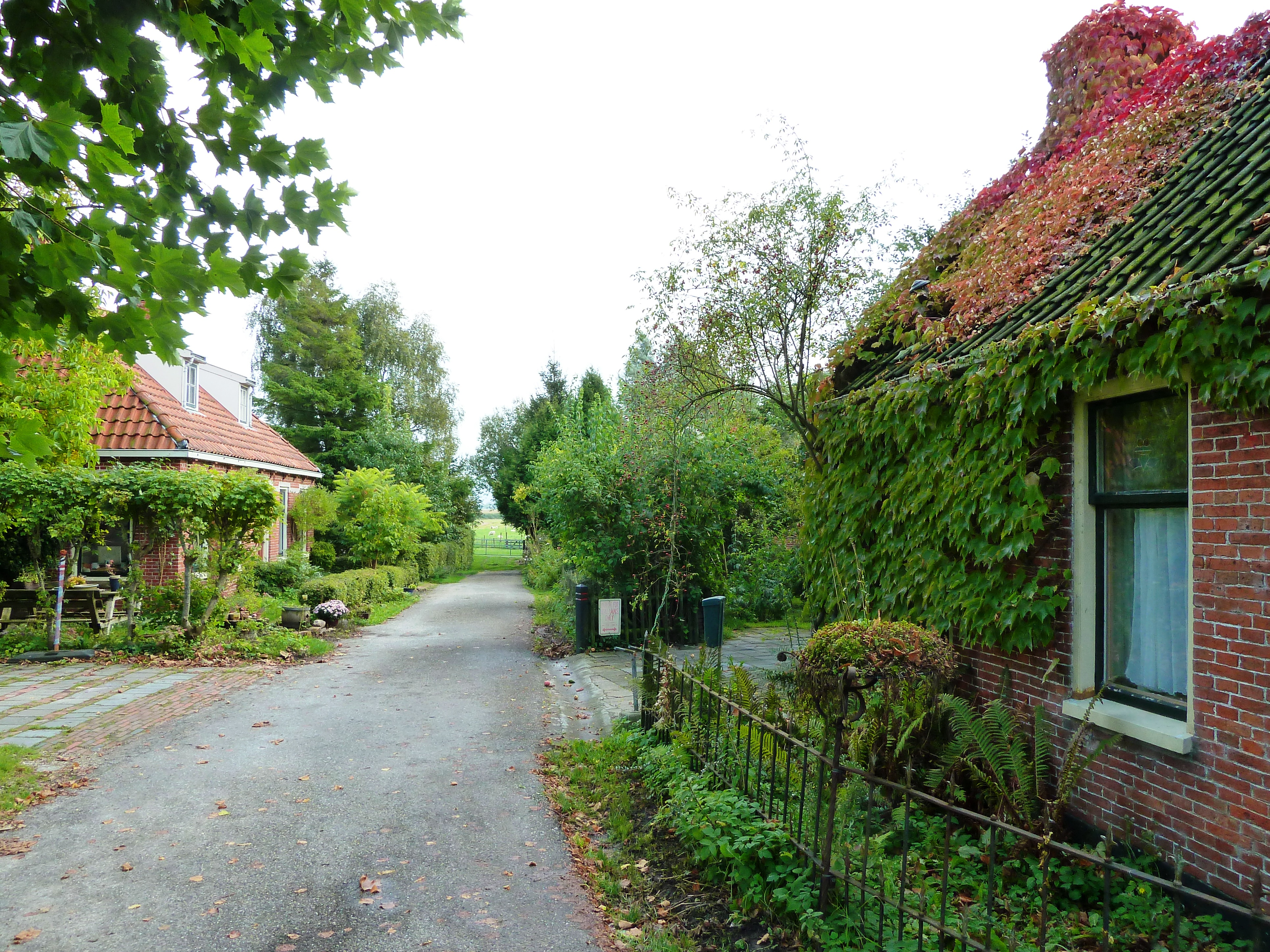
Street in Warffhuizen

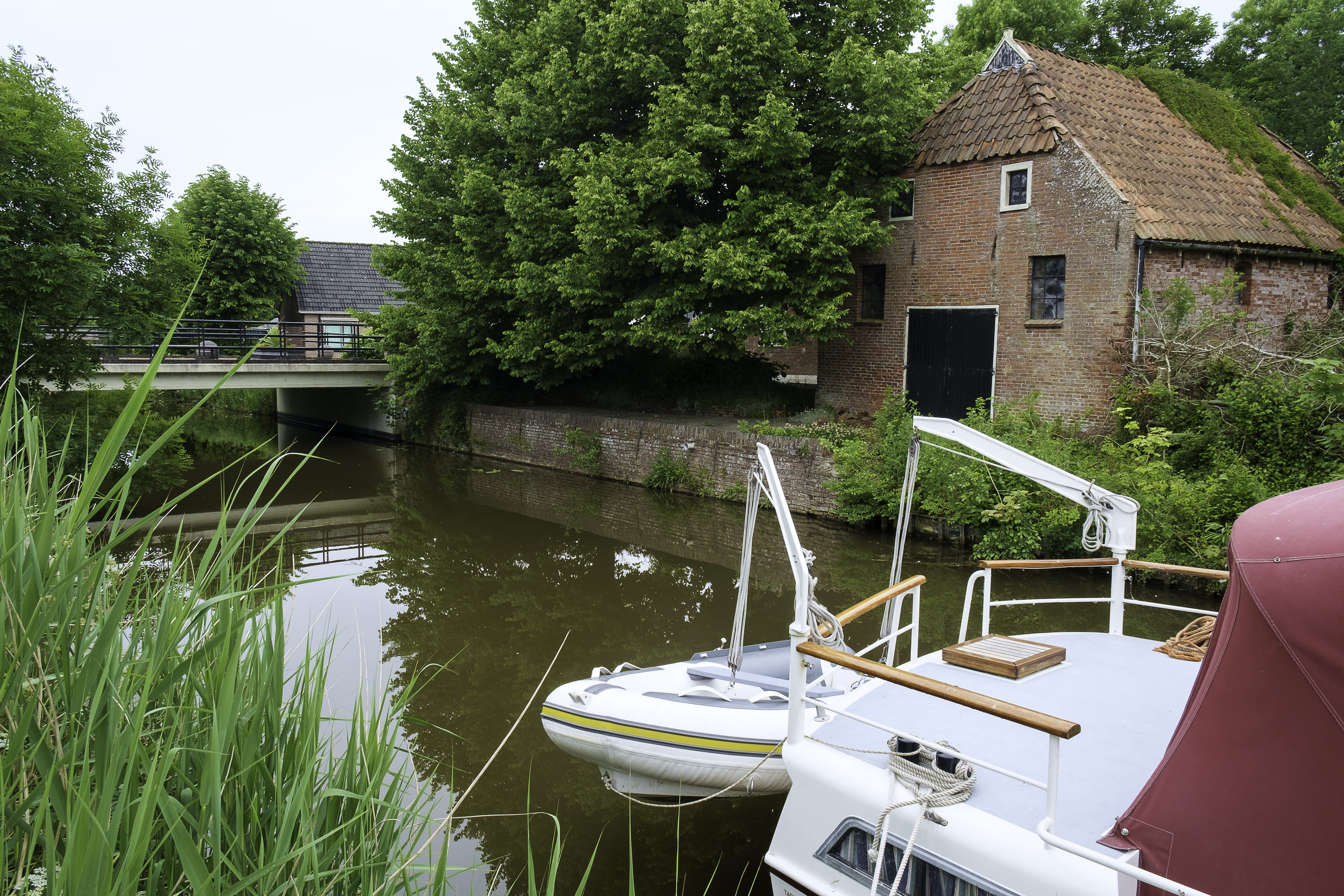
Canal in Warffhuizen

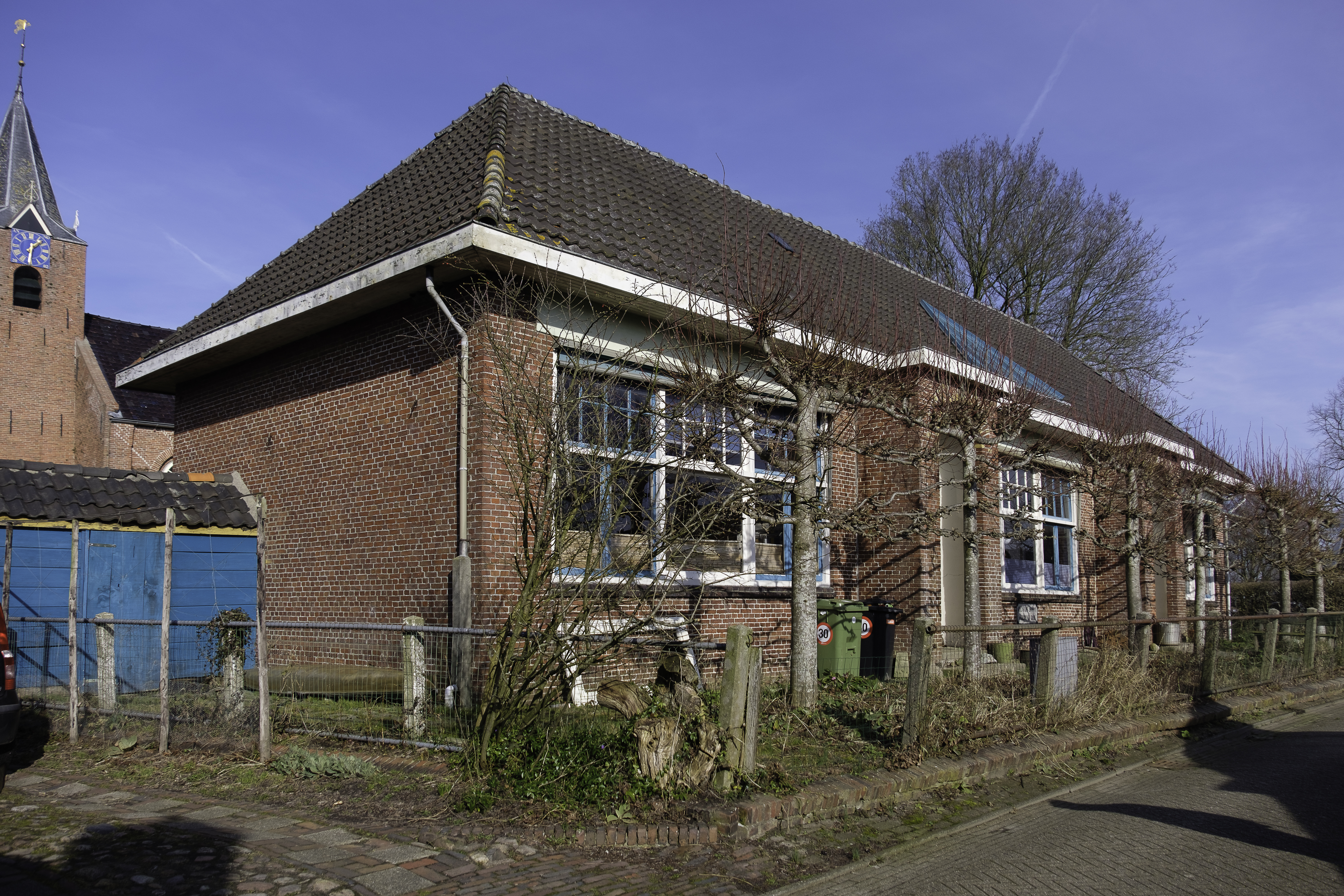
Former school
