= Our Lady of the Enclosed Garden =

Coordinates: 53.3428°N 6.4249°E

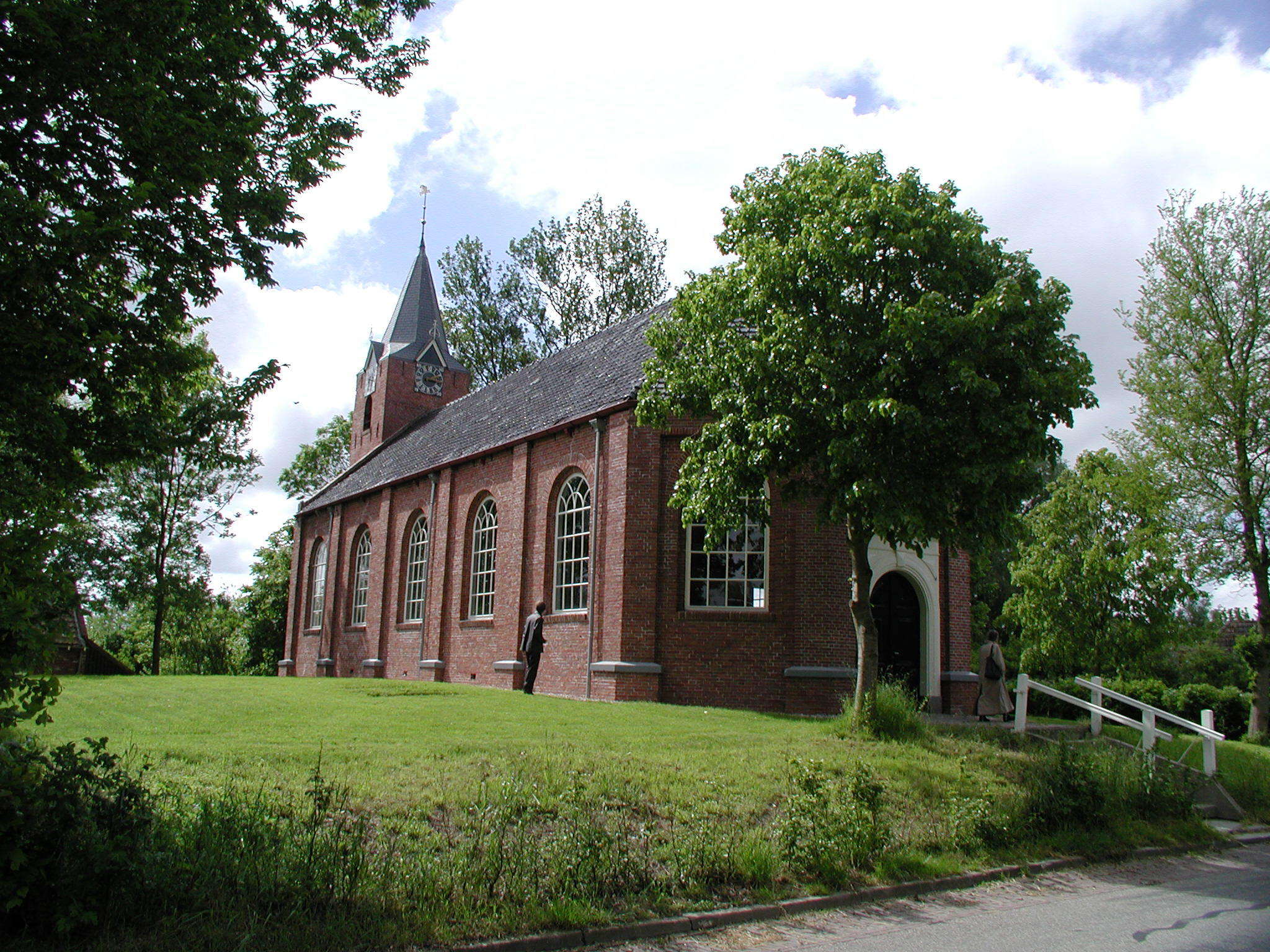
Hermitage-church of Warfhuizen

The Roman Catholic hermitage of Our Lady of the Enclosed Garden is situated in the former Reformed church of Warfhuizen, a village in the province of Groningen, in the north of the Netherlands. It is the only Dutch hermitage currently inhabited by a hermit. The name draws upon the traditional epithet for the Virgin Mary (“Our Lady”) of the hortus conclusus or enclosed garden, a reference to the Song of Songs that indicates Mary’s “perpetual virginity and at the same time her fruitful maternity.”

The hermitage was founded in 2001 as the dwelling of a diocesan hermit. As is typical of Dutch hermitages, it includes a public chapel that has a distinct role in popular devotions, in this case, to the Virgin Mary. It is the northernmost Marian shrine in the Netherlands.

== History ==
The hermitage in Warfhuizen is a continuation of the tradition of hermits which arose in Limburg and North Brabant, following the Counter Reformation. The last brother of that tradition died in 1930 in de Schaelsberg hermitage in Valkenburg aan de Geul. Unlike most hermitages abroad, these featured a public chapel which often played a part in local devotions.

After a slow decline since the 1880s, the number of Roman Catholic hermits in Europe started to increase again towards the end of the 20th century, although the Netherlands initially lagged in this development. There have always been members of religious orders who lived as hermits, but 'true hermits' became extinct after 1930, and hermitages were left empty and mostly disappeared. In 2001, the empty Protestant church in the village of Warfhuizen was acquired by Catholics, and a simple dwelling was built into the bay adjacent to the tower, which has since been inhabited by a hermit named Brother Hugo. The rest of the building serves as a chapel. Brother Hugo belongs to the Diocese of Groningen-Leeuwarden, and was ordained a priest September 2015.

Since the Second Vatican Council revitalised the eremitic ideal, a small amount of new legislation has been created. The Code of Canon Law, can. 603, requires hermits to be more secluded than was the existing custom in the Netherlands. As a result, there is an enclosed area in Warfhuizen in which the hermit lives and works. In the chapel, this is demarcated by the large rood screen which separates the choir from the nave that the public may access.

== Office and customs ==
Similar to contemplative monasteries, the Office is kept in Warfhuizen. In Western Christianity, that is often prayed in accordance with the precepts of Saint Benedict, but in 2009, the hermit switched to the Office of Saint John Cassian from the 5th century. John of Cassian based his schedule on the customs of the hermits in the Egyptian desert, the so-called Desert Fathers, making it very suitable for hermits.

Instead of the eight (usually short) Benedictine offices, Cassian prescribes two (longer) vigils, one at the start and one at the end of the night. In Warfhuizen, these vigils are sung softly in Latin. The other hours do not have an office with Psalms, but are prayed in silence using the Jesus Prayer.

As such, the Office currently used in Warfhuizen clearly deviates from that of the ancient Dutch hermits, who usually used an abbreviated Liturgy of the Hours of Benedict. The influence of the Limburgian tradition on the atmosphere in the hermitage remains clearly noticeable through the various additions from popular devotions, such as praying the Rosary and various litanies, which are sung out loud at various moments during the day. The chapel’s decorations are also a continuation of 17th century examples, through Baroque elements. The devotion to Saint Gerlach of Houthem, of whom there is a reliquary in the retable of the right side altar, has a special place in the hermitage. Saint Anthony Abbot is also especially honoured, with a relic of his kept in the Holy Cross altar.

In addition to the old southern tradition, there are also other influences on the liturgy. The fact that some volunteers are Russian Orthodox has led to the Jesus Prayer being sung in Greek after Compline. The Carthusian tradition is also noticeable in the manner of Gregorian chant.

=== Eucharistic Adoration ===
Since May 2009, the Bishop of Groningen-Leeuwarden has permitted Eucharistic adoration at the hermitage. Since then, daily adoration and the Rosary for pilgrims takes place at 4 pm.

== Warfhuizen as a Marian pilgrimage site ==
Most visitors specifically come to venerate Mary. This began after a life-size processional statue of Our Lady of Sorrows, named the “Sorrowful Mother of Warfhuizen”, was enshrined in the chapel. The statue so appealed to the local and foreign faithful that the chapel became a pilgrimage site.

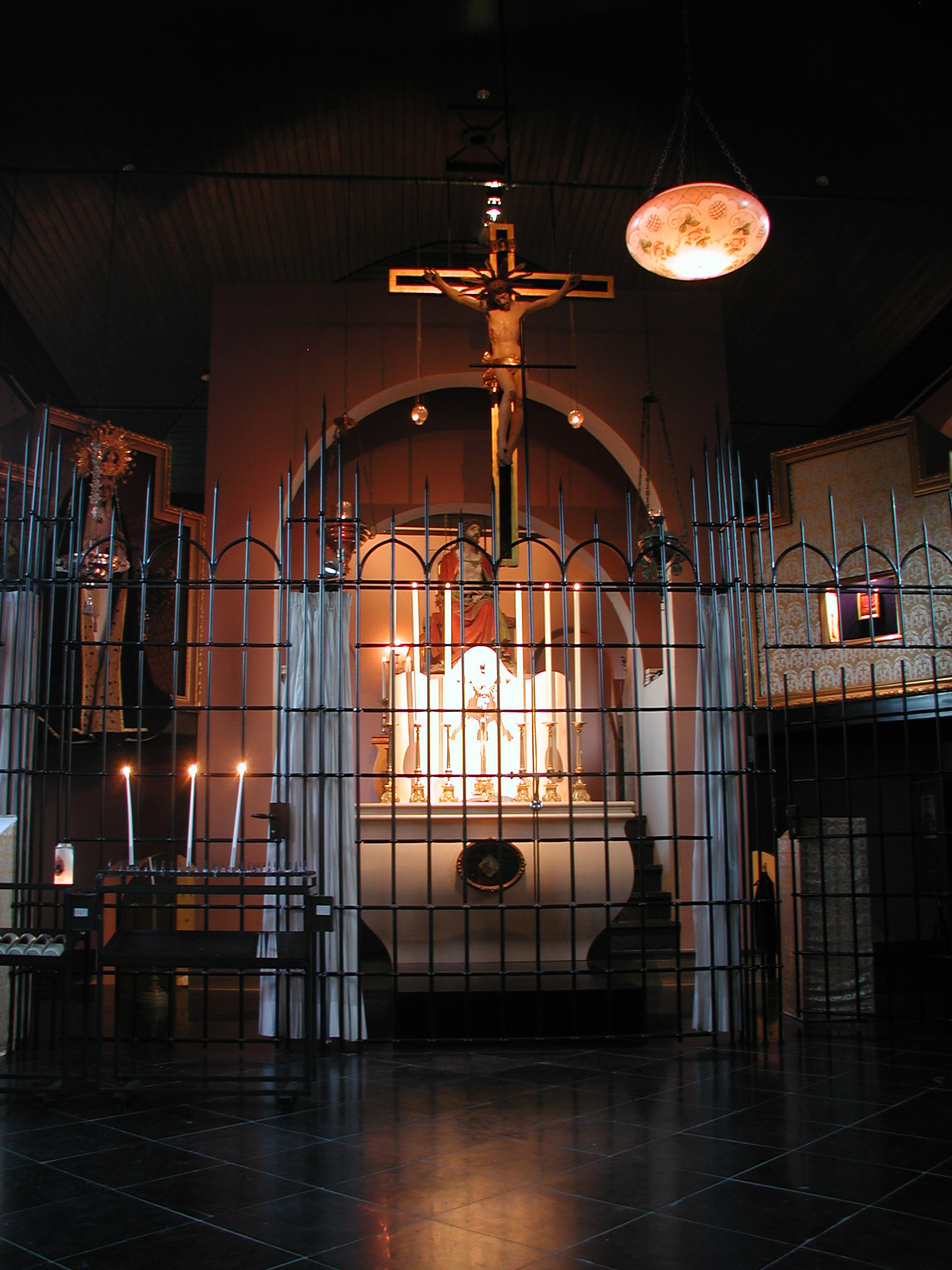
The enclosure-grill of the rood screen

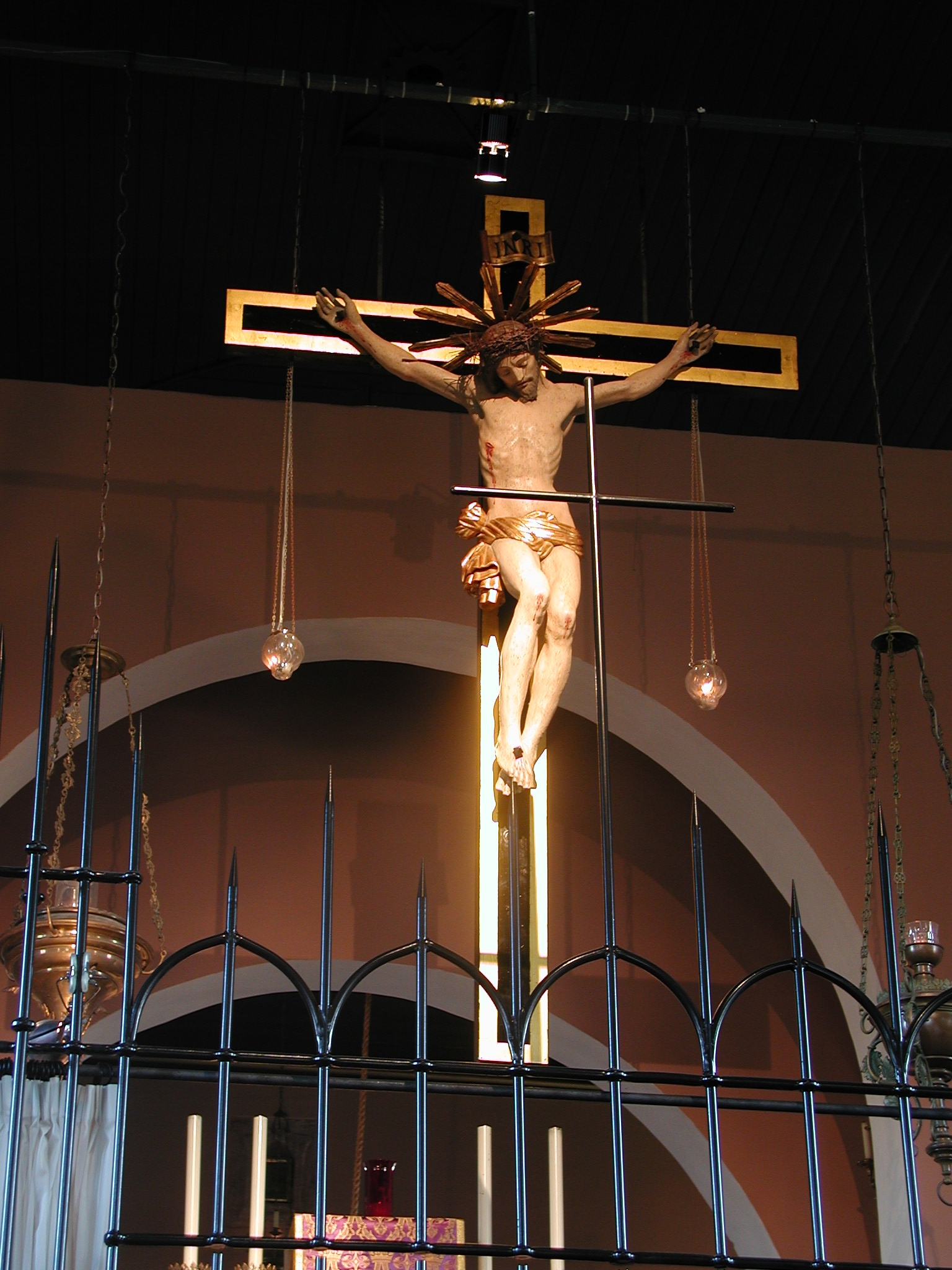
The great cross, a recent copy after the Italian sculptor Pietro Tacca

== See also ==
- Marian art in the Catholic Church
- Marian devotions
- Roman Catholic Mariology
