= Leens =

- Village
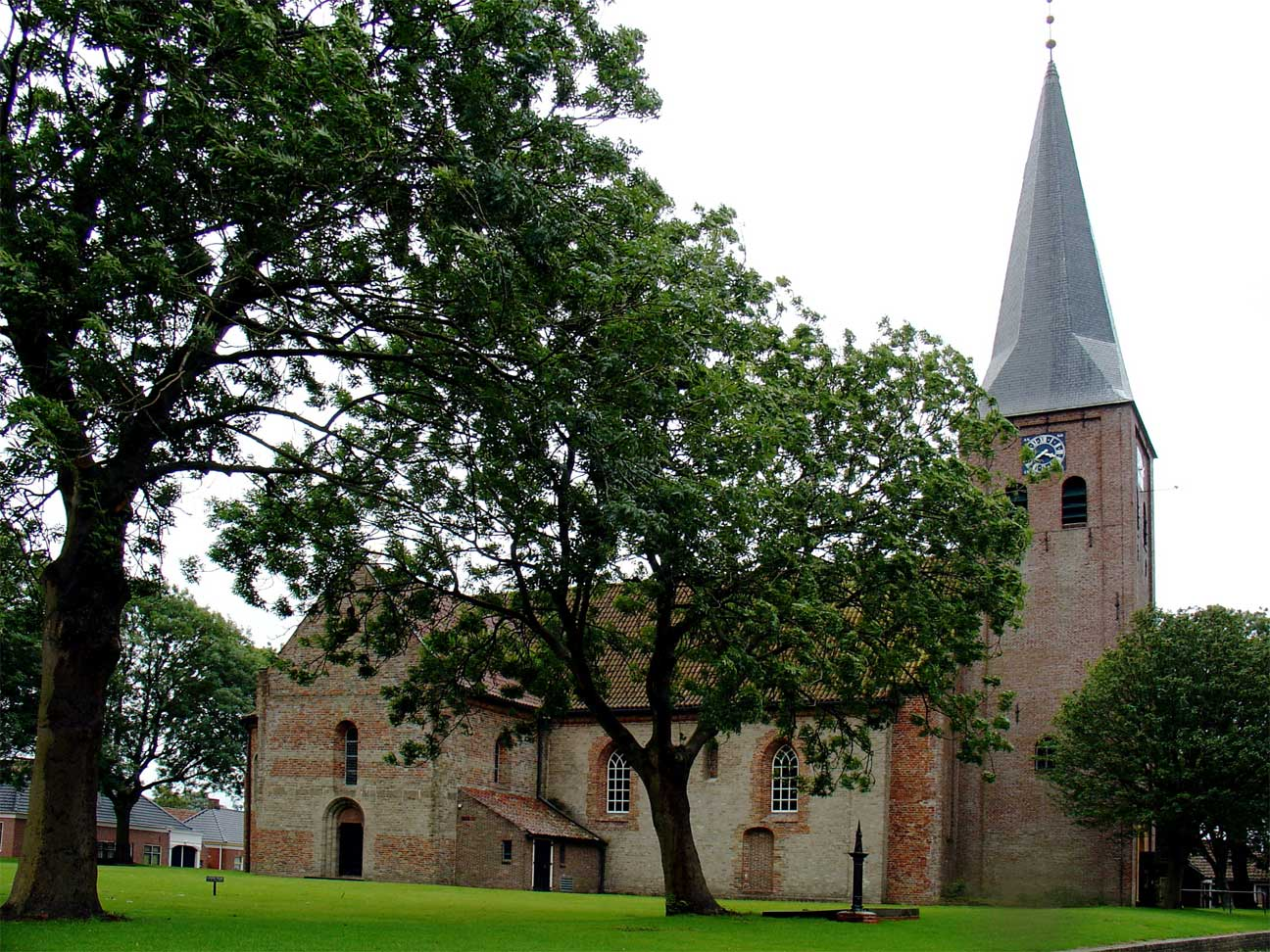
- Petruskerk in 2007

- Flag Coat of arms

- Location of Leens in the province of Groningen Leens (Netherlands)
- Coordinates: 53°21.62′N 6°22.61′E
- Country: Netherlands
- Province: Groningen
- Municipality: Het Hogeland

Area
  - Total: 35.58 km^{2} (13.74 sq mi)
- Elevation: 1.2 m (3.9 ft)

Population (2021)
  - Total: 1,985
  - Density: 55.79/km^{2} (144.5/sq mi)
- Time zone: UTC+1 (CET)
  - Summer (DST): UTC+2 (CEST)
- Postal code: 9965
- Dialing code: 0595

Leens (Dutch pronunciation: [leːns]; Gronings: Lains [ɫɑɪns]) is a village in the Dutch province of Groningen. It is located in the municipality of Het Hogeland. Leens was a separate municipality until 1990, when it was merged with Ulrum, Eenrum and Kloosterburen.

== Brief history ==
Leens is located on old marsh land which have been inhabited since the Iron Age. Leens and Tuinsterwierde, which is situated slightly east of the village, lay on a mound, an artificial hill that prevented the town from flooding when the land wasn't yet protected by dikes. The draining of the marshes is largely due to the work of the Benedictine monks. From their monasteries they built dikes and drained the land.

The Leenster parish was probably founded in the 8th century by Saint Ludger. The oldest parts of the Petruskerk date from the 12th century.

In the 20th century Leens was connected to the Dutch rail network, but that was short lived. the Marnelijn opened in 1922 and closed in 1940, after which the rails were transported to the Eastern Front. The station building still stands.

== Notable people ==
Ailke Westerhof was nurse in the WW1 era. She died in the same house in which she had been born; the house in Leens is now a national monument, and the street has been renamed 'Westerhofstraat'.

== Gallery ==
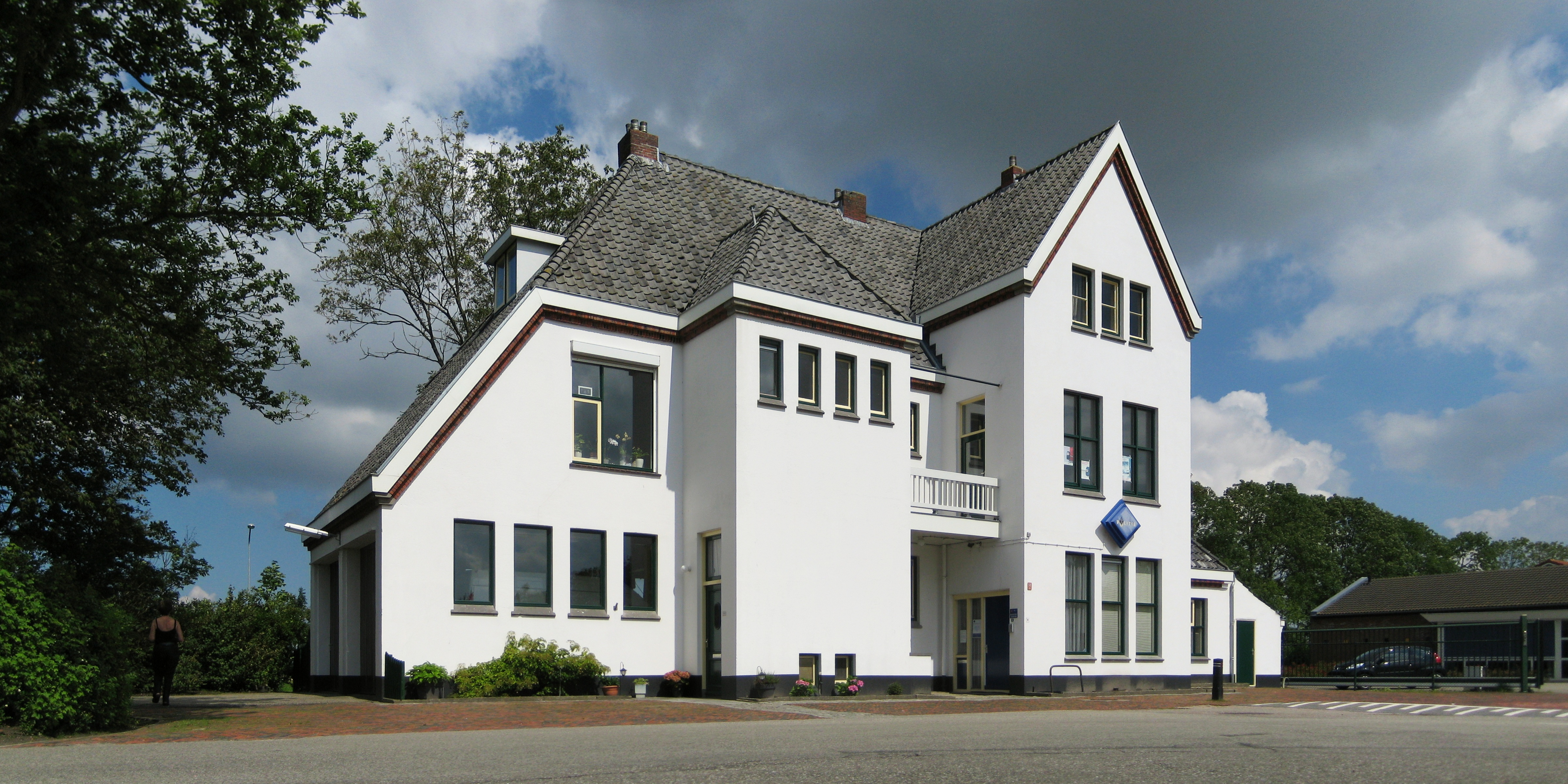
The former railway station

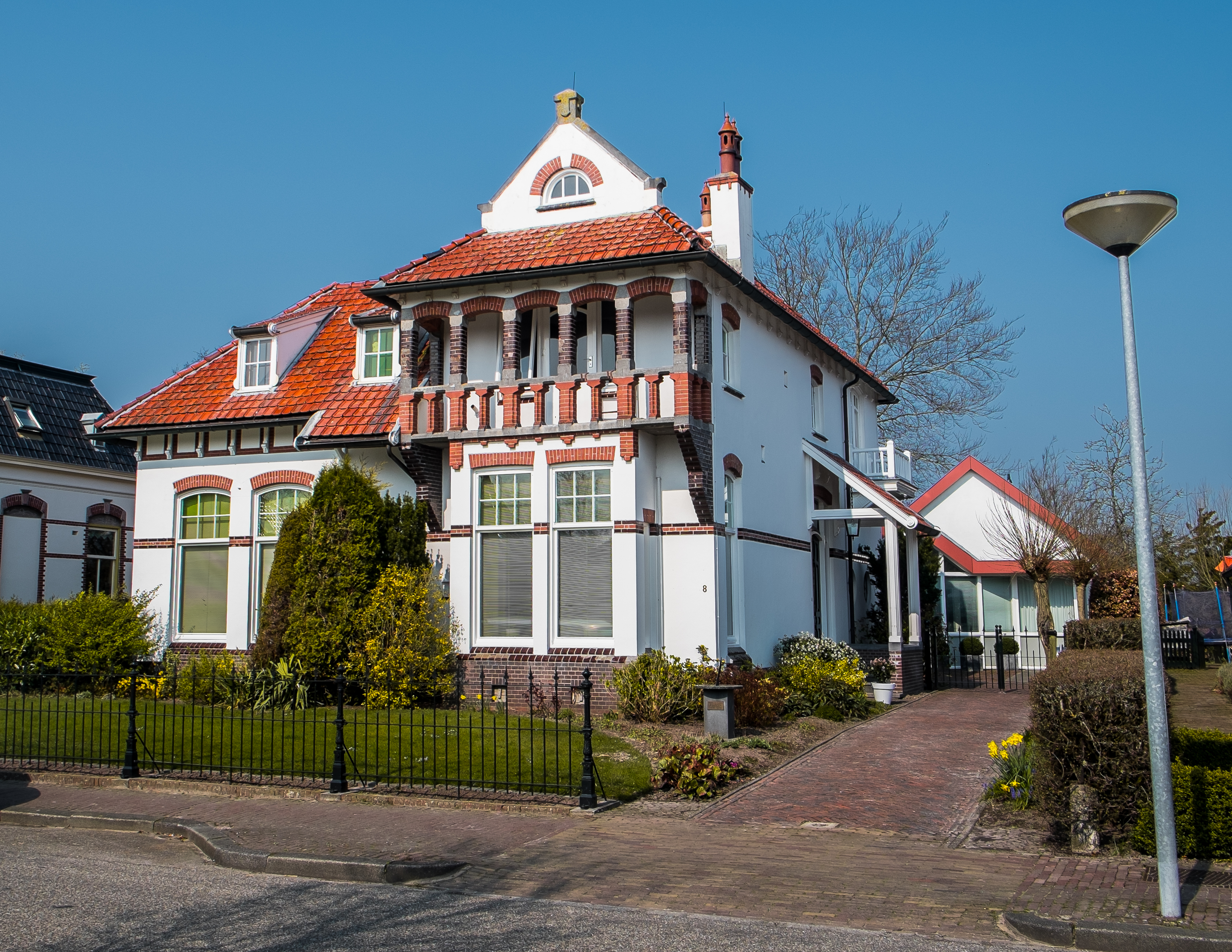
Villa in Leens

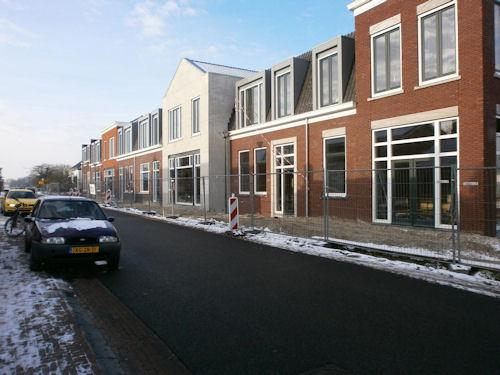
New houses in Leens

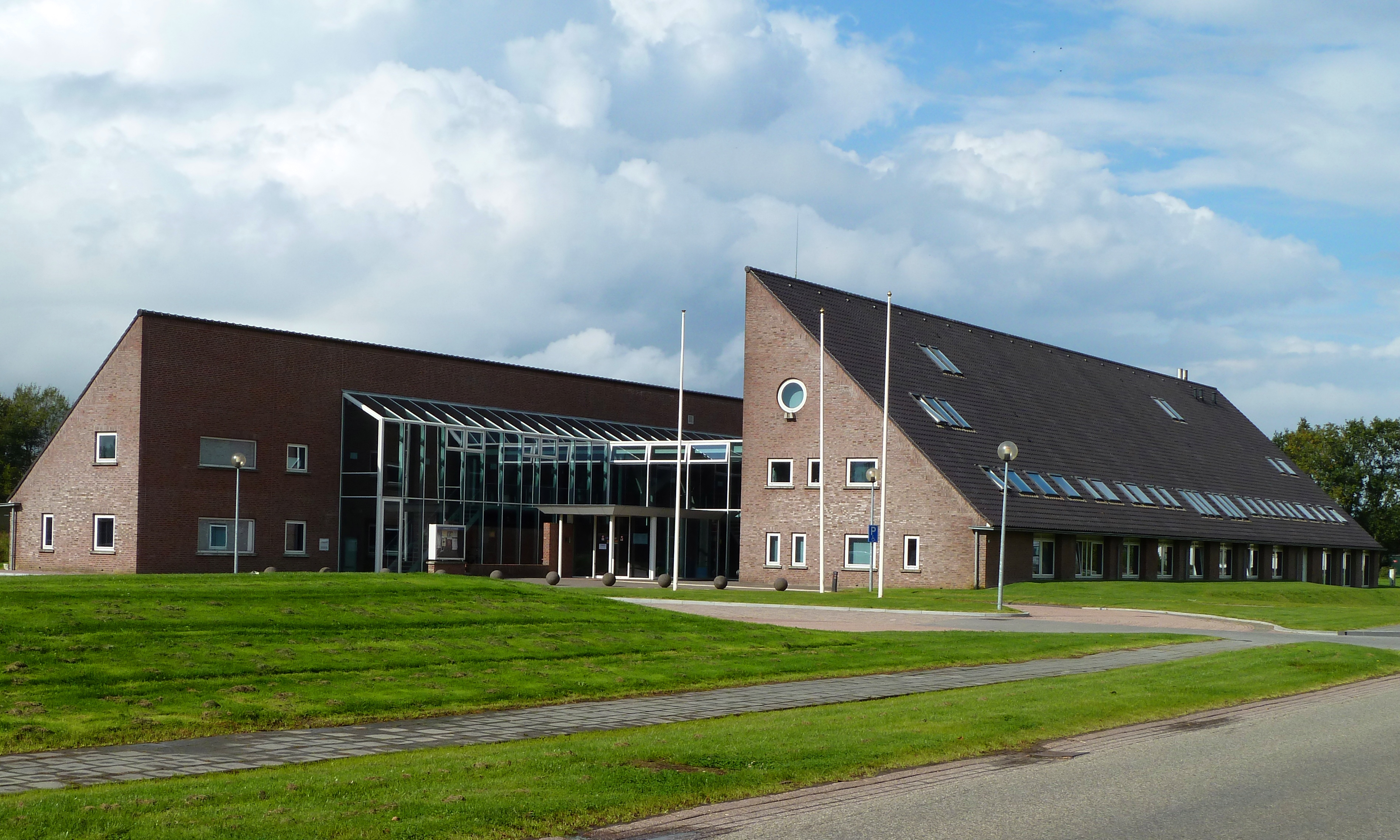
Former town hall
