= Ulrum =

- Village
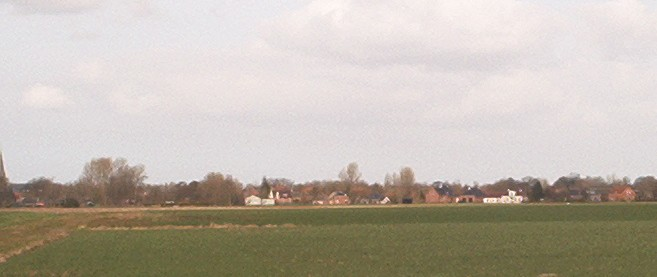
- Ulrum in c. 2006

- Flag Coat of arms

- Location of Ulrum in the province of Groningen
- Coordinates: 53°21.54′N 6°19.99′E
- Country: Netherlands
- Province: Groningen
- Municipality: Het Hogeland

Area
  - Total: 28.48 km^{2} (11.00 sq mi)
- Elevation: 3.4 m (11 ft)

Population (2021)
  - Total: 1,305
  - Density: 45.82/km^{2} (118.7/sq mi)
- Time zone: UTC+1 (CET)
  - Summer (DST): UTC+2 (CEST)
- Postal code: 9971
- Dialing code: 0596

Ulrum (Dutch pronunciation: [ˈʏlrʏm]; Gronings: Ollerom [ˈɔɫəɾɔm]) is a village in the Dutch province of Groningen. It is located in the municipality of Het Hogeland.

== History ==
The first time the town was named was as Uluringhem in the 11th century.

Ulrum is sited on two mounds. On the western one stands the Romano-Gothic church of Ulrum (built at the end of the 12th century), on the eastern mound stood the Asingaborg.

Ulrum was once a thriving village with many tradesmen and small businesses. Now only agricultural activity remains.

Ulrum was a separate municipality until 1990, when it merged with Eenrum, Kloosterburen, and Leens. The new municipality was called Ulrum at first, but was renamed to De Marne in 1992.

== Gallery ==
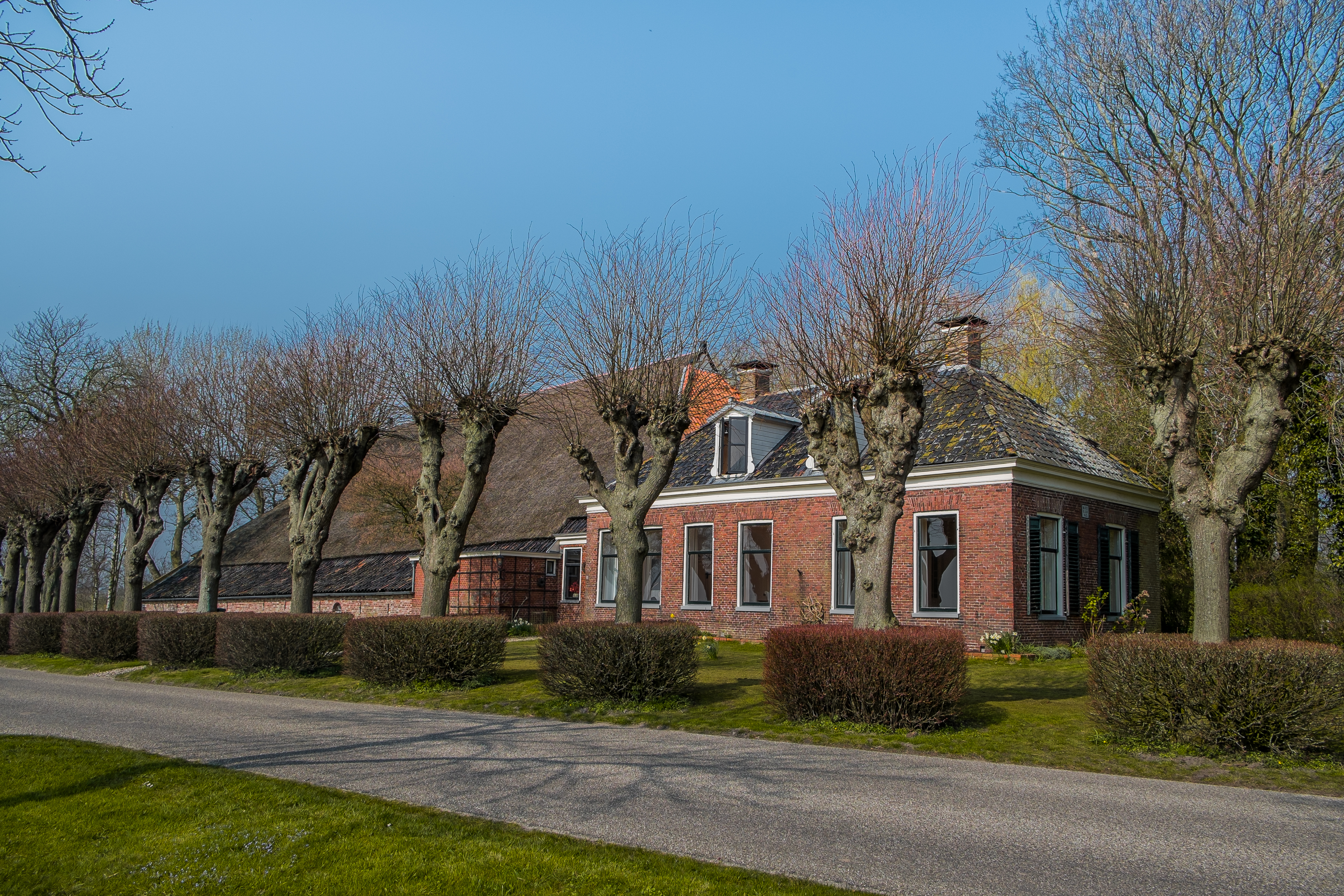
Farm in Ulrum

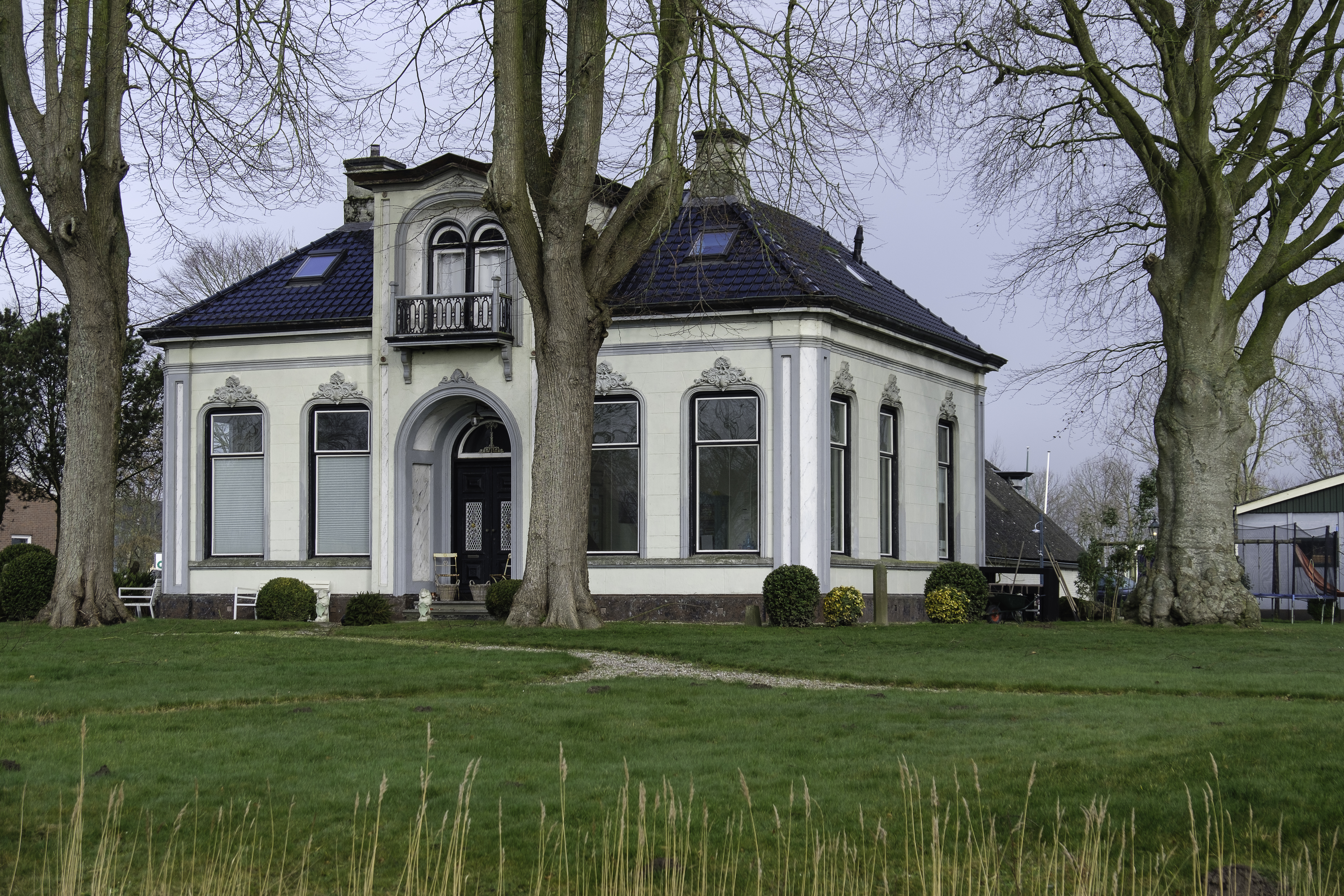
House in Ulrum

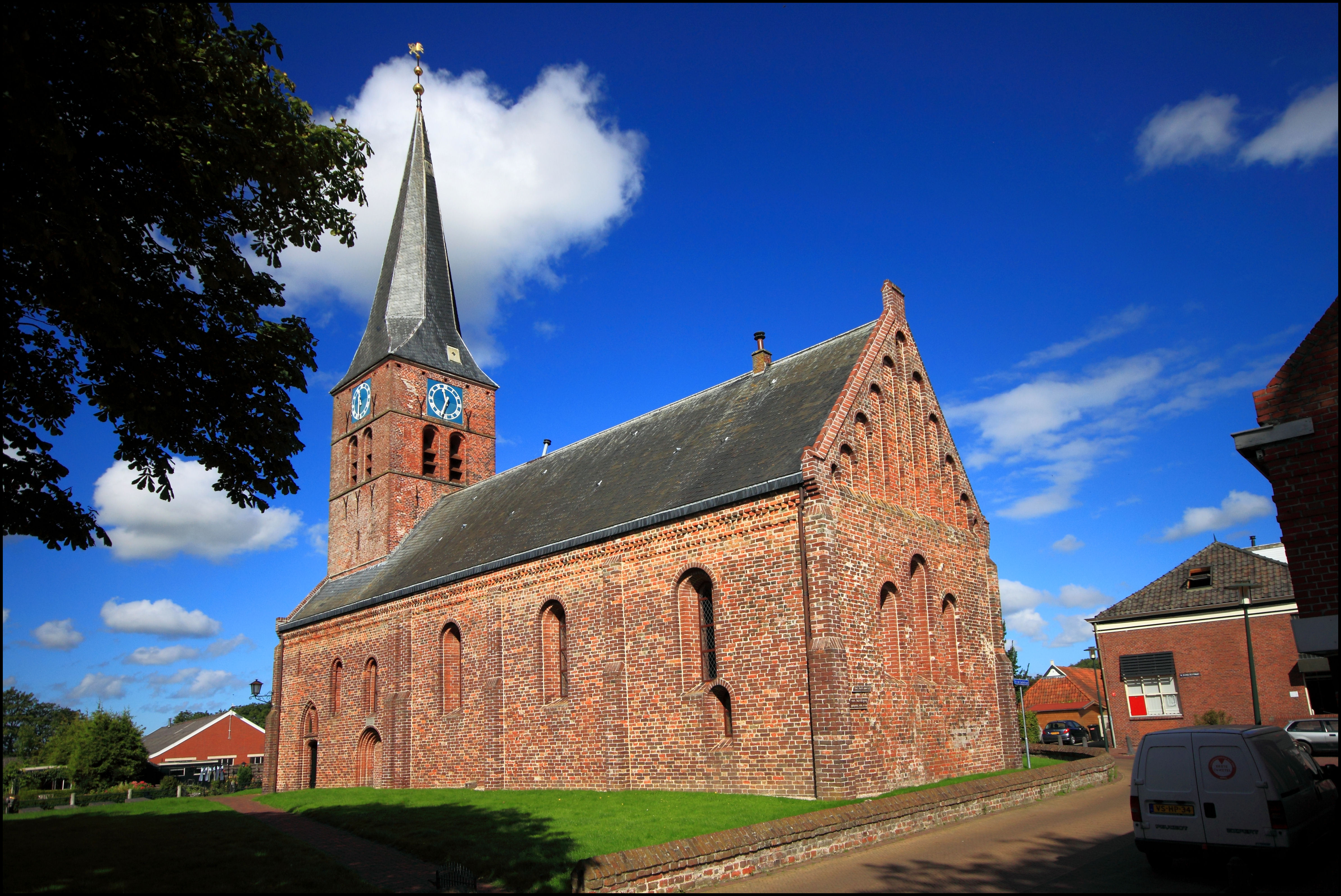
Protestant Church in Ulrum

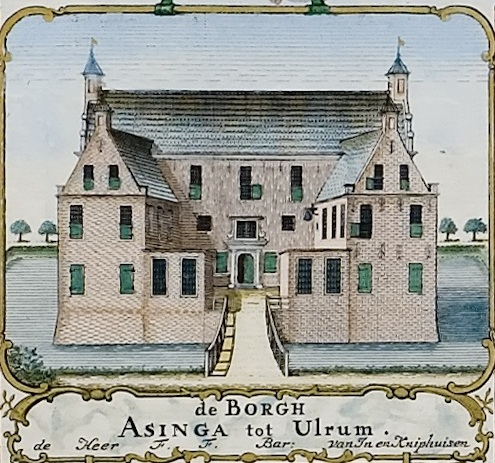
Borg Asinga
