= List of directors of Teylers Stichting =

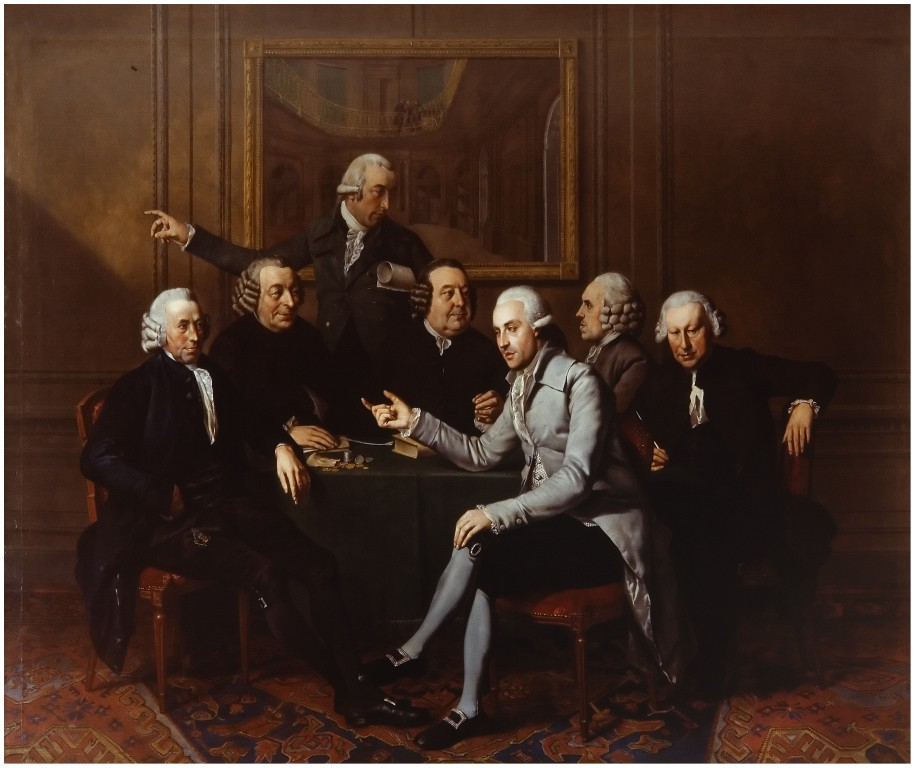
The Board of Teylers Foundation in 1786, with Leendert Viervant (standing in the back), the architect of Teylers Hofje, by Wybrand Hendriks. Sitting from left to right: Willem van der Vlugt Sr., Antoni Kuits, Gerard Hugaart, Adriaan van Zeebergh, Jan Herdingh, and secretary Koenraad Hovens.

This list contains a list of the directors of Teylers Stichting (Teylers Foundation) - there are five directors at the Foundation, which together make up the Board. Appointments were for life, although directors can resign. The years indicate their membership.

== Original appointed directors ==
The directors appointed in the testament of Pieter Teyler van der Hulst:

- Jacobus Barnaart (1778 - 1780)
- Isaac Brand (1778 - 1782)
- Gerard Hugaart (1778 - 1791)
- Antoni Kuits (1778 - 1789)
- Willem van der Vlugt Sr. (1778 - 1807)

== Co-opted directors ==
Replacements were added by cooptation.

- Adriaan van Zeebergh (1780 - 1824)
- Jan Herdingh (1782 - 1822)
- Bartel Willem van der Vlugt (1789 - 1839)
- Abraham Hugaart Heems (1791 - 1827)
- Koenraad Hovens (1807 - 1817)
- Willem van der Vlugt (1817 - 1849)
- Vincent Loosjes (1822 - 1841)
- Laurens van Oukerke (1824 - 1835)
- Sybren Klazes Sybrandi (1827 - 1854)
- Vincent van der Vlugt (1835 - 1867)
- Willem van Walré (1839 - 1872)
- Vincent Pzn Herdingh (1841 - 1858)
- Laurens van Hulst (1850 - 1851), resigned
- Jan van der Vlugt (1851 - 1889)
- Carel Godfried Voorhelm Schneevoogt (1854 - 1877)
- Klaas Sybrandi (1858 - 1872)
- Alexander Herdingh (1867 - 1906)
- Willem van Oorde (1872 - 1888)
- Louis Paul Zocher (1872 - 1915)
- Pieter Loosjes (1877 - 1910)
- Daniel de Haan (1889 - 1895)
- Anthonie Wilhelm Thöne (1889 - 1921)
- Jacobus Johannes van Oorde (1895 - 1924), resigned
- Jan Adriaan Fontein (1906 - 1941)
- Pieter Dozy (1910 - 1918), resigned
- Vincent Loosjes II (1915 - 1931)
- Wopco Cnoop Koopmans (1918 - 1946)
- Jan Cornelis Tadema (1921 - 1961)
- Carsten Wilhelm Thöne (1924 - 1969), resigned
- Jan Willem van der Vlugt (1931 - 1963)
- Addick Adrianus Gosling Land (1941 - 1949)
- Theodoor August Wesstra (1946 - 1969)
- René Fontein (1949 - 1963), resigned
- Pieter Jacob Zondervan (1961 - 1973), resigned
- Hendrik Eliza Stenfert Kroese (1963 - 1984)
- Cornelis Wilhelmus Derk Vrijland (1963 - ?)
- Leo van Nouhuys (1969 - ?)
- Gerhard Beets (1970 - ?)
- Lodewijk Herbert Schimmelpenninck (1973 - ?)

== Sources ==
- Teyler 1778-1978:studies en bijdragen over Teylers Stichting naar aanleiding van het tweede eeuwfeest, by J. H. van Borssum Buisman, H. Enno van Gelder, Pieter Teyler van der Hulst, Schuyt, 1978, ISBN 90-6097-091-8
