= Portrait of Dorothea Berck =

Painting by Frans Hals

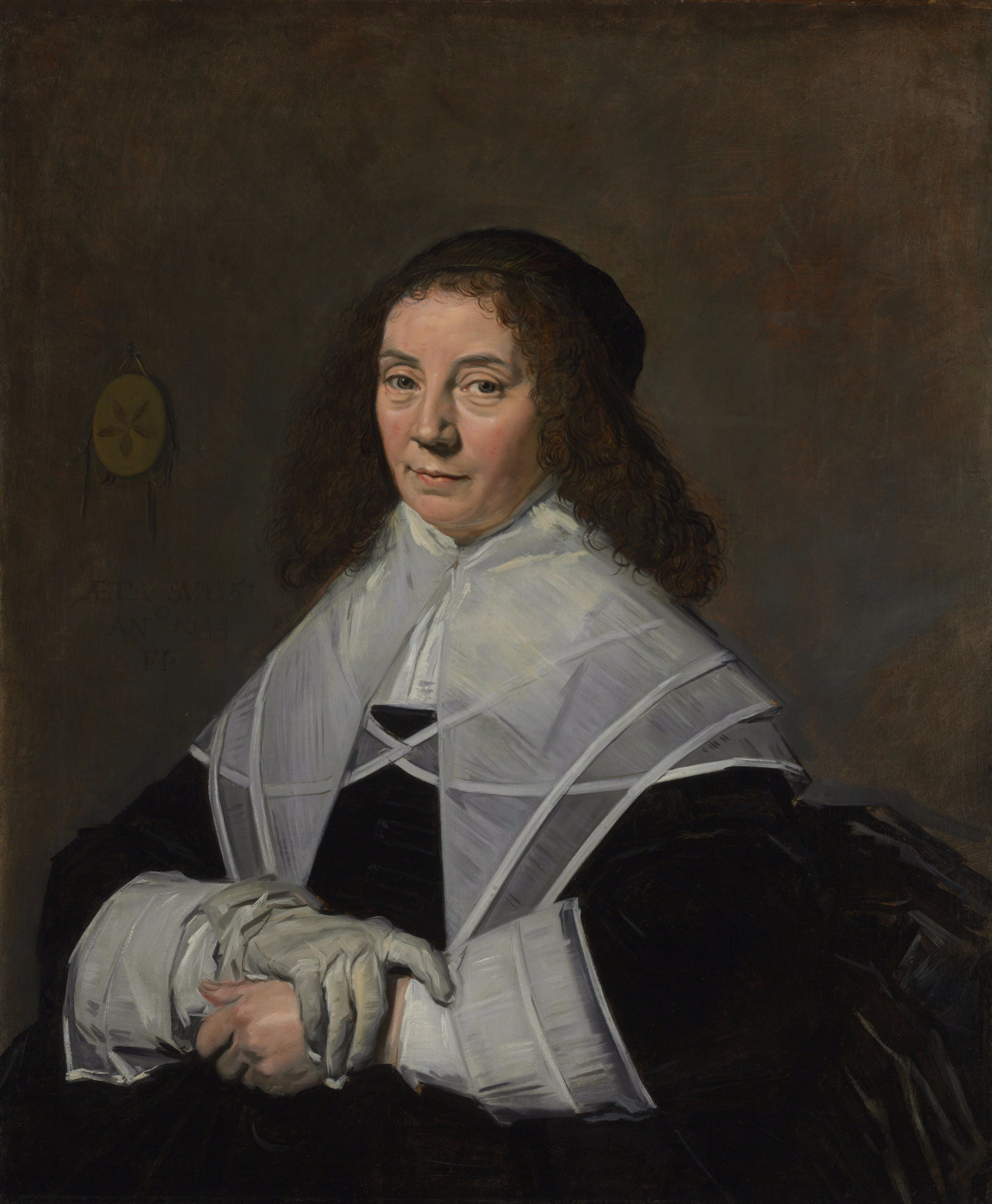
- Inscribed "SVAE 51/Ano 1644/FH"
- Artist: Frans Hals
- Year: 1644
- Medium: Oil on canvas
- Dimensions: 79.7 cm × 65.0 cm (33 in × 27.4 in)
- Location: Baltimore Museum of Art; Baltimore
- Accession: 1938.231
- Website: www.artbma.org/interact/pachyderm/halsbma

Portrait of Dorothea Berck is a 1644 painting by Frans Hals that is in the collection of the Baltimore Museum of Art. It depicts Dorothea Berck at age 51, the wife of the prosperous Haarlem merchant Joseph Coymans, whose portrait Hals also painted. Both paintings were executed on the occasion of their daughter Isabella's wedding, whose marriage pendants Hals also painted.

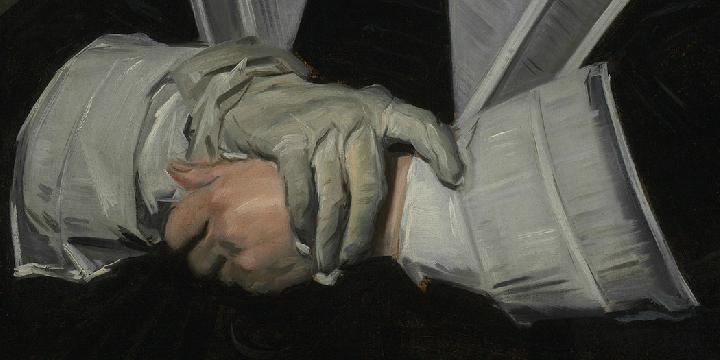
Detail of her hands

The painting, like many of Hals's portraits, is inscribed and signed, but there is no mention of the identity of the sitter, and it was only identified as Berck in 1908. The portrait is noted for its classical similarity to the Mona Lisa. Like the Mona Lisa, she sits upright in a dark chair and rests her hands on either a dark desk or perhaps a large dress that surrounds her. Her ungloved hand may be clasping a book or part of her sleeve. The loose brushwork is typical of Hals and shows a fleeting gesture with the casual way her finger is hooked over her wrist. Portraits of subjects with one glove on and one glove off are common in Dutch 17th-century marriage pendant portraits. Gloves symbolize the wedding vows where the husband and wife each hold one of a pair of gloves. In this case, her husband Joseph Coymans is wearing the "other glove" in his pendant portrait. In Hals' marriage pendant portraits, the husband is always situated on the left and the woman on the right, and the light always comes from the left, shining fully on the woman.

In 1639 the portrait of Baldassare Castiglione by Raphael was auctioned in Amsterdam and caused a sensation, making this posture popular at that time among the sitters for portraits in the Netherlands. Hals is sure to have seen the Castiglione portrait, but it is not certain he was familiar with the Mona Lisa, though works by renaissance masters such as Titian were actively collected and studied throughout the Netherlands and neo-classicism was on the rise at that time.

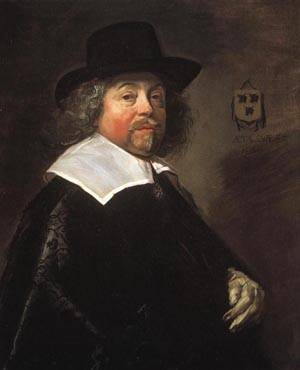
Pendant portrait of Joseph Coymans

Portrait of Baldassare Castiglione by Raphael

Mona Lisa, by Leonardo da Vinci

Dorothea Berck is also known in Haarlem as a hofje founder. She purchased the hofje now known as the Vrouwe- en Antonie Gasthuys in 1655 and gave it the name of "Coymans Hofje". It is unknown why the hofje was later resold to Kolder.

== See also ==
- List of paintings by Frans Hals
