= Vincent Loosjes =

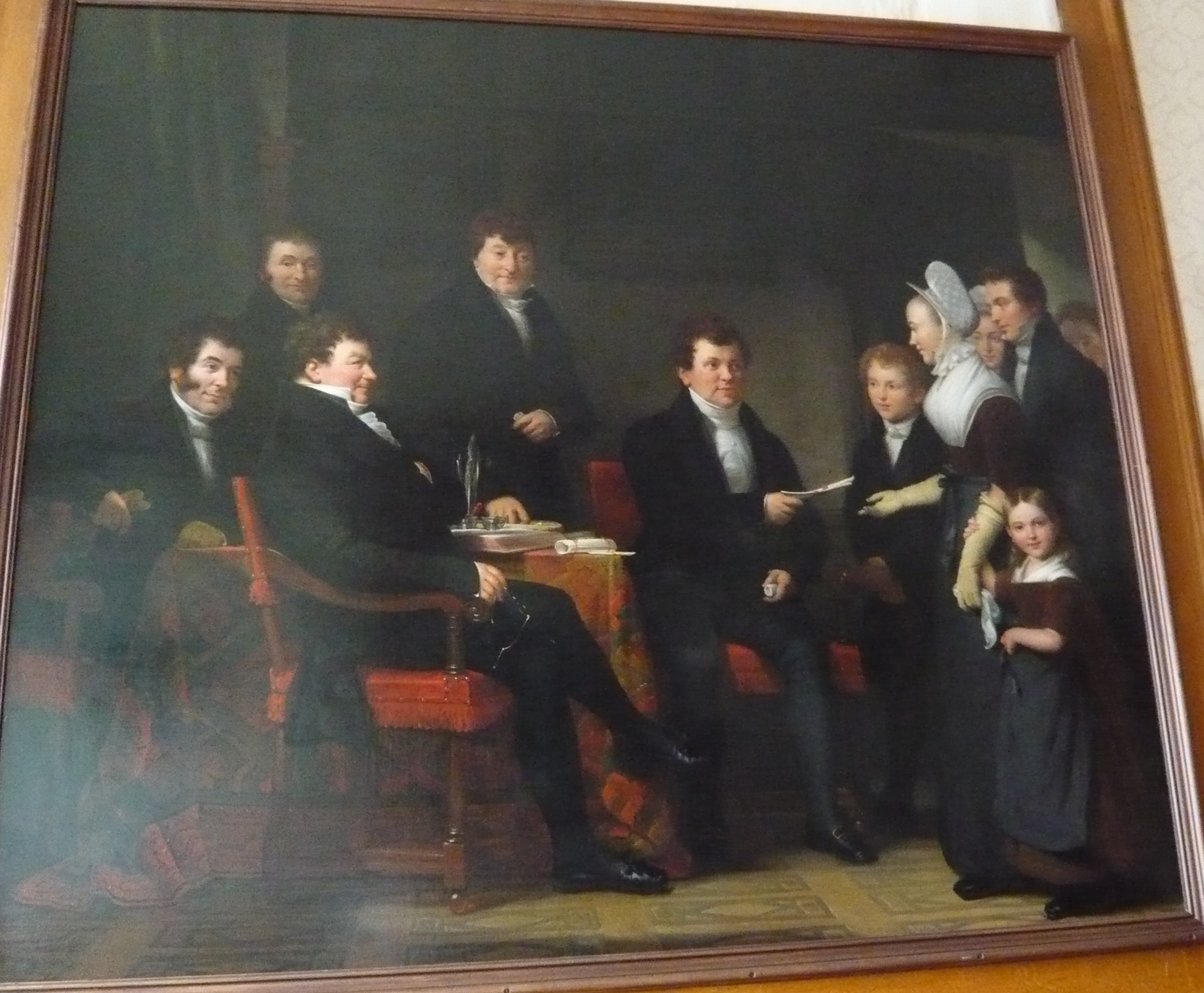
Regents of the Doopsgezinde Weeshuis, Haarlem, by Jan Adam Kruseman, 1834. Vincent Loosjes is handing a paper to Maria de Koning.

Vincent Loosjes (1787, Haarlem – 3 April 1841, Haarlem), was a 19th-century writer and publisher from the Netherlands.

== Biography ==
He was the son of Adriaan Loosjes, a prolific writer who started a publishing company in Haarlem. He translated several books from English into Dutch.

In 1833 he was chairman of the regents of the Mennonite orphanage in Haarlem that was celebrating its bicentennial. He commissioned a painting by Jan Adam Kruseman which featured the regents as well as a few orphans. He had succeeded his father in that function, who died in 1818. Loosjes also took his father's place working for Teylers Stichting. He also was a member of the Haarlem societies Oefening in Wetenschappen, the chamber of rhetoric Wijngaardranken, and Demokriet. His publishing company was continued by his son Adriaan Loosjes III.
