= Vrouwe- en Antonie Gasthuys =

Hofje on the Klein Heiligland 64a in Haarlem, Netherlands

Coordinates: 52°22′37.7″N 4°37′56.2″E

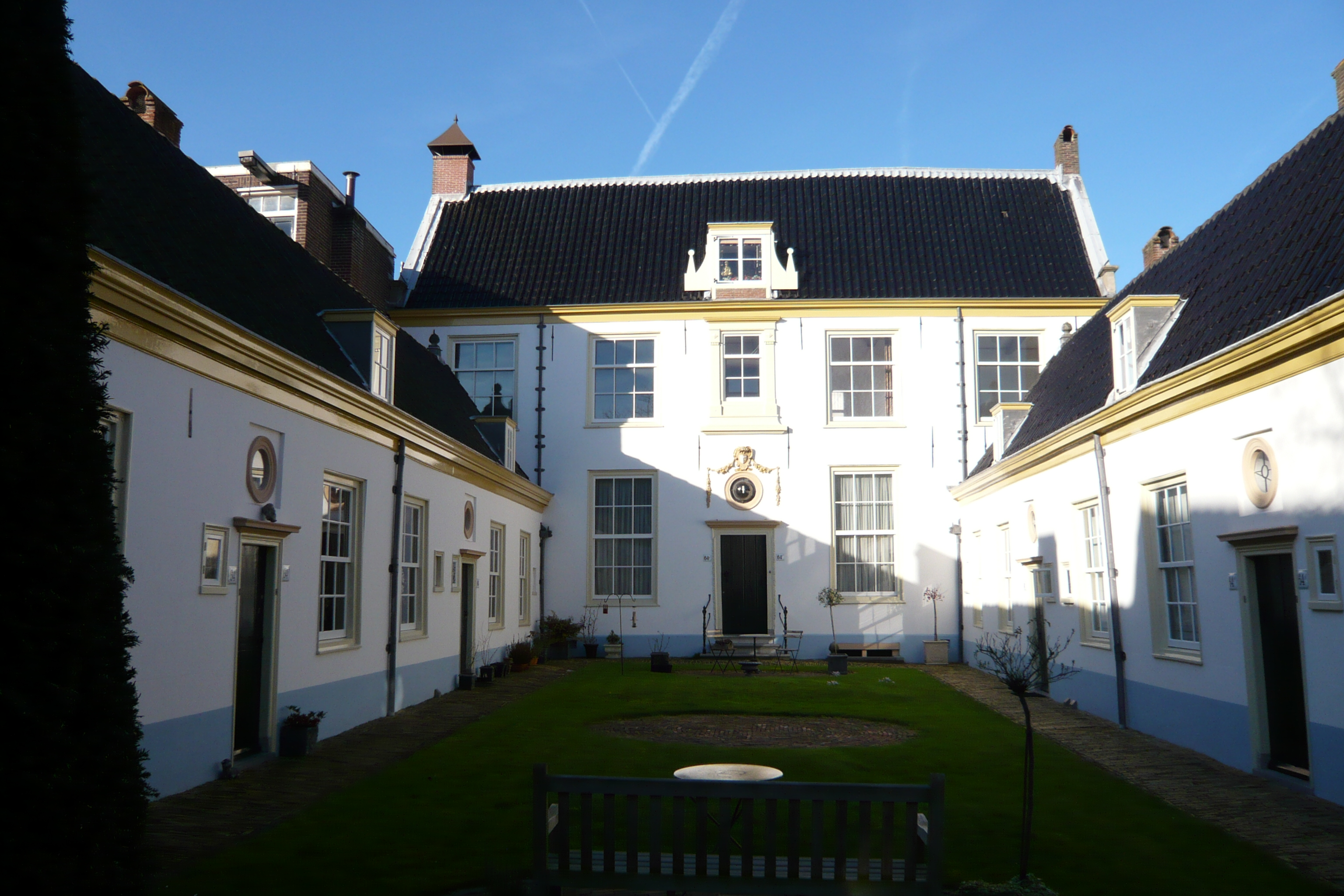
The Vrouwe- en Antonie Gasthuis on the Klein Heiligland, was founded as a shelter for pilgrims.

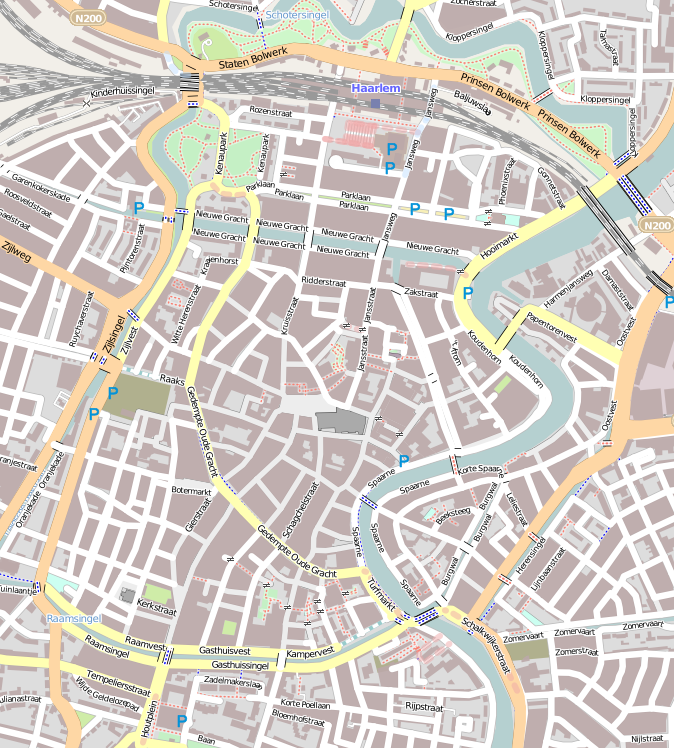
The Teylers Hofje and the Teylers Museum overlook the Spaarne river, and the Vrouwe- en Antonie Gasthuys is on the Klein Heiligland.

The Vrouwe- en Antonie Gasthuis is a hofje on the Klein Heiligland 64a in Haarlem, Netherlands. It is open on weekdays from 10-17.00.

== History of the Foundation ==
This hofje is run by a charitable foundation called 'Vrouwe- en Antonie Gasthuis', which was founded in 1726 as a merger from two Haarlem Christian foundations dating back to 1440. One was for women in need of shelter called the Onze Lieve Vrouwegasthuys op Bakenes (Blessed Virgin Almshouse in Bakenes), founded on February 14 (St. Valentine's Day) by Claes Brensoenzoon and under the management of the Bakenesserkerk. The term "op Bakenes" was to differentiate this foundation from the Onze Lieve Vrouwegasthuys located in the Jansstraat that been founded by Hugo van Assendelft in 1435 (today known as the St. Barbaragasthuis). The other one was for both women and men called the St. Anthoniegasthuys, founded on July 1 (O.L. Vrouwen visitatie) by Jan Claes Dierdtssen under the management of the brothers of St. Anthony (also referred to as the "Heilige Kruisgilde" or Holy Cross guild) on the Hagestraat. These two Gasthuysen operated independently as common "shelters for christians" until after the Protestant Reformation, when all church property reverted to the Haarlem city council in 1581. The two foundations then split off from their church-related management and continued to operate as hofjes independently of each other until they were finally merged as one foundation in 1726.

=== Earlier locations ===
The "OLV" foundation was originally located in the Klerksteeg at the corner of Voochtensteeg (which ran south of the Bakenesserkerk and joined the Koudenhorn, somewhere near the location of the Teylers Hofje). The original location of the "St. Anthony" foundation was nearby on the east side of the Spaarne on the Hagestraat or 'High' road where the most pilgrims arrived who came to Haarlem to revere the relics in the Sint-Bavokerk there. The merged foundation moved to its present location in 1787. Pilgrim traffic by that time was reduced due to the number of European wars, but the main reason for moving was that the former gateway to the city on the Hagestraat was no longer used. Most traffic to the city arrived by trekschuit and the new location was next to a boat landing. The foundation bought the current location from the Teylers Foundation, which managed a hofje there that Pieter Teyler van der Hulst founded in 1729. That hofje and its inhabitants moved in that year to the new premises at a much more prestigious location on the Spaarne river. Perhaps the foundation could not afford to rebuild and arranged to switch premises with the Teylers Stichting, who built their new hofje on what was previously land owned by the "OLV" foundation.

== History of the complex ==
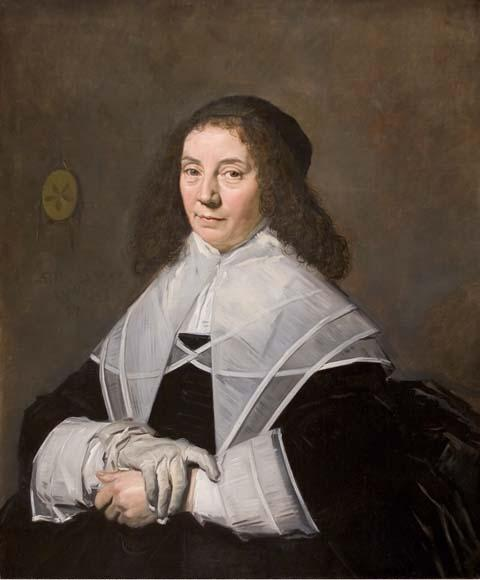
Former hofje owner Dorothea Berck, painted by Frans Hals in 1644 as a pendant to the wedding portrait of her husband Joseph Coymans

Today the entire complex is protected by the Rijksdienst voor het Cultureel Erfgoed (RCE) as a rijksmonument. The central building is the oldest part and dates from 1648, when it was called the Bogaert hofje, after a wealthy Haarlem Mennonite soapmaker called Pieter Joosten Bogaert, who owned a large house on the Grote Houtstraat facing another pensioner's home on the opposite side of the street, the Proveniershuis. After Bogaert's death, pensioner's rooms (Dutch: cameren) were built of wood along the edges of his back garden with their own side entrance onto a southern connecting alley Franekersteeg (that no longer exists) between the Klein Heiligland and the Grote Houtstraat. At that time the regents and the pensioners who needed care were housed in the main house which was built back to back with another building facing the shopping street. When the Bogaert foundation ran out of funds, it passed within the Mennonite community known as The Block, to another Mennonite, the widow Dorothea Berck, who bought it to memorialize her late husband, Josephus Coymans in 1655. Then it passed to the silk merchant Jan Kolder, before being sold to silk merchant Pieter Teyler van der Hulst in 1729, who bought it to memorialize his wife after his marriage in the same year. He made the first serious changes to the complex. He added the stone side wings for pensioners in 1730, improving their living conditions, and created the main entrance on the Klein Heiligland. By that time, the older Bogaert home on the Grote Houtstraat had changed hands (today from the Grote Houtstraat nothing can be seen of the hofje).

== Teylers Stichting ==
After Teyler's death it passed to the Teylers Stichting who carried the tradition on in the name of Pieter Teyler, not his wife. They later made the deal with the Vrouwe- en Antonie Gasthuis foundation, when they had a new, modern hofje built for their pensioners on the Spaarne. The first regent of this new Vrouwe- en Antonie Gasthuys after their move was the Teylers art curator Wybrand Hendricks.
