= Jacobus Barnaart =

Dutch businessman

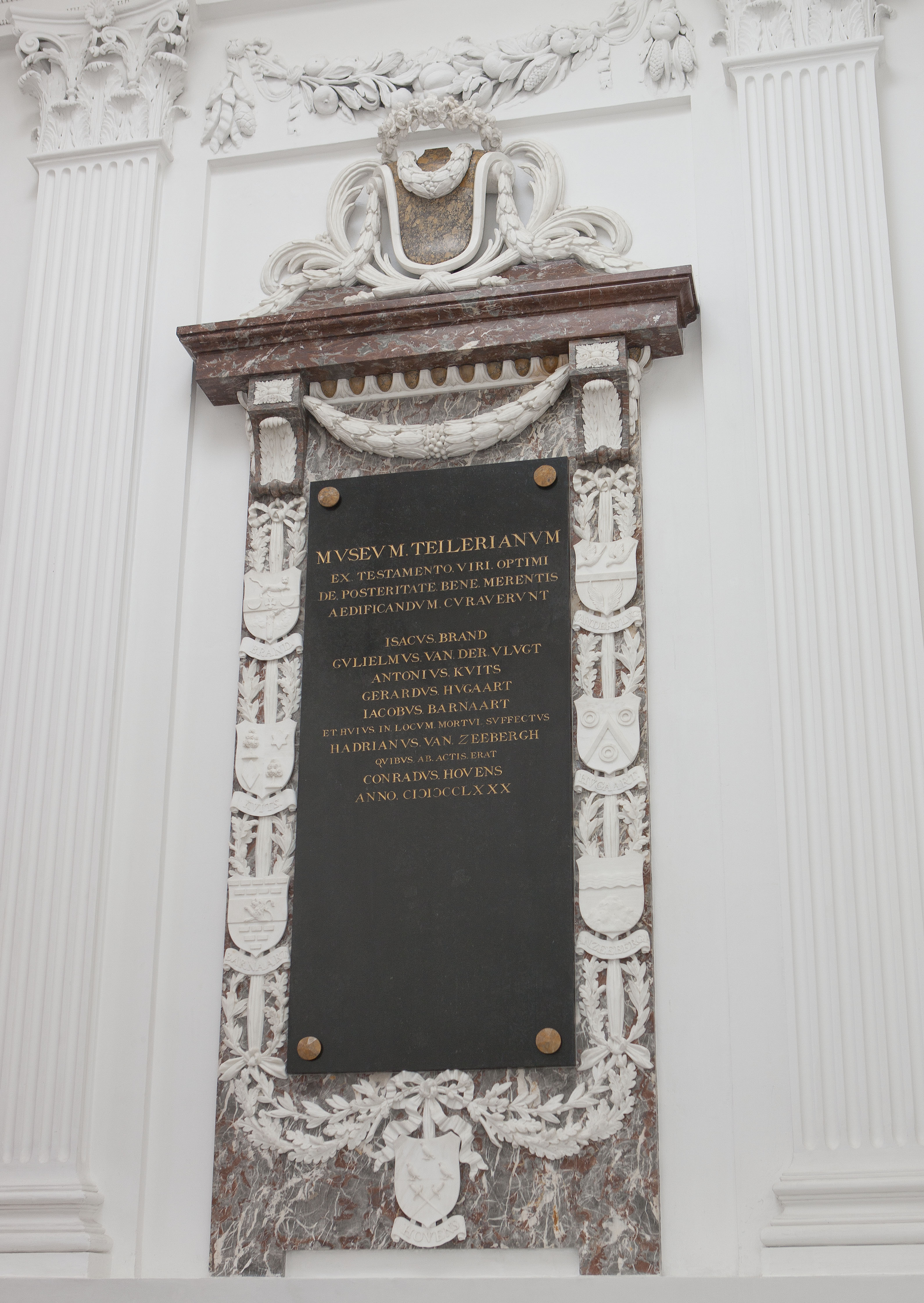
Barnaart's name is on the memorial to the first directors of Teylers Museum, in the staircase leading from the Oval room.

Jacobus Barnaart (6 October 1726 in Haarlem - 2 November 1780 in Haarlem) was a Dutch merchant and one of the five first directors of the Teylers Stichting.

Barnaart, son of Jacobus Barnaart and Margaretha van Elten, was born in a relatively rich Baptist family. His father was a merchant, silk cloth manufacturer, and regent of the local orphanage. He could afford to send his son to the Latin school (1738) and the Academy (1744). Following in the footsteps of his father, the younger Barnaart became a merchant, but also showed an interest in astronomical measurements. In 1756 he was appointed as future director of the Teylers Stichting, which was finally founded at the death of Pieter Teyler van der Hulst in 1778. After founding the Stichting (Foundation) he became one of the five directors responsible for the Teylers Museum and the Teylers societies.

Barnaart's interest in astronomy led to his setting up an astronomical observatory on top of the Oval Room, although he was advised by Martinus van Marum that this would not be a practical place due to vibrations, which could lead to inexact measurements. The Teylers astronomical observatory was constructed on top of the Oval Room, but in a smaller version than initially planned.

Diaries of Barnaart have been preserved, describing his experiences from age 11 onward, which includes some of his astronomical observations.
