= Joseph Coymans =

Dutch businessman

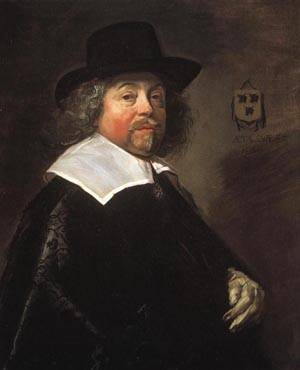
Portrait of Joseph Coymans

Joseph Coymans (1591 – ca 1653), was a Dutch businessman in Haarlem, known best today for his portrait painted by Frans Hals, and its pendant, Portrait of Dorothea Berck. The former resides at the Wadsworth Atheneum in Hartford, the latter at the Baltimore Museum of Art. A portrait of the couple's son Willem is held by the National Gallery of Art in Washington, D.C.

== Biography ==
He was born in Hamburg as the son of Balthazar Coymans and Isabella de Picquere, and brother of Balthasar and Joan Coymans, wealthy businessmen in Amsterdam who commissioned a canal house there called the Coymanshuis, built by the Haarlem architect Jacob van Campen. He married Dorothea Berck in 1616, the daughter of a wealthy wine trader in Dordrecht. The couple had five children who each married various wealthy members of the Haarlem or Amsterdam regency: Balthasar, Wilhelmina, Aernout, Josephus the Younger, Erkenraad, and Isabella. In 1632 Joseph lived in Haarlem on the Smedestraat, where he rented the largest house in the street from Anna Vogel, the wealthy wife of the WIC businessman Aelbert Dirckz Bas. His neighbors there were the lawyer Paulus van Beresteyn and the notary Henrick van Gellinckhuysen. Coymans ran a business as a trader in the linen market and owned some bleacheries in Bloemendaal.

The Coymans' son Balthasar (named after his uncle) later lived in the Zijlstraat, and the widowed Dorothea moved in with them before she died in 1678, where the inventory of her possessions (1684) was conducted, including a long list of paintings.

== Coymans hofje ==
Dorothea purchased a hofje between the Grote Houtstraat and the Klein Heiligland in 1655 that was later purchased by Pieter Teyler for his Teylers Hofje.

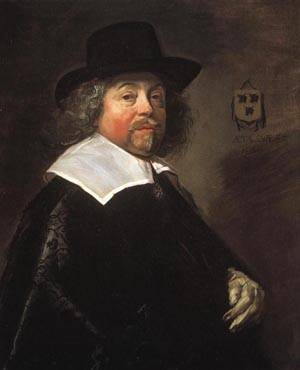
Joseph stands facing his wife with the light coming from the left

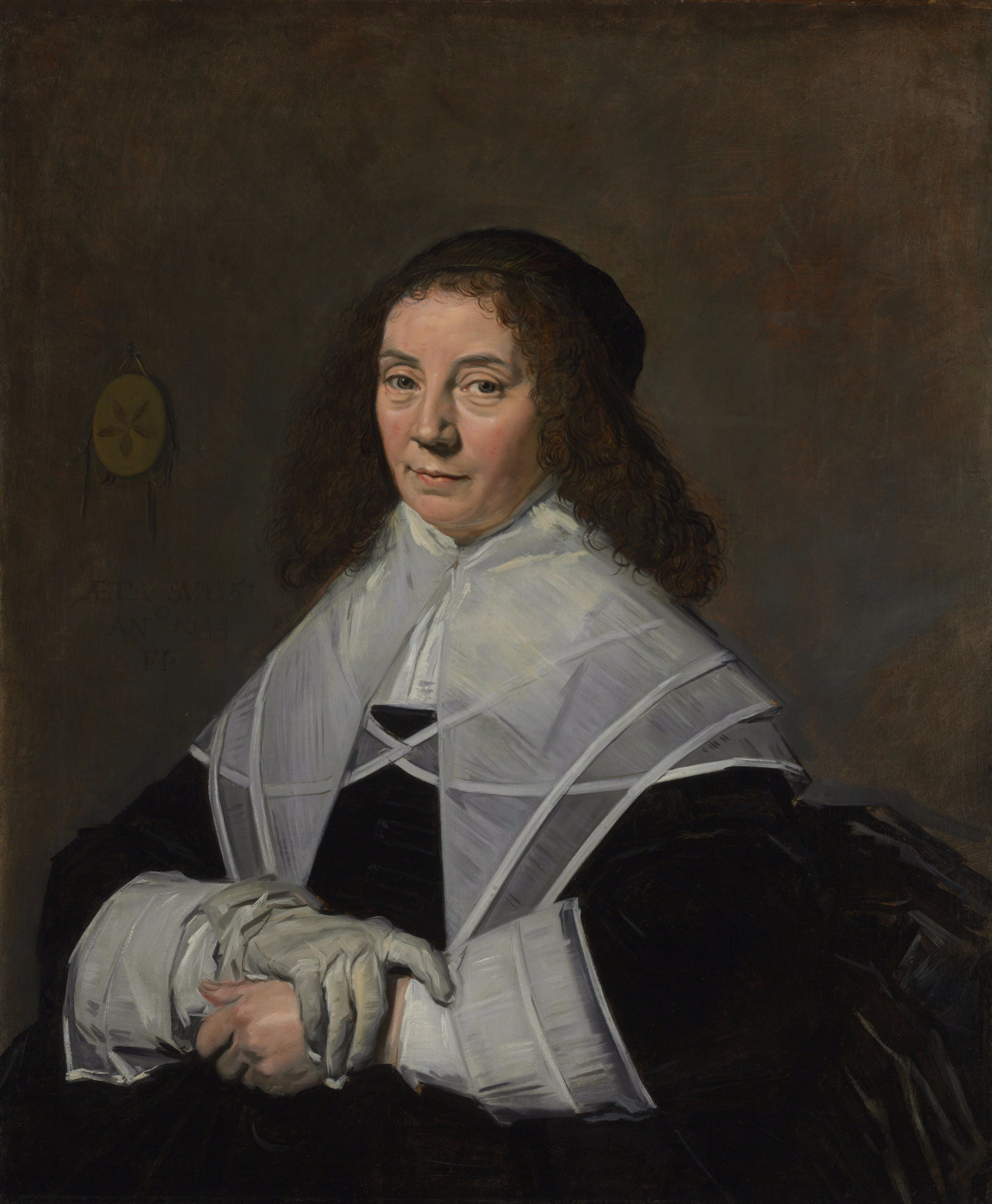
Dorothea faces her husband and the light

The pendant portraits of Joseph and Dorothea were painted by Frans Hals in 1644, when their daughter Isabella was married. He died in Haarlem.
