= Teylers Stichting =

Dutch organisation to promote research

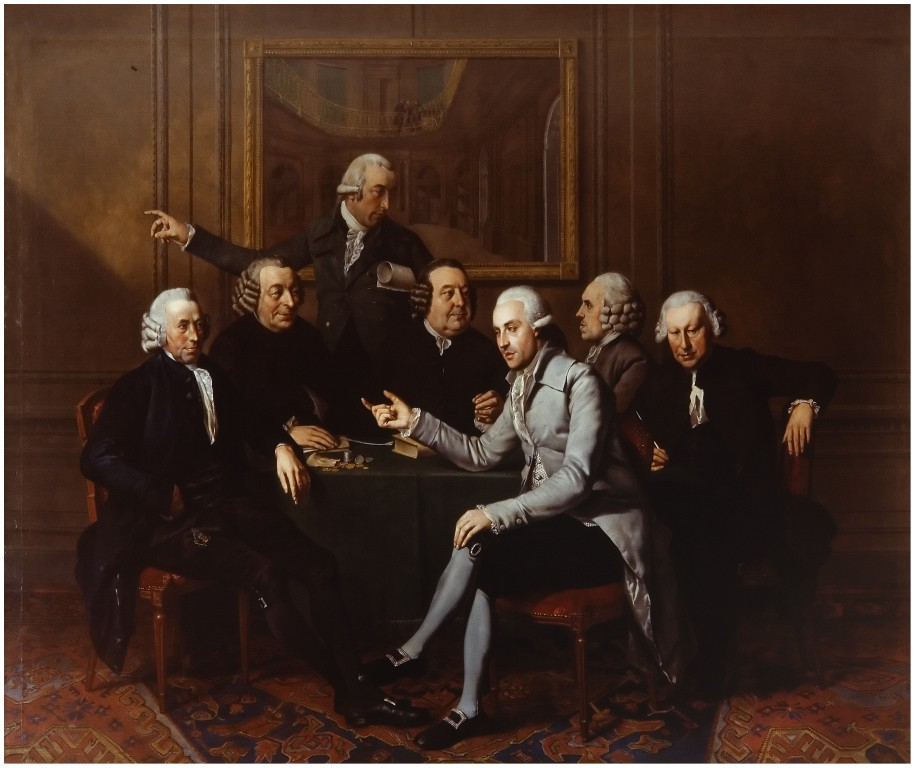
Wybrand Hendriks, Group portrait of the Board of Teylers Foundation, with their secretary and the architect Leendert Viervant, 1786, oil on canvas; 311 x 258 cm. In order of appearance are depicted: Willem van der Vlugt Sr., Antoni Kuits, Gerard Hugaart, Adriaan van Zeebergh, Jan Herdingh and Koenraad Hovens, secretary to the Board. The standing figure is the architect Leendert Viervant the Younger

The Teylers Stichting (English: Teylers Foundation) is a Dutch foundation founded with the heritage of the Dutch 18th century cloth merchant and banker Pieter Teyler van der Hulst to support the people in need and encourage worship, science, and art (ter ondersteuning van behoeftigen en ter aanmoediging van godsdienst, wetenschap).

== History ==
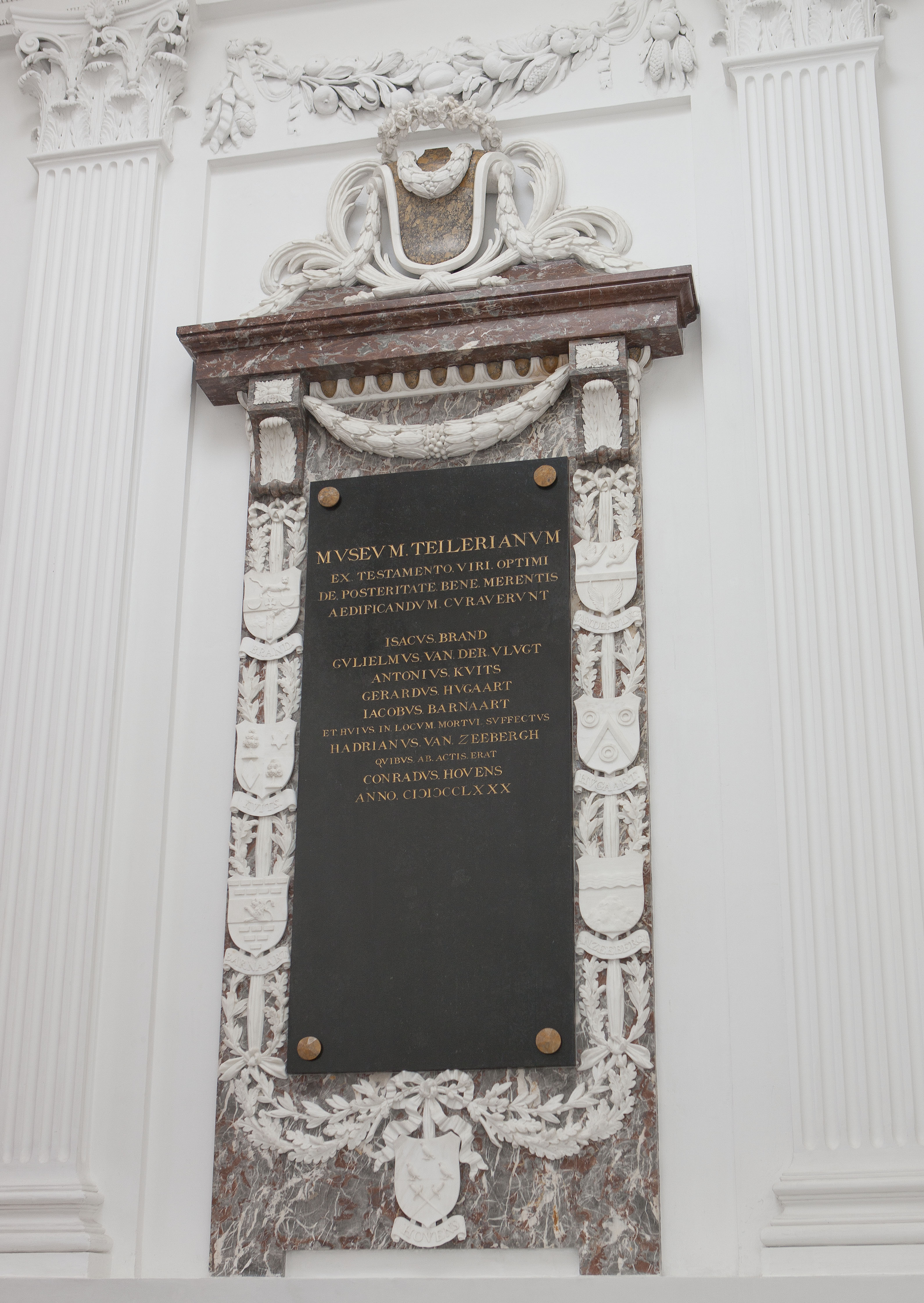
Memorial to the first Directors of Teylers Stichting in the Oval Room, 1784

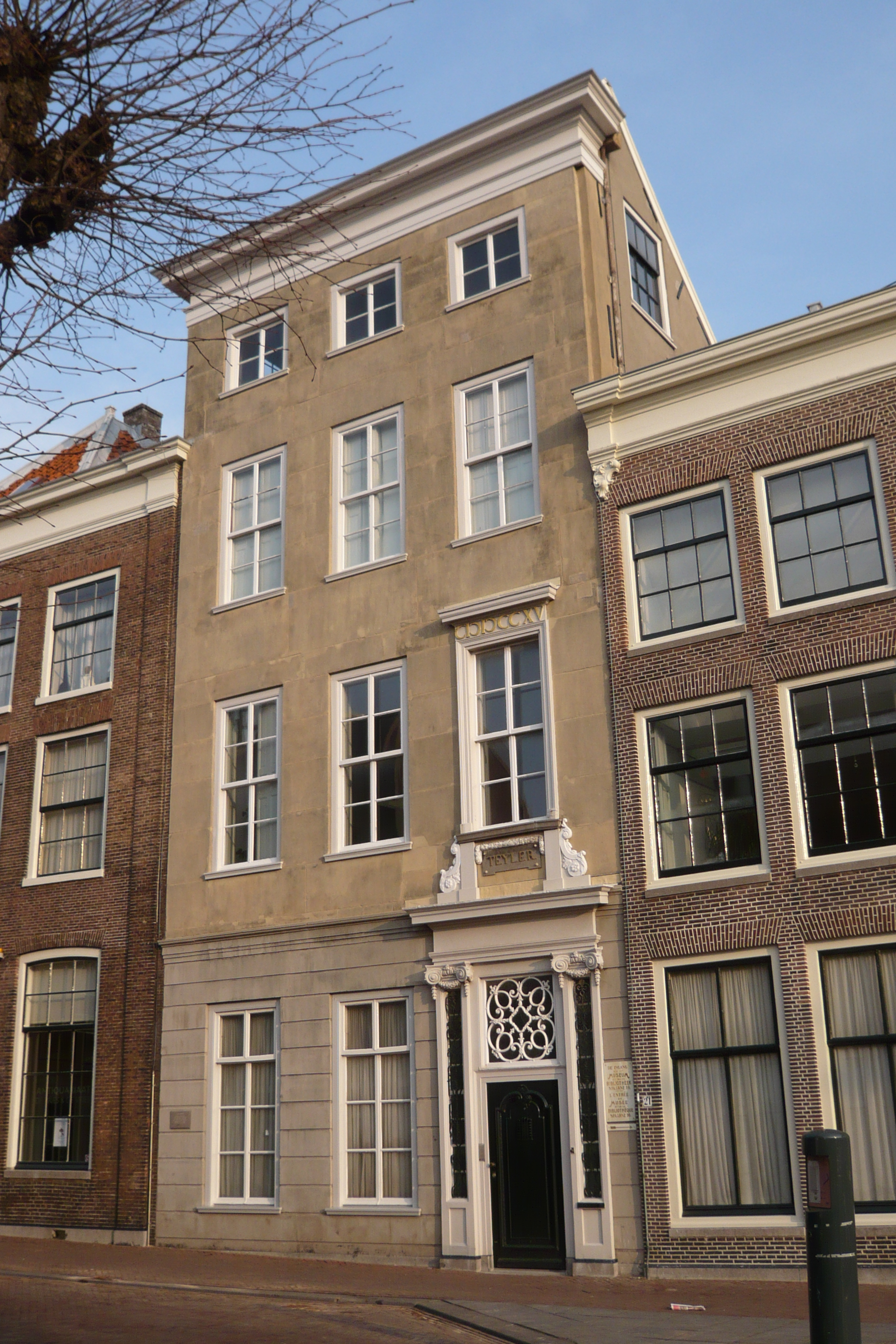
The Teylers Fundatiehuis (Foundation House), where the Teylers Stichting resides.

When Teyler deceased in 1778, he was without children or direct family, and specified in his testament how his money was to be spent. He left money for several individuals, the church and the general benefit as described above. Claims have been made by alleged family members that the testament was supposed to be limited in time to 100 years, after which the remaining money was to be transferred to the Teylers family. No such claims have been recognised in court.

The Stichting was founded by five friends of Teylers, who were his executors and the first directors.

The first replacing director (board member) of the Teylers Stichting was Adriaan van Zeebergh, the pensionary of the city of Haarlem, a powerful civil servant position at the time. He replaced Barnaart, who died in 1780.

== Governance and field of work ==
The foundation is governed by five directors, which are appointed via Co-option. The first directors were five of Teylers friends:

- Jacobus Barnaart (1778–1780) (In 1780 replaced by Adriaan van Zeebergh (1780–1824))
- Isaac Brand (1778–1782)
- Gerard Hugaart (1778–1791)
- Antoni Kuits (1778–1789)
- Willem van der Vlugt Sr. (1778–1807)

The directors traditionally meet in the "Grote Herenkamer" (Large Boardroom) at the Teylers Fundatiehuis (English: Foundation House), a room adjacent to the Oval Room of Teylers Museum. The current (2008) directors are:

- drs. J.R. Beets-Hehewerth
- mr. J.J. van Es
- mr. J.E. Trip, treasurer
- R.A.M. van Voorst van Beest-Gunst, secretary
- mr. C.G.A. van Wijk, presiding director

The Teylers Stichting was responsible for the Teylers Museum, the Teylers Hofje, and two societies: the Teylers Eerste Genootschap (Teylers First Society) which focuses on theological questions and the Teylers Tweede Genootschap (Teylers Second Society) which focuses on scientific questions. The Stichting is also responsible for the Teylers Chair at Leiden University. The actual management of the museum was left to a kastelein and later the museum director (not to confuse with the directors of the foundation).

In 1981 the governance of the Museum was transferred to a separate foundation on the request of the government, so that they could help fund it through subsidies after its recognition as museum of national importance. This separate foundation became the Stichting tot Beheer en Instandhouding van Teylers Museum (Foundation for management and conservation of Teylers Museum), and the Teylers Stichting still appoints two of the six members of the Supervisory Board of that foundation. The Teylers Stichting still does own the actual buildings.

As determined in the testament as well, the Stichting is established in the Fundatiehuis.

== Archive ==
The complete archive of the Teylers Stichting is still intact and available. The early years (1778–1827/28) in the archive have been digitized and are available online on the website of the Teylers Museum. This includes the minutes of the directors' meetings and the receipts of materials and museum pieces that were bought. From these receipts it can be reconstructed what the activities of the Teylers Stichting have been in the past.

The archive has been stored in a special room in the Fundatiehuis, as specified in the testament, which was provided with a special lock with five keyholes. Each of the directors would get one of the five different keys, and the lock was designed in such a way that it could not be opened or closed without at least three of the five keys - irrespective which.

== See also ==
- List of directors of Teylers Stichting
- Teylers Eerste Genootschap
- Teylers Tweede Genootschap
