= Isabella Coymans =

Dutch wife of Stephanus Geraerdts

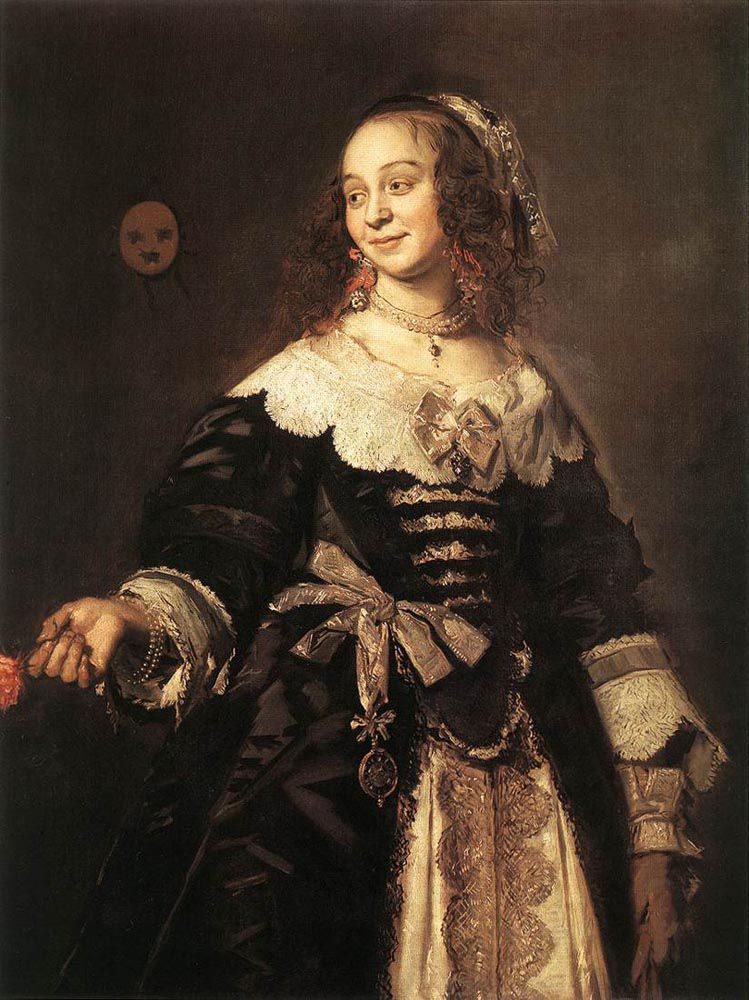
Portrait of Isabella Coymans

Isabella Coymans (1626 – 1689), was the Dutch wife of Stephanus Geraerdts best known for her portrait painted by Frans Hals.

== Biography ==
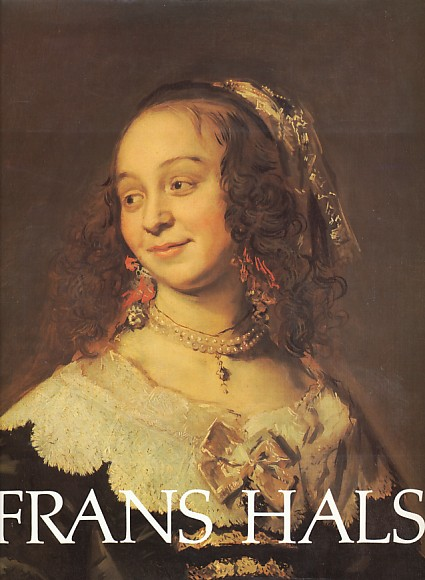
Cover of Seymour Slive catalog of Frans Hals paintings in 1989

She was the wealthy daughter of the Haarlem cloth merchant Joseph Coymans and Dorothea Berck. She chose as her husband Stephanus Geraerdts, who was a member of the Haarlem regency, and married him in 1644.

Frans Hals painted an unusual pair of wedding portraits for them, showing Isabella in an active state of presenting her husband with a rose, with only half of the rose showing in the painting. She is standing, and her husband is seated with his hand outstretched in a passive state of expectation. Though many pendant wedding portraits from the Dutch Golden Age have since been split up, this particular pair of portraits, that have been split up since 1886, receive the most commentary about this fact in the documentation. Hals certainly never gave any other woman so much action in a portrait painting. Her hair is also loose on her shoulders, and she is wearing a décolletage, though modest. Most of Hals's female sitters were buttoned up to the chin or wearing a box collar, and had their hair behind a Dutch ladies' diadem or cap.

Her portrait featured on the cover of Seymour Slive's Frans Hals catalogue of the 1989 international Frans Hals exhibition, though these portraits were only shown in Haarlem and in London and did not travel to Washington D.C. That exhibition was the first time the portraits were seen hanging side-by-side since they were split up, and they haven't been seen together since. The couple lived after their marriage at Koningstraat 18 in Haarlem, which still exists as a protected rijksmonument.

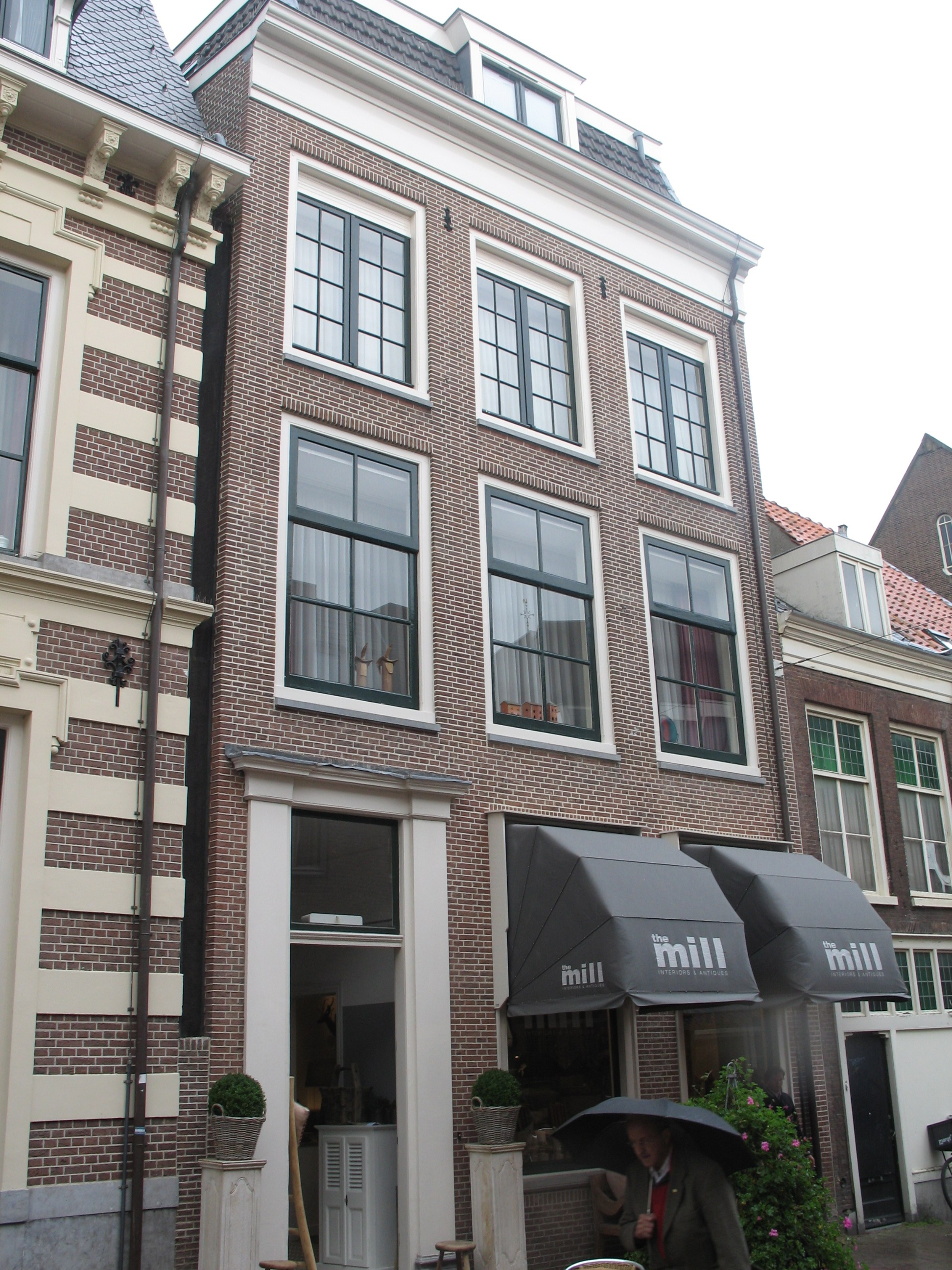
Koningstraat 18 in Haarlem

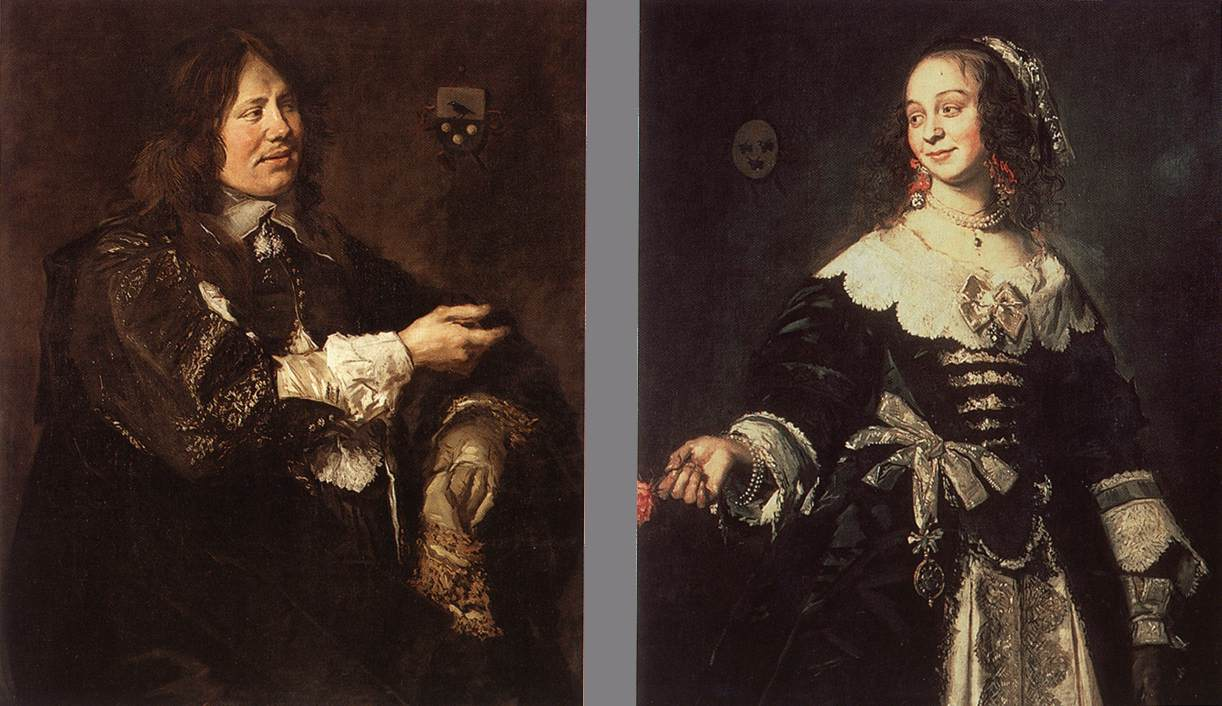
The pendants together

The art historian Cornelis Hofstede de Groot mixed Isabella's portrait provenance with a weak copy that was shown at the Hudson-Fulton Celebration in 1909. Called The Lady with the Rose, the copyist included the whole rose instead of the cut version. Since being sold in 1866, Stephan has remained in the Antwerp Museum, and Isabella has remained in the Paris Rothschild collection. In 1962 the Frans Hals Museum had a large-scale exhibition of Hals paintings and Stephan was included, but the museum was so disappointed that Isabella couldn't come that they gave her a catalog number anyway and included a photograph as illustration for Stephan's portrait.
