= Doopsgezinde Weeshuis, Haarlem =

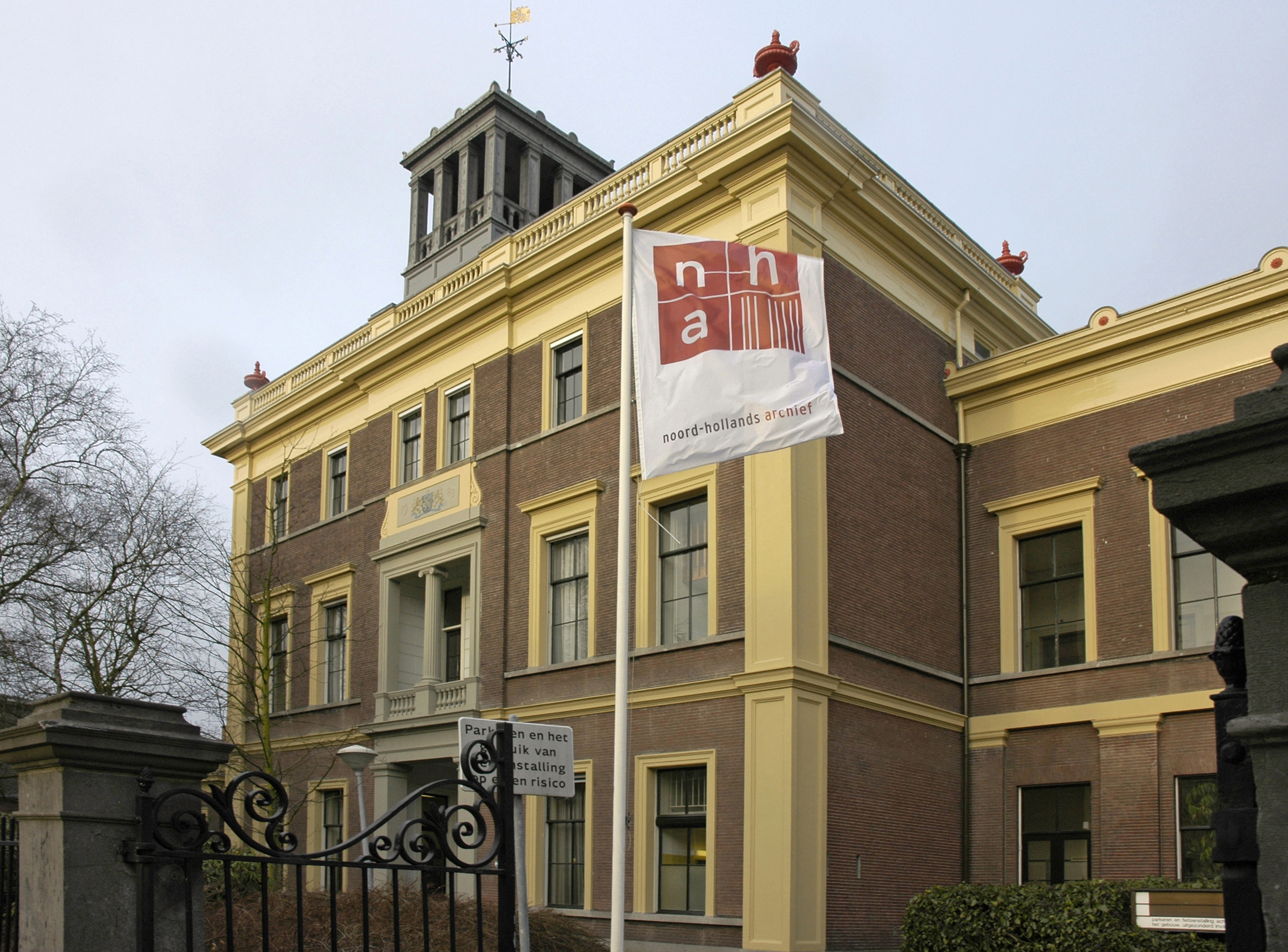
- Imposing front of the Mennonite orphanage, today converted to archives of the city of Haarlem
- Interactive map of the Doopsgezinde Weeshuis, Haarlem area

General information
- Type: orphanage
- Architectural style: neo-classical
- Location: Haarlem, Kleine Houtweg 18
- Coordinates: 52°22′29.42″N 4°38′3.63″E
- Completed: 1874

Design and construction
- Architect: A. van der Linden

The Doopsgezinde Weeshuis is a former orphanage in Haarlem. The complex was designed by A. van der Linden to replace the old orphanage located at the Klein Heiligland 58, which had been in use since 1634.

== History ==
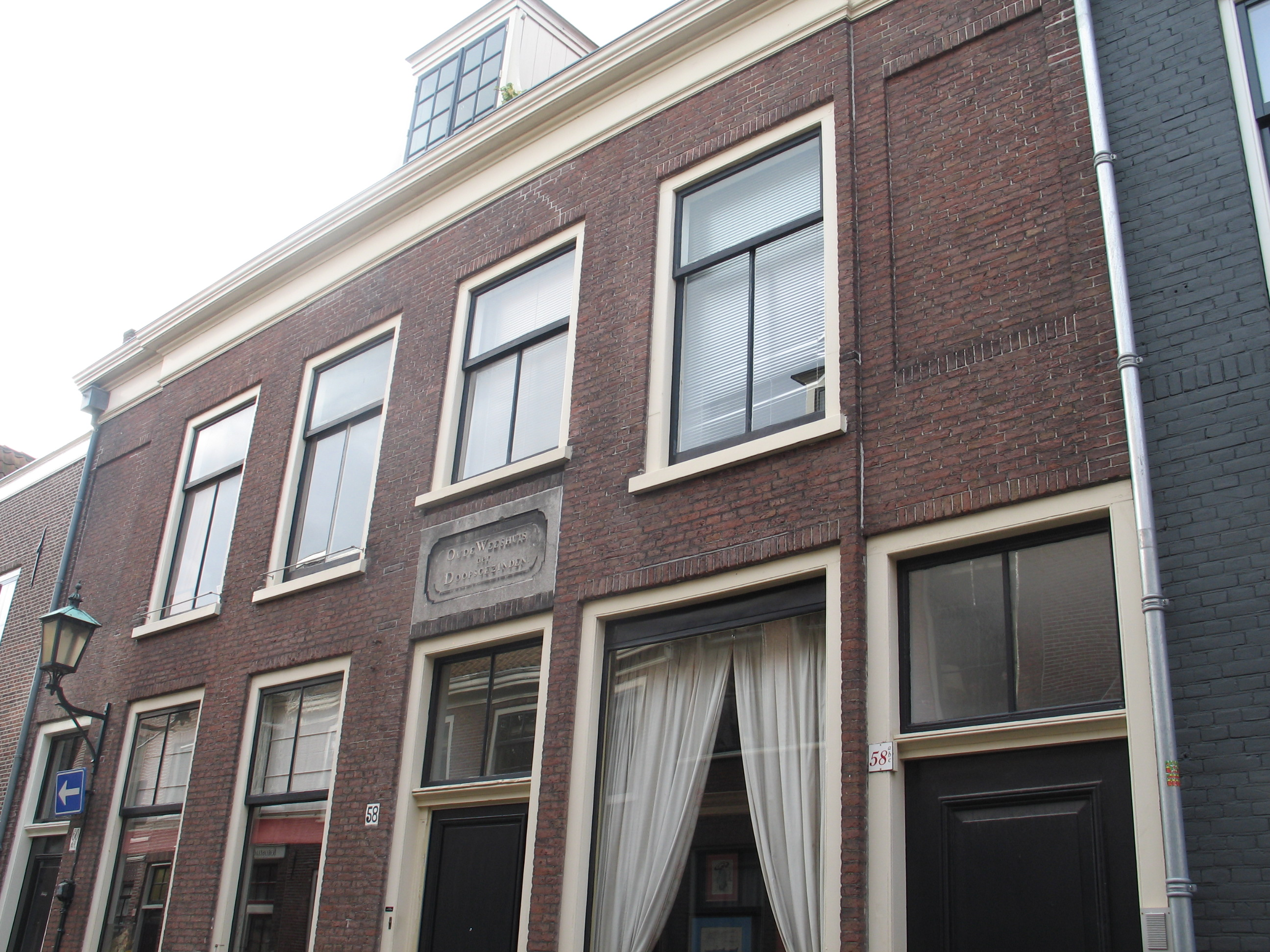
Former Mennonite orphanage on the Klein Heiligland, nr. 58. The keystone is new, and the original is in the Doopsgezinde kerk, Haarlem.

The building had running water, which was new, and two large meeting rooms for the regents, one for the 4 regents, and one for the 4 regentesses. Once a year they would dine there, and once a year all the orphans of Haarlem would be treated to buns on Pieter Teyler van der Hulst's birthday, as stipulated in his will and testament. Jan Adam Kruseman painted the large group portrait of the regents, featuring a few of the orphans wearing their habitual Mennonite orphan dress (the city orphans had one red sleeve and one blue sleeve, but Mennonite orphans wore brown).

In 1939, the building was confiscated for military purposes and the orphanage moved to Baan 25. Under german rule it became a works council, and in 1983 the archives moved here. The regent rooms have remained largely intact.

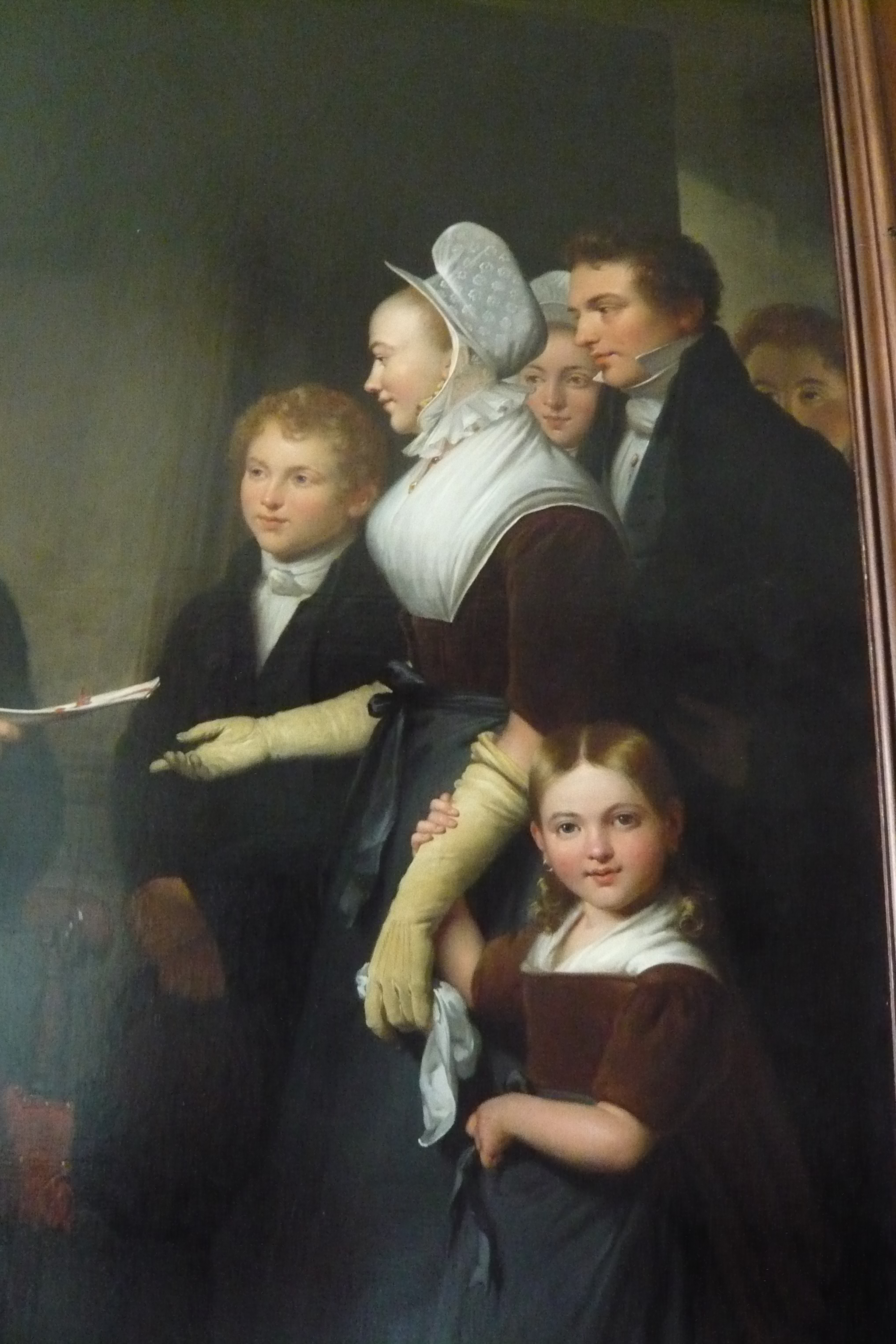
Detail of Kruseman's painting featuring the orphans

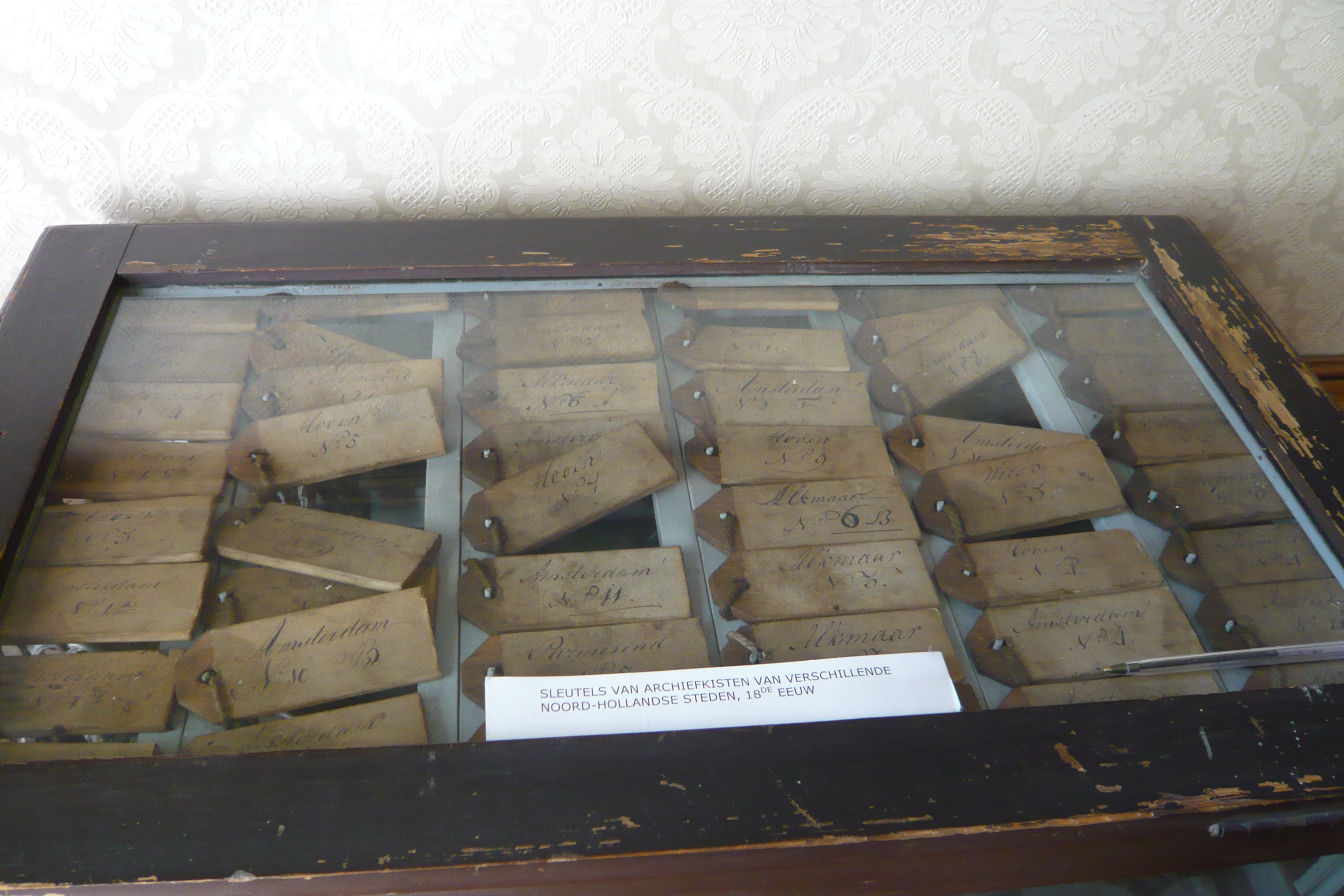
Old key chest in one of the regent's rooms.

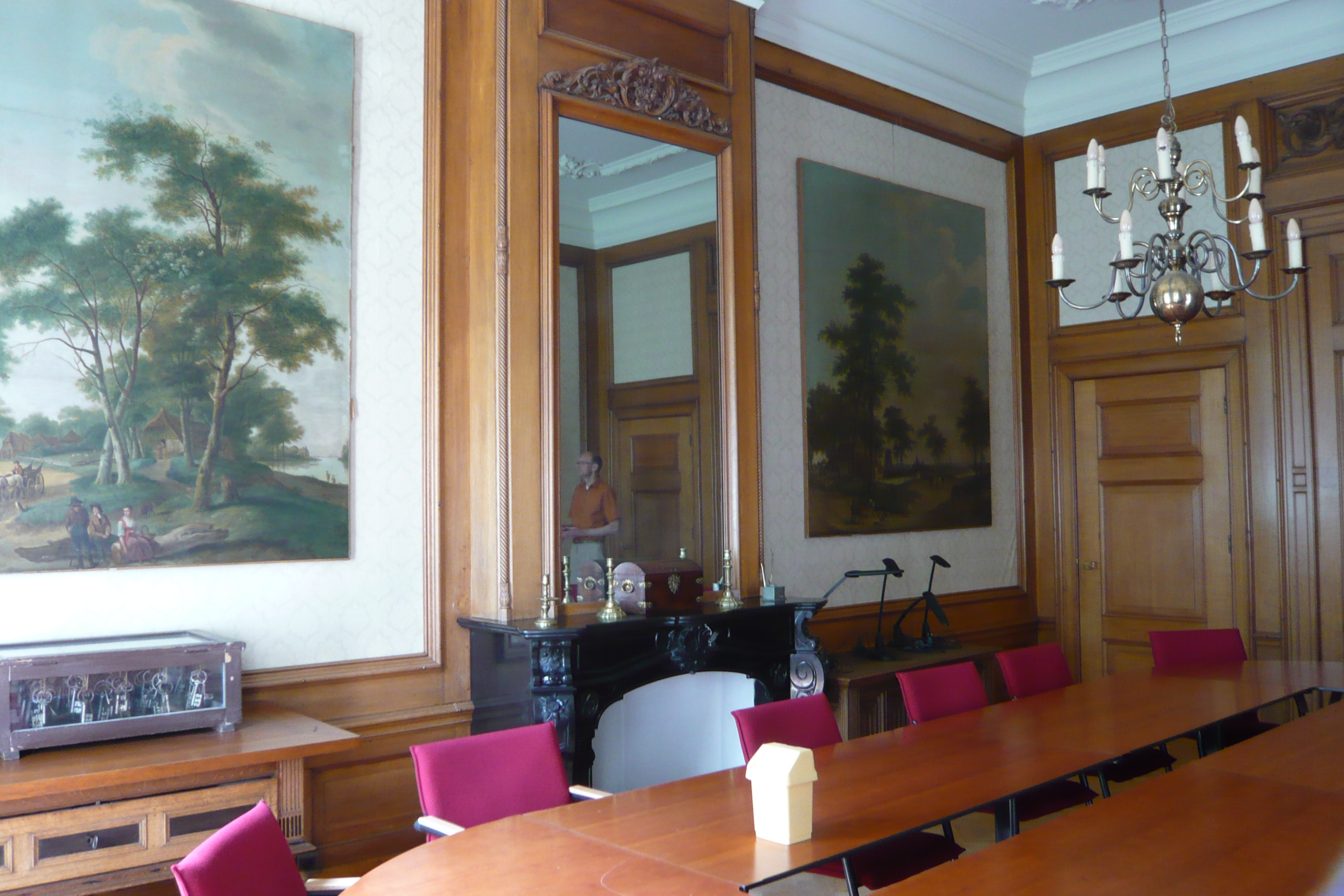
Regent's room, now a meeting room
