= Teylers Hofje =

Hofje in Haarlem, Netherlands with 24 houses

Coordinates: 52°22′55″N 4°38′35″E

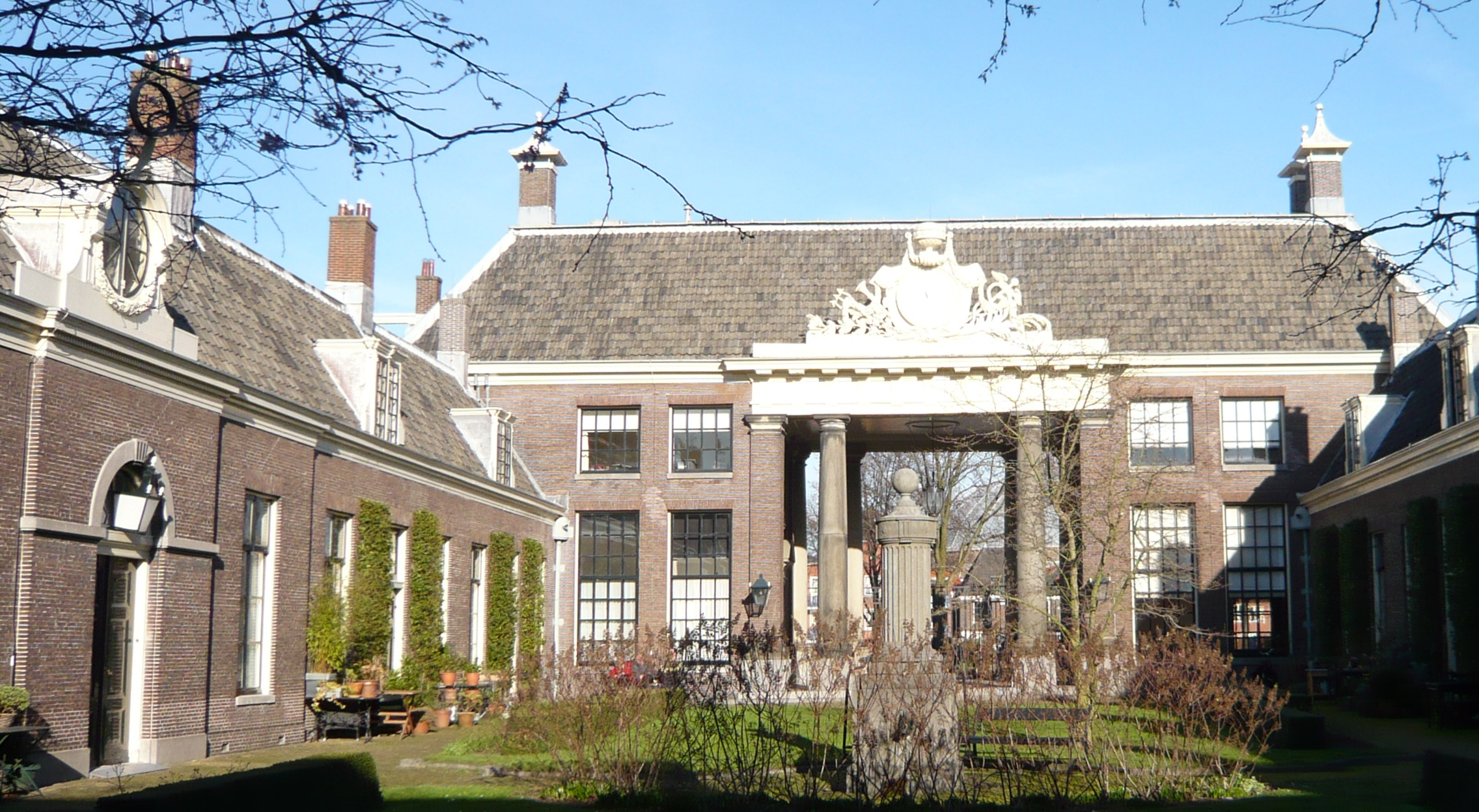
Teylers Hofje - view from the garden back towards the gate.

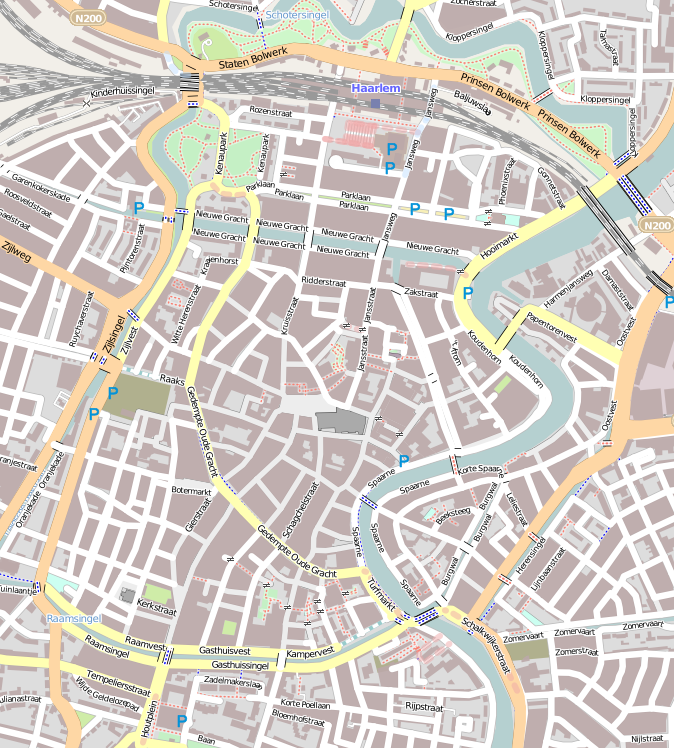
The Teylers Hofje and the Teylers Museum overlook the Spaarne river, and the Vrouwe- en Antonie Gasthuys is on the Klein Heiligland.

The Teylershofje is a hofje in Haarlem, Netherlands with 24 houses.

== History of the foundation ==
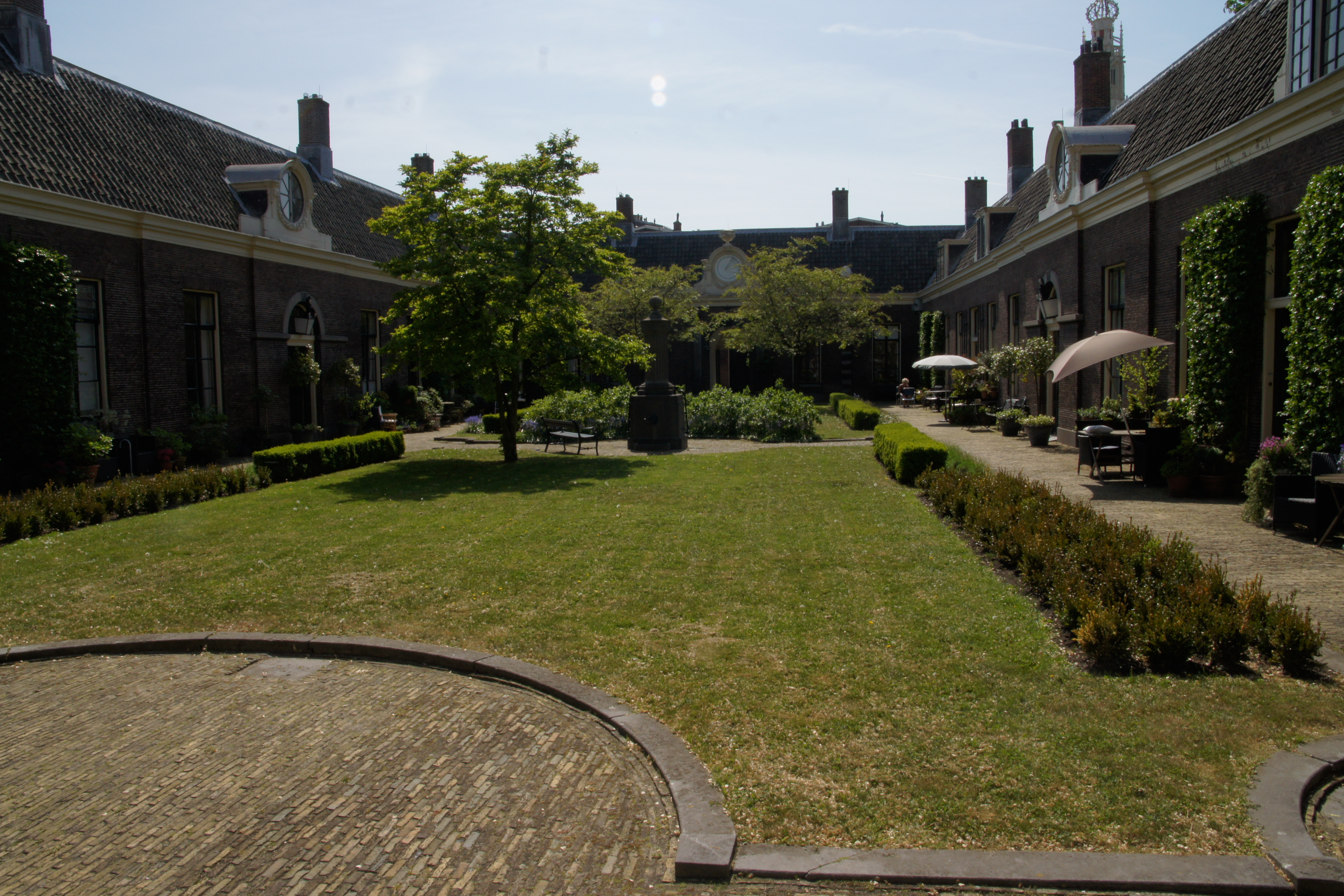
Teylers Hofje, as seen from inside the main gate during the spring.

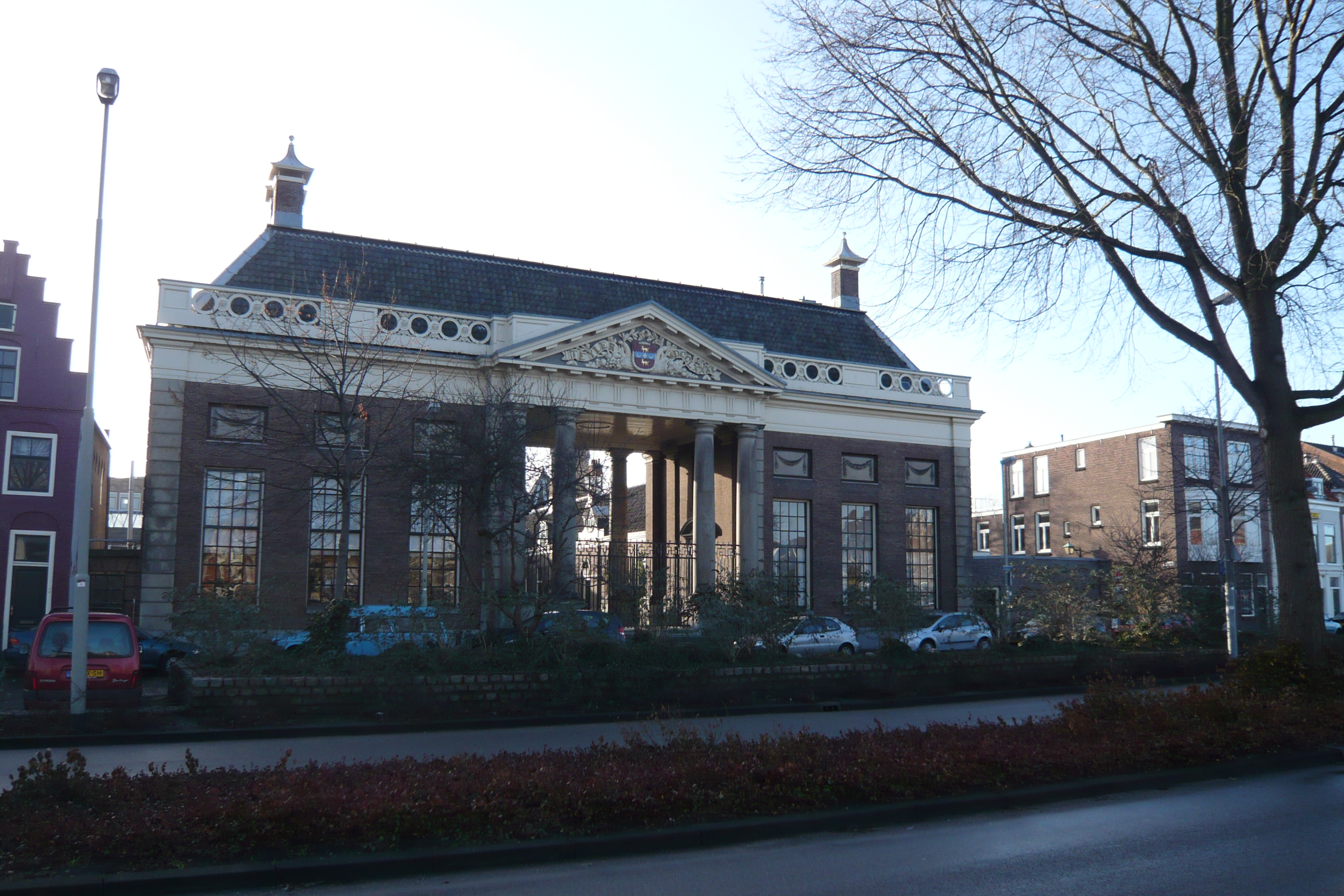
Imposing gate overlooking the Spaarne river.

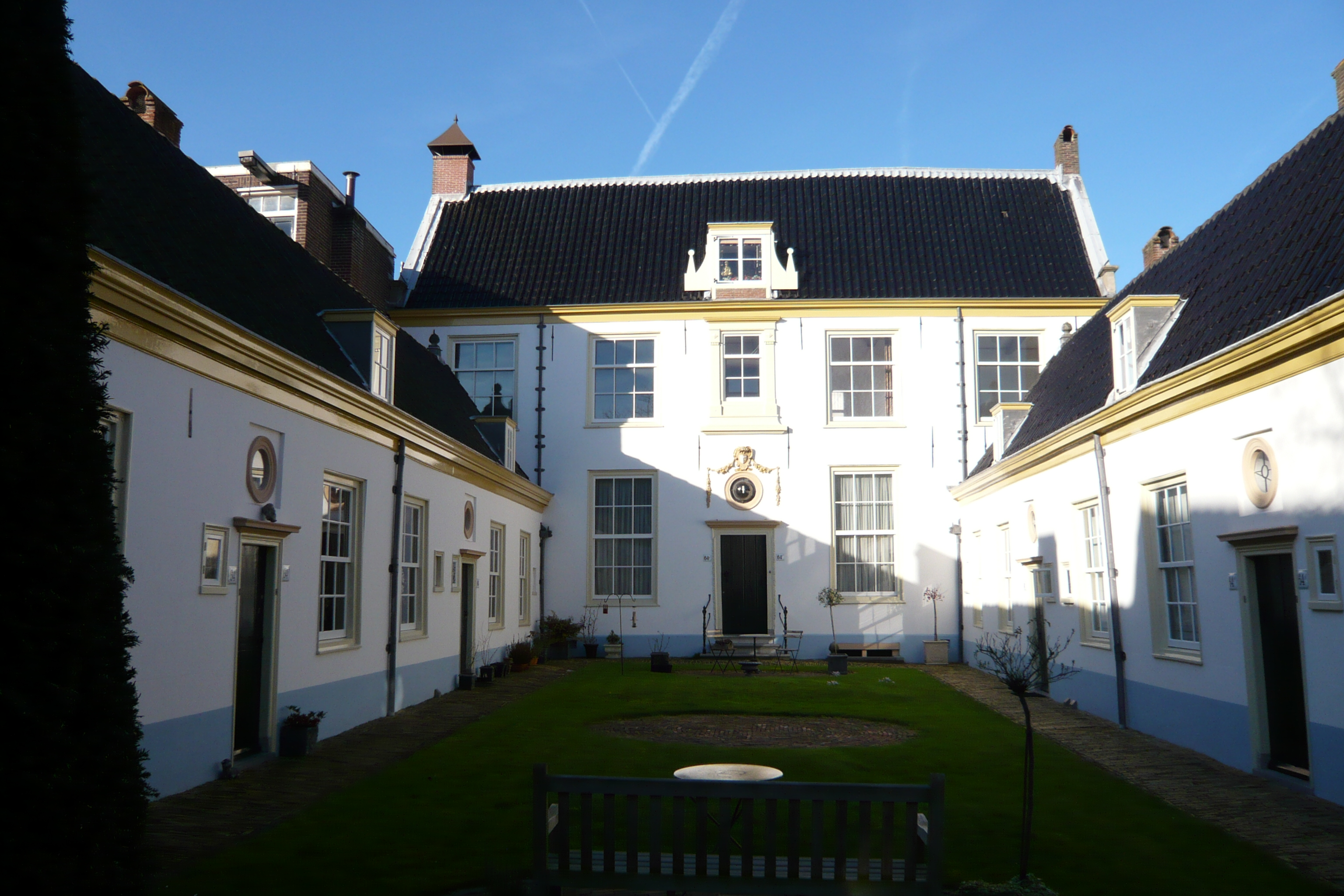
The hofje currently known as the Vrouwe- en Antonie Gasthuis on the Klein Heiligland behind the Frans Hals Museum, was originally built by Pieter Joosten Boogaert as a Mennonite hofje in ca. 1620. Teyler bought it several generations later in 1752 from the Mennonite Coymans.

The current hofje was built in 1787 from the legacy of Pieter Teyler van der Hulst, just like the Teylers Museum close to it. Pieter Teyler van der Hulst founded a hofje when his wife died in 1752 and he then purchased the Kolder hofje. That hofje was considerably renovated during his lifetime, but he found it still needed improvements for the residents. In his will he stipulated that a new hofje should be built in his name and the old hofje premises sold (and the premises were then sold to the oldest surviving hofje foundation in Haarlem, the 'Vrouwe- en Antonie Gasthuys'). The "new" hofje is by far the most impressive and imposing hofje in Haarlem.

== Stylish location ==
In Teylers's day, most visitors to the city of Haarlem from Amsterdam would travel by trekschuit along the 'Stadsbuiten' canal (now the Papentorenvest street) joining the Spaarne just north of this hofje. The first building they would see across the Spaarne was the immense classical building of the Catholic Diocese (now the Police station). Next they would pass the location of this hofje, and further around the bend, the Damstraat, where Teyler's house is located. His museum, which is located in the back garden of his house, competed with the Dutch Society of Science for scientific research.

== Mennonites vs Catholics ==
It would have been Teyler's express wish to have his hofje located on the Spaarne, in the same way that the executors of his will defining the Teyler's Museum chose later to build a new front entrance facing the Spaarne and leading visitors to the side entrance of the 'oval room'. The hall of the Diocese, which was used for meetings of the 'Economical branch of the Dutch Society for Science', would have impressed Teyler. It took several years to build the Catholic Diocese, from 1760 to 1772, and Pieter Teyler van der Hulst would have attended the meetings there as a member, but he could not become a board member due to his religion. He was a Mennonite. In order to get around this, he founded his own 'society of science', which later became the Teylers Museum. Ironically, both his museum and the Dutch Society of Science are now across from each other on the Spaarne and were merged in 1831.

== Architecture ==
This hofje was built by the popular contemporary architect Leendert Viervant, who designed several other neo-classical objects in the 1780s in Haarlem. The hofje has a neo-classical facade and the doorway is flanked by Doric columns.

Address: Koudenhorn 64
