= Marine art =

Form of figurative art that portrays or draws its main inspiration from the sea

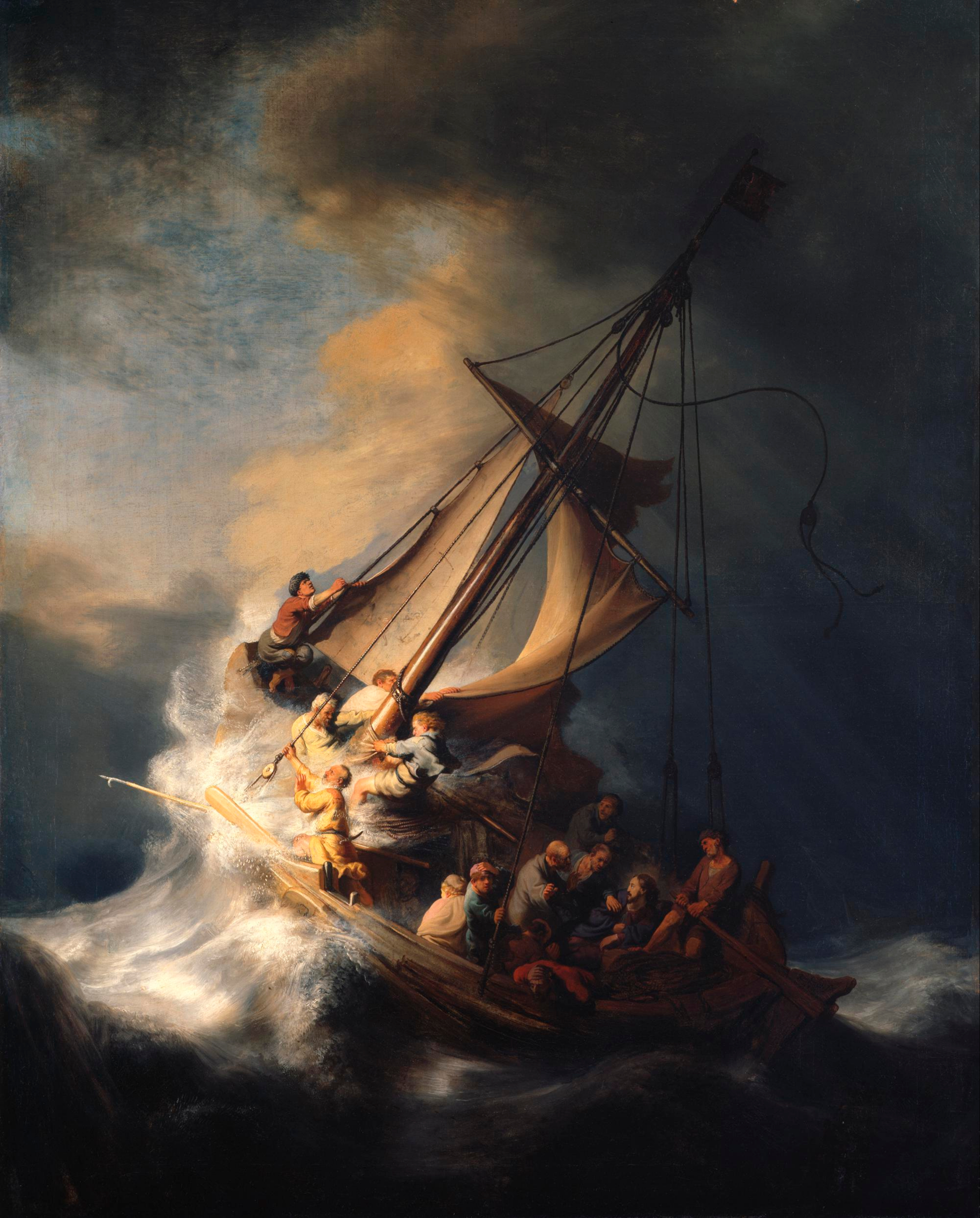
Rembrandt's stolen masterpiece, The Storm on the Sea of Galilee (1633).

Marine art or maritime art is a form of figurative art (i.e. painting, drawing, printmaking, and sculpture) that portrays or draws its main inspiration from the sea. Maritime painting is a genre that depicts ships and the sea, being particularly strong from the 17th to the 19th centuries. In practice, the term often covers art showing shipping on rivers and estuaries, beach scenes and all art showing boats, without any rigid distinction—for practical reasons subjects that can be drawn or painted from dry land in fact feature strongly in the genre. Strictly speaking, "maritime art" should always include some element of human seafaring, whereas "marine art" would also include pure seascapes without any human element, though this distinction may not be observed in practice.

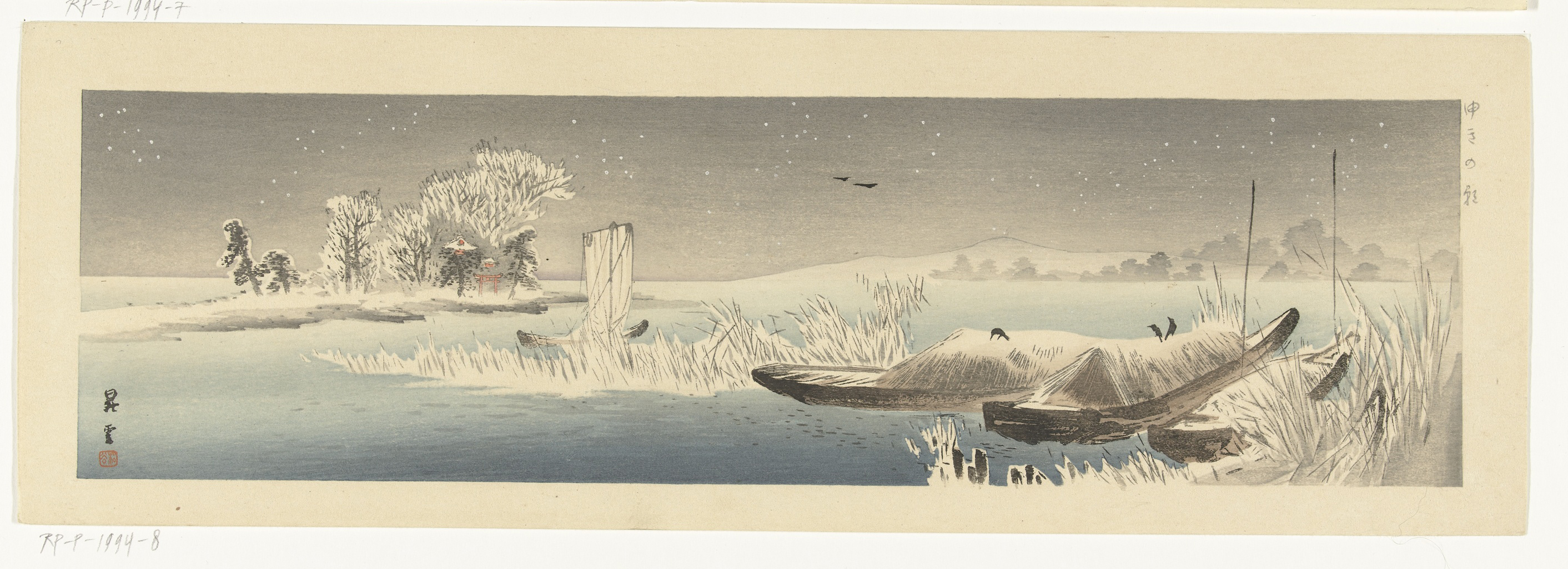
20th-century ukiyo-e print of Boats in Snow

Ships and boats have been included in art from almost the earliest times, but marine art only began to become a distinct genre, with specialized artists, towards the end of the Middle Ages, mostly in the form of the "ship portrait", a type of work that is still popular and concentrates on depicting a single vessel. As landscape art emerged during the Renaissance, what might be called the marine landscape became a more important element in works, but pure seascapes were rare until later.

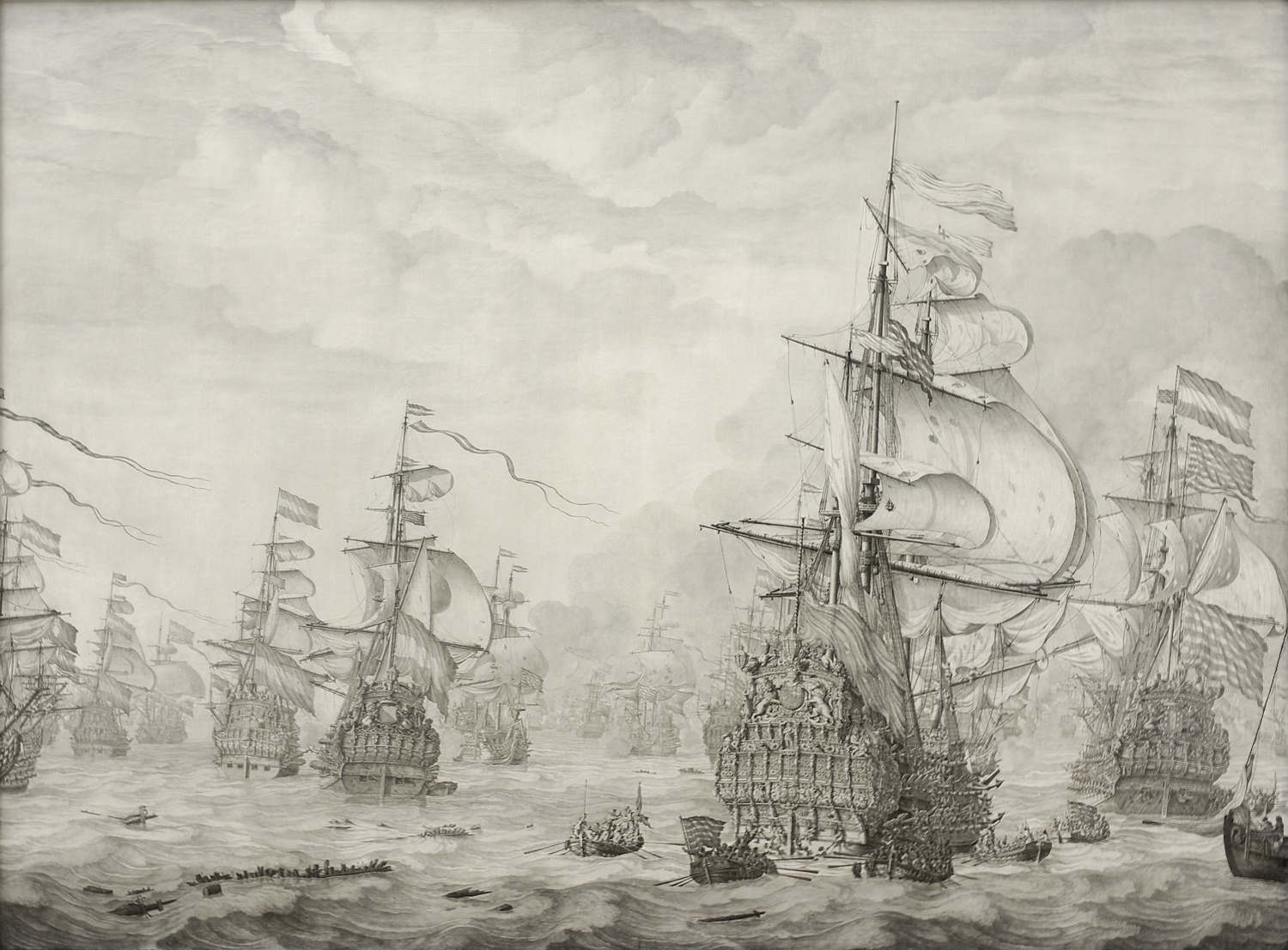
Willem van de Velde the Elder's The Capture of the Royal Prince during the Four Days' Battle, 1666.

Maritime art, especially marine painting—as a particular genre separate from landscape—actually began with Dutch Golden Age painting in the 17th century. Marine painting was a major genre within Dutch Golden Age painting, reflecting the importance of overseas trade and naval power to the Dutch Republic, and saw the first career marine artists, who painted little else. In this, as in much else, specialist and traditional marine painting has largely continued Dutch conventions to the present day. With Romantic art, the sea and the coast was reclaimed from the specialists by many landscape painters, and works including no vessels became common for the first time.

== Earliest times to 1400 ==
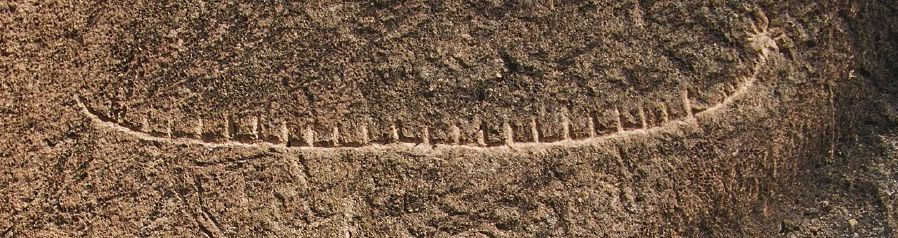
The reed boat petroglyph at Gobustan.

Vessels on the water have featured in art from the earliest times. The earliest known works are petroglyphs from 12,000 BCE showing reed boats in the Gobustan Petroglyph Reserve in modern Azerbaijan, which was then on the edge of the much larger Caspian Sea. Rock carvings and carved objects depicting ships have been found on several islands of the Aegean (Andros, Naxos, Syros, Astypalaia, Santorini) as well as mainland Greece (Avlis), dating from 4,000 BCE onwards.

Both men and gods are shown on river "barges" in Ancient Egyptian art; these boats were made of papyrus reed for most uses, but the vessels used by the pharaohs were of costly imported cedar wood, like the 43.6 m (143 ft) long and 5.9 m (19.5 ft) wide Khufu ship of c. 2,500. Nilotic landscapes in fresco in Egyptian tombs often show scenes of hunting birds from boats in the Nile delta, and grave goods include detailed models of boats and their crews for use in the afterlife. The central cult image in Egyptian temples was usually a small figure of the god, carried in a barge or "barque".

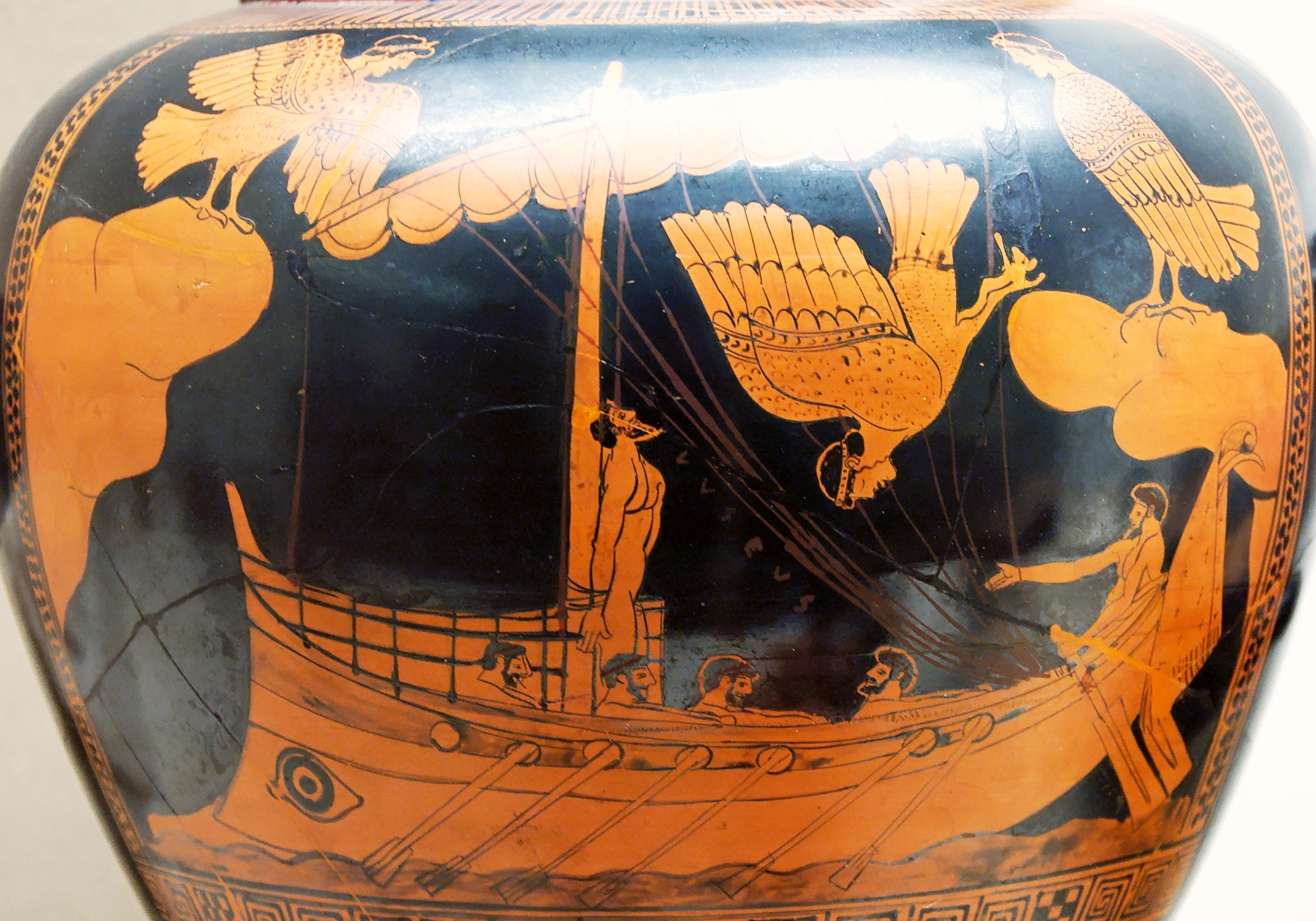
Odysseus and the Sirens. Detail from an Attic red-figured stamnos, c. 480–470 BC

Ships sometimes appear in Ancient Greek vase painting, especially when relevant in a narrative context, and also on coins and other contexts, though with little attempt at a seascape setting. As in Egyptian painting, the surface of the water may be indicated by a series of parallel wavy lines. Ancient Roman painting, presumably drawing on Greek traditions, very often shows landscape views from the land across a lake or bay with distant land on the horizon, as in the famous "Ulysses" paintings in the Vatican Museums. The water is usually calm, and objects that are submerged, or partly so, may be shown through the water. The large Nile mosaic of Palestrina (1st-century BCE) is a version of such compositions, with a view intended to show all the course of the river.

From Late Antiquity to the end of the Middle Ages marine subjects were shown when required for narrative purposes, but did not form a genre in the West, or in Asian ink painting traditions, where a river with a small boat or two was a standard component of scholar landscapes. Marine highlights in Medieval art include the 11th-century Bayeux Tapestry showing the Norman Invasion of England. From the 12th century onwards, seals of ports often featured a "ship portrait". The ship functioned as an image of the church, as in Giotto's lost Navicella above the entrance to Old St Peter's in Rome, but such representations are of relatively little interest from the purely marine point of view.

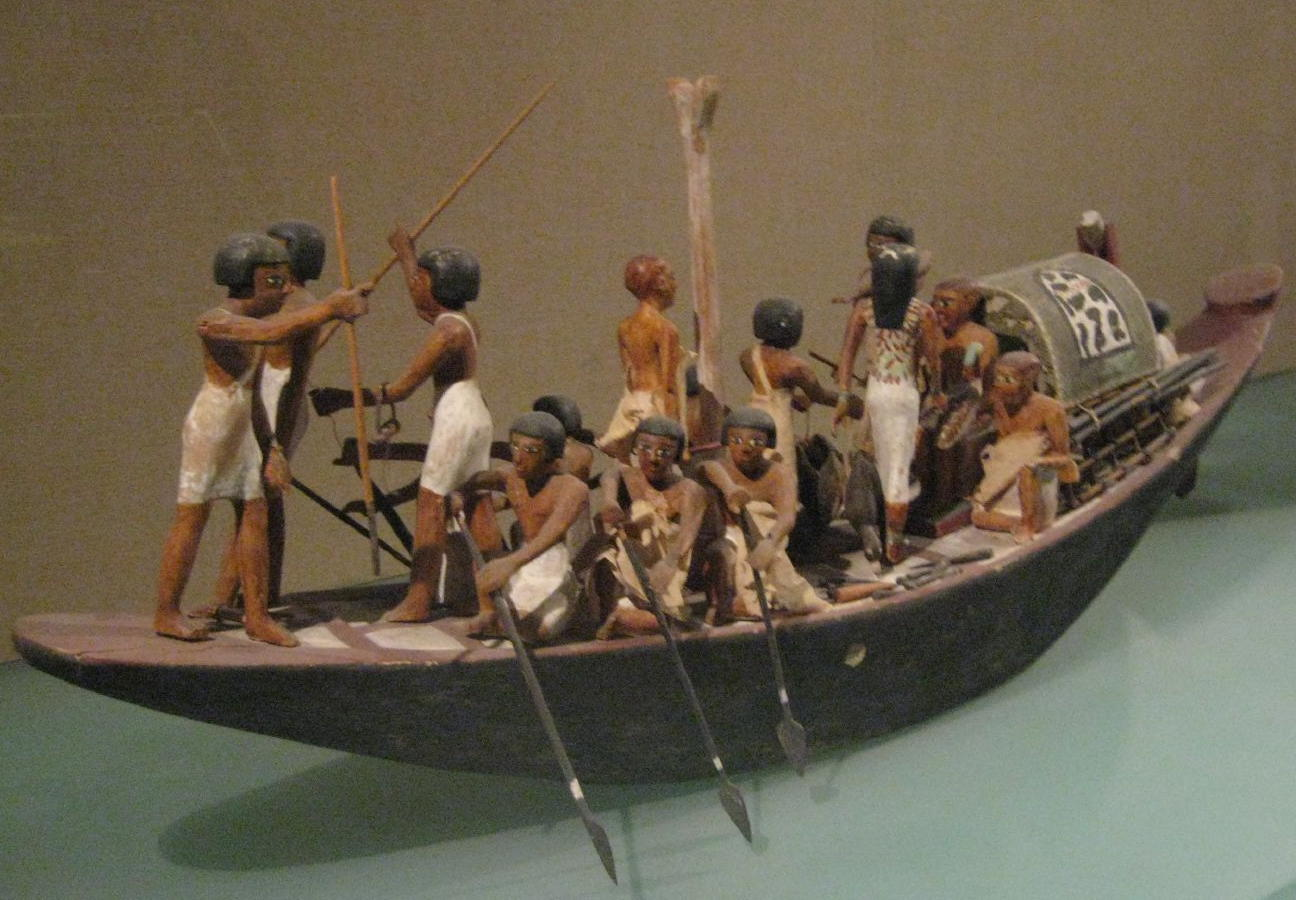
Egyptian model boat, 12th dynasty, Amenemhet I

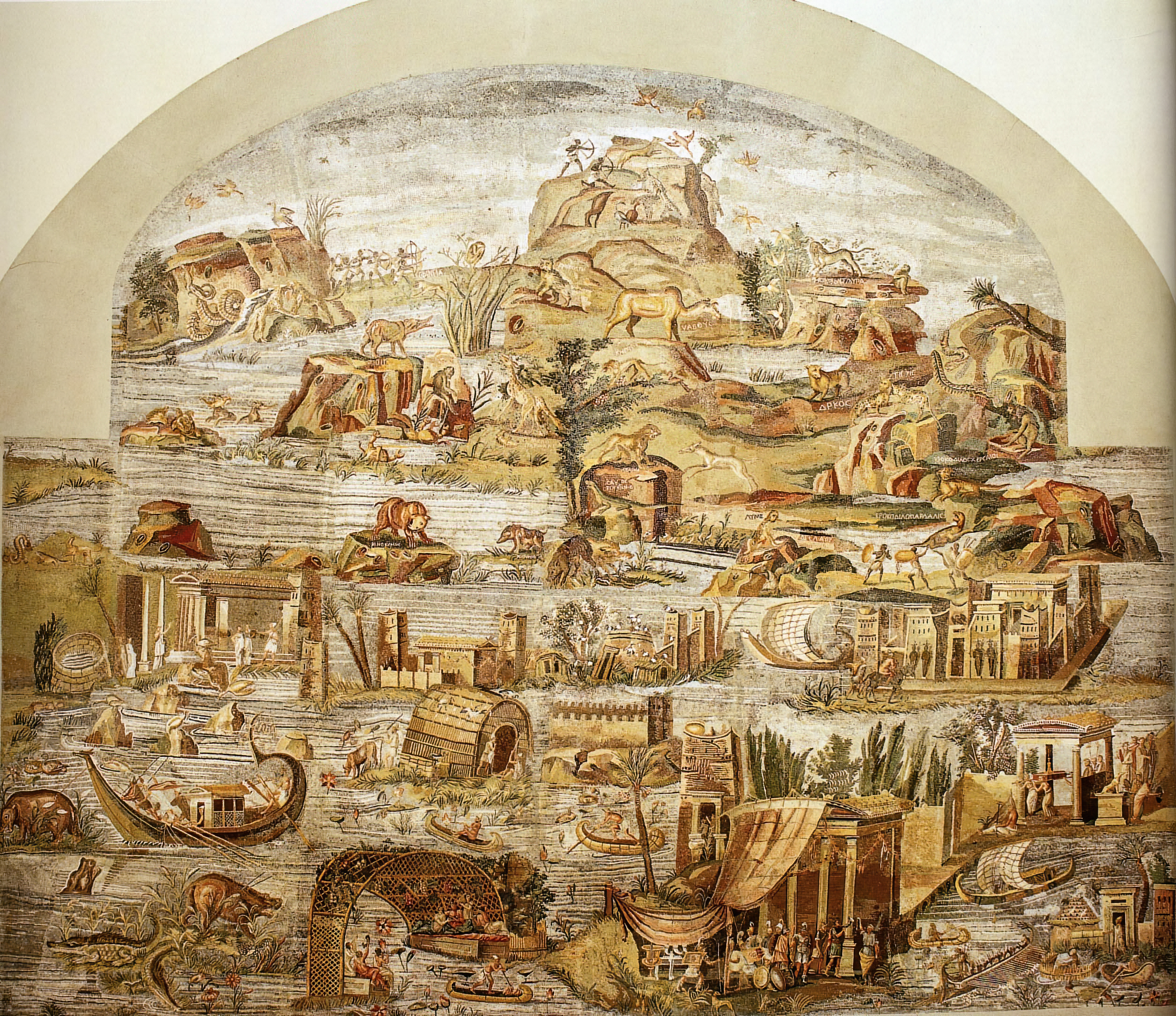
Nile mosaic of Palestrina (1st-century BCE)

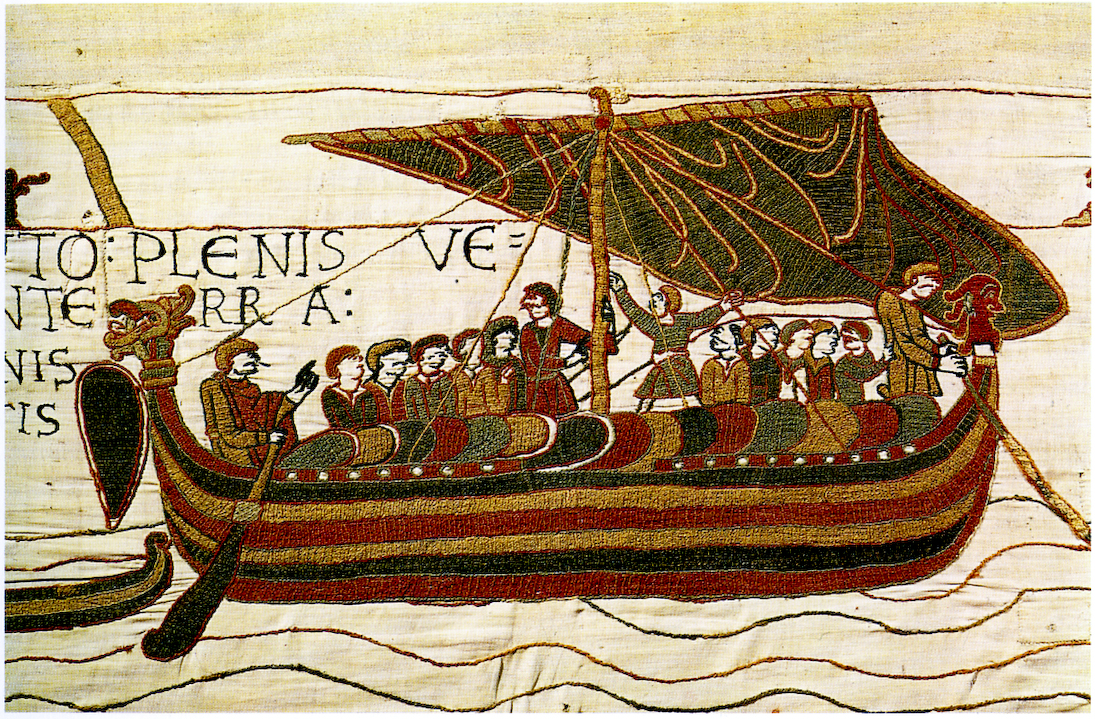
Norman ship of the invasion fleet, Bayeux Tapestry, 11th century

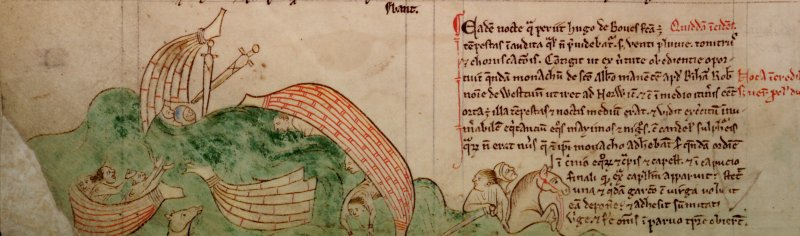
Shipwreck of Hugh de Boves by Matthew Paris, 13th century, English

== 15th century ==
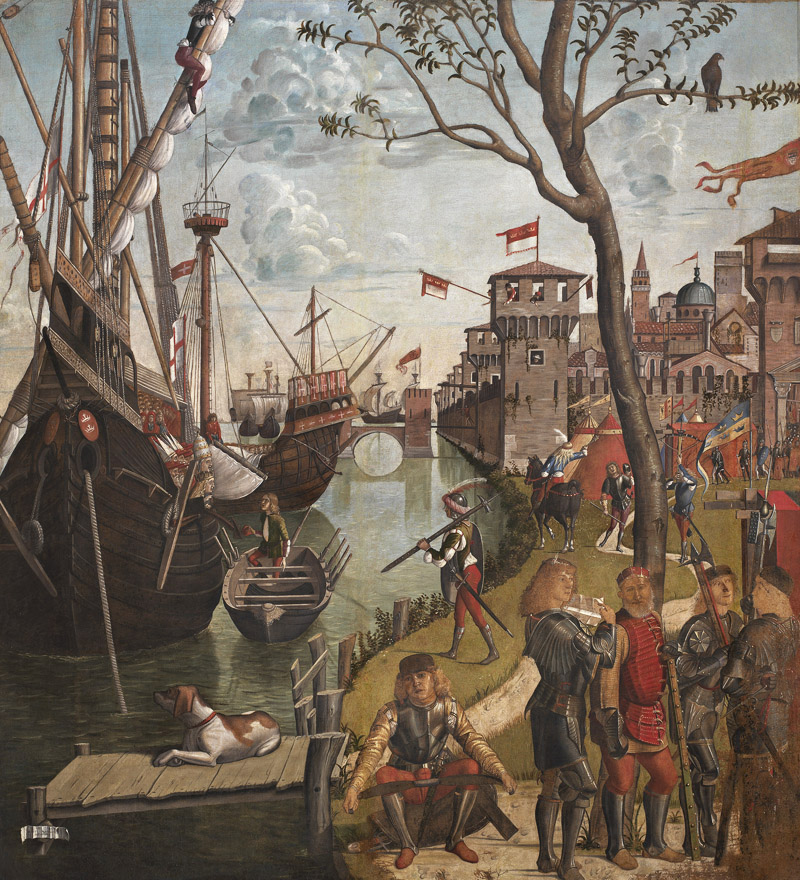
Vittore Carpaccio, Arrival of the Pilgrims in Cologne, 1490.

A distinct tradition begins to re-emerge in Early Netherlandish painting, with two lost miniatures in the Turin-Milan Hours, probably by Jan van Eyck in about 1420, showing a huge leap in the depiction of the sea and its weather. Of the seashore scene called The Prayer on the Shore (or Duke William of Bavaria at the Seashore, the Sovereign's prayer etc.) Kenneth Clark says: "The figures in the foreground are in the chivalric style of the de Limbourgs; but the sea shore beyond them is completely outside the 15th-century range of responsiveness, and we see nothing like it again until Jacob van Ruisdael's beach-scenes of the mid-17th century." There was also a true seascape, the Voyage of St Julian & St Martha, but both pages were destroyed in a fire in 1904, and only survive in black and white photographs. For the rest of the 15th century, illuminated manuscript painting was the main medium of marine painting, and in France and Burgundy in particular many artists became skilled in increasingly realistic depictions of both seas and ships, used in illustrations of wars, romances and court life, as well as religious scenes. Scenes of small pleasure boats on rivers sometimes feature in the calendar miniatures from books of hours by artists such as Simon Bening.

During the Gothic period the nef, a large piece of goldsmith's work in the shape of a ship, used for holding cutlery, salt or spices, became popular among the grand. Initially just consisting of the "hull", from the 15th century the most elaborate had masts, sails and even crew. As the exotic nautilus shell began to reach Europe, many used these for their hull, like the Burghley Nef of about 1528. Lower down the social scale, interest in shipping was reflected in many early prints of ships. The earliest are by Master W with the Key, who produced several engravings of ships; for some time such "ship portraits" were confined to prints and drawings, and typically showed the ship with no crew, even if under sail. They also usually anticipated the low horizon that painting would not achieve until the 17th century. The first print of a naval battle is an enormous (548 x 800 mm) woodcut of the Battle of Zonchio in 1499 between the Venetians and the Turks. The only surviving impression is coloured with stencils; most were probably pasted onto walls. The earliest comparable painting to survive comes from several decades later.

At the same time, artists were often involved in the expansion of Western cartography, and more aware than might always seem evident of the scientific and nautical advances of the age. According to Margarita Russell, one of Erhard Reuwich's woodcuts from the first printed travel book (1486) shows him trying to demonstrate his understanding of the curvature of the Earth with a ship half-seen on the horizon. The many coastal views in the book's woodcuts are important in the development of such representations. Birds-eye plans of cities, often coastal, which we would today usually consider as cartography, were often done by artists, and considered as much as works of art as maps by contemporaries.

Italian Renaissance art showed maritime scenes when required, but apart from the Venetian artist Vittore Carpaccio there were few artists in this or the next century who often returned to such scenes, or did so with special sensitivity. Carpaccio's scenes show Venetian canals or docksides; there are several arrivals and departures in his Legend of Saint Ursula. In the German-speaking lands, Konrad Witz's Miraculous Draught of Fishes (1444) is both the first landscape painting to show a recognisable rural location, and an atmospheric view across Lake Geneva.

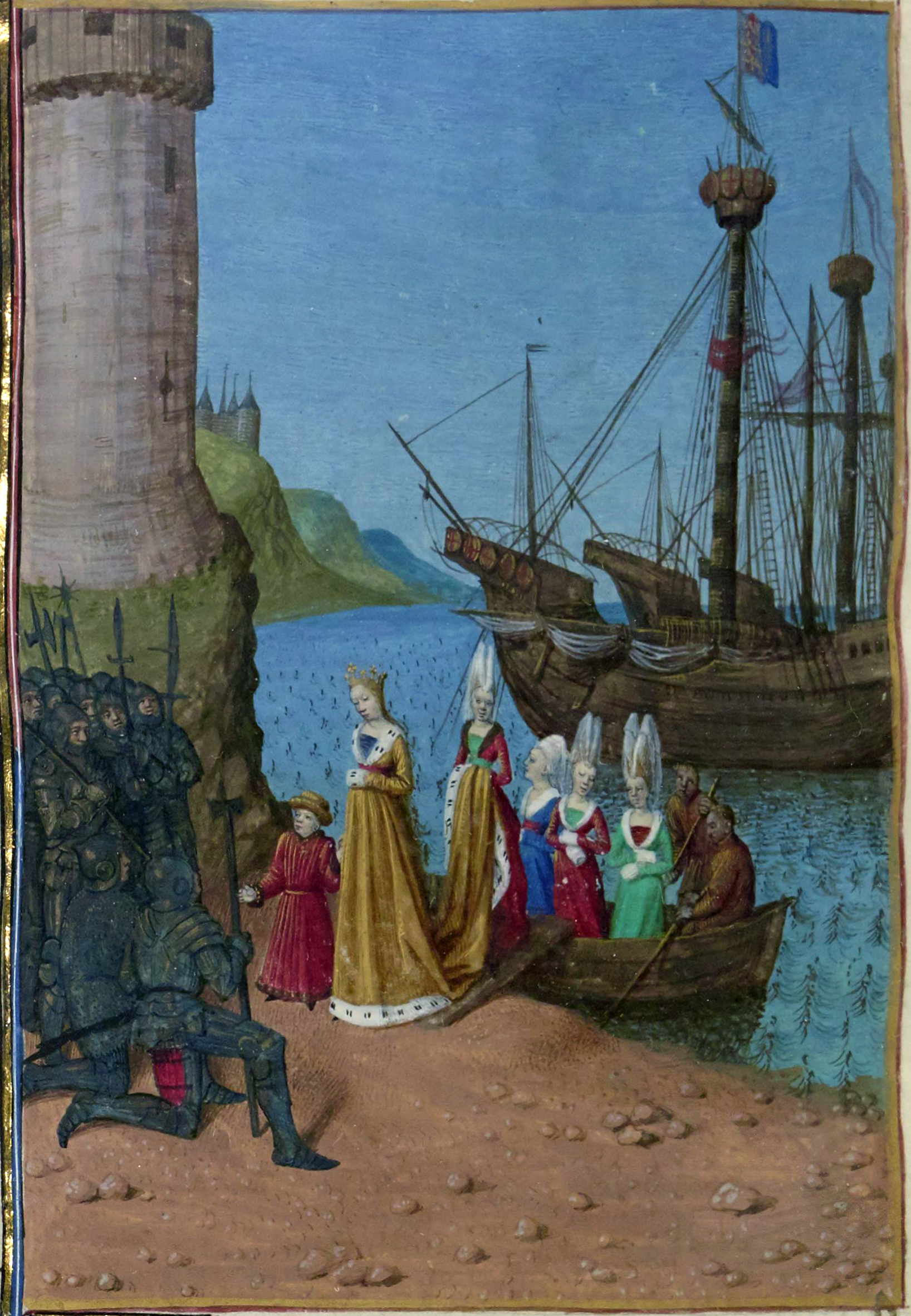
Isabel of France lands at Harwich; miniature of 1455–1460 by Jean Fouquet

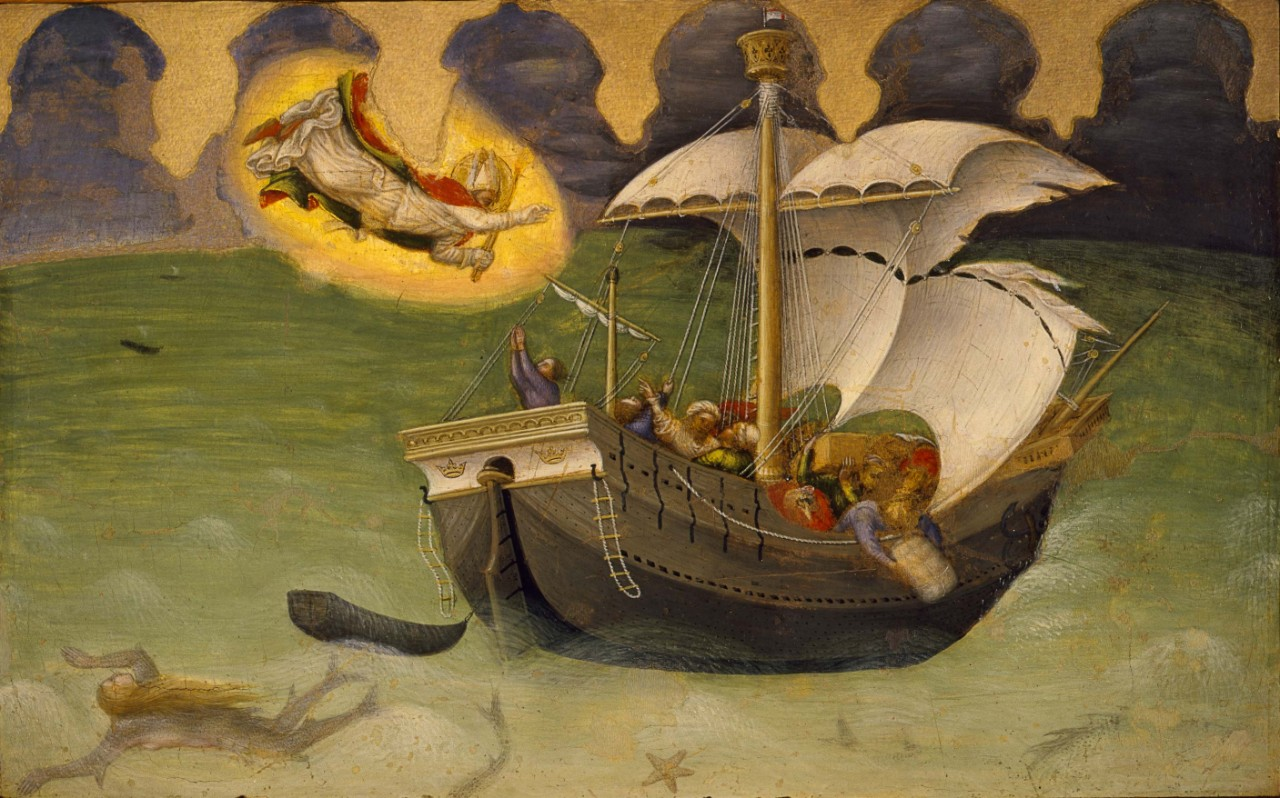
Gentile da Fabriano, a miracle of St Nicholas of Bari

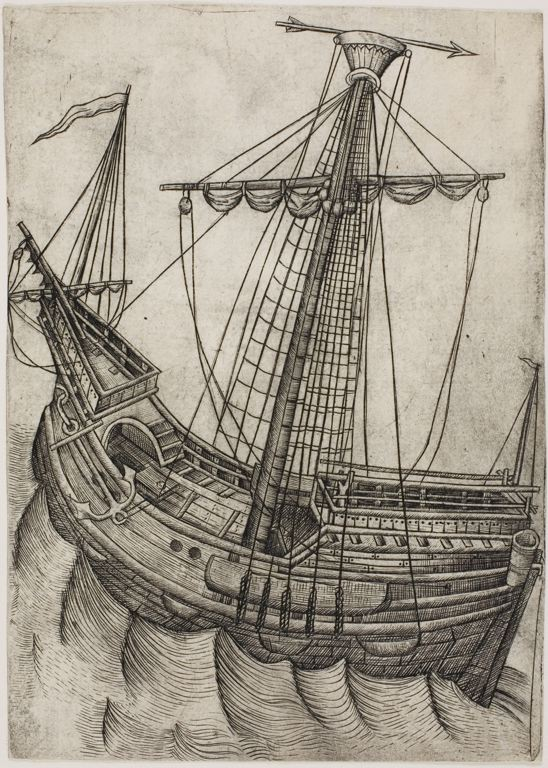
Engraving by Master W with the Key

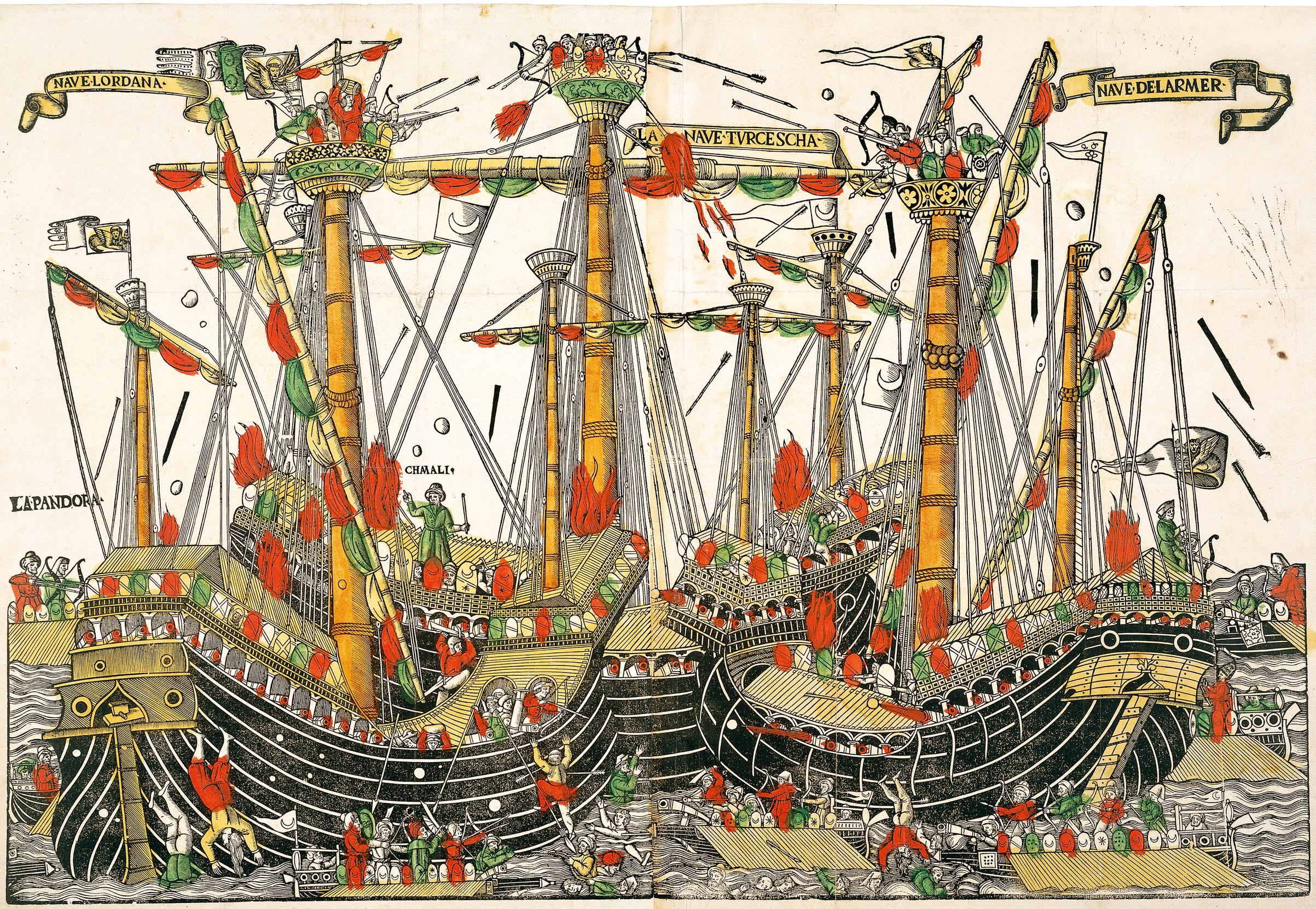
Woodcut with colour of the Battle of Zonchio in 1499

== 16th century ==
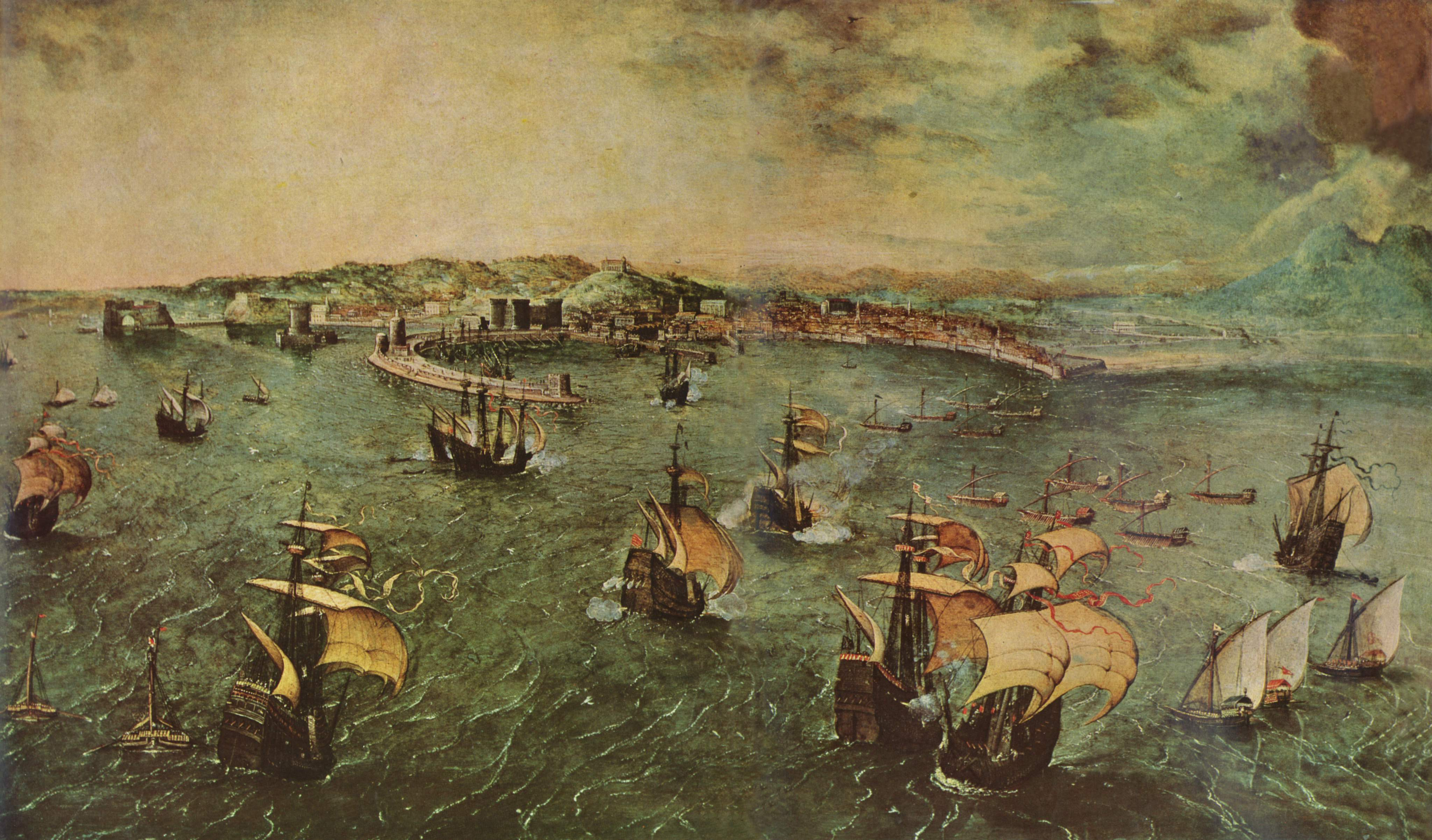
Peter Brueghel, Naval Battle in the Gulf of Naples, (The Harbour of Naples), c. 1558

The Netherlandish tradition of the "world landscape", a panoramic view from a very high viewpoint, pioneered by Joachim Patinir in the 1520s, once again begins to include a wide expanse of water in a rather similar way to the classical paintings, which these artists cannot have been aware of. These paintings were essentially landscapes in the guise of history paintings, with small figures usually representing a religious subject. A strong marine element was therefore present as landscape painting began to emerge as a distinct genre. The Protestant Reformation greatly restricted the uses of religious art, accelerating to the development of other secular types of art in Protestant countries, including landscape art and secular forms of history painting, which could both form part of marine art.

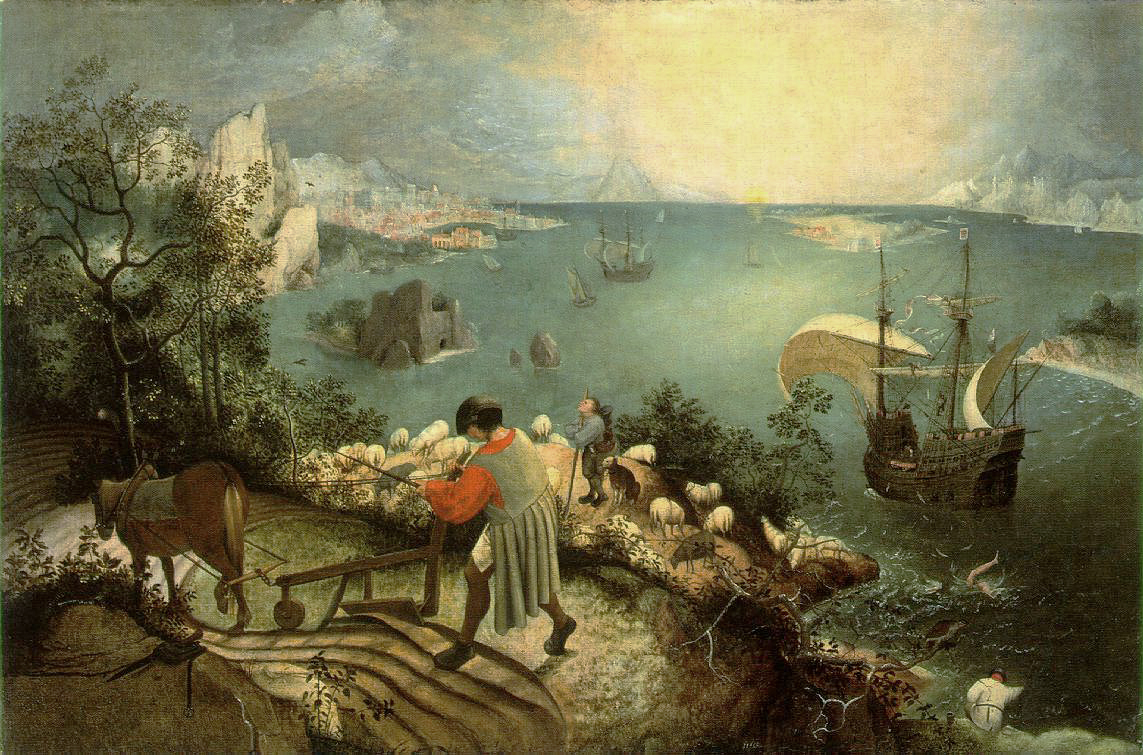
Landscape with the Fall of Icarus, Royal Museums of Fine Arts of Belgium, now seen as a good early copy of Bruegel's original

An important work by a Flemish "follower of Patenir" is the Portuguese Carracks off a Rocky Coast of about 1540 (787 x 1447 mm), in the National Maritime Museum, Greenwich, London, "which has justly been labelled the earliest known pure marine painting". This probably represents the meeting of two small fleets involved in escorting a Portuguese princess going to be married; a type of ceremonial maritime subject which remained very common in court art until the late 17th century, although more often set at the point of embarkation or arrival. Another example is the painting in the Royal Collection showing Henry VIII embarking for the Field of the Cloth of Gold, which is typical in clearly showing the ships side-on, with no attempt to adjust for the high view point.

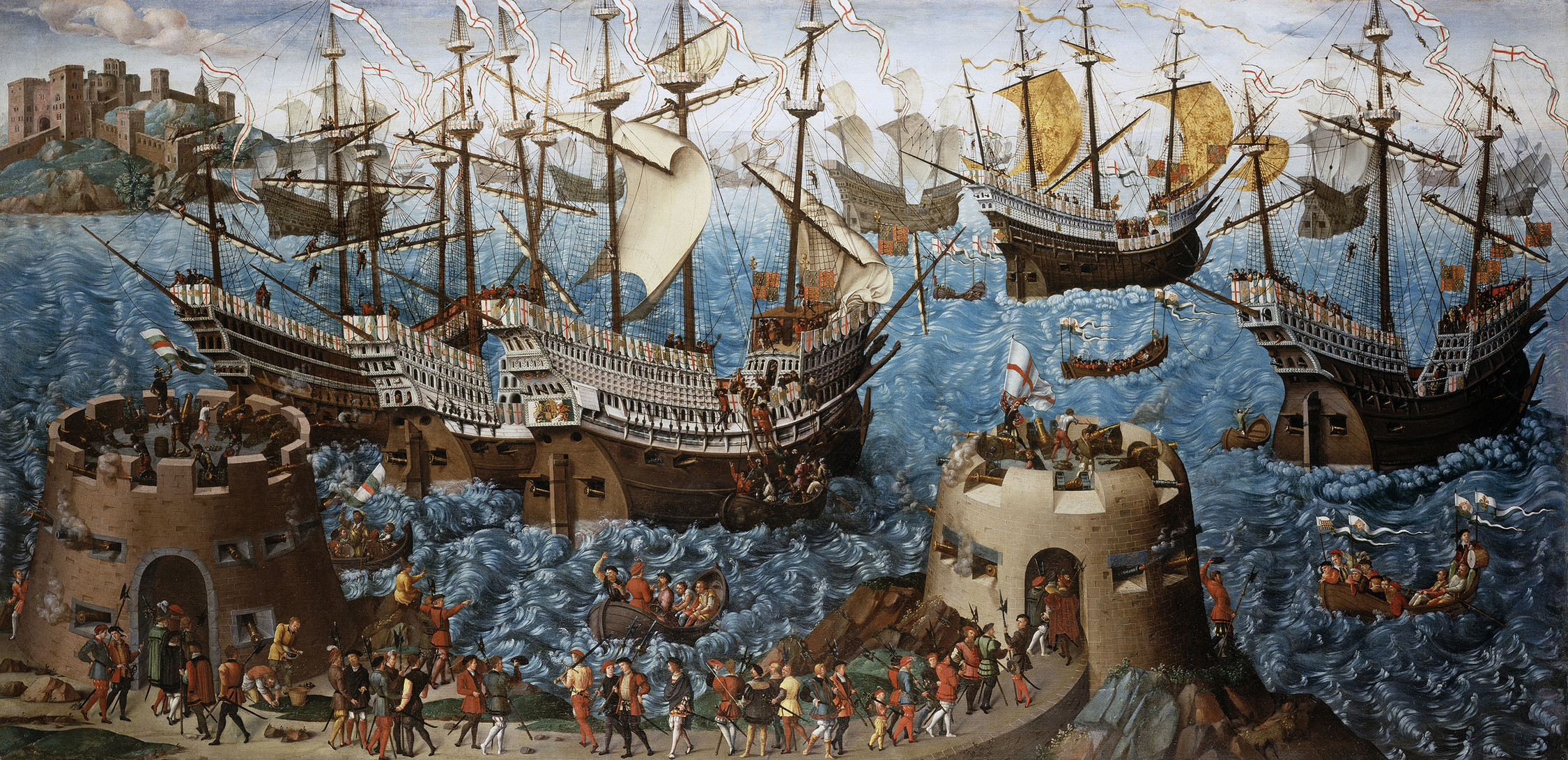
The Embarkation of Henry VIII at Dover

A superb coloured drawing by Hans Holbein the Younger of a ship crowded with drunken lansquenets was perhaps done in preparation for a mural in London. This adopts the low viewpoint typical of the ship portrait.

Pieter Bruegel the Elder is famous for his development of genre painting scenes of peasant life, but also painted a number of marine subjects, including Landscape with the Fall of Icarus (c. 1568); the original is now recognised as lost, and the painting in the Royal Museums of Fine Arts of Belgium in Brussels is now seen as a good early copy of Bruegel's original. He also painted a large Naval Battle in the Gulf of Naples, of 1560, Galleria Doria-Pamphilj, Rome, and a small but dramatic late shipwreck scene. A larger storm scene in Vienna, once regarded as his, is now attributed to Joos de Momper. Such subjects were taken up by his successors, including his sons.

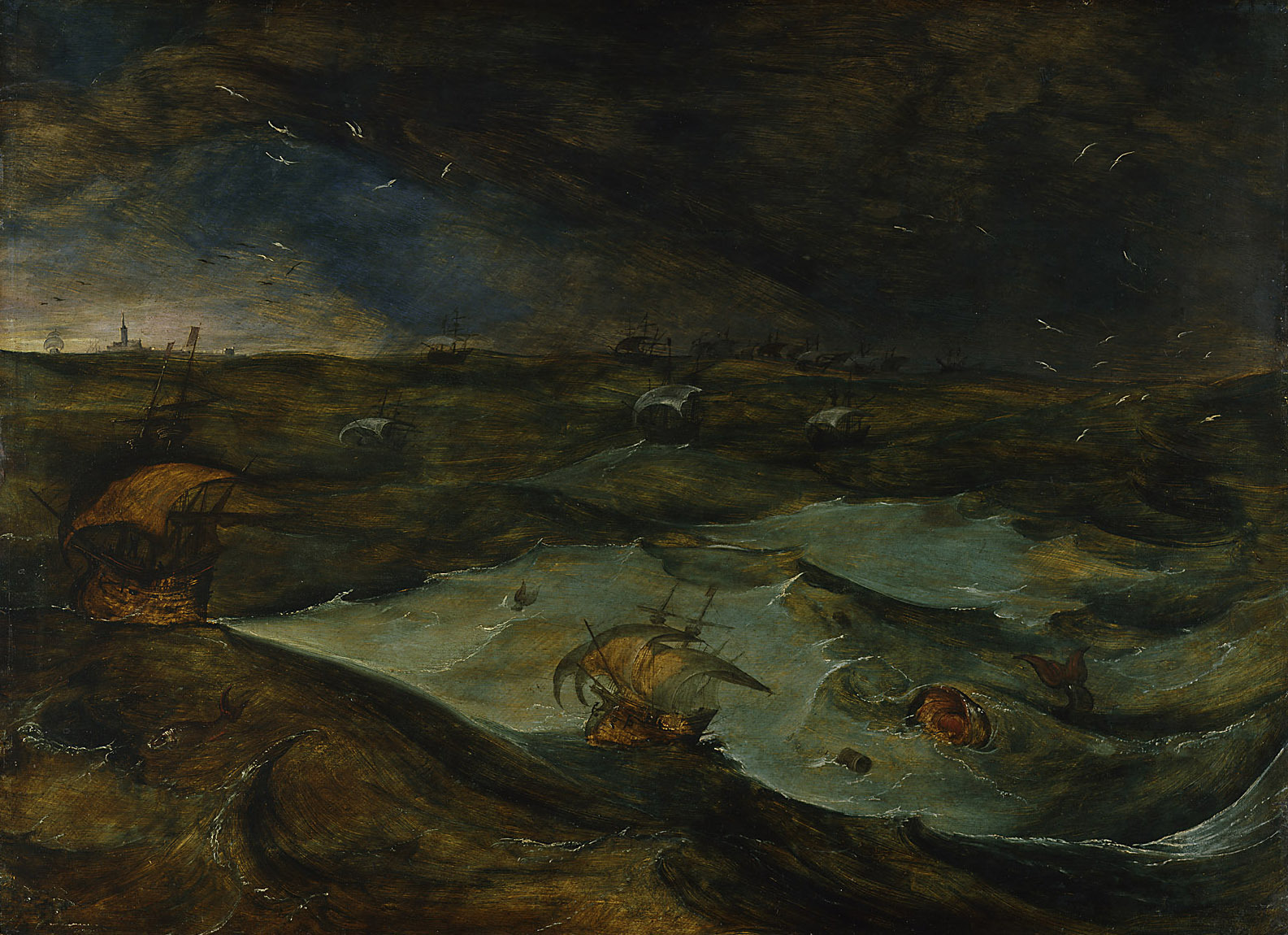
Storm c. 1568, now attributed to Joos de Momper.

The highly picturesque and historically useful Anthony Roll was a luxury illuminated manuscript inventory of the ships of the Royal Navy prepared for Henry VIII in the 1540s. However it is neither very visually accurate nor artistically accomplished, having perhaps been illustrated by the official concerned. As in France, 16th-century English paintings of elaborate royal embarkations and similar occasions are formulaic, if often impressive. Most used Netherlandish artists, as did representations in prints of the defeat of the Spanish Armada in 1588. The Virgin of the Navigators is a Spanish work of the 1530s with a group of ships at anchor, presumably in the New World, protected by the Virgin.

Mannerism in both Italy and the North began to paint fantastic tempests with gigantic waves and lightning-filled skies, which had not been attempted before but were to return into fashion at intervals over the following centuries. As naval warfare became more prominent from the late 16th century, there was an increased demand for works depicting it, which were to remain a staple of maritime painting until the 20th century, pulling the genre in the direction of history painting, with an emphasis on the correct and detailed depiction of the vessels, just as other trends pulled in the direction of increasingly illusionist and subtle effects in the treatment of the sea and weather, paralleling those of landscape painting. Many artists could paint both sorts of subject, but others specialized in one or the other. However at this date seascapes showing a large portion of sea and with no vessels at all were very rare.

== Maritime painting of the Dutch Golden Age ==
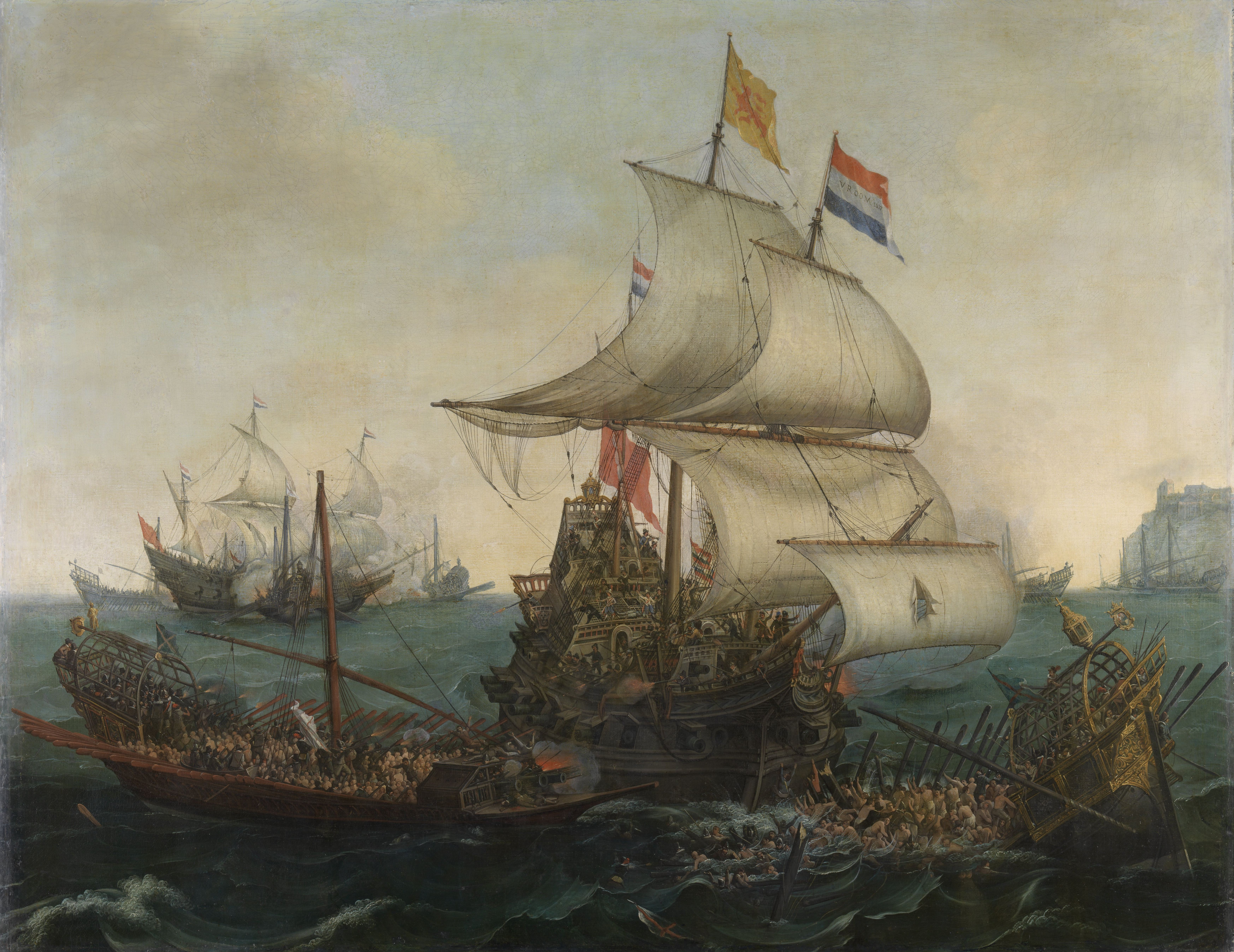
Hendrick Cornelisz Vroom, 1617, Dutch Ships Ramming Spanish Galleys off the Flemish Coast in October 1602

The Dutch Republic relied on fishing and trade by sea for its exceptional wealth, had naval wars with Britain and other nations during the period, and was criss-crossed by rivers and canals. Pictures of sea battles told the stories of the Dutch States Navy at the peak of its glory, though today it is usually the "calms", or more tranquil scenes that are highly estimated. It is therefore no surprise that the genre of maritime painting was enormously popular in Dutch Golden Age painting, and taken to new heights in the period by Dutch artists. As with landscapes, the move from the artificial elevated view typical of earlier marine painting to a low viewpoint was a crucial step, made by the first great Dutch marine specialist Hendrick Cornelisz Vroom.

More often than not, even small ships fly the Dutch tricolour, and many vessels can be identified as naval or one of the many other government ships. Many pictures included some land, with a beach or harbour viewpoint, or a view across an estuary. Other artists specialized in river scenes, from the small pictures of Salomon van Ruysdael with little boats and reed-banks to the large Italianate landscapes of Aelbert Cuyp, where the sun is usually setting over a wide river. The genre naturally shares much with landscape painting, and in developing the depiction of the sky the two went together; many landscape artists also painted beach and river scenes. Artists probably often had precise models of ships available to help them achieve accurate depictions. Artists included Jan Porcellis, Simon de Vlieger, Jan van de Cappelle, and Hendrick Dubbels.

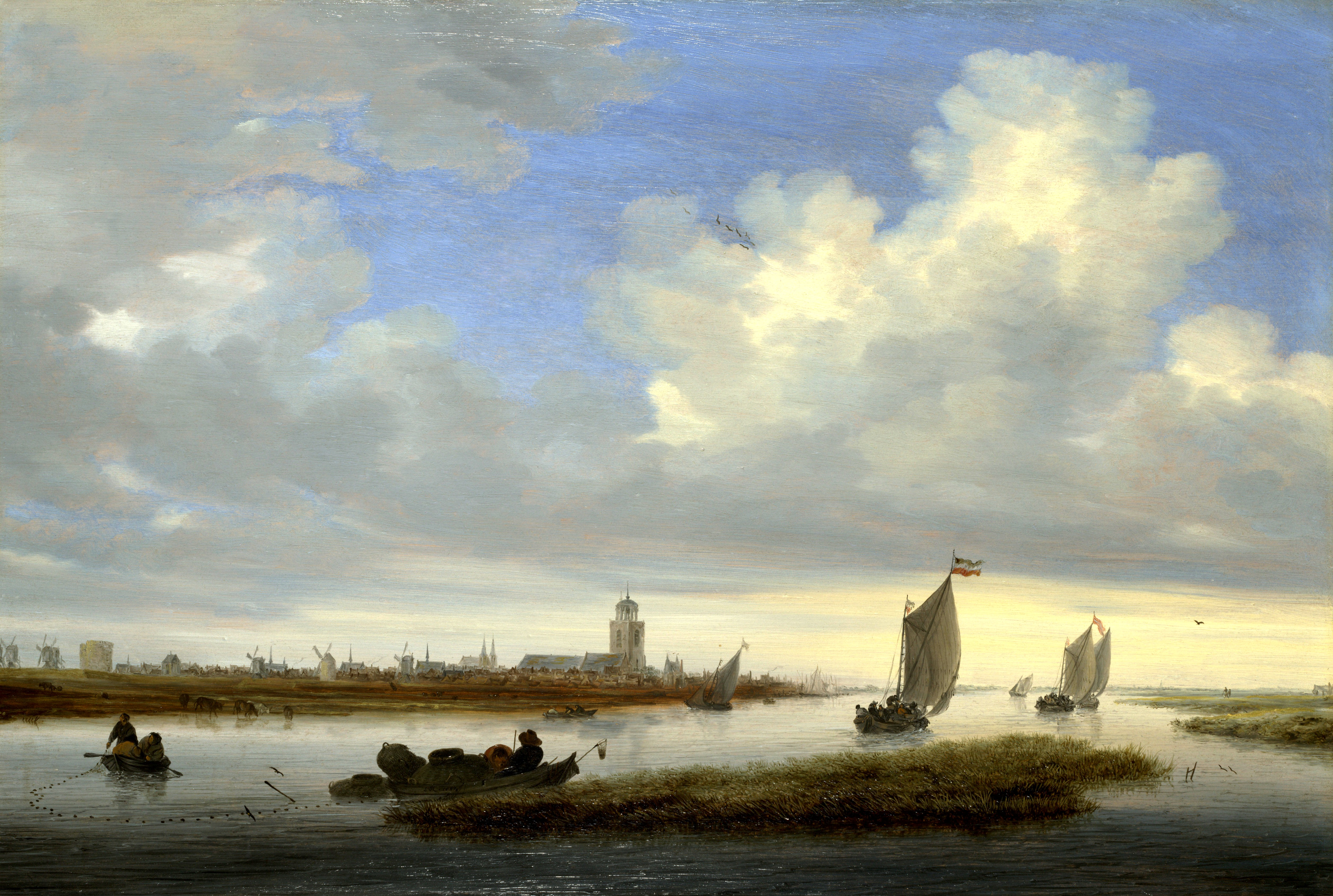
Salomon van Ruysdael, typical View of Deventer Seen from the North-West (1657); an example of the "tonal phase".

The prolific workshop of Willem van de Velde the Elder and his son was the leader of the later decades, tending, as at the beginning of the century, to make the ship the subject, but incorporating the advances of the tonal works of earlier decades where the emphasis had been on the sea and the weather. The Younger van de Velde was very strongly influenced by Simon de Vlieger, whose pupil he was. The Elder van de Velde had first visited England in the 1660s, but both father and son left Holland permanently for London in 1672, leaving the master of heavy seas, the German-born Ludolf Bakhuizen, as the leading artist in Amsterdam. Reinier Nooms, who had been a sailor and signed his works Zeeman ("seaman"), specialized in highly accurate battle scenes and ship portraits, with some interest also in effects of light and weather, and it was his style that was to be followed by many later specialized artists. Abraham Storck and Jan Abrahamsz Beerstraaten were other battle specialists. Nooms also painted several scenes of dockyard maintenance and repair operations, which are unusual and of historical interest.

The tradition of marine painting continued in the Flemish part of the Netherlands, but was much less prominent, and took longer to shake off the Mannerist style of shipwrecks amid fantastic waves. Most paintings were small zeekens, whereas the Dutch painted both large and small works. The leading artist was Bonaventura Peeters.

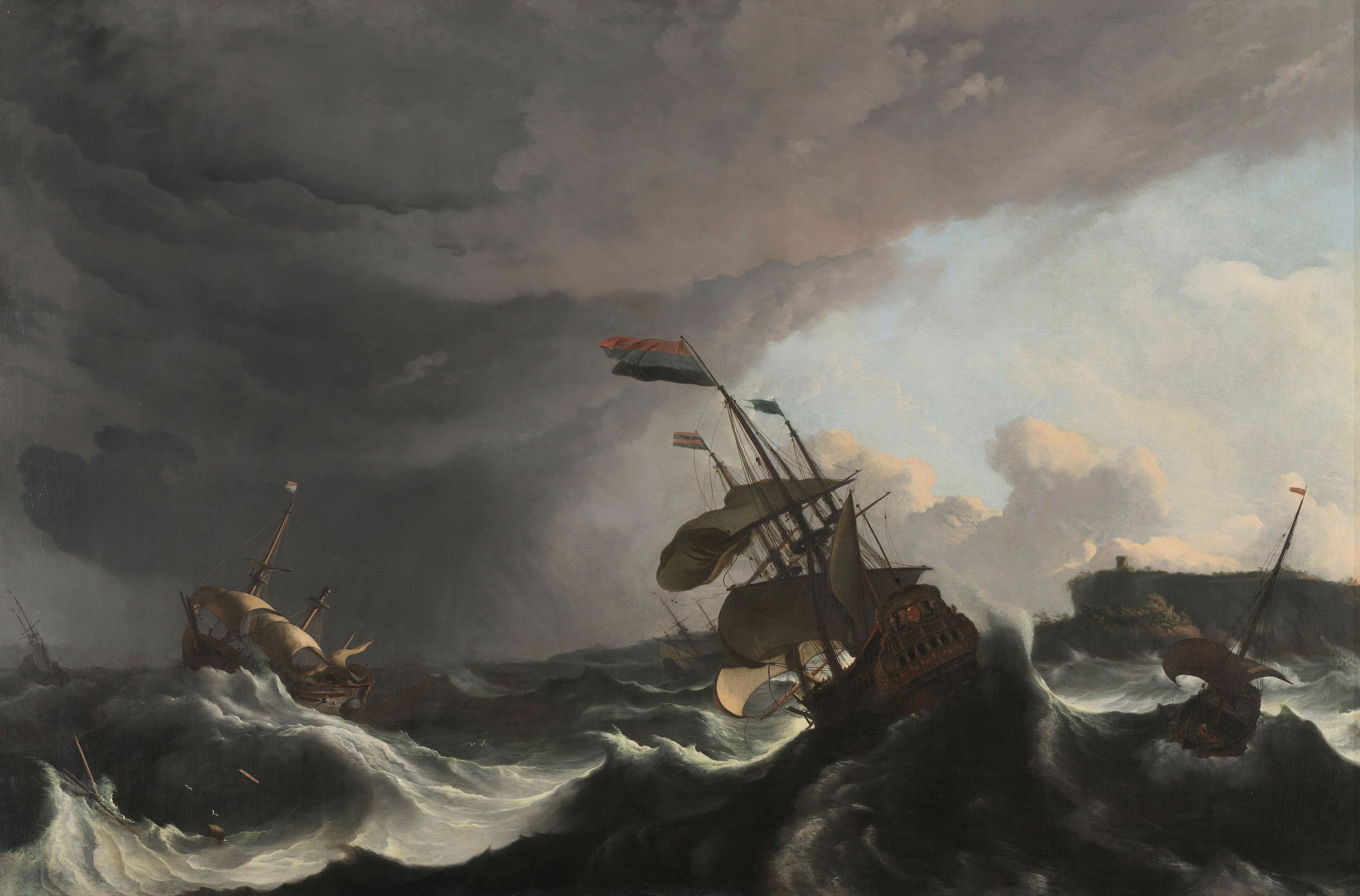
Ludolf Bakhuizen, Dutch warships in trouble off Gibraltar, a real incident of 1690

The Dutch style was exported to other nations by various artists who emigrated, as well as mere emulation by foreign artists. The most important emigrants were the leading Amsterdam marine artists, the father and son Willem van de Velde. Having spent decades chronicling Dutch naval conflicts with England, after the collapse of the art market in the disastrous rampjaar of 1672, they accepted an invitation from the English court to move to London, and spent the rest of their lives painting the Anglo-Dutch wars from the other side. Artists loosely said to have "followed" their style include Isaac Sailmaker, although he was a much earlier Dutch emigrant who had preceded their arrival in England by at least 20 years, and whose style is very different from theirs; as well as Peter Monamy, whose style derives from numerous marine painters besides the van de Veldes, such as Nooms, Peeters and Bakhuizen; and several others, such as Thomas Baston and the Vale brothers, who painted in the native English tradition.

Increasingly, marine art was already mostly left to specialists, with rare exceptions like Rembrandt's powerful The Storm on the Sea of Galilee of 1633, his only true seascape. Van Dyck made some fine drawings of the English coast from boats off Rye, apparently when waiting for his ship to the continent, but never produced any paintings. Some of Rubens's paintings involve the sea and ships, but are so extravagant and stylised that they can hardly be called marine art. However Claude Lorrain developed an influential type of harbour scene, usually with a view out to a sea with a rising or setting sun, and extravagant classical buildings rising on both sides of the channel. This elaborated on a tradition of Italianate harbour scenes by Northern artists (Italian ones took little interest in such scenes) that goes back at least as far as Paul Bril and was especially popular in Flanders, with Bonaventura Peeters and Hendrik van Minderhout, an emigrant from Rotterdam, as the leading exponents there, and Jan Baptist Weenix in the Republic.

== 18th century ==
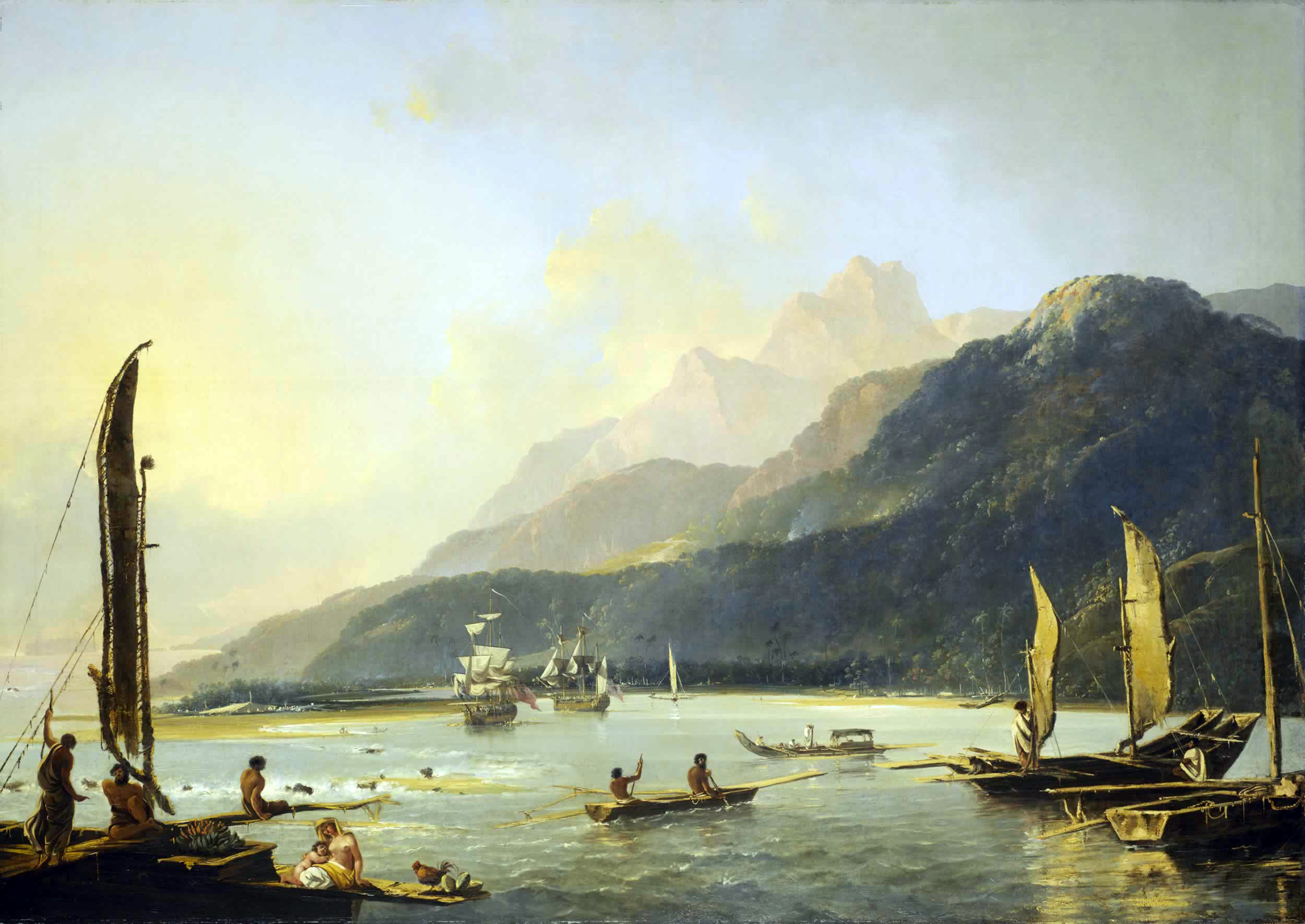
William Hodges, The Resolution and Adventure in Matavai Bay (Tahiti), 1776.

The century supplied an abundance of military actions to depict, much of them fought between the British and French navies. There were a considerable number of very accomplished specialist artists in several countries, who continued to develop the Dutch style of the previous century, sometimes in a rather formulaic manner, with carefully accurate depictions of ships. This was insisted on for the many paintings commissioned by captains, ship-owners and others with nautical knowledge, and many of the artists had nautical experience themselves. For example, Nicholas Pocock had risen to be master of a merchantman, learning to draw while at sea, and as official marine painter to the king was present at a major sea battle, the Glorious First of June in 1794, on board the frigate HMS Pegasus. Thomas Buttersworth had served as a seaman in several actions up to 1800. The Frenchman Ambroise Louis Garneray, mainly active as a painter in the following century, was an experienced sailor, and the accuracy of his paintings of whaling is praised by the narrator in Herman Melville's Moby Dick, who knew them only from prints. At the bottom end of the market, ports in many European countries by now had "pierhead artists" at the docks, who would paint cheap ship portraits that were typically fairly accurate as to the features and rigging of the ship, which was demanded by sailor customers, but very formulaic in general artistic terms.

The Venetian artists Canaletto and Francesco Guardi painted vedute in which the canals, gondolas and other small craft, and lagoon of Venice are most often prominent features; many of Guardi's later works barely show land at all, and Canaletto's works from his period in England also mostly feature a river and boats. Both produced a large quantity of work, not all of the same quality, but their best paintings handle water and light superbly, though in very different moods, as Canaletto's world is always bright and sunny, where Guardi's is often overcast, if not misty and gloomy.

The Shipwreck, 1772, by Claude Joseph Vernet

Naval cadets were now encouraged to learn drawing, as new coastal charts made at sea were expected to be accompanied by "coastal profiles", or sketches of the land behind, and artists were appointed to teach the subject at naval schools, including John Thomas Serres, who published Liber Nauticus, and Instructor in the Art of Marine Drawings in 1805/06. Professional artists were now often sent on voyages of exploration, like William Hodges (1744–1797) on James Cook's second voyage to the Pacific Ocean, and exotic coastal scenes were popular as both paintings and prints.

Prints had become as significant as a source of income as the original painting for some artists, for example the much-engraved French painter Claude Joseph Vernet (1714–1789), who both revived something of the spirit of the Mannerist tempest, and looked forward to Romanticism, in his large and extremely dramatic scenes of storms and shipwrecks. He was also commissioned by the French government to produce a series of views of French harbours, with the strange result that many of his works showing merchant shipping are very violent, and most showing naval vessels very tranquil. He also developed a type of large Claudeian harbour-scene, at sunset and with a generalized Mediterranean setting, which were imitated by many artists. Another early Romantic French, or at least Alsatian-Swiss, artist was Philip James de Loutherbourg (1740–1812), who spent most of his career in England, where he was commissioned by the government to produce a number of works depicting naval victories. Watson and the Shark is a famous marine history subject of 1778 by John Singleton Copley.

== Romantic Age to present ==
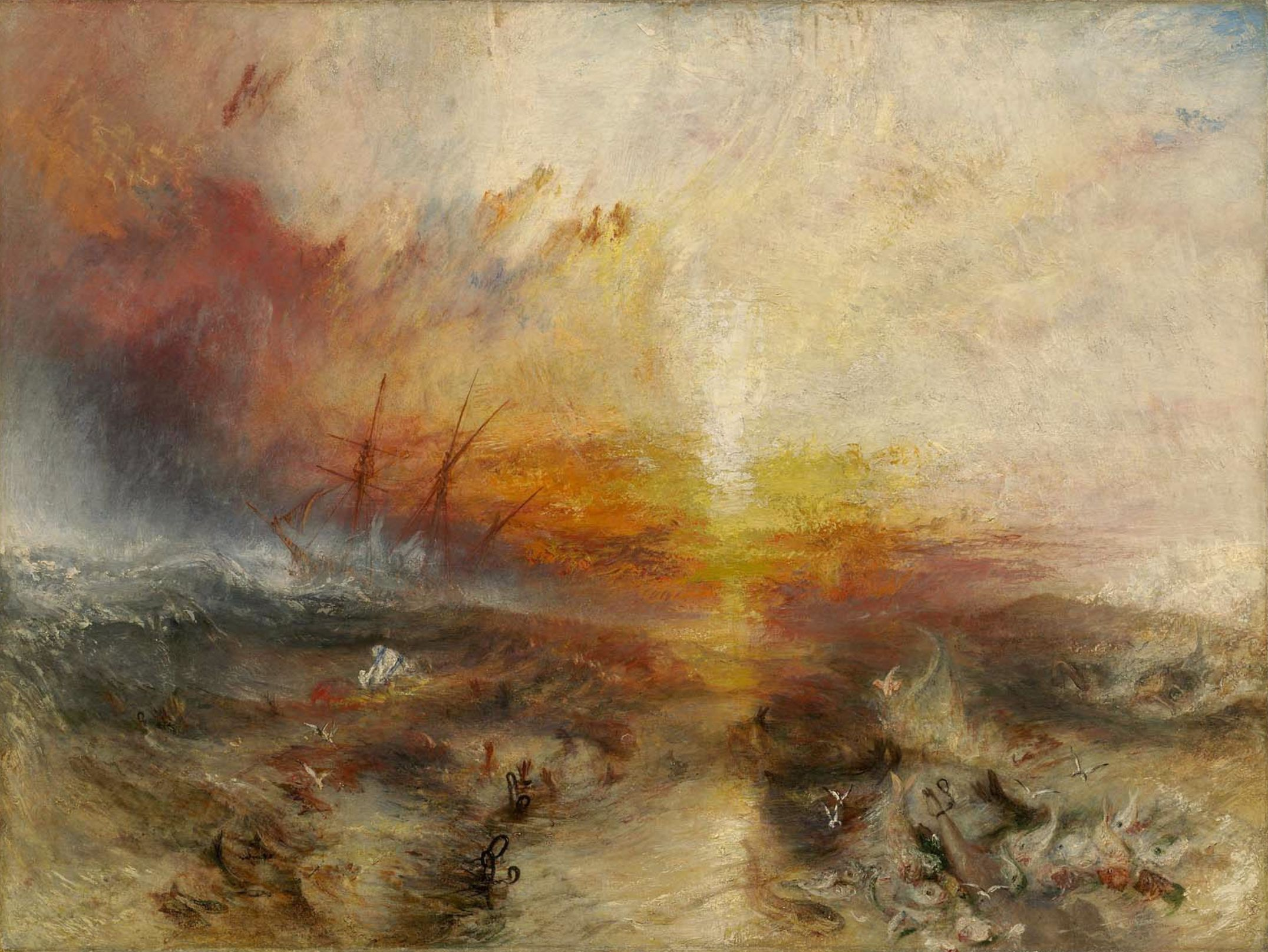
J. M. W. Turner, The Slave Ship, 1840

The Romantic period saw marine painting rejoin the mainstream of art, although many specialized painters continued to develop the "ship portrait" genre. Antoine Roux and sons dominated maritime art in Marseille throughout the 1800s with detailed portraits of ships and maritime life. Arguably the greatest icon of Romanticism in art is Théodore Géricault's The Raft of the Medusa (1819), and for J. M. W. Turner painting the sea was a lifelong obsession. The Medusa is a radical type of history painting, while Turner's works, even when given history subjects, are essentially approached as landscapes. His public commission The Battle of Trafalgar (1824) was criticised for inaccuracy, and his most personal late works make no attempt at accurate detail, often having lengthy titles to explain what might otherwise seem an unreadable mass of "soapsuds and whitewash", as The Athenaeum described Turner's Snow Storm – Steam-Boat off a Harbour's Mouth making Signals in Shallow Water, and going by the Lead. The Author was in this Storm on the Night the Ariel left Harwich of 1842.

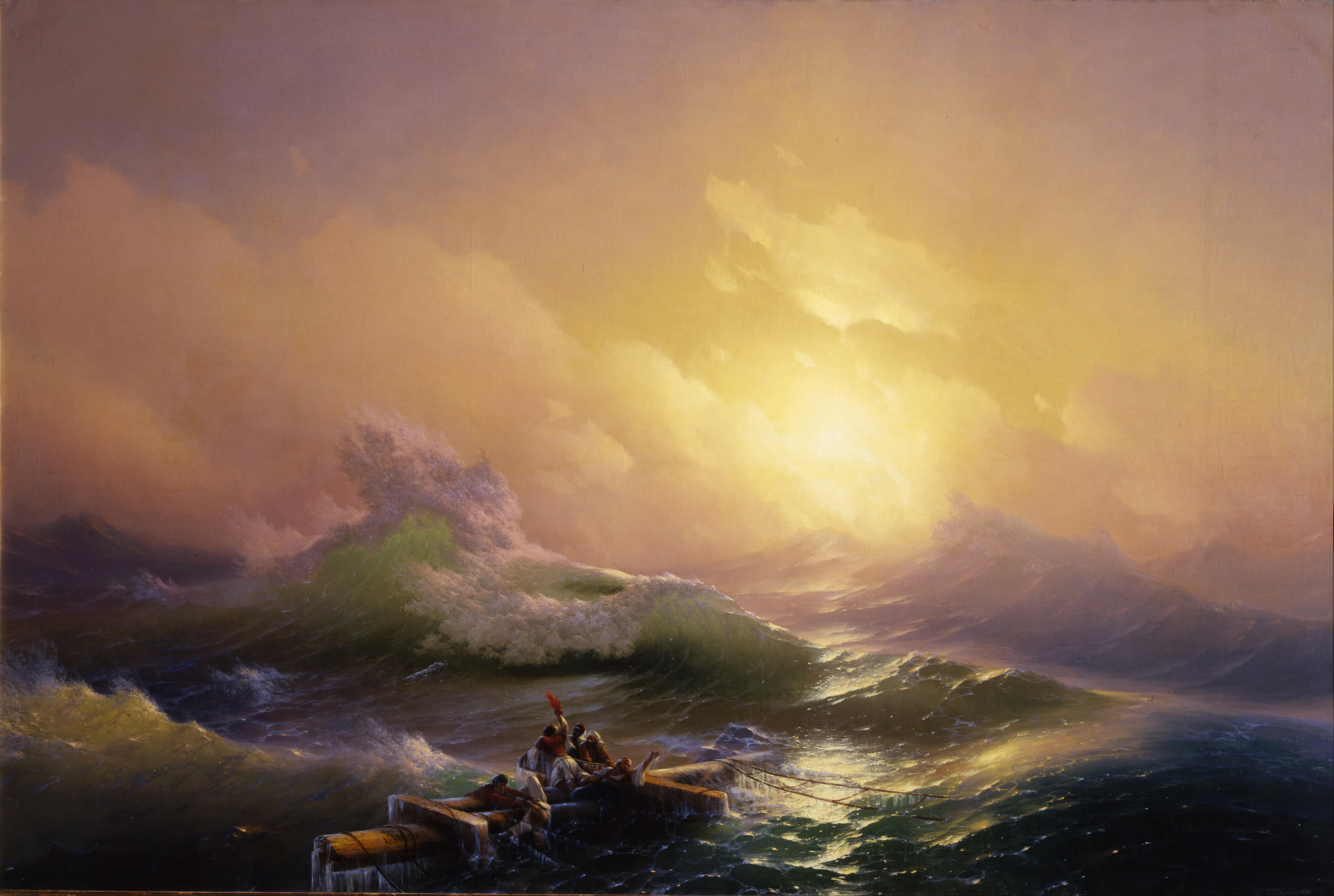
Ivan Aivazovsky, The Ninth Wave, 1850

The new force in painting, the art of Denmark, featured coastal scenes very strongly, with an emphasis on tranquil waters and still, golden light. These influenced the German Caspar David Friedrich, who added an element of Romantic mysticism, as in The Stages of Life (1835); his The Sea of Ice is less typical, showing a polar shipwreck. Ivan Aivazovsky continued the old themes of battles, shipwrecks and storms with a full-blooded Russian Romanticism, as in The Ninth Wave (1850).

River, harbour and coastal scenes, typically with only small boats, were popular with Corot and the Barbizon school, especially Charles-François Daubigny; many of the most famous works of the most important Russian landscapist, Isaac Levitan, featured tranquil lakes and also the huge rivers of Russia, which he and many artists treated as a source of national pride. Gustave Courbet painted a number of scenes of beaches with cliffs and views looking out to sea of waves breaking on a beach, usually with no human figures or craft. During the 1860s Édouard Manet painted a number of paintings depicting important and newsworthy events including his 1864 'marine' painting of the Battle of the Kearsarge and the Alabama, memorializing a sea battle that took place in 1864 during the Civil War in the United States.

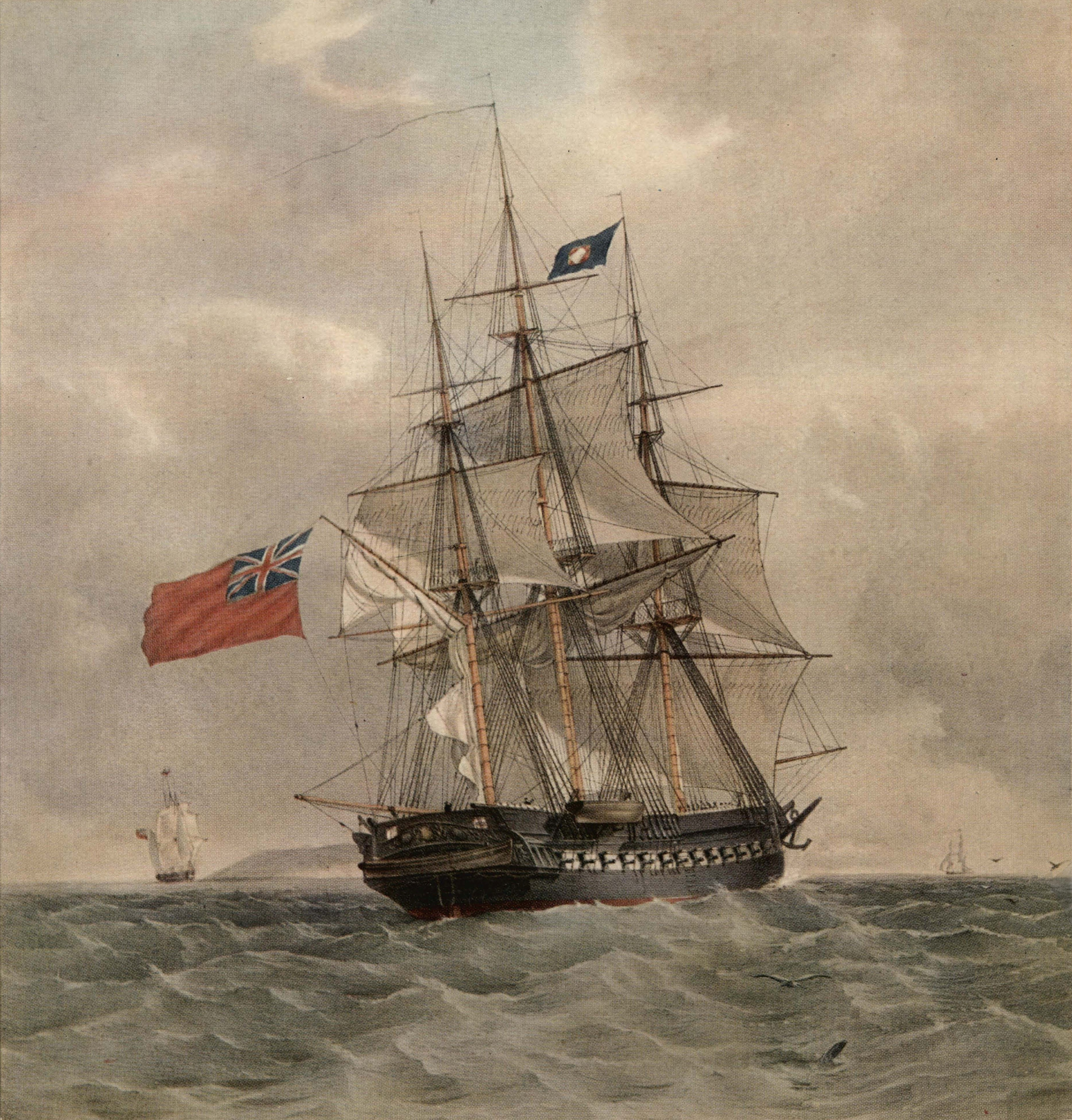
HMS Pomone, a colour lithograph by T. G. Dutton, after a painting by G.F. St.John

The ship portrait genre was taken to America by a number of emigrants, most English like James E. Buttersworth (1817–1894) and Robert Salmon (1775 – c. 1845). The Luminist Fitz Henry Lane (1804–1865) was the earliest of a number of artists who developed American styles based in landscape art; he painted small boats at rest in tranquil small bays. Martin Johnson Heade was a member of the Hudson River School, and painted tranquil scenes, but also threatening storms of alarming blackness. Winslow Homer increasingly specialized in marine scenes with small boats towards the end of the century, often showing boats in heavy swells on the open sea, as in his The Gulf Stream.Thomas Eakins often painted river scenes, including Max Schmitt in a Single Scull (1871). Thomas Goldsworthy Dutton (1820–1891) has the reputation of being one of the finest lithographers of 19th-century nautical scenes and ship portraits.

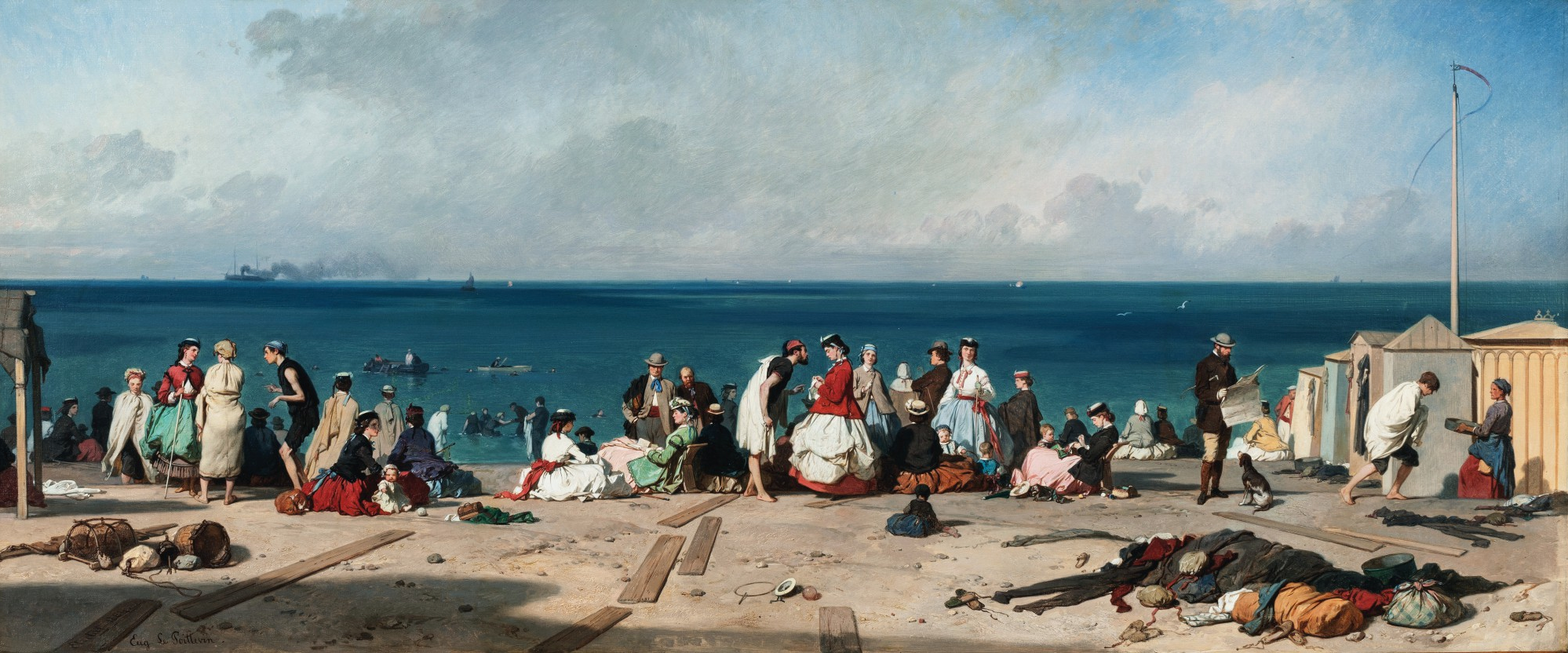
Sea Bathing, the Beach at Étretat by Eugène Lepoittevin, 1864. Figures identified include Guy de Maupassant, in blue cap at left.

Later in the century, as the coast became increasingly regarded as a place of pleasure rather than work, beach scenes and coastal landscapes without any shipping became prominent for the first time, often including cliffs and rock formations, which had earlier been mostly found in scenes of shipwreck. Many later beach scenes became increasingly crowded, as holidaymakers took over the beaches of Europe. Eugène Lepoittevin painted maritime subjects ranging from naval battles and shipwrecks to scenes of fisherman at work and swimmers relaxing at the beach at Étretat in Normandy. Eugène Boudin's scenes of the beaches of north France strike a familiar note to the modern viewer, despite the heavy clothing worn by the ladies sitting on chairs in the sand. The Impressionists painted many scenes of beaches, cliffs and rivers, especially Claude Monet, who often returned to Courbet's themes, as in Stormy Sea in Étretat. It was his Impression, Sunrise (1872), a view over the waters of the harbour at Le Havre, that had given the movement its name. River scenes were very common among the Impressionists, especially by Monet and Alfred Sisley.

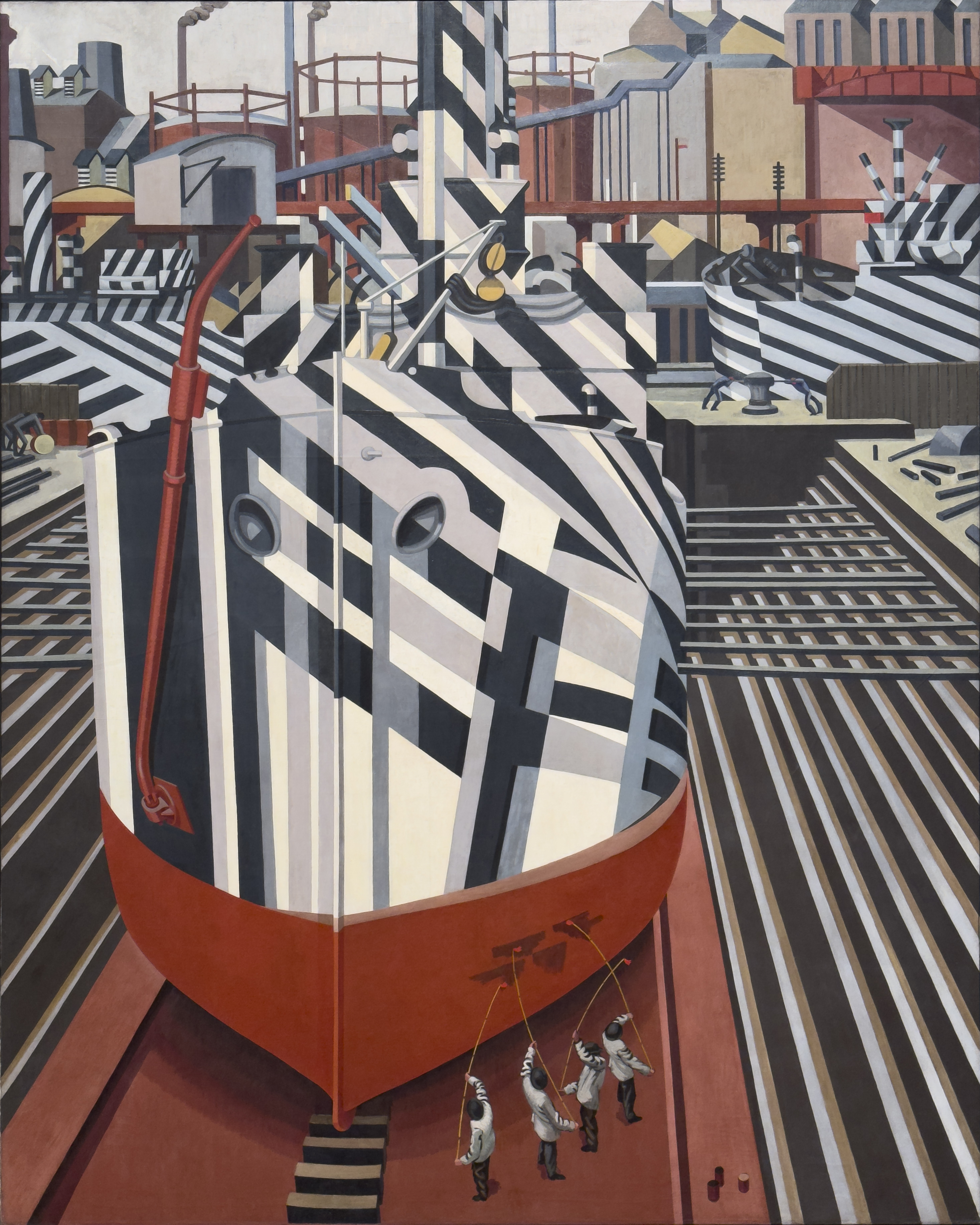
Painting of Dazzle-ships in Drydock at Liverpool, by Edward Wadsworth, 1919

The Spanish painter Joaquín Sorolla painted many beach scenes, typically concentrating on a few figures seen close up, in contrast to the smaller figures of most beach paintings. American artists who painted beaches and shores, typically less populated, include John Frederick Kensett, William Merritt Chase, Jonas Lie, and James Abbott McNeill Whistler, who mainly painted rivers and the canals of Venice. Towards the end of the 19th century, the American painter Albert Pinkham Ryder created moody and darkly visionary early modernist seascapes. The Fauve and Pointilliste groups included fairly tranquil waters in large numbers of their work, as did Edvard Munch in his early paintings. In England the Newlyn School and the naive fisherman-artist Alfred Wallis are worth noting.

The rather traditional British marine artist Sir Norman Wilkinson was during World War I the inventor of dazzle camouflage, by which ships were boldly painted in patterns, achieving results not dissimilar to Vorticism, inspiring the naval ditty: "Captain Schmidt at the periscope / You need not fall or faint / For it’s not the vision of drug or dope / But only the dazzle paint". When the American navy adopted the idea in 1918, Frederick Judd Waugh was put in charge of design.

Specialized marine painters concentrating on ship portraits continue to the present day, with artists such as Montague Dawson (1895–1973), whose works were very popular in reproduction; like many, he found works showing traditional sailing ships more in demand than those of modern vessels. Even in 1838 Turner's The Fighting Temeraire tugged to her last Berth to be broken up, still probably his most famous work, displayed nostalgia for the age of sail. Marine subjects still attract many mainstream artists, and more popular forms of marine art remain enormously popular, as shown by the parodic series of paintings by Vitaly Komar and Alexander Melamid called America's Most Wanted Painting, with variants for several countries, almost all featuring a lakeside view. Marine art was also a specialty of contemporary realist Ann Mikolowski (1940–1999), whose work includes studies of the U.S. Great Lakes and Atlantic coastlines.

=== 19th-century gallery ===
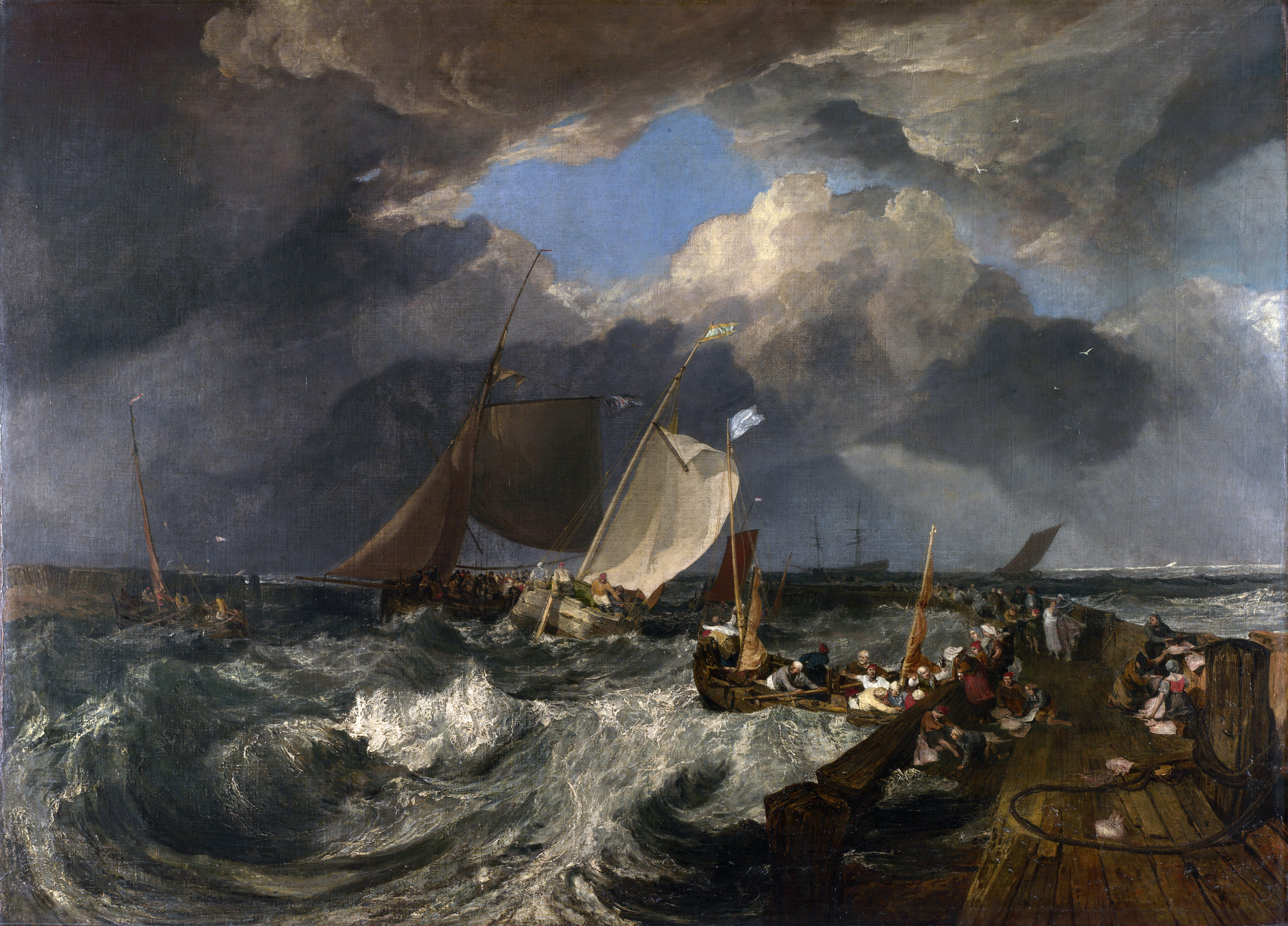
J. M. W. Turner. Calais Pier, 1803

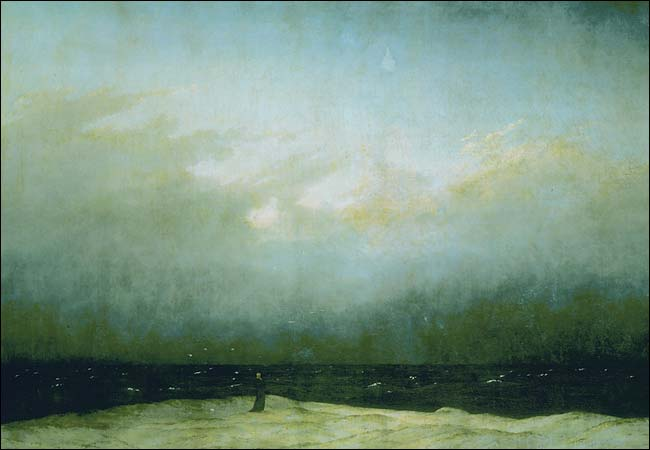
Caspar David Friedrich, The Monk by the Sea, 1809

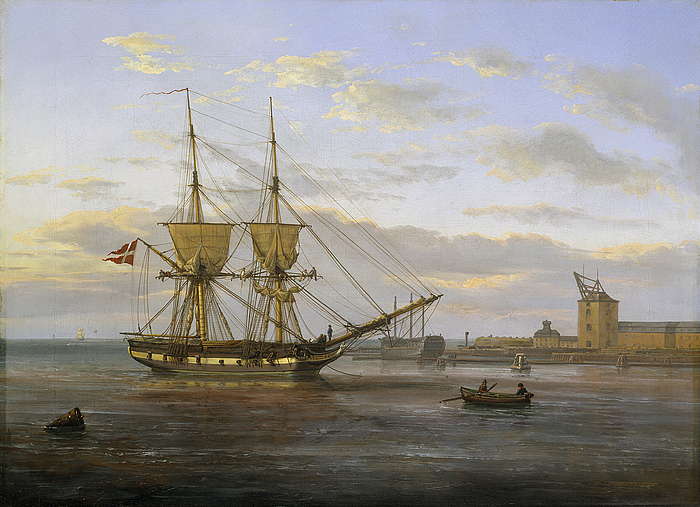
J. C. Dahl, Entrance to Copenhagen, 1830

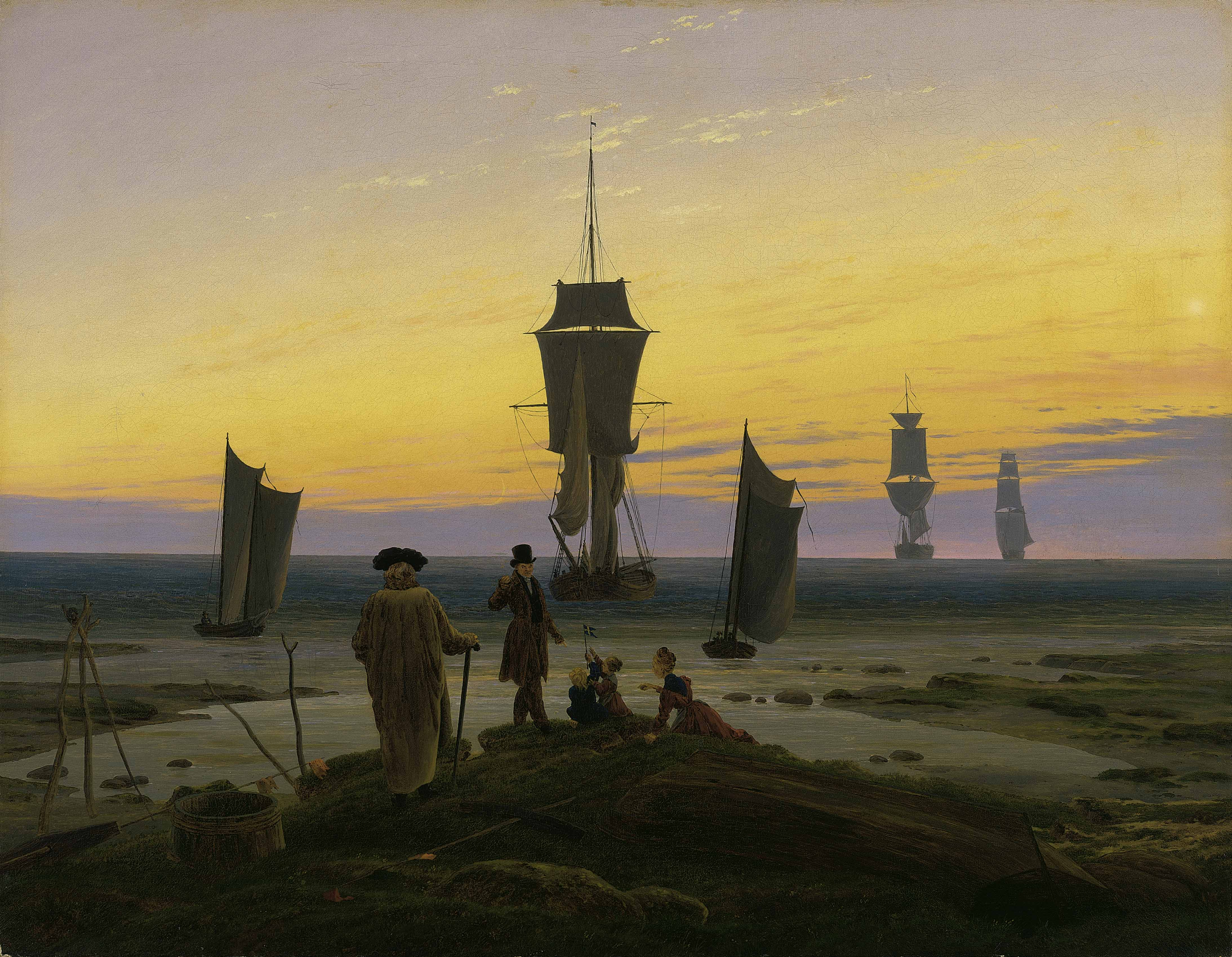
Caspar David Friedrich, The Stages of Life, 1835

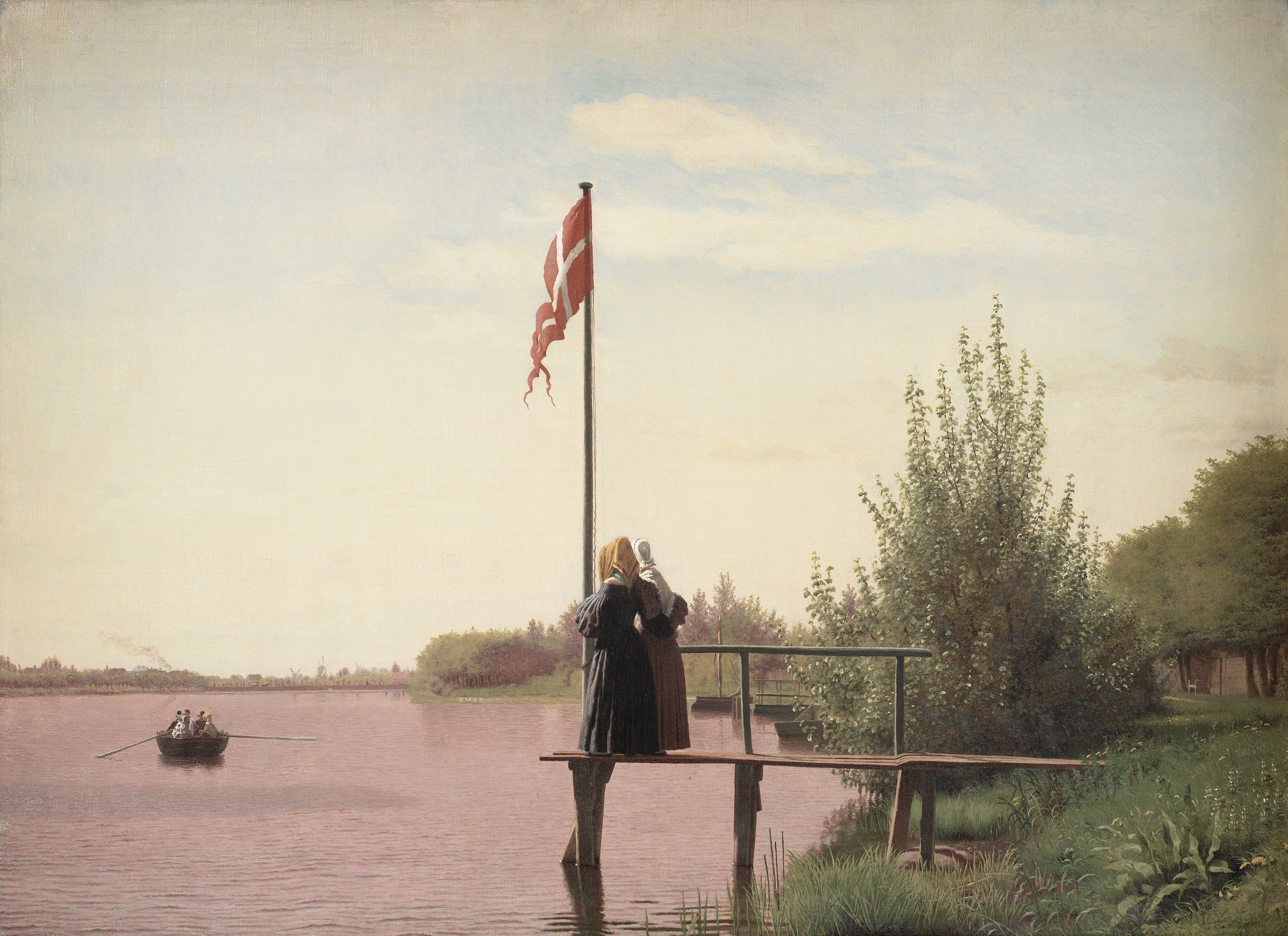
Christen Købke, View of Lake Sortedam, 1838

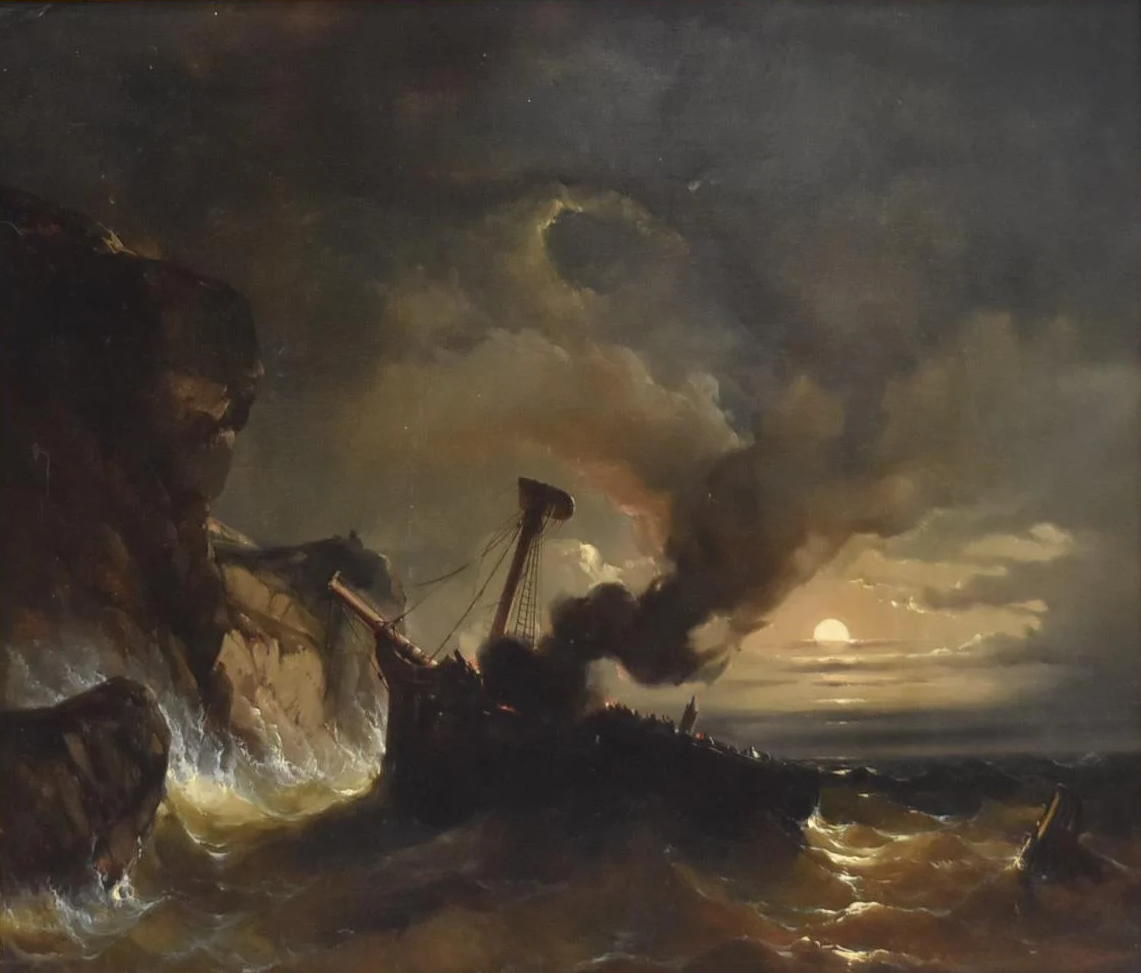
Eugène Lepoittevin, Shipwreck off the Cliffs of Dover at Night with Dover Castle in the Distance, c. 1840

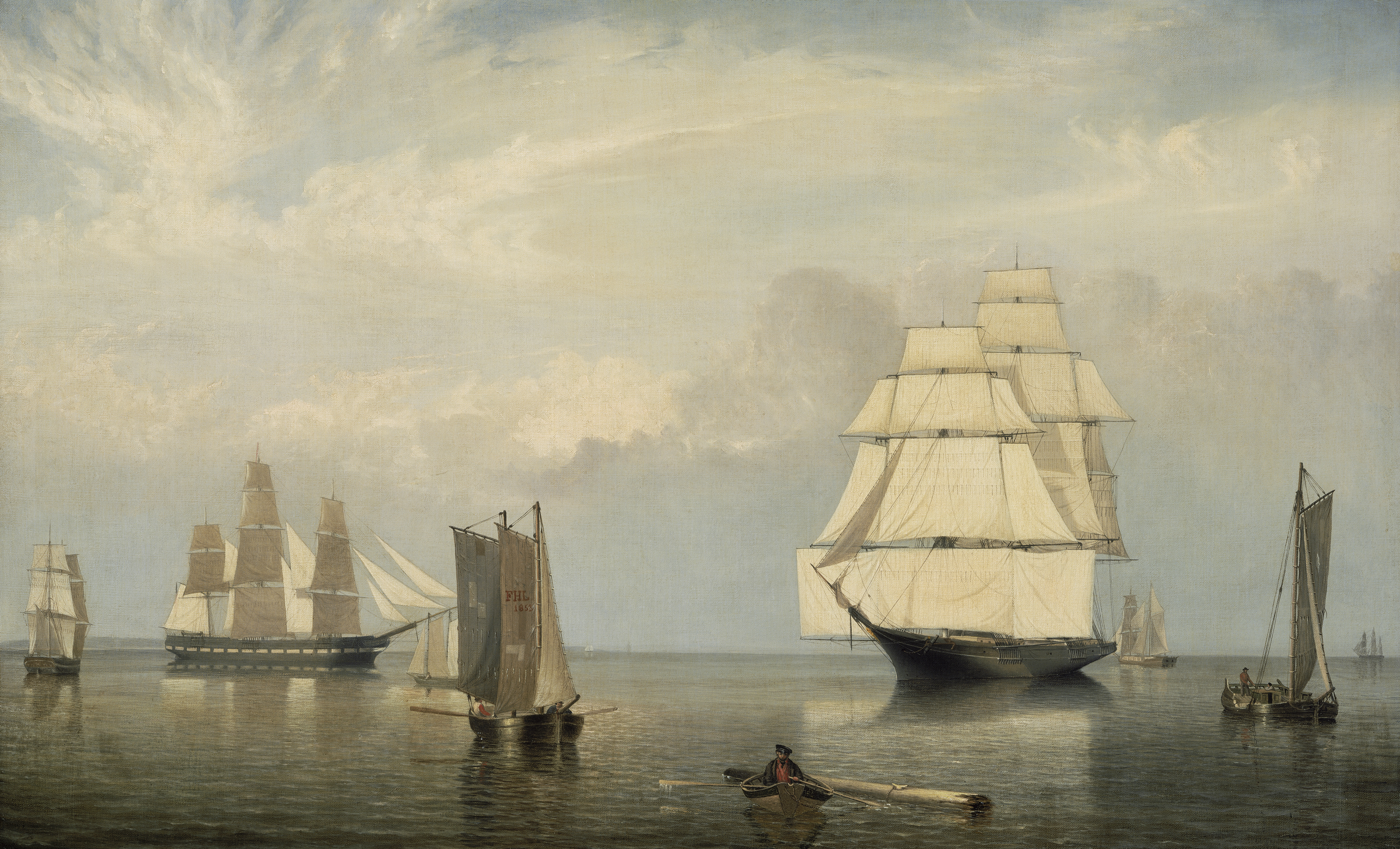
Fitz Henry Lane, Salem Harbor, 1853

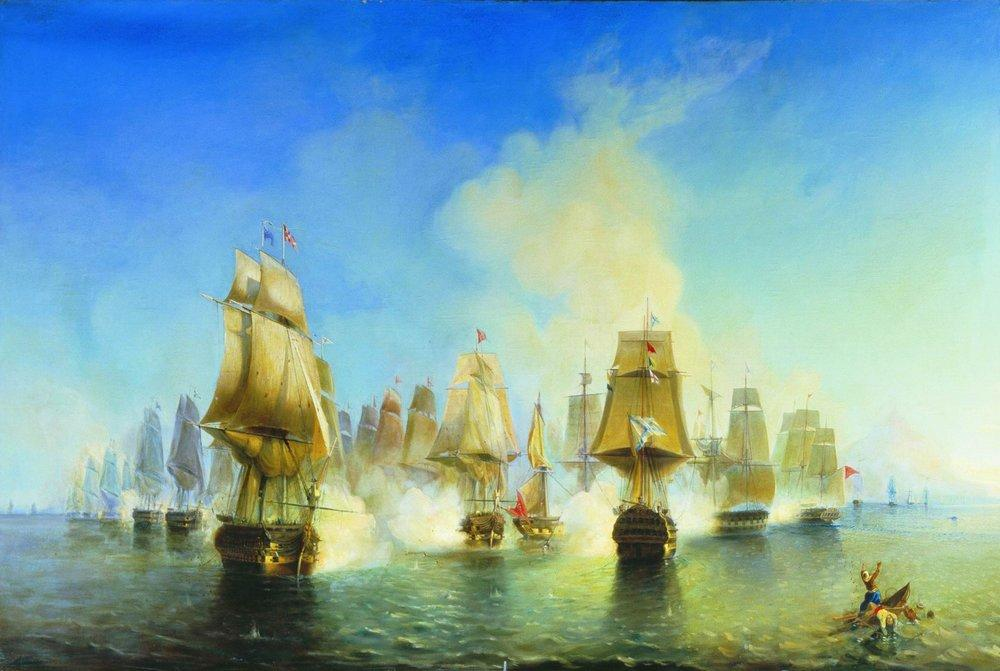
Alexey Bogolyubov, Battle of Athos, 1853

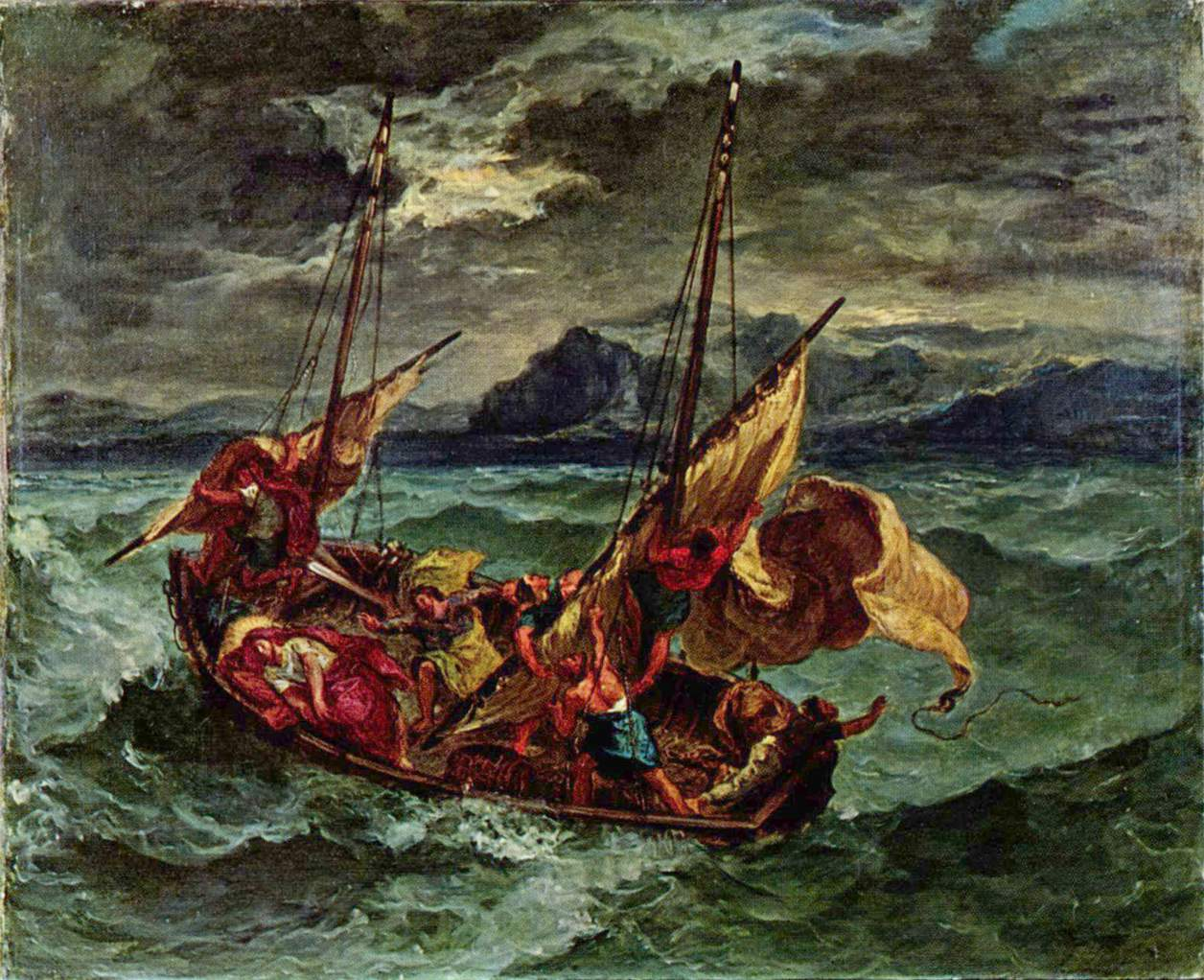
Eugène Delacroix, Christ on the Sea of Galilee, 1854

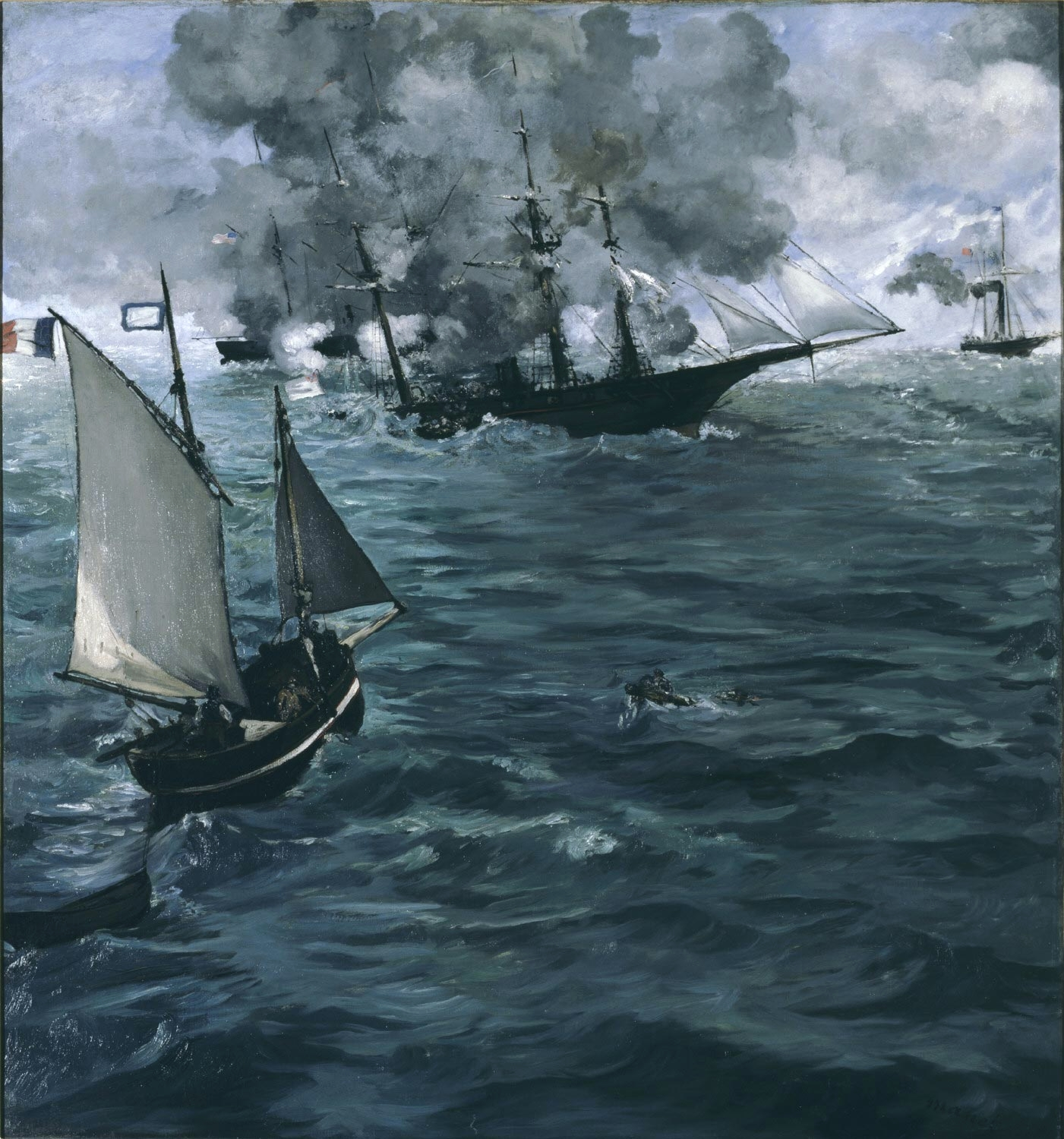
Édouard Manet, Battle of the Kearsarge and the Alabama, 1864

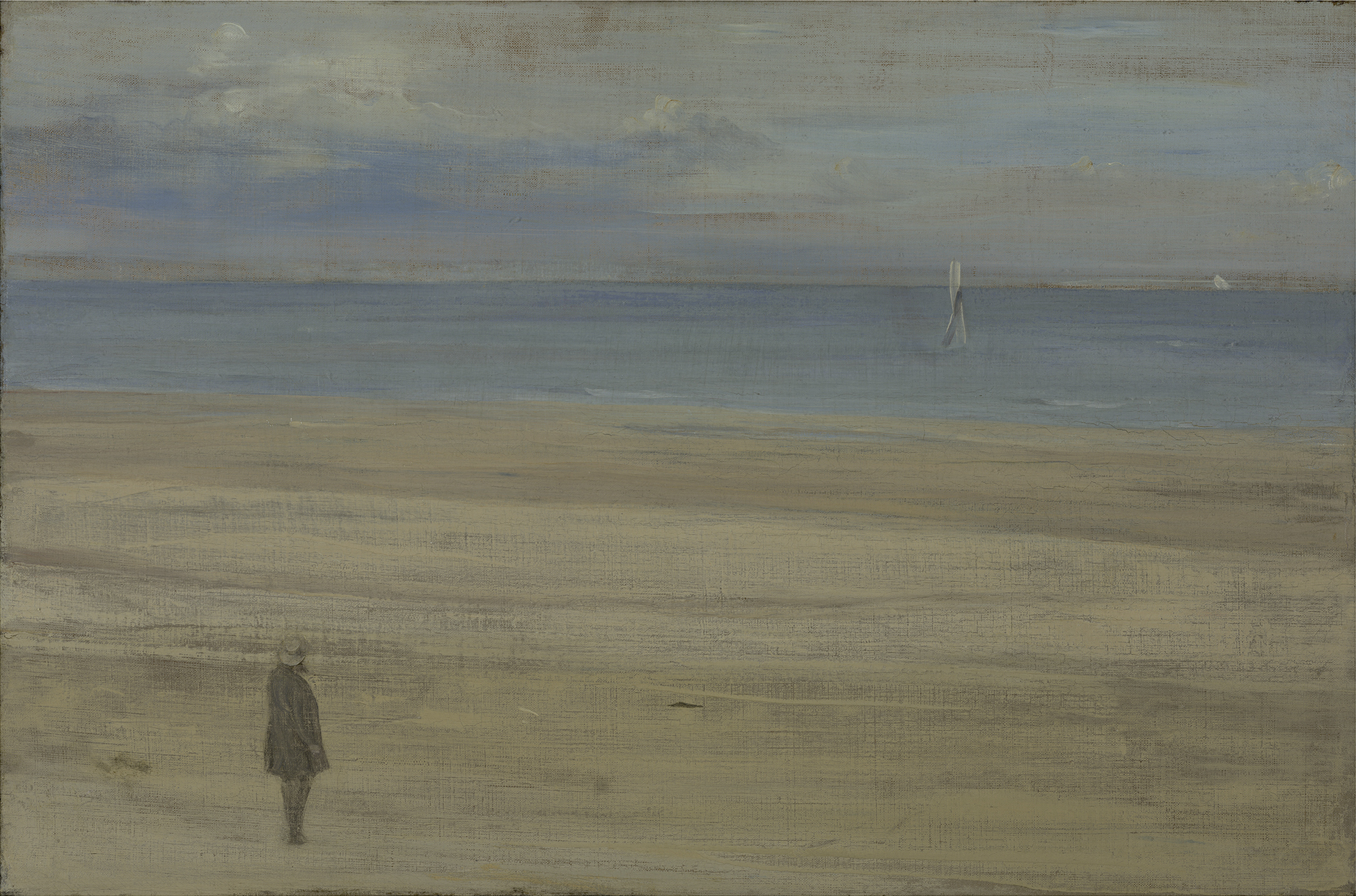
James Abbott McNeill Whistler, Harmony in Blue and Silver:Trouville, 1865

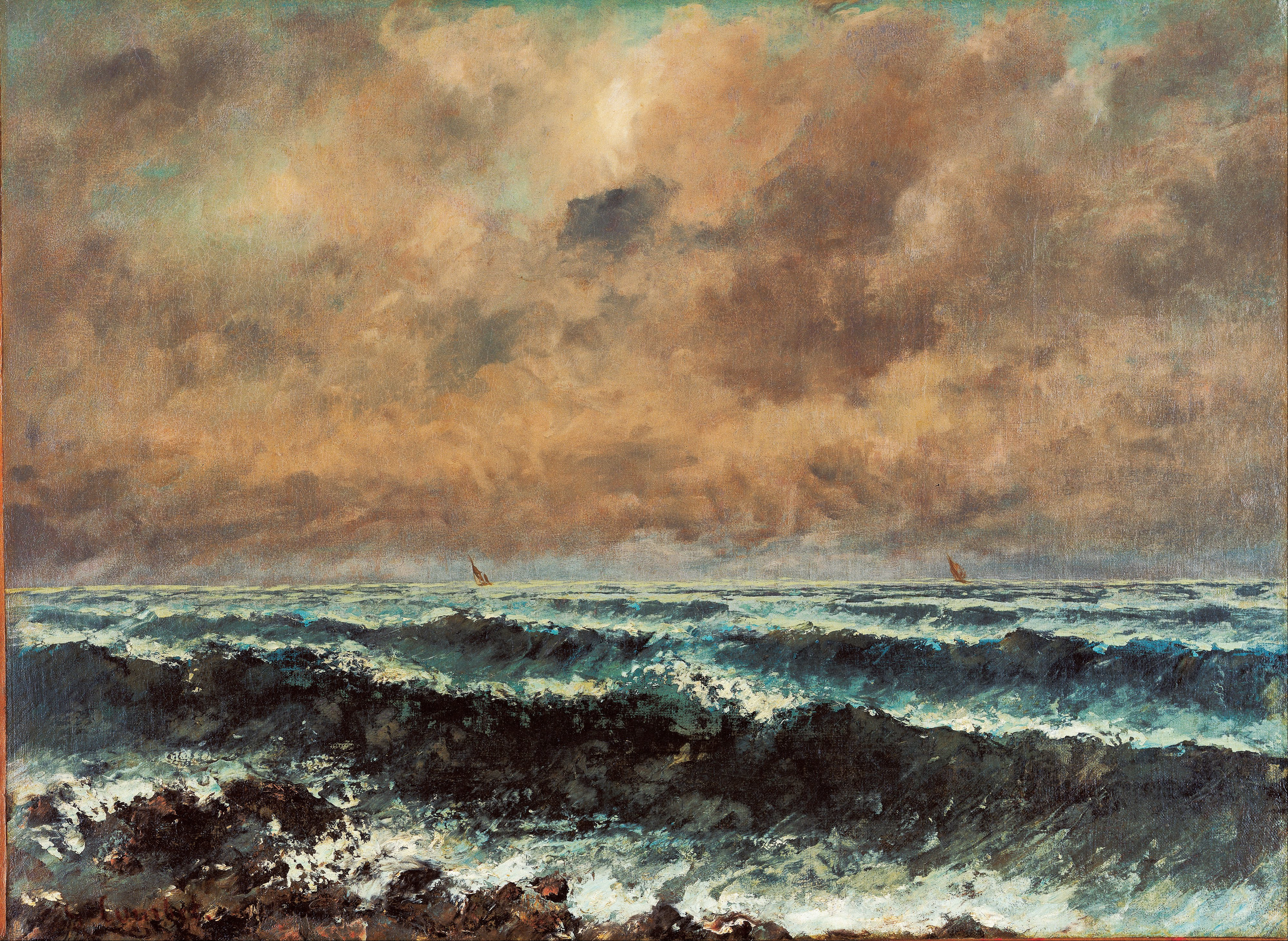
Gustave Courbet, Autumn Sea, 1867

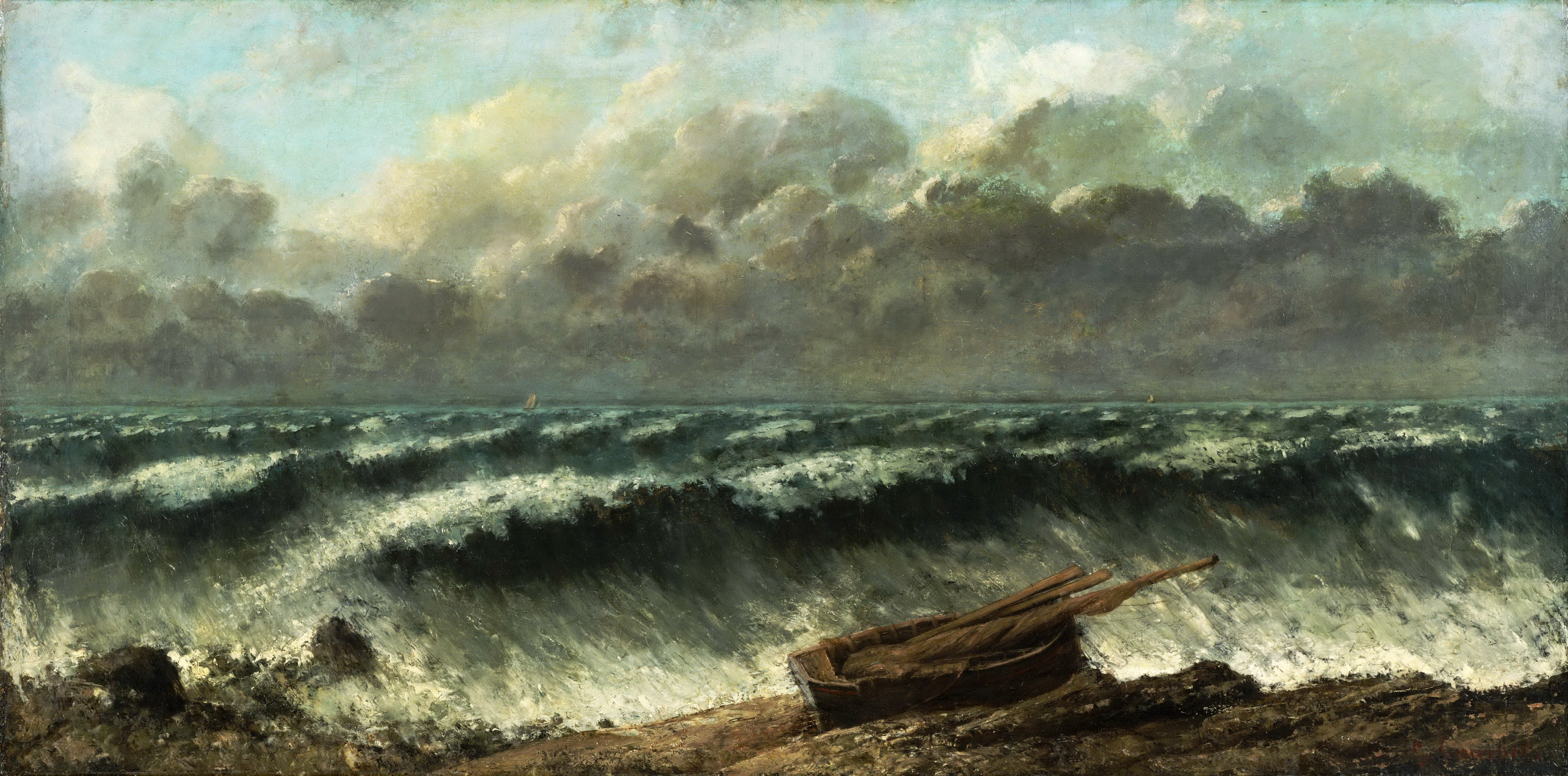
Gustave Courbet, The Waves, 1869

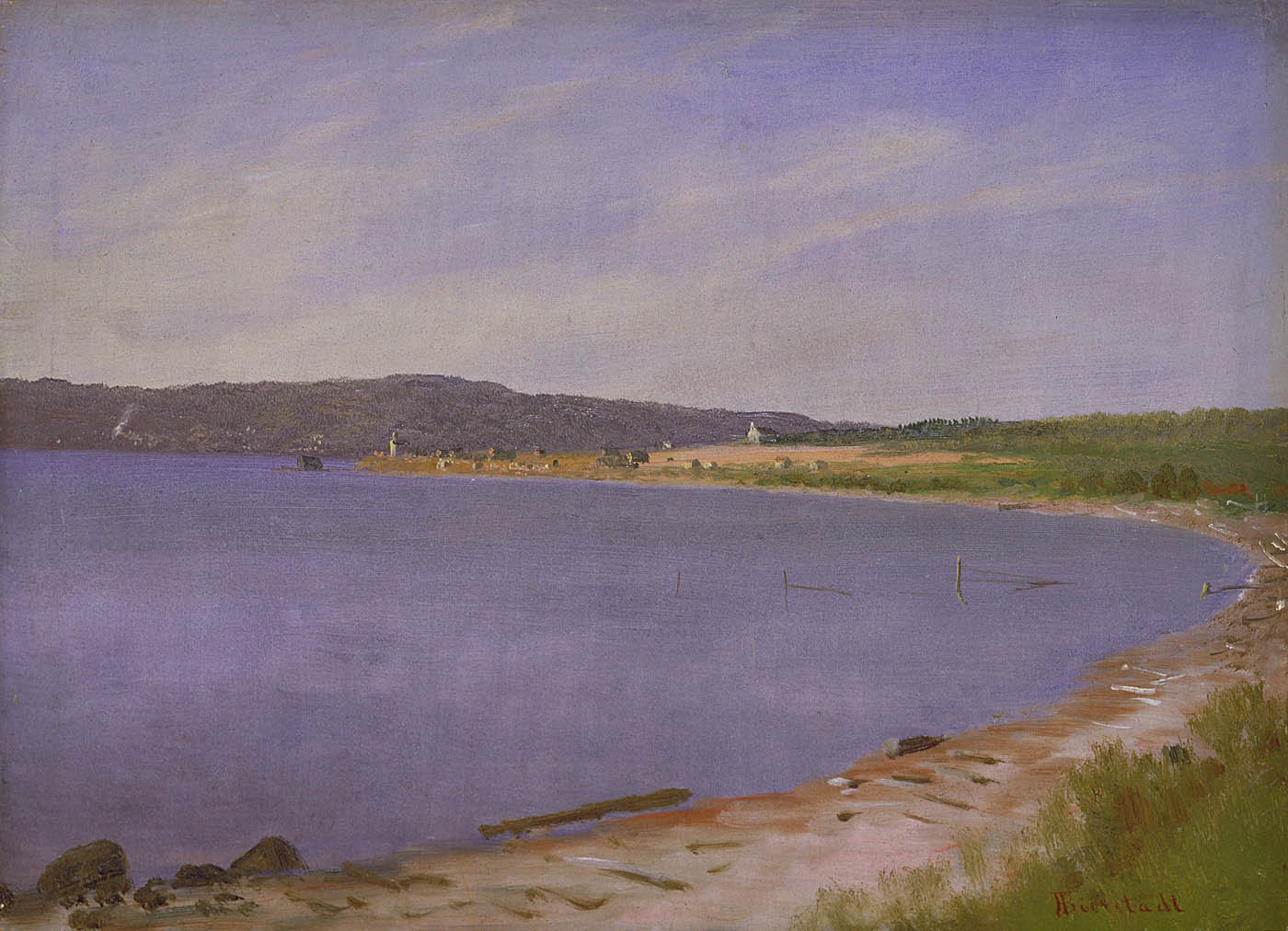
Albert Bierstadt, San Francisco Bay, 1871–1873

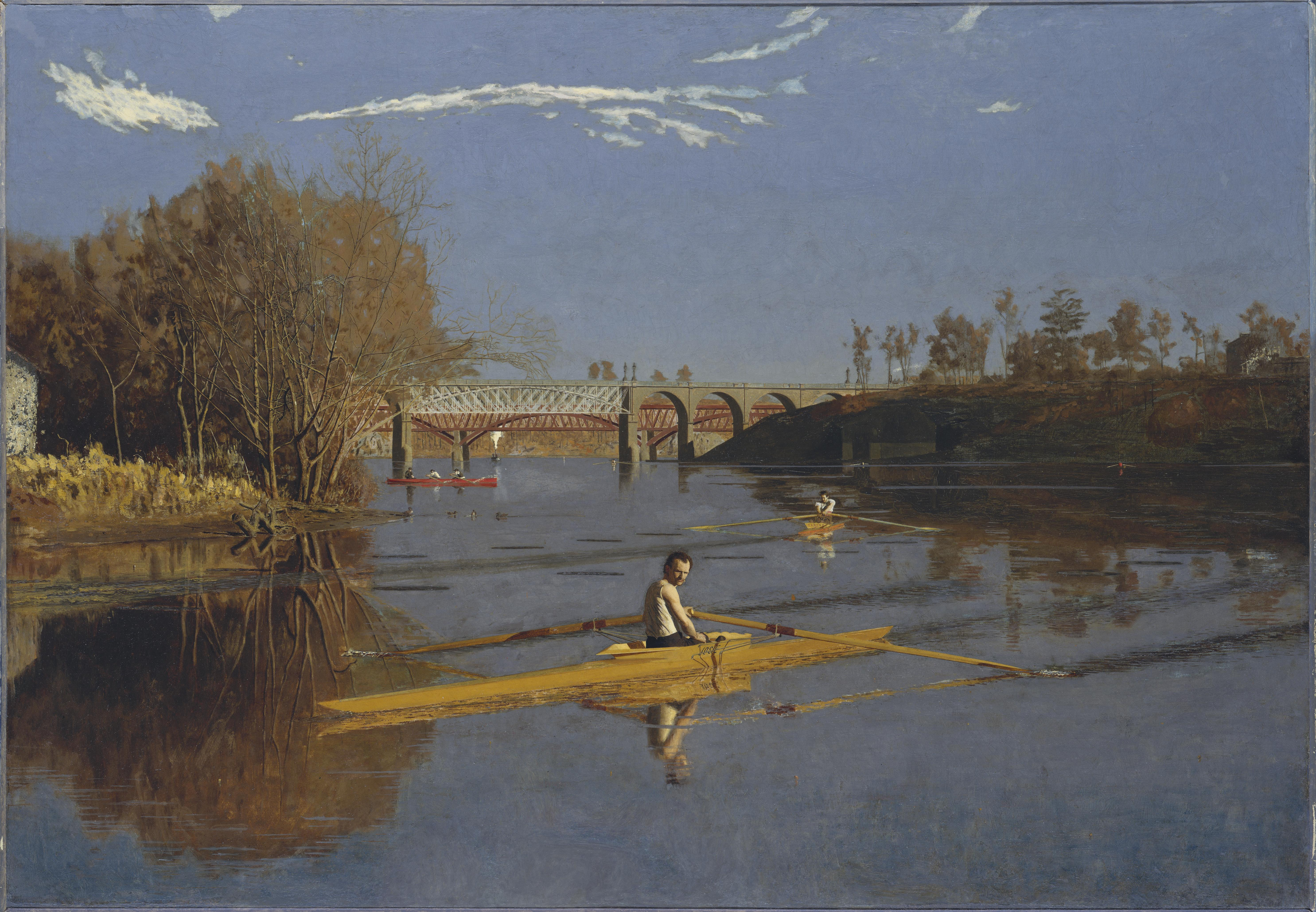
Thomas Eakins, Max Schmitt in a single scull, 1871

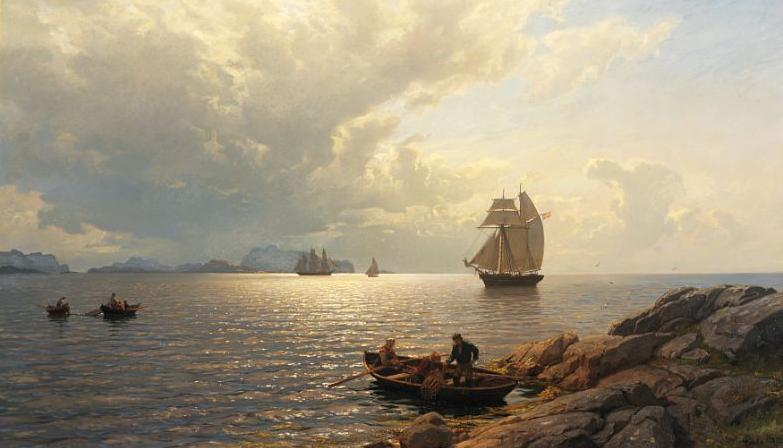
Hans Gude, Sailing into Oslo Fiord, 1872

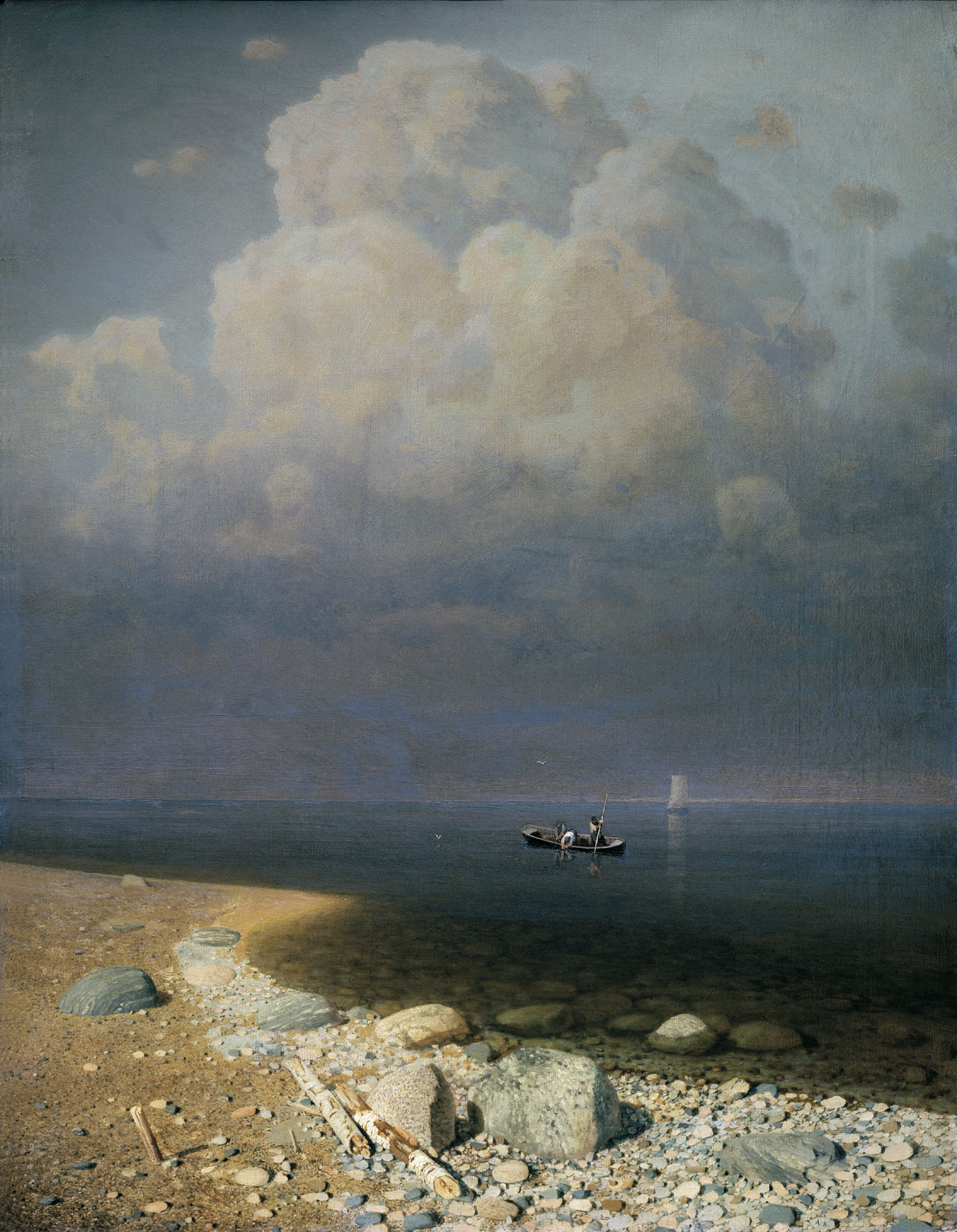
Arkhip Kuindzhi, Lake Ladoga, 1873

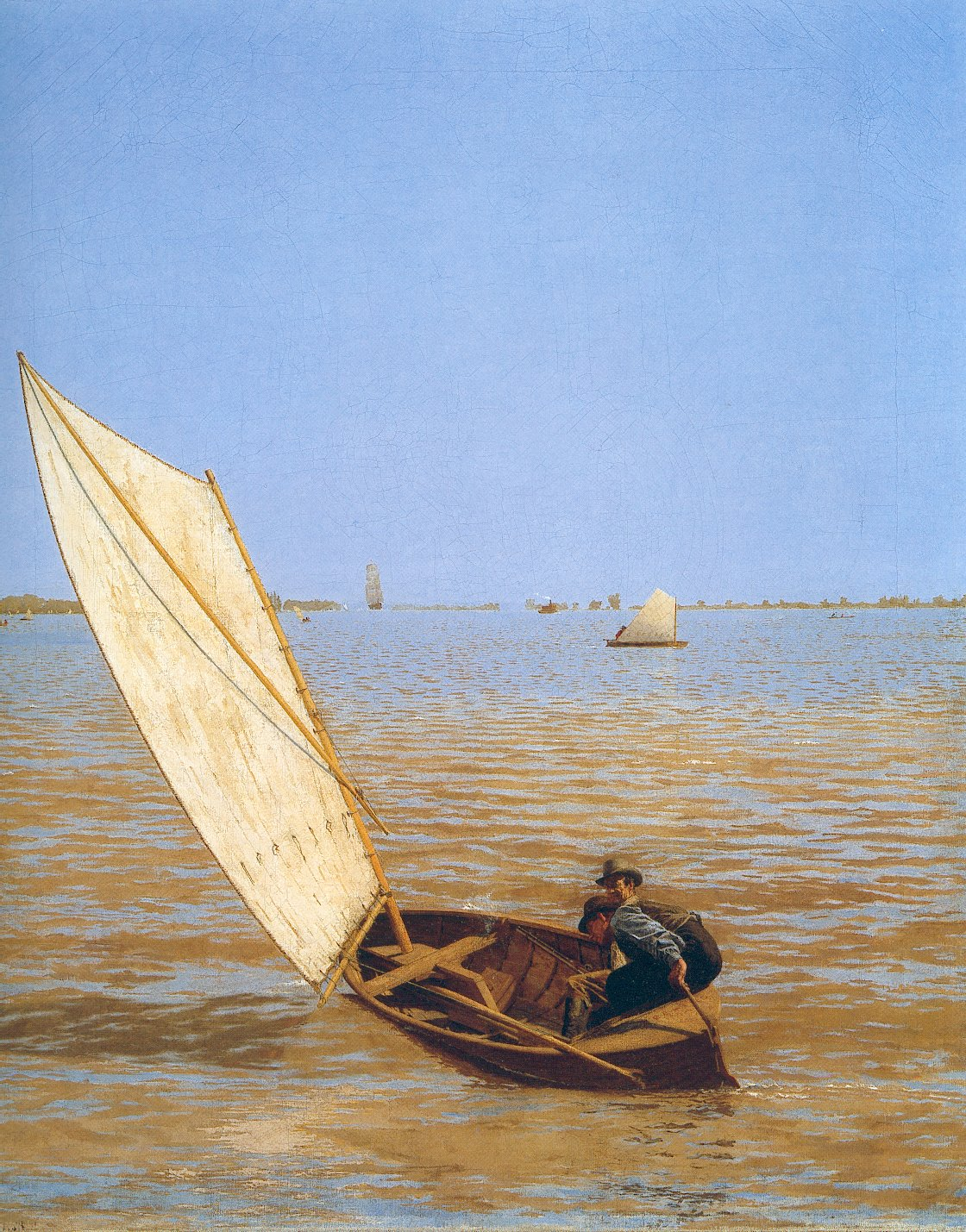
Thomas Eakins, Starting Out After Rail, 1874

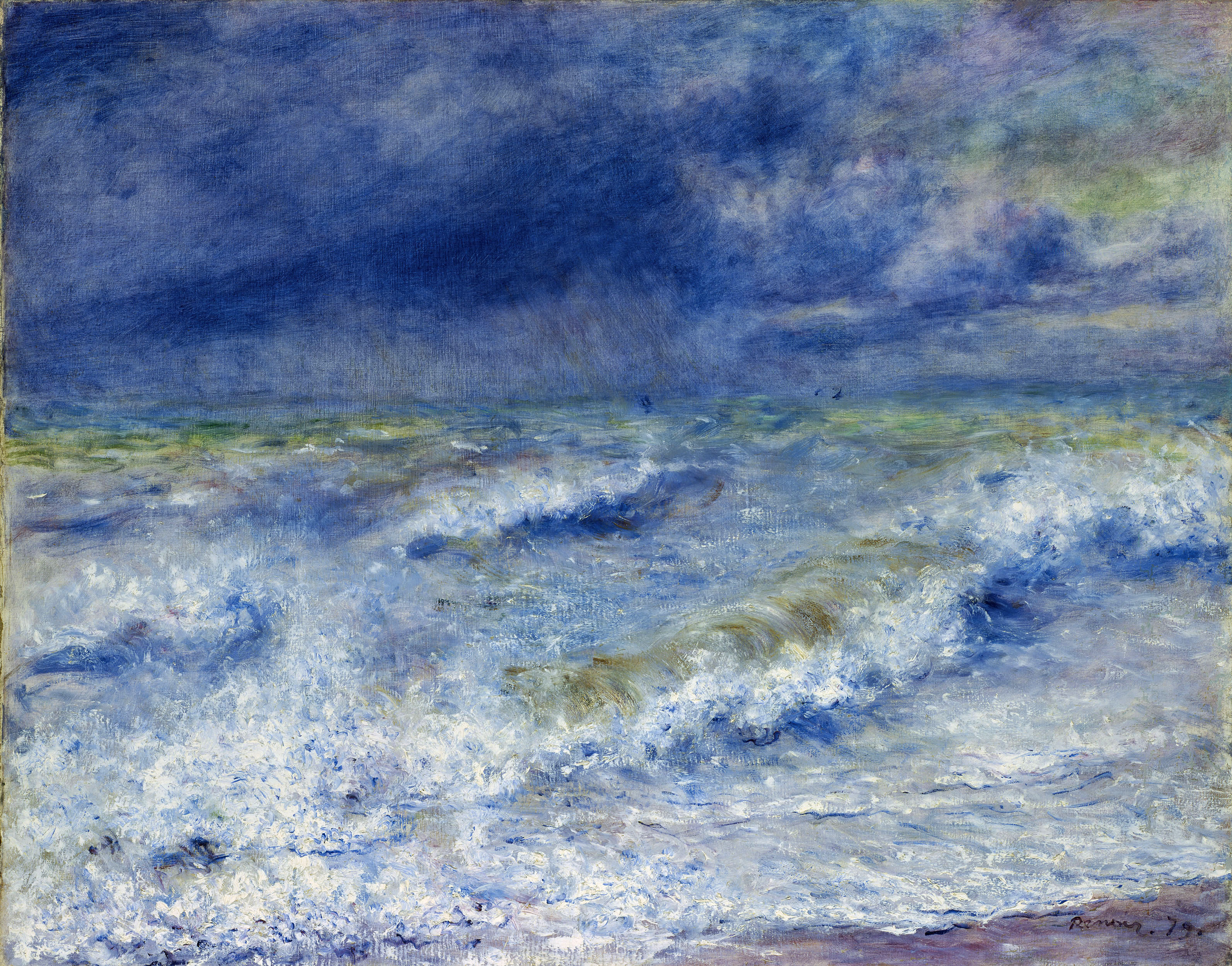
Pierre-Auguste Renoir, The Wave, 1879

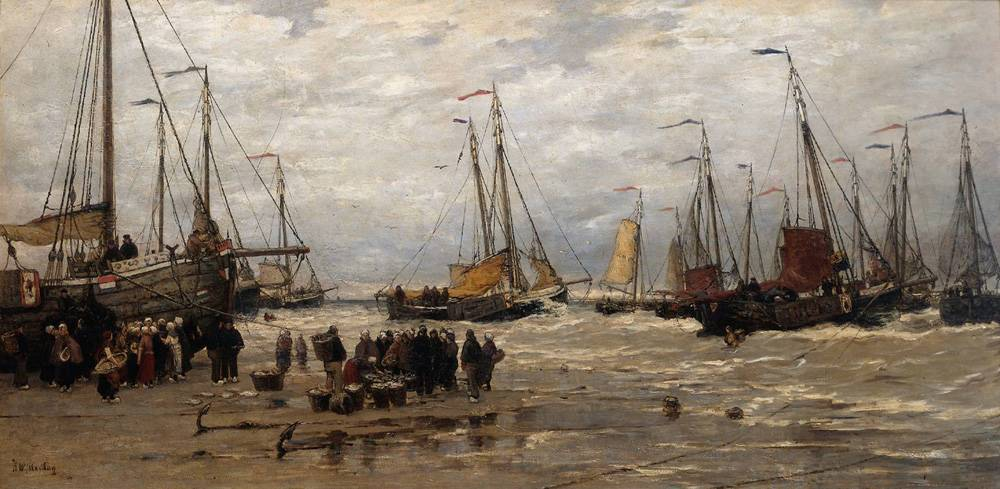
Hendrik Willem Mesdag, Pinks in the breakers, c. 1880

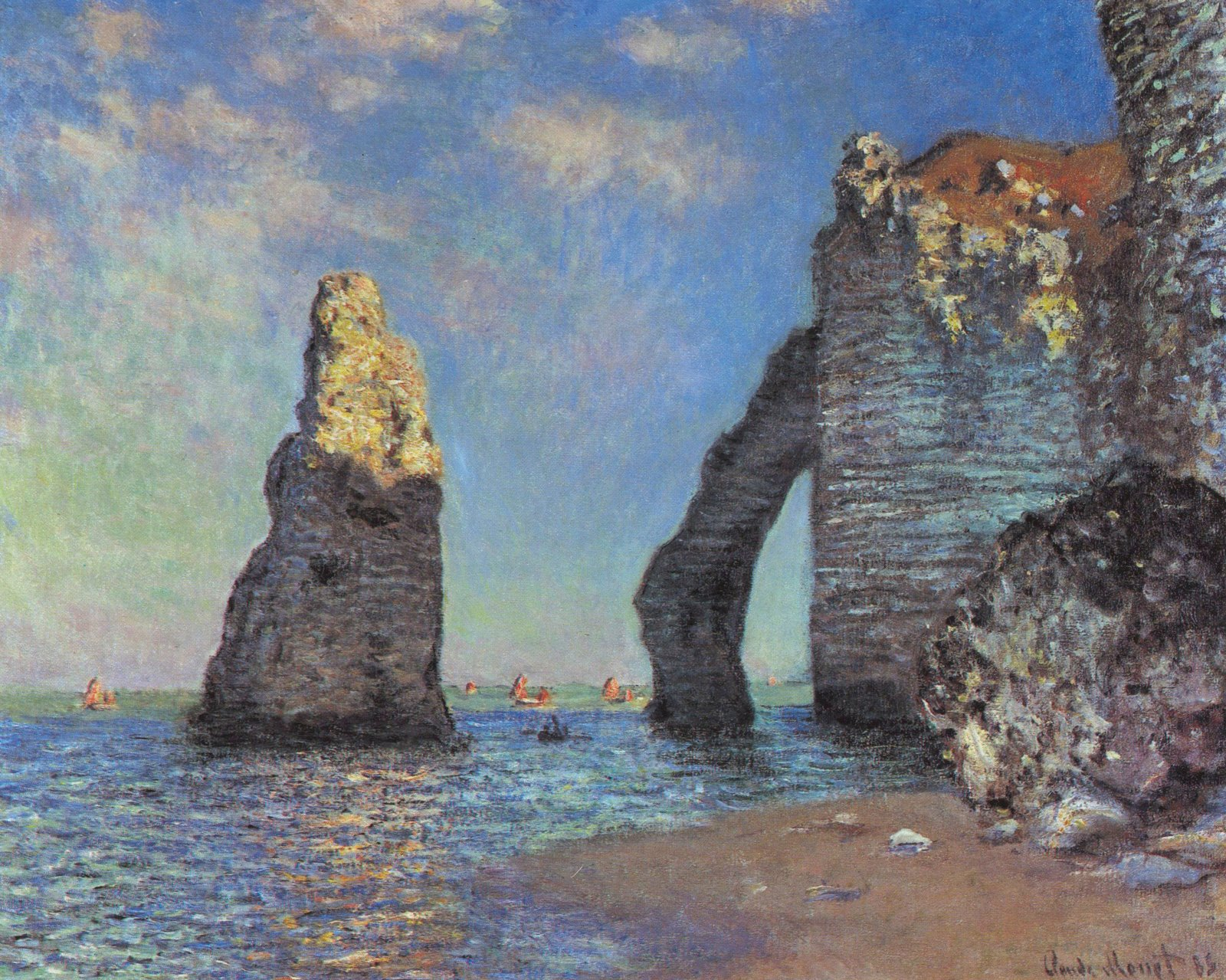
Claude Monet, The Cliffs at Étretat, 1885

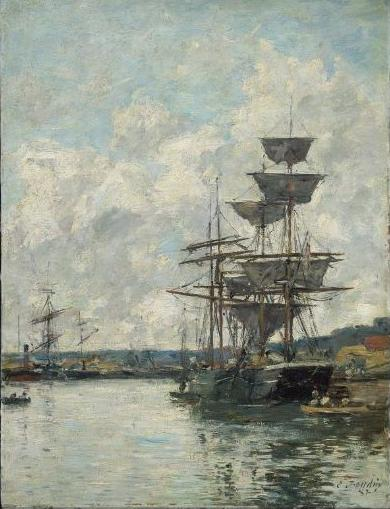
Eugène Boudin, Ships at Le Havre, 1887

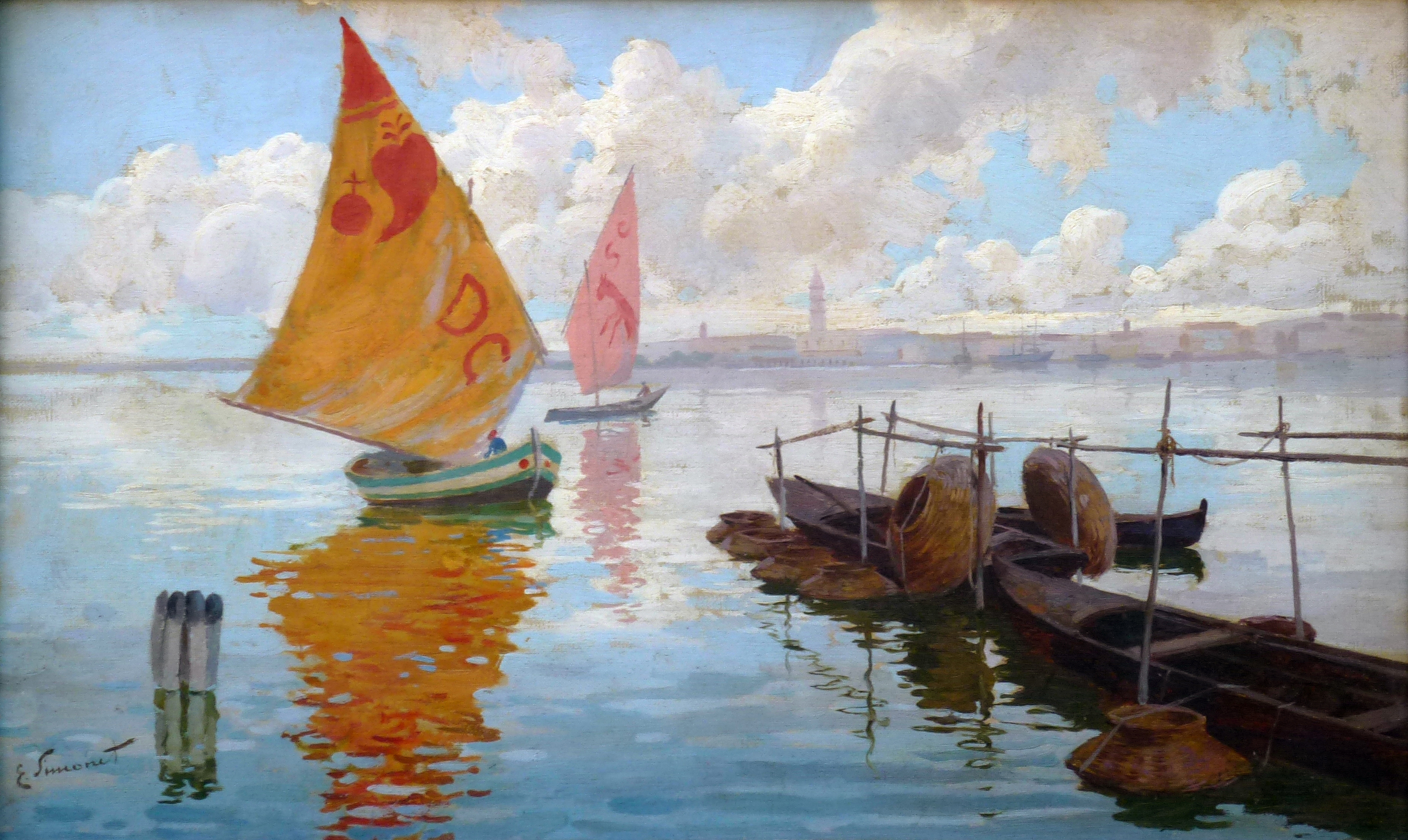
Enrique Simonet, Venetian marine, 1887–1890

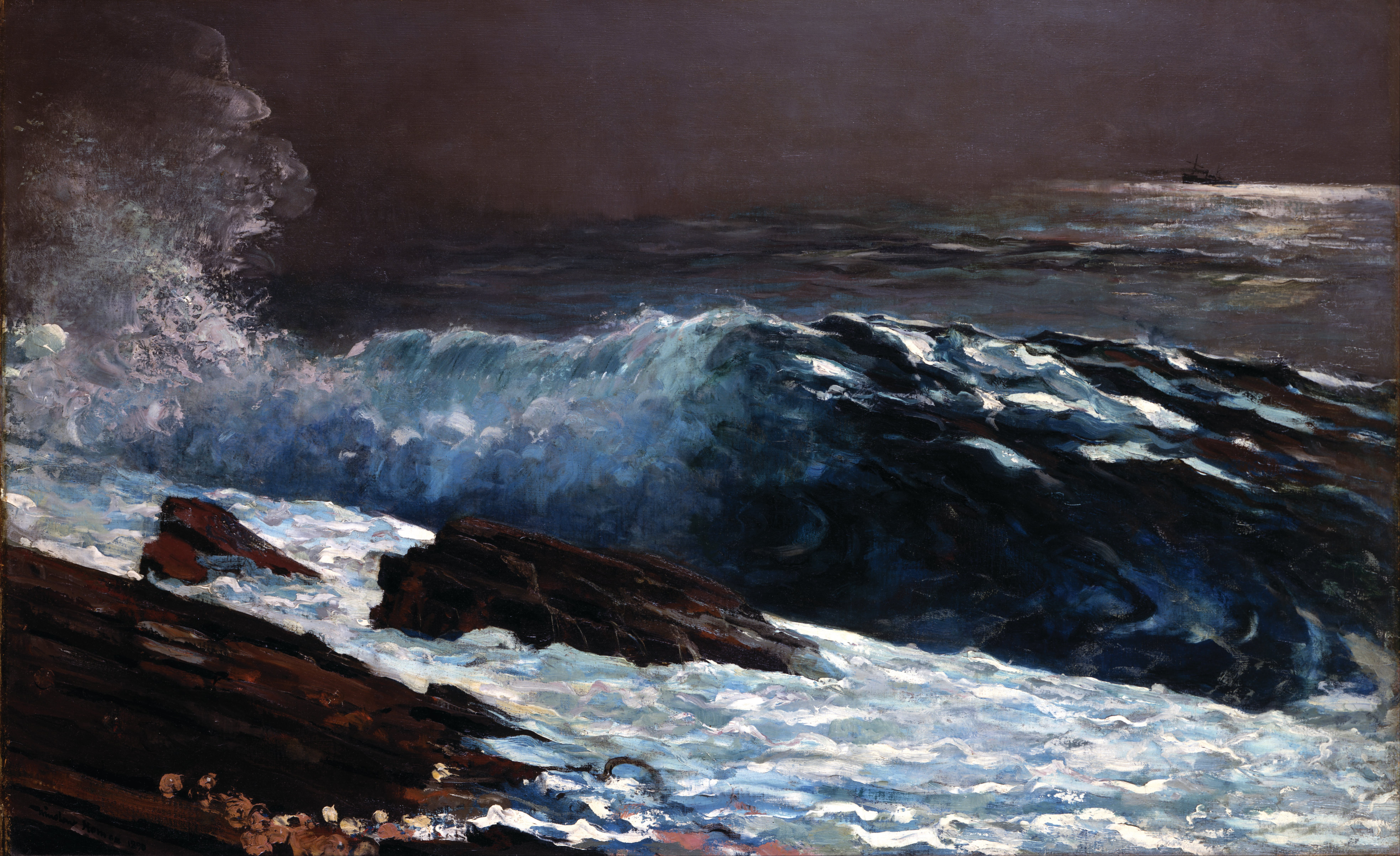
Winslow Homer, Sunlight on the Coast, 1890

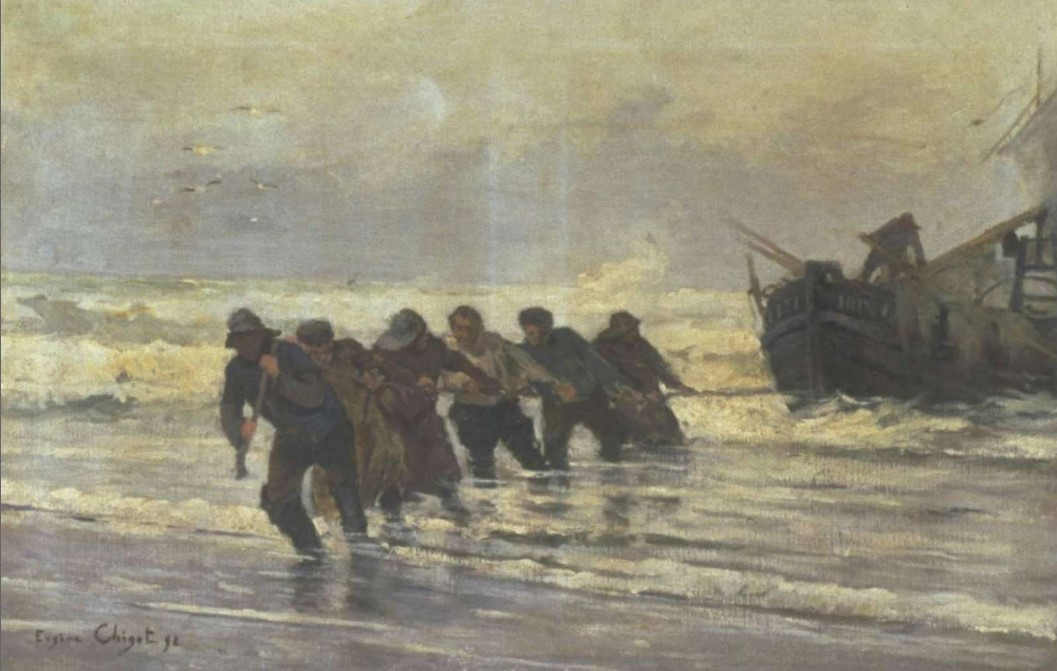
Eugène Chigot, Stranded in Heavy Weather (Échouage par gros temps) 1892

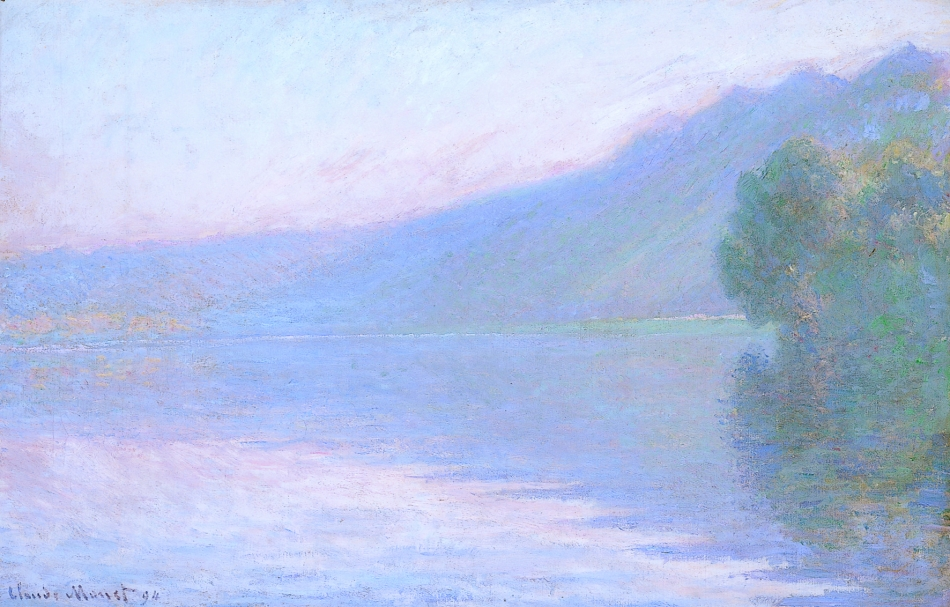
Claude Monet, The Seine at Port-Villez, 1894

=== 20th-century gallery ===
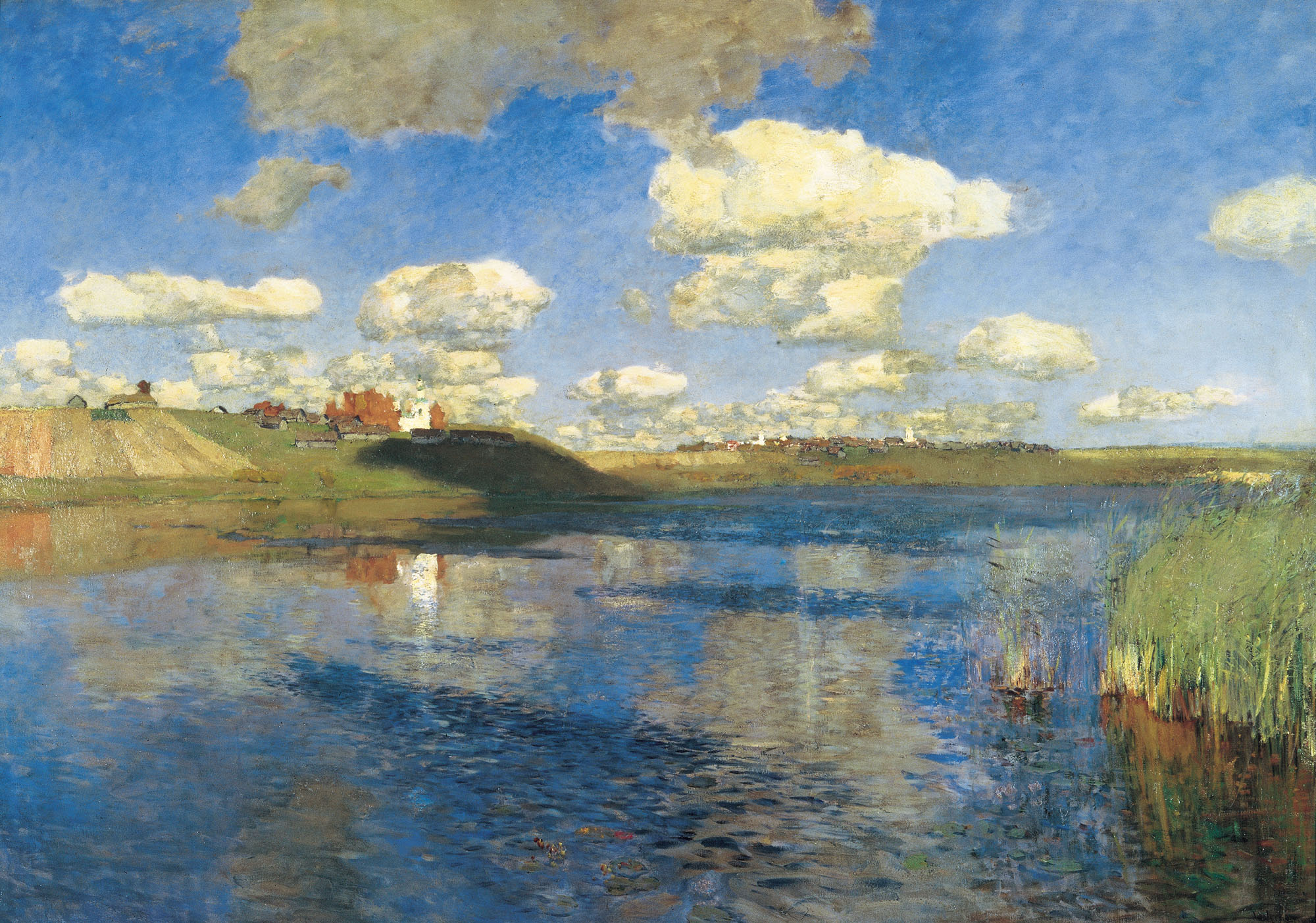
Isaac Levitan, Lake. Russia 1900

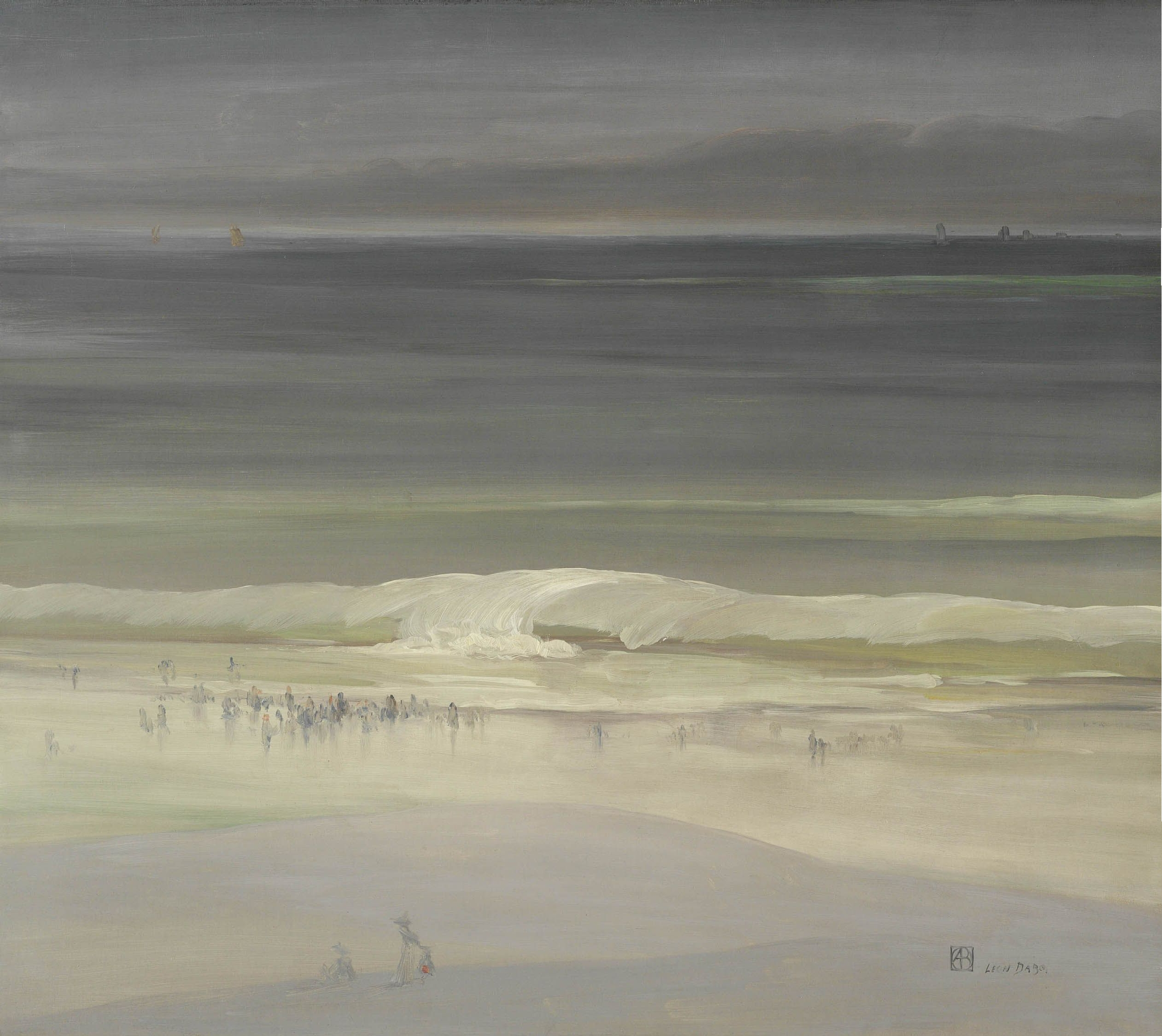
Leon Dabo, The Seashore, ca. 1900

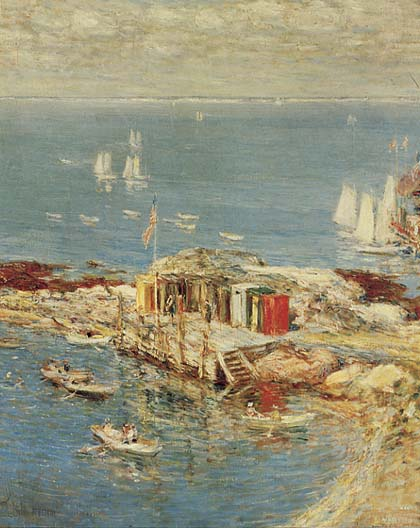
Childe Hassam, August Afternoon, Appledore, 1900

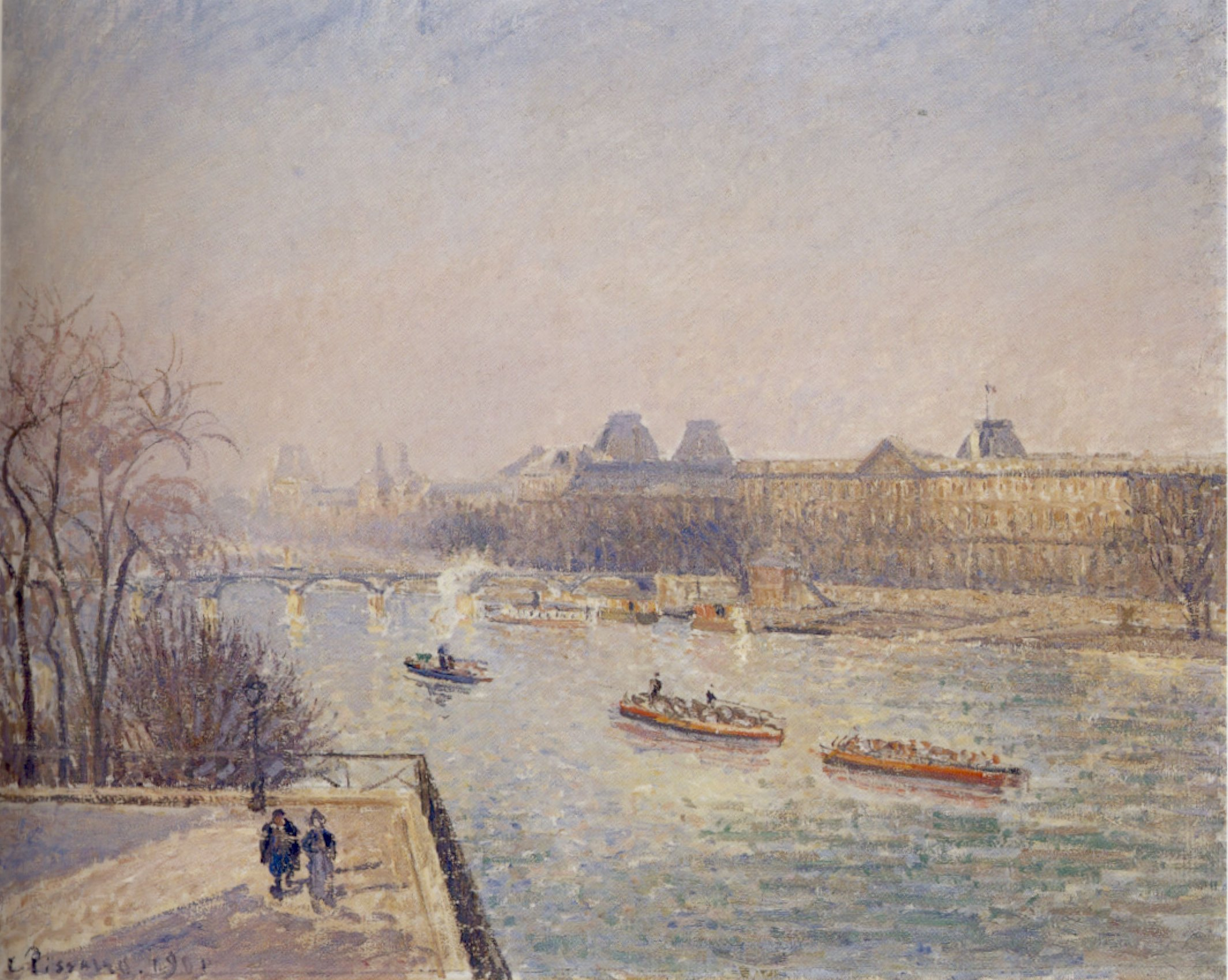
Camille Pissarro, Morning, Winter Sunshine, Frost, the Pont-Neuf, the Seine, the Louvre, Soleil D'hiver Gella Blanc, c. 1901

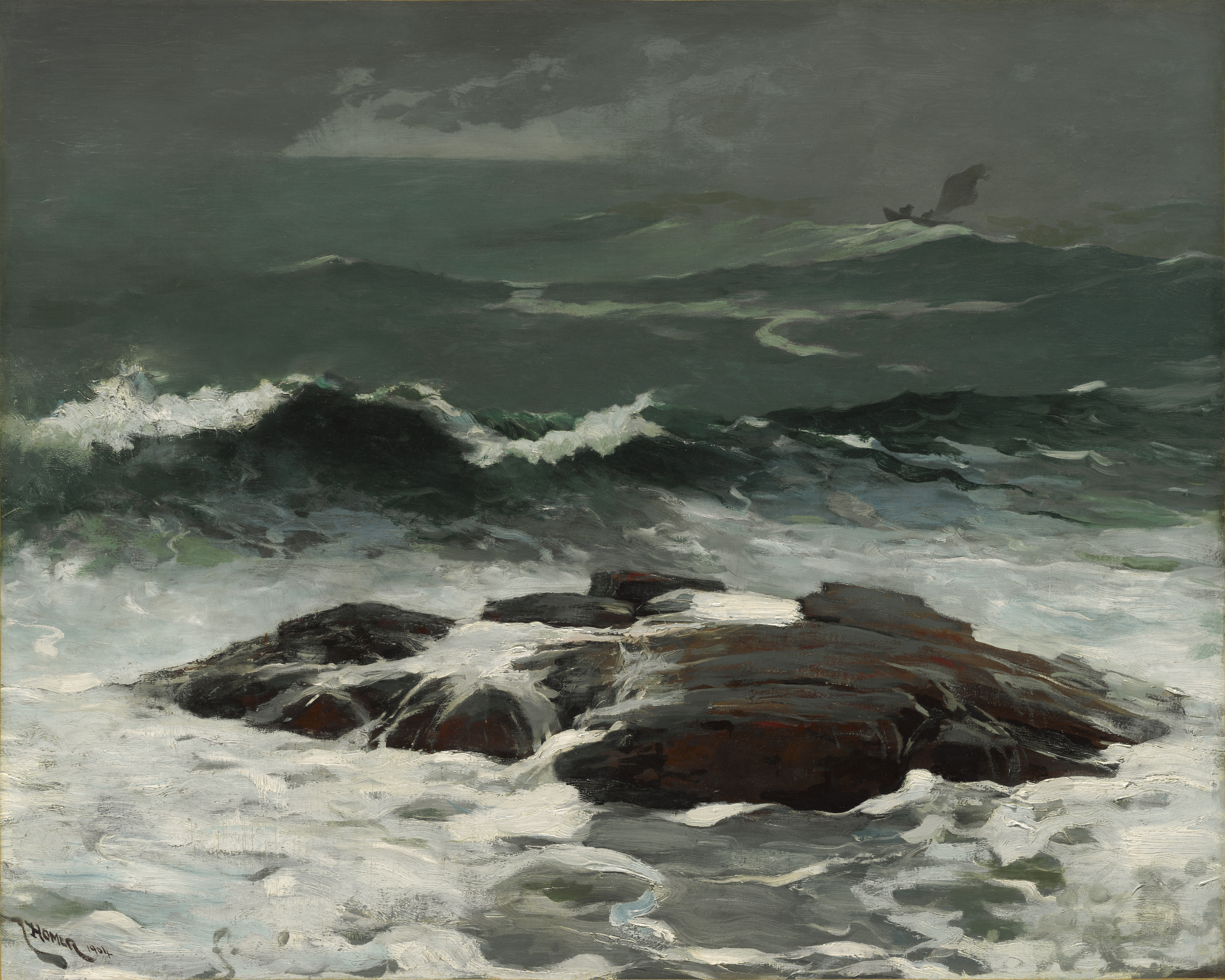
Winslow Homer, Summer Squall, 1904

Maurice de Vlaminck, The River Seine at Chatou, 1906

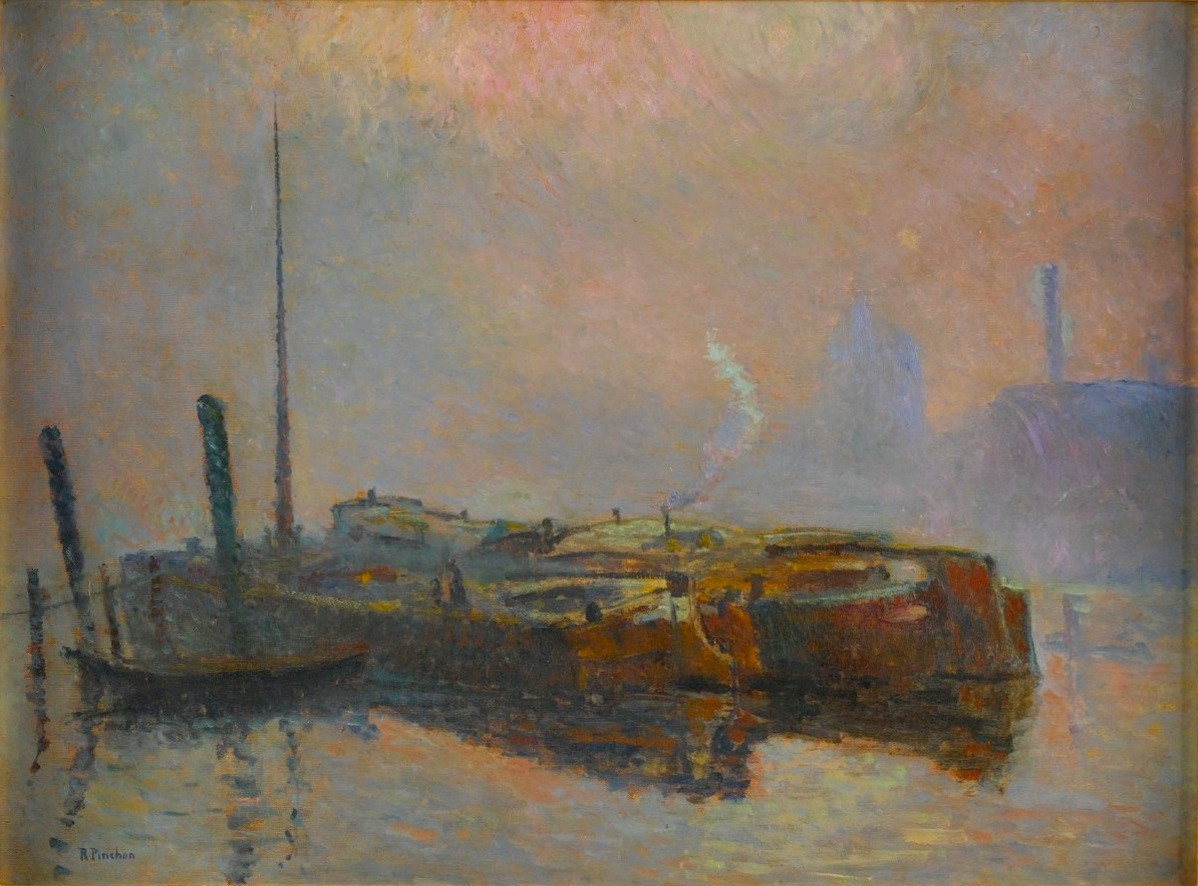
Robert Antoine Pinchon, Péniche dans la brume, before 1909, Musée des Beaux-Arts de Rouen

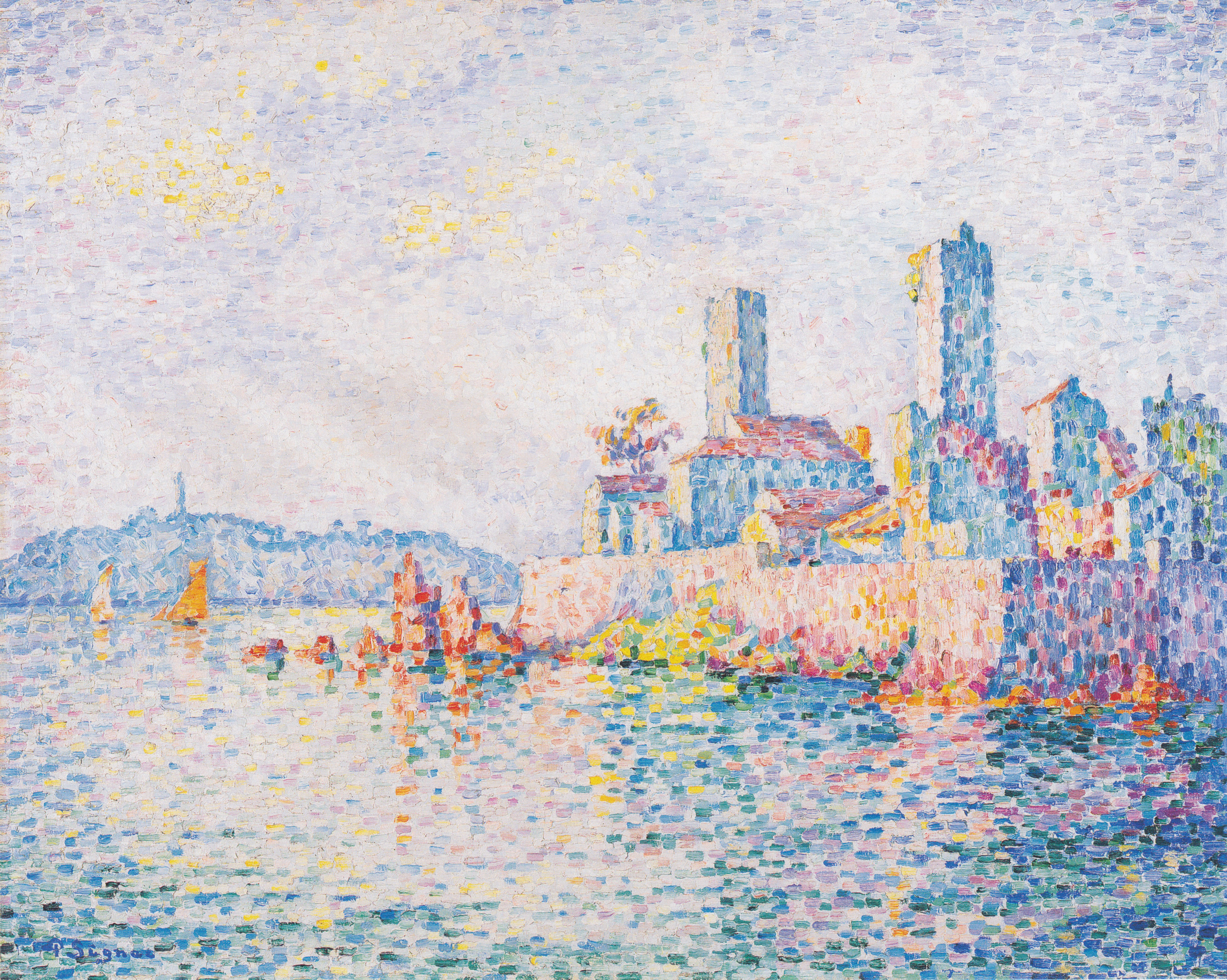
Paul Signac, Antibes, the towers, 1911

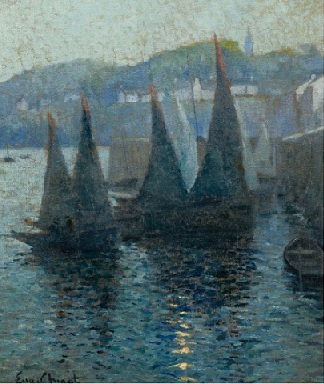
Eugène Chigot',Voiliers au Port (sailing boats in the port), 1911

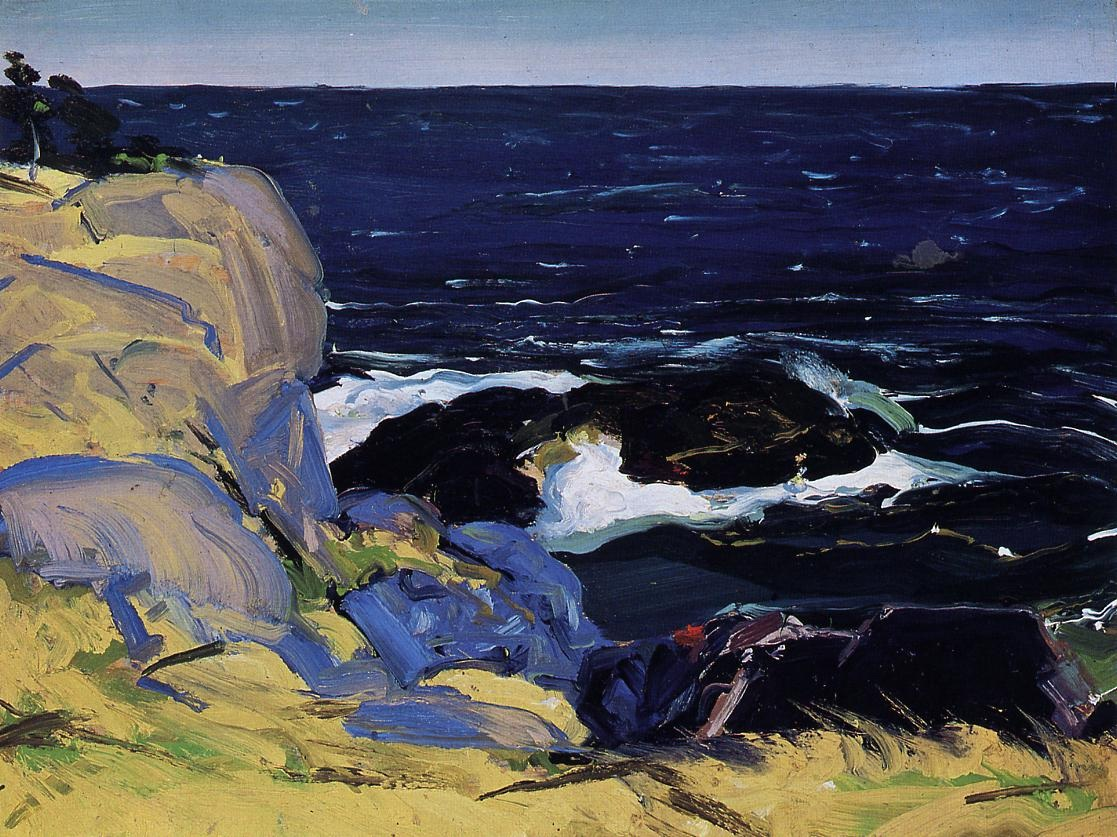
George Bellows, West Wind, 1913

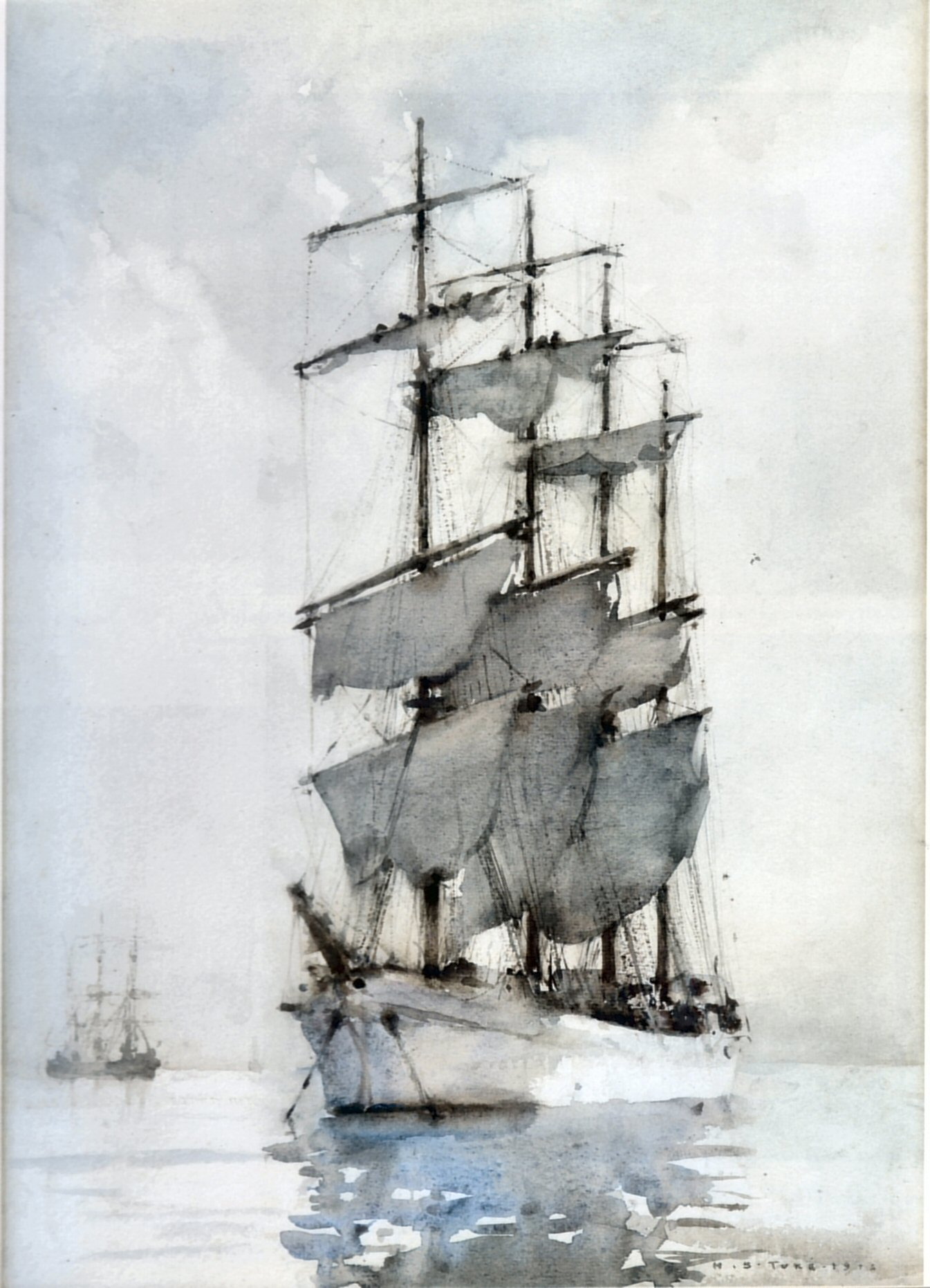
Henry Scott Tuke, Four Masted Barque, 1914

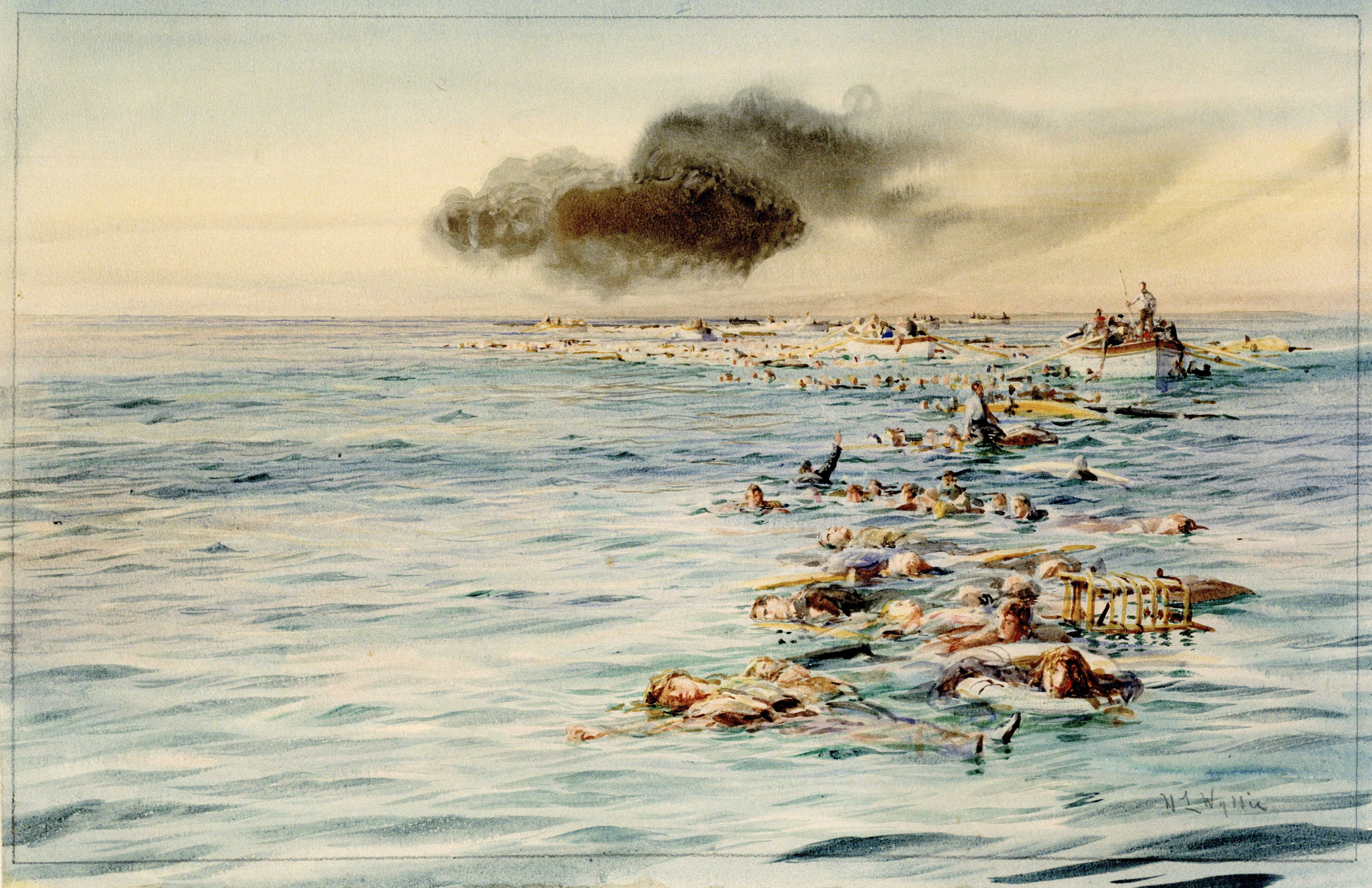
William Lionel Wyllie, The Track of Lusitania. View of Casualties and Survivors in the Water and in Lifeboats, 1915

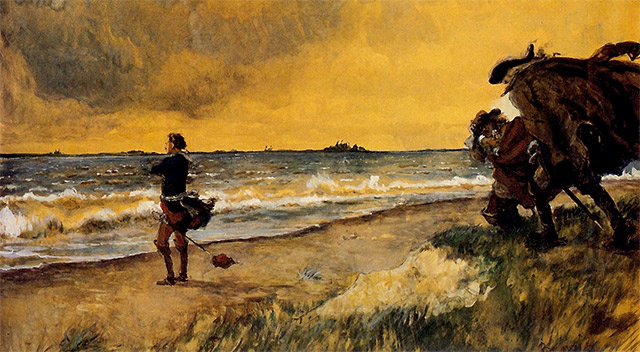
Alexander Benois, On a deserted, wave-swept shore..., 1916

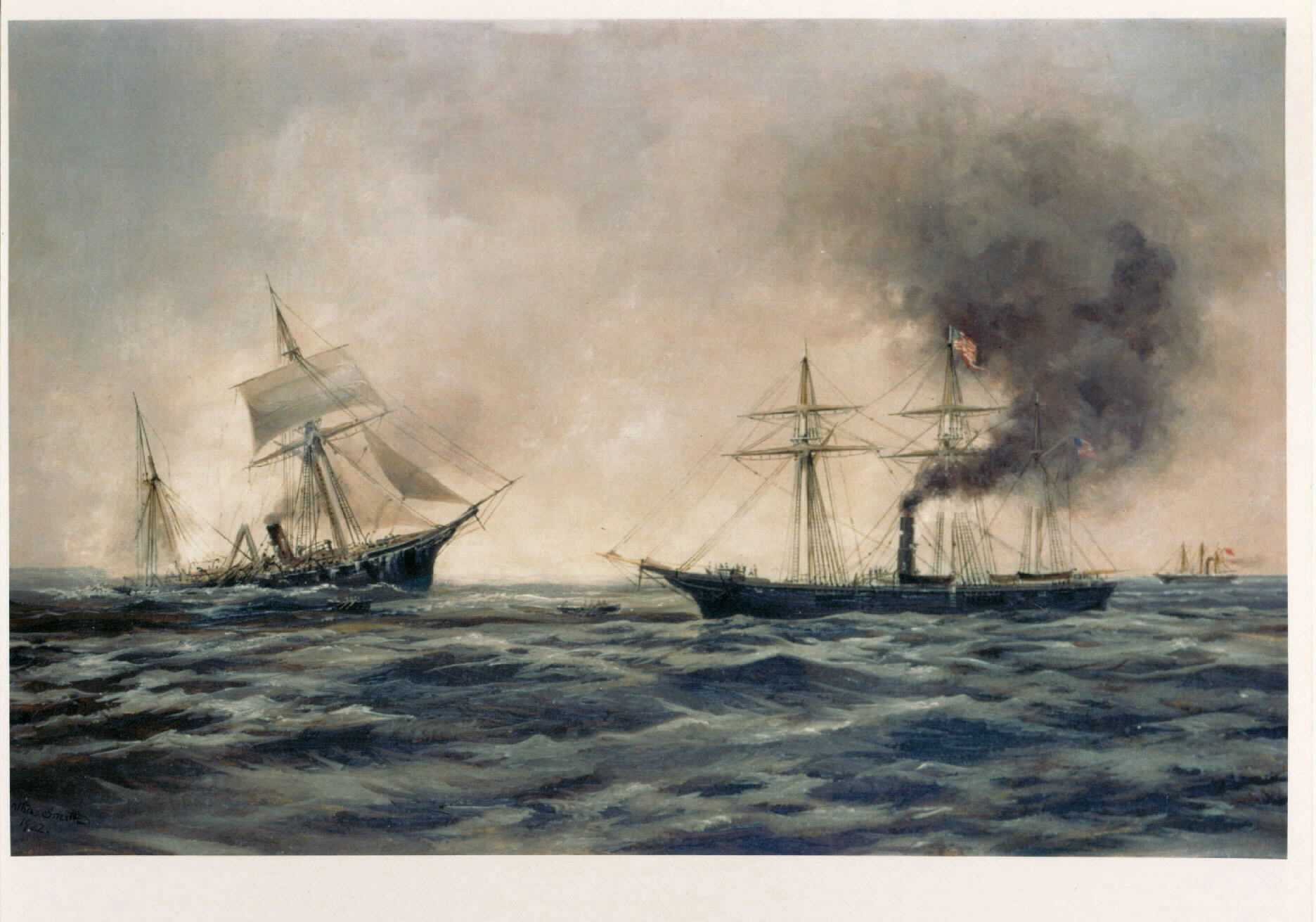
Xanthus Russell Smith, The Kearsarge and the Alabama, 1922

=== 21st-century gallery ===
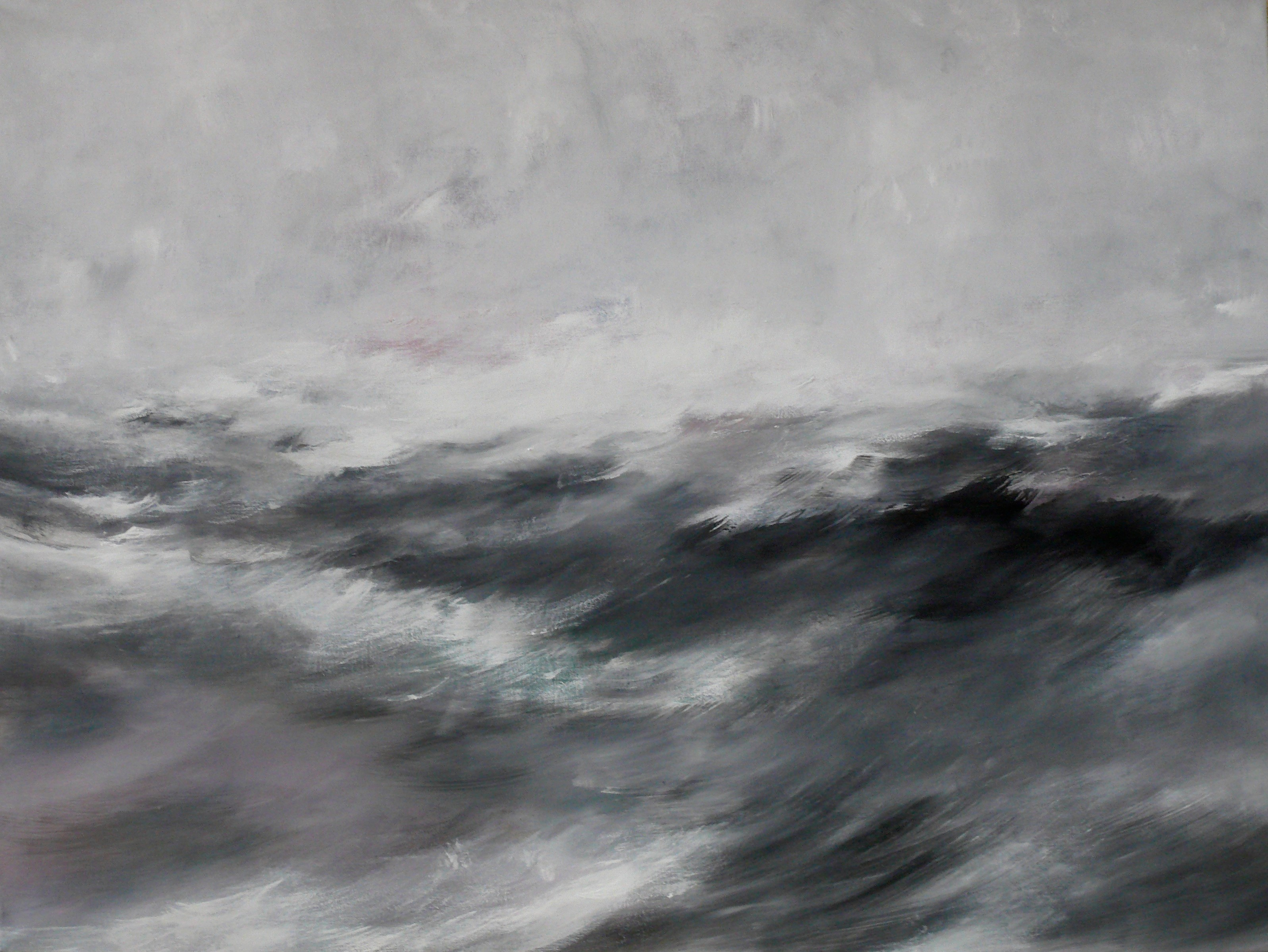
Ingo Kühl, Seebild 2014

== East Asian traditions ==
Court style panorama Along the River During the Qingming Festival, an 18th-century copy of a 12th-century original by Chinese artist Zhang Zeduan. The scroll begins at the right end, and culminates above as the Emperor boards his yacht to join the festive boats on the river.

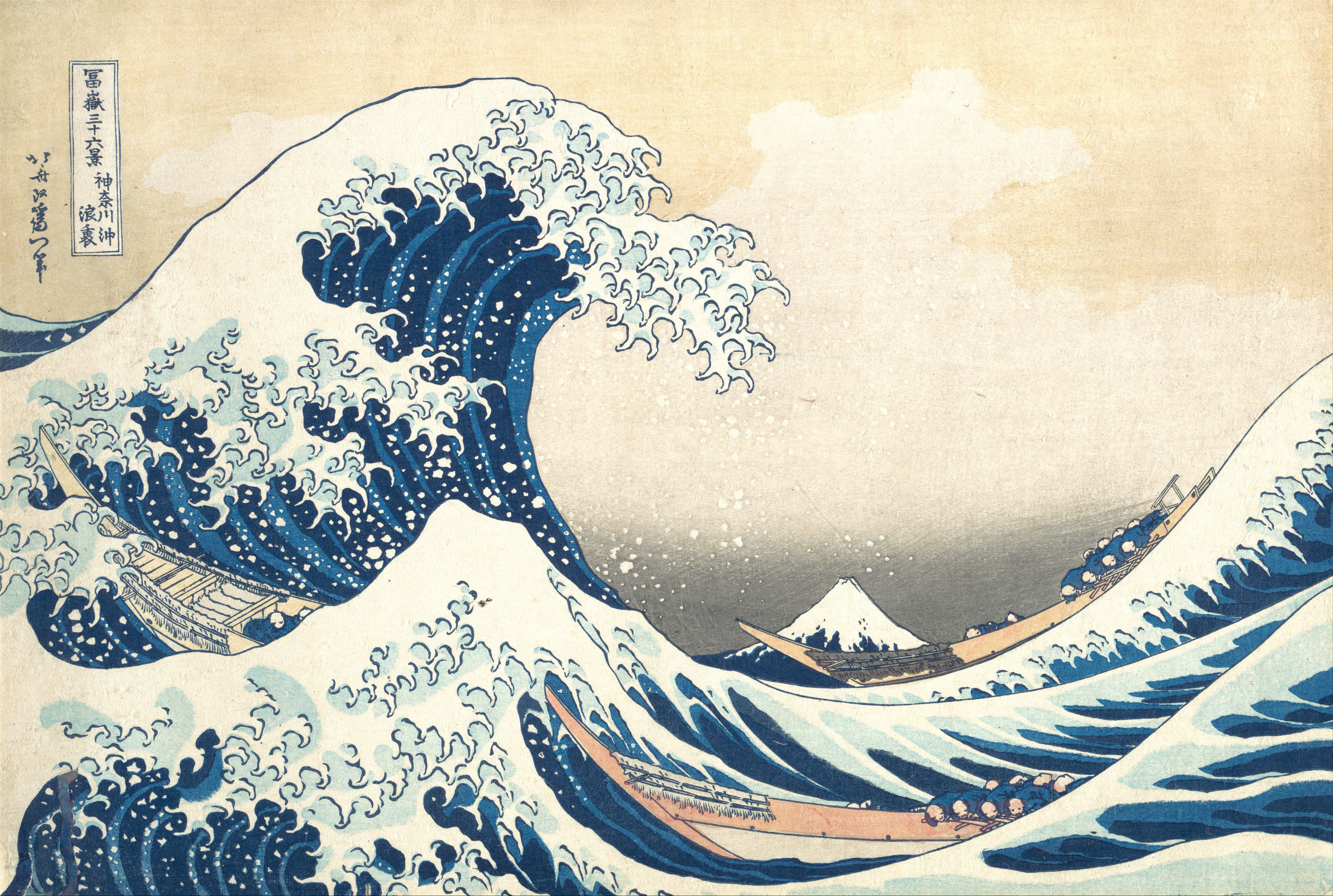
The Great Wave off Kanagawa, by Hokusai, c. 1830

As noted above, a river with a small boat or two was a standard component of Chinese ink and brush paintings, and many featured lakes and, less often, coastal views. However the water was often left as white space, with the emphasis firmly on the land elements in the scene. The more realist court school of Chinese painting often included careful depictions of the shipping on China's great rivers in the large horizontal scrolls showing panoramas of city scenes with the Emperors progressing across the Empire, or festivals like the one shown above.

The turning-away from long-distance maritime activity of both the Chinese and Japanese governments at the time of the Western Renaissance no doubt helped to inhibit the development of marine themes in the art of these countries, but the more popular Japanese ukiyo-e coloured woodblock prints very often featured coastal and river scenes with shipping, including The Great Wave off Kanagawa (1832) by Hokusai, the most famous of all ukiyo-e images.

== See also ==
- British Marine Art (Romantic Era)
- Half Hull Model Ships
- Seascape
- Category:Marine artists
- Category:Maritime paintings
