= Dutch Golden Age painting =

17th-century Dutch painting

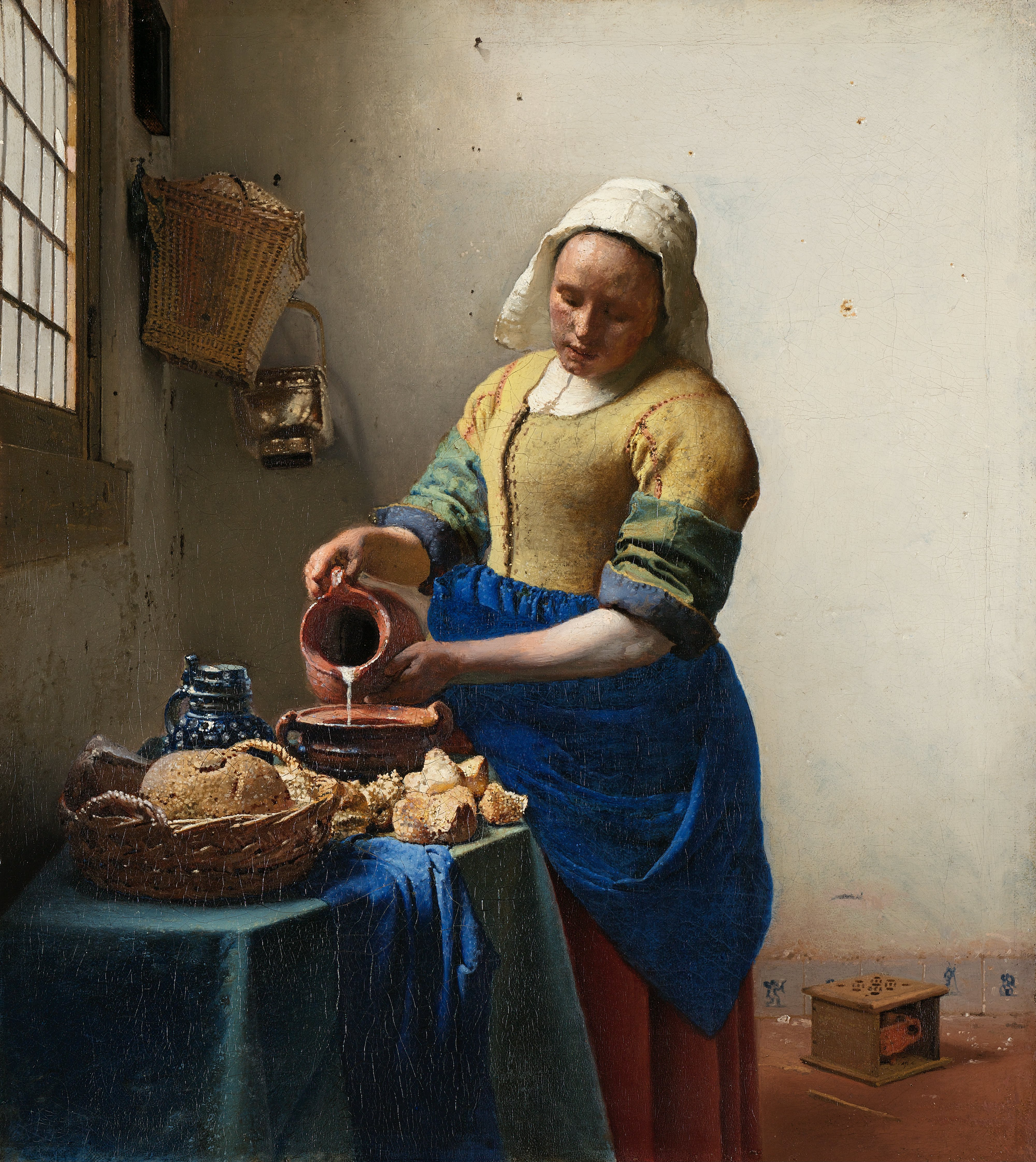
Johannes Vermeer, The Milkmaid (1658–1661)

Dutch Golden Age painting is the painting of the Dutch Golden Age, a period in Dutch history roughly spanning the 17th century, during and after the later part of the Eighty Years' War (1568–1648) for Dutch independence.

The new Dutch Republic was the most prosperous nation in Europe and led European trade and science. The northern Netherlandish provinces that made up the new state had traditionally been less important artistic centres than cities in Flanders in the south. The upheavals and large-scale transfers of population of the war, and the sharp break with the old monarchist and Catholic cultural traditions, meant that Dutch art had to reinvent itself almost entirely, a task in which it was very largely successful. The painting of religious subjects declined very sharply, but a large new market for all kinds of secular subjects grew up.

Although Dutch painting of the Golden Age is included in the general European period of Baroque painting, and often shows many of its characteristics, most lacks the idealization and love of splendour typical of much Baroque work, including that of neighbouring Flanders. Most work, including that for which the period is best known, reflects the traditions of detailed realism inherited from Early Netherlandish painting.

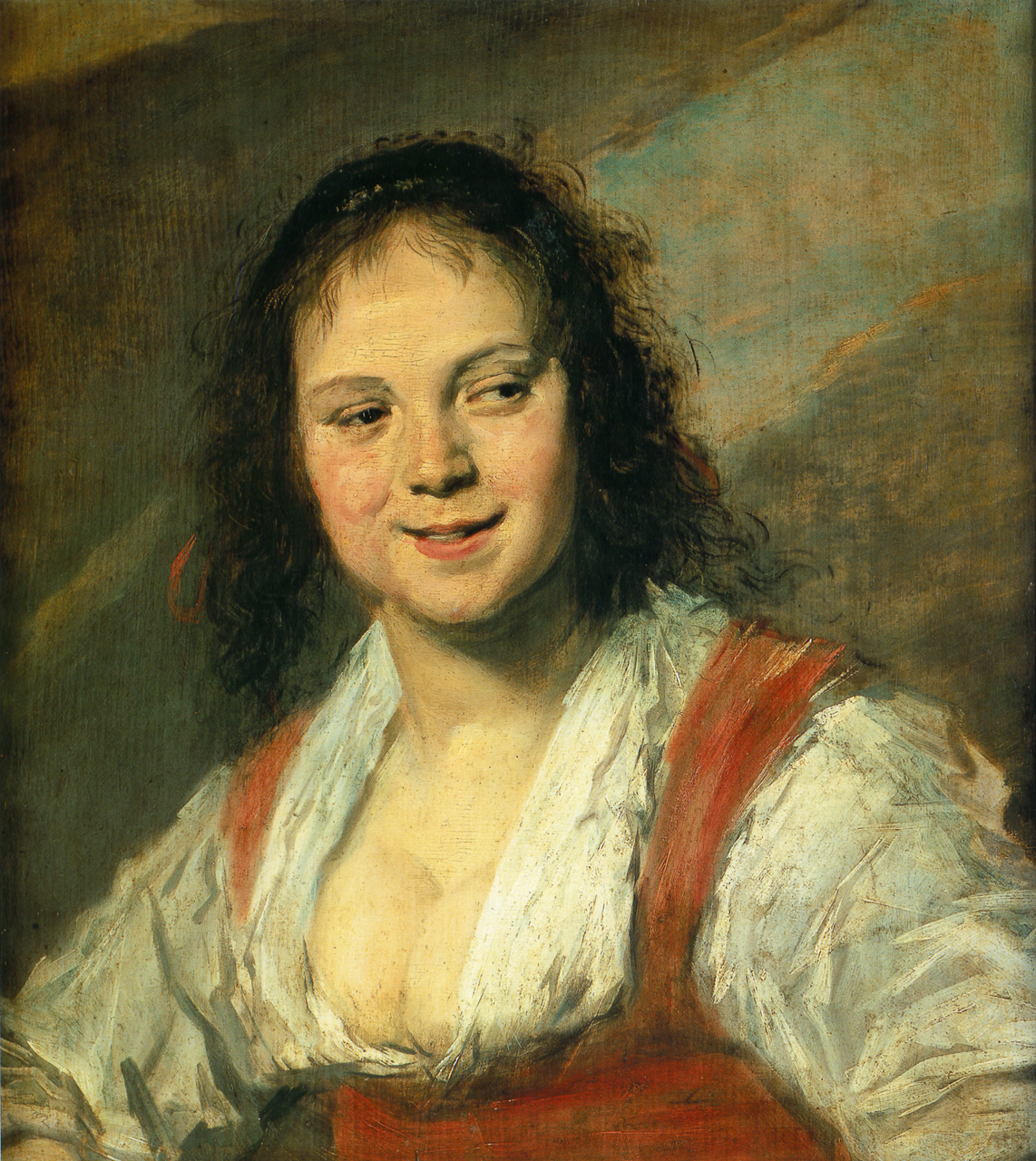
Frans Hals' tronie, with the later title Gypsy Girl. 1628–30. Oil on wood, 58 cm × 52 cm (23 in × 20 in). The tronie includes elements of portraiture, genre painting, and sometimes history painting.

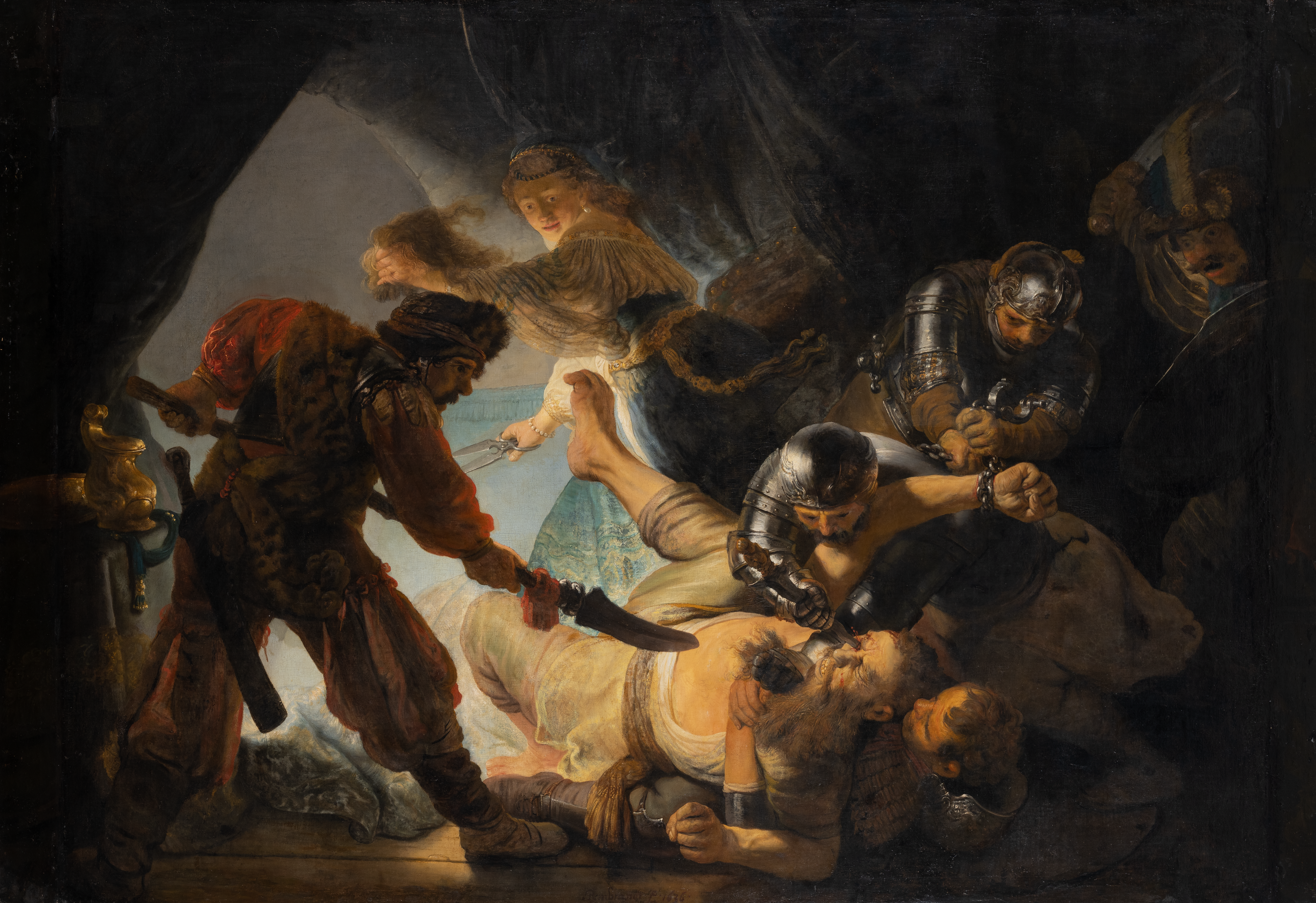
The Blinding of Samson, 1636, which Rembrandt gave to Huyghens

A distinctive feature of the period is the proliferation of distinct genres of paintings, with the majority of artists producing the bulk of their work within one of these. The full development of this specialization is seen from the late 1620s, and the period from then until the French invasion of 1672 is the core of Golden Age painting. Artists would spend most of their careers painting only portraits, genre scenes, landscapes, seascapes and ships, or still lifes, and often a particular sub-type within these categories. Many of these types of subjects were new in Western painting, and the way the Dutch painted them in this period was decisive for their future development.

== Types of painting ==
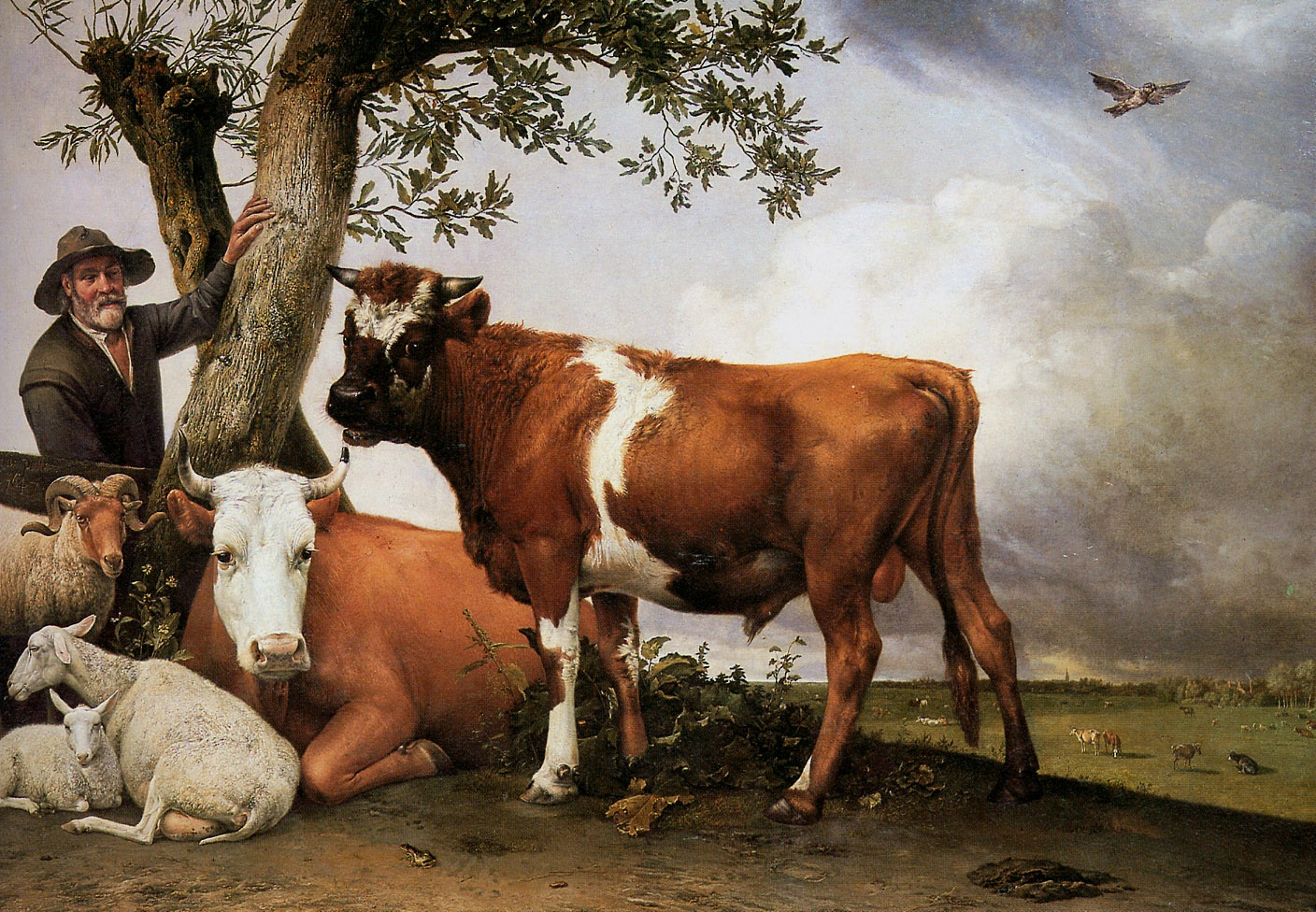
Paulus Potter, The Young Bull (1647); 3.4 metres wide. An unusually monumental animal painting that challenges the hierarchy of genres.

A distinctive feature of the period, compared to earlier European painting, was the small amount of religious painting. Dutch Calvinism forbade religious painting in churches, and though biblical subjects were acceptable in private homes, relatively few were produced. The other traditional classes of history and portrait painting were present, but the period is more notable for a huge variety of other genres, sub-divided into numerous specialized categories, such as scenes of peasant life, landscapes, townscapes, landscapes with animals, maritime paintings, flower paintings and still lifes of various types. The development of many of these types of painting was decisively influenced by 17th-century Dutch artists.

The widely held theory of the "hierarchy of genres" in painting, whereby some types were regarded as more prestigious than others, led many painters to want to produce history painting. However, this was the hardest to sell, as even Rembrandt found. Many were forced to produce portraits or genre scenes, which sold much more easily. In descending order of status, the categories in the hierarchy were:

- History painting, including allegories and popular religious subjects.
- Portrait painting, including the tronie
- Genre painting or scenes of everyday life
- Landscape, including seascapes, battle scenes, cityscapes, and ruins (landscapists were the "common footmen in the Army of Art" according to Samuel van Hoogstraten.)
- Still life

The Dutch concentrated heavily on the "lower" categories, but by no means rejected the concept of the hierarchy. Most paintings were relatively small – the only common type of really large paintings were group portraits. Painting directly onto walls hardly existed; when a wall-space in a public building needed decorating, fitted framed canvas was normally used. For the extra precision possible on a hard surface, many painters continued to use wooden panels, sometime after the rest of Western Europe had abandoned them; some used copper plates, usually recycling plates from printmaking. In turn, the number of surviving Golden Age paintings was reduced by them being overpainted with new works by artists throughout the 18th and 19th century – poor ones were usually cheaper than a new canvas, stretcher and frame.

There was very little Dutch sculpture during the period; it is mostly found in tomb monuments and attached to public buildings, and small sculptures for houses are a noticeable gap, their place taken by silverware and ceramics. Painted delftware tiles were very cheap and common, if rarely of really high quality, but silver, especially in the auricular style, led Europe. With this exception, the best artistic efforts were concentrated on painting and printmaking.

== The art world ==
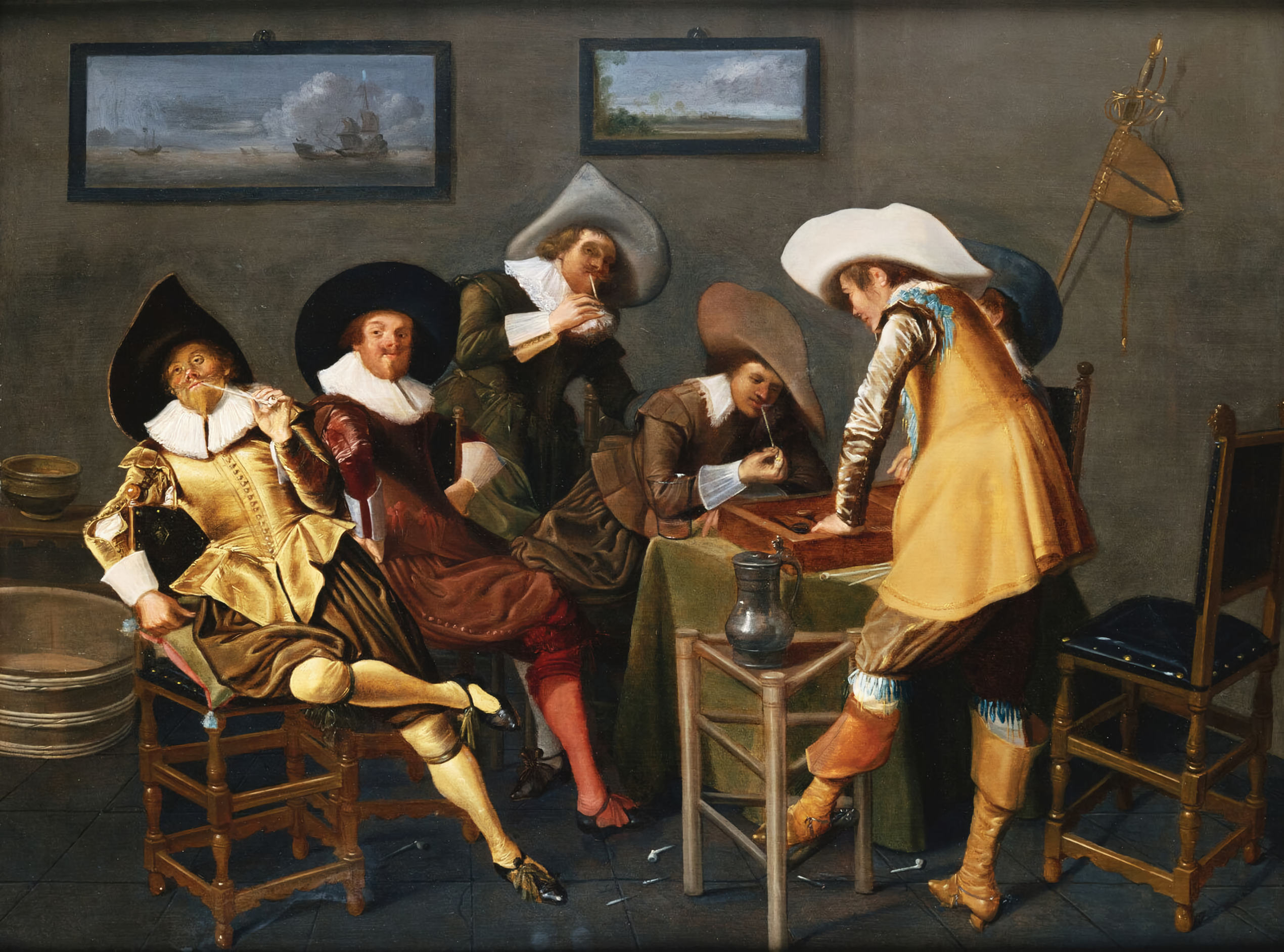
Dirck Hals, genre scene of Gentlemen Smoking and Playing Backgammon in a Tavern. Note: see also here.

Foreigners remarked on the enormous quantities of art produced and the large fairs where many paintings were sold – it has been roughly estimated that over 1.3 million Dutch pictures were painted in the 20 years after 1640 alone. The volume of production meant that prices were fairly low, except for the best known artists; as in most subsequent periods, there was a steep price gradient for more fashionable artists. Those without a strong contemporary reputation, or who had fallen out of fashion, including many now considered among the greatest of the period, such as Vermeer, Frans Hals and Rembrandt in his last years, had considerable problems earning a living, and died poor; many artists had other jobs, or abandoned art entirely. In particular, the French invasion of 1672 (the Rampjaar, or "year of disaster") brought a severe depression to the art market, which never quite returned to earlier heights.

The distribution of pictures was very wide: "yea many tymes, blacksmithes, cobblers etts., will have some picture or other by their Forge and in their stalle. Such is the generall Notion, enclination and delight that these Countrie Native have to Painting" reported an English traveller in 1640. There were, for virtually the first time, many professional art dealers, several also significant artists, like Vermeer and his father, Jan van Goyen and Willem Kalf. Rembrandt's dealer Hendrick van Uylenburgh and his son Gerrit were among the most important. Landscapes were the easiest uncommissioned works to sell, and their painters were the "common footmen in the Army of Art" according to Samuel van Hoogstraten.

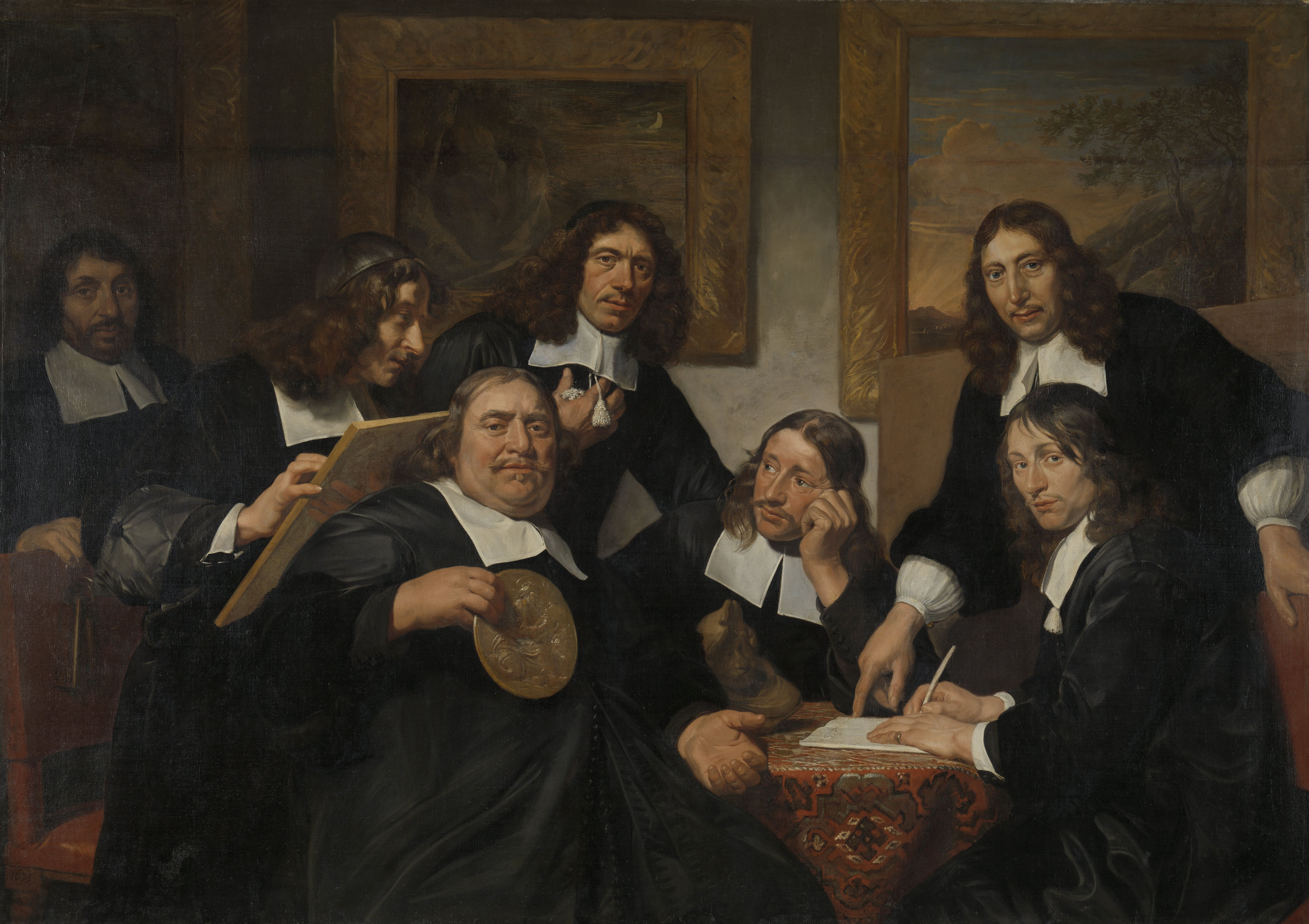
The Haarlem Painter's Guild in 1675, by Jan de Bray, whose self-portrait is the second from the left

The technical quality of Dutch artists was generally high, still mostly following the old medieval system of training by apprenticeship with a master. Typically, workshops were smaller than in Flanders or Italy, with only one or two apprentices at a time, the number often being restricted by guild regulations. The turmoil of the early years of the Republic, with displaced artists from the south moving north and the loss of traditional markets in the court and church, led to a resurgence of artists guilds, often still called the Guild of Saint Luke. In many cases these involved the artists extricating themselves from medieval groupings where they shared a guild with several other trades, such as housepainting. Several new guilds were established in the period: Amsterdam in 1579, Haarlem in 1590, and Gouda, Rotterdam, Utrecht and Delft between 1609 and 1611. The Leiden authorities distrusted guilds and did not allow one until 1648.

Later in the century, it began to become clear to all involved that the old idea of a guild controlling both training and sales no longer worked well, and gradually the guilds were replaced with academies, often only concerned with the training of artists. The Hague, with the court, was an early example, where artists split into two groups in 1656 with the founding of the Confrerie Pictura. With the obvious exception of portraits, many more Dutch paintings were done "speculatively" without a specific commission than was then the case in other countries – one of many ways in which the Dutch art market showed the future.

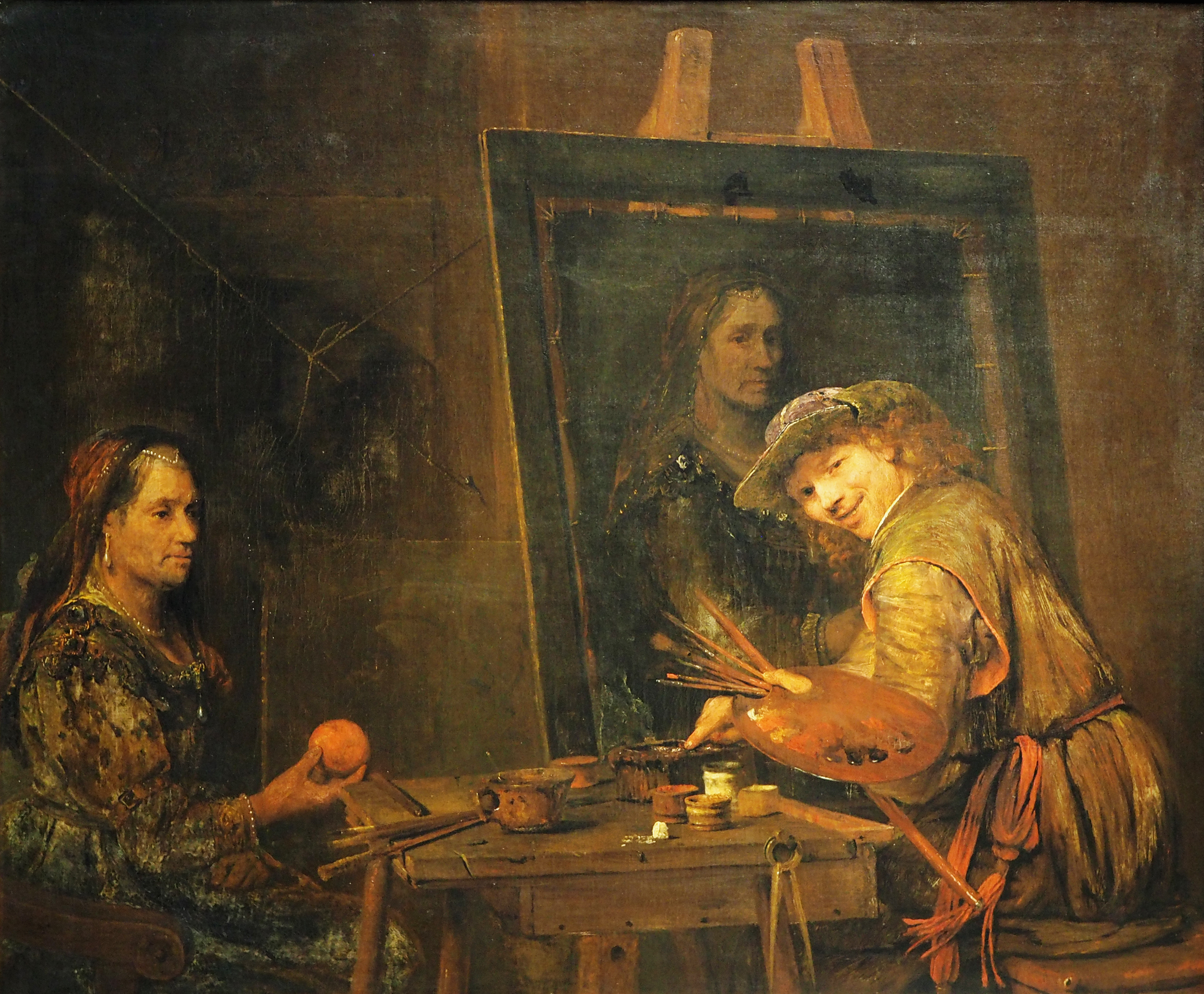
Aert de Gelder, Self-portrait as Zeuxis (1685)

There were many dynasties of artists, and many married the daughters of their masters or other artists. Many artists came from well-off families, who paid fees for their apprenticeships, and they often married into property. Rembrandt and Jan Steen were both enrolled at the University of Leiden for a while. Several cities had distinct styles and specialities by subject, but Amsterdam was the largest artistic centre, because of its great wealth. Cities such as Haarlem and Utrecht were more important in the first half of the century, with Leiden and other cities emerging after 1648, and above all Amsterdam, which increasingly drew to it artists from the rest of the Netherlands, as well as Flanders and Germany.

Dutch artists were strikingly less concerned about artistic theory than those of many nations, and less given to discussing their art; it appears that there was also much less interest in artistic theory in general intellectual circles and among the wider public than was by then common in Italy. As nearly all commissions and sales were private, and between bourgeois individuals whose accounts have not been preserved, these are also less well documented than elsewhere. But Dutch art was a source of national pride, and the major biographers are crucial sources of information. These are Karel van Mander (Het Schilderboeck, 1604), who essentially covers the previous century, and Arnold Houbraken (De groote schouburgh der Nederlantsche konstschilders en schilderessen – "The Great Theatre of Dutch Painters", 1718–21). Both followed, and indeed exceeded, Vasari in including a great number of short lives of artists – over 500 in Houbraken's case – and both are considered generally accurate on factual matters.

The German artist Joachim von Sandrart (1606–1688) had worked for periods in Holland, and his Deutsche Akademie in the same format covers many Dutch artists he knew. Houbraken's master, and Rembrandt's pupil, was Samuel van Hoogstraten (1627–1678), whose Zichtbare wereld and Inleyding tot de Hooge Schoole der Schilderkonst (1678) contain more critical than biographical information and are among the most important treatises on painting of the period. Like other Dutch works on the theory of art, they expound many commonplaces of Renaissance theory and do not entirely reflect contemporary Dutch art, still often concentrating on history painting.

== History painting ==
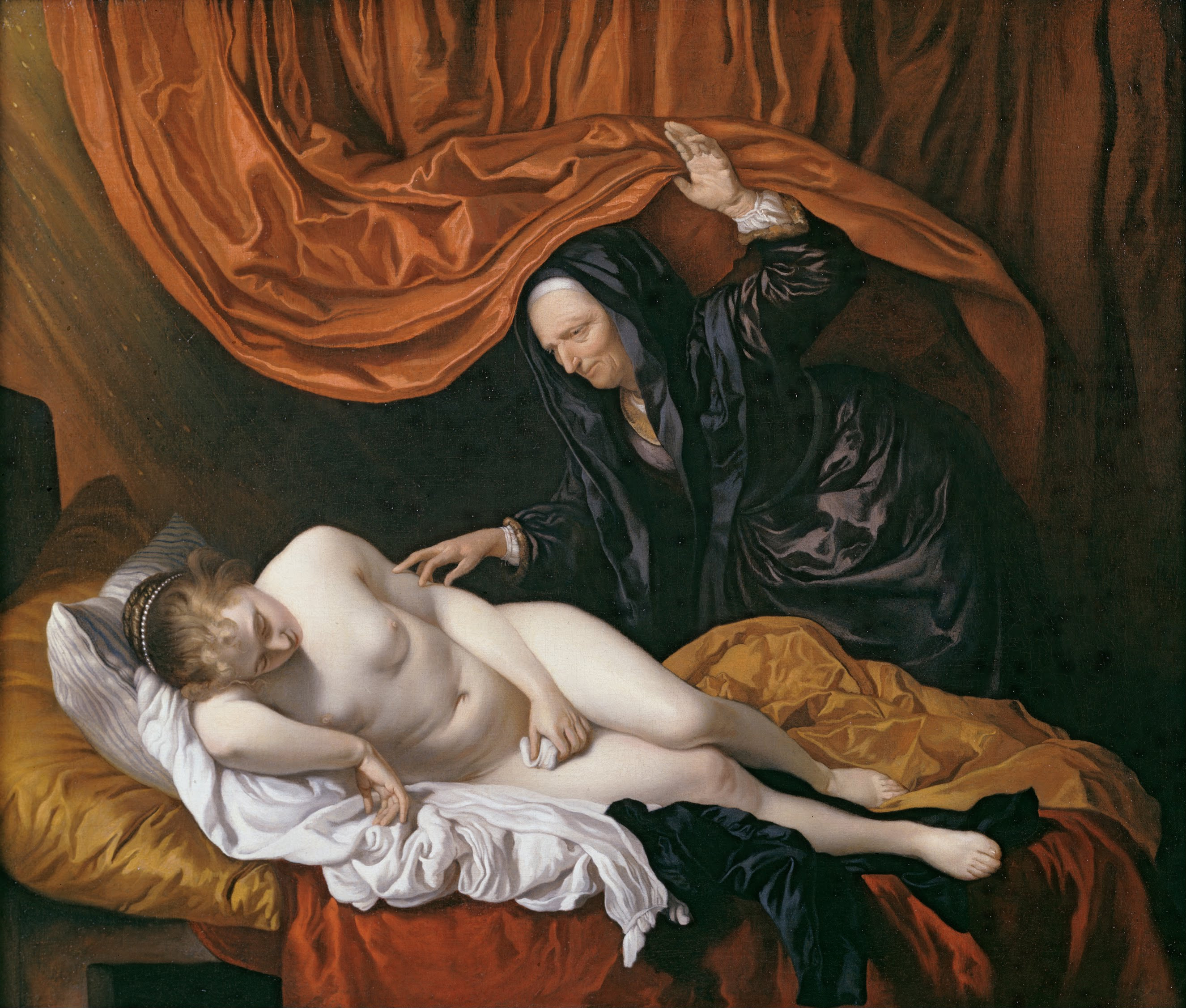
Jacob van Loo, Danaë (compare Rembrandt's treatment)

This category comprises not only paintings that depicted historical events of the past, but also paintings that showed biblical, mythological, literary and allegorical scenes. Recent historical events essentially fell out of the category, and were treated in a realist fashion, as the appropriate combination of portraits with marine, townscape or landscape subjects. Large dramatic historical or Biblical scenes were produced less frequently than in other countries, as there was no local market for church art, and few large aristocratic Baroque houses to fill. More than that, the Protestant population of major cities had been exposed to some remarkably hypocritical uses of Mannerist allegory in unsuccessful Habsburg propaganda during the Dutch Revolt, which had produced a strong reaction towards realism and a distrust of grandiose visual rhetoric. History painting was now a "minority art", although to an extent this was redressed by a relatively keen interest in print versions of history subjects.

More than in other types of painting, Dutch history painters continued to be influenced by Italian painting. Prints and copies of Italian masterpieces circulated and suggested certain compositional schemes. The growing Dutch skill in the depiction of light was brought to bear on styles derived from Italy, notably that of Caravaggio. Some Dutch painters also travelled to Italy, though this was less common than with their Flemish contemporaries, as can be seen from the membership of the Bentvueghels club in Rome.

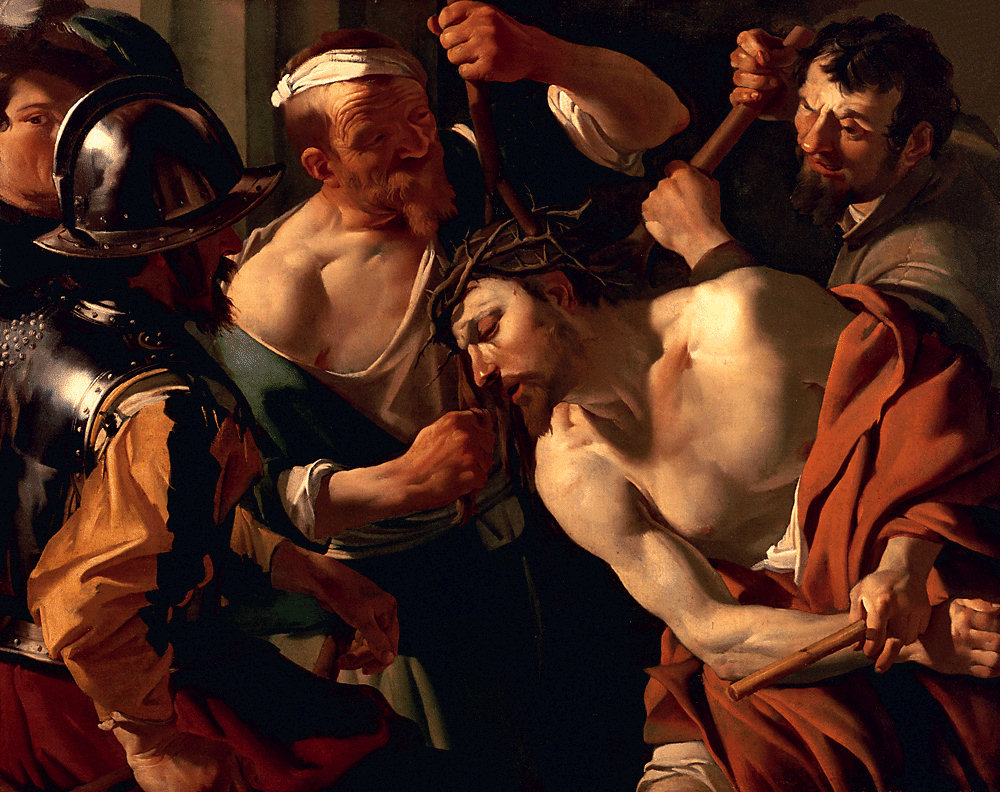
Utrecht Caravaggism: Dirck van Baburen, Christ crowned with thorns, 1623, for a convent in Utrecht, not a market available in most of Holland.

In the early part of the century many Northern Mannerist artists with styles formed in the previous century continued to work, until the 1630s in the cases of Abraham Bloemaert and Joachim Wtewael. Many history paintings were small in scale, with the German painter (based in Rome) Adam Elsheimer as much an influence as Caravaggio (both died in 1610) on Dutch painters like Pieter Lastman, Rembrandt's master, and Jan and Jacob Pynas. Compared to Baroque history painting from other countries, they shared the Dutch emphasis on realism, and narrative directness, and are sometimes known as the "Pre-Rembrandtists", as Rembrandt's early paintings were in this style.

Utrecht Caravaggism describes a group of artists who produced both history painting and generally large genre scenes in an Italian-influenced style, often making heavy use of chiaroscuro. Utrecht, before the revolt the most important city in the new Dutch territory, was an unusual Dutch city, still about 40% Catholic in the mid-century, even more among the elite groups, who included many rural nobility and gentry with town houses there. The leading artists were Hendrick ter Brugghen, Gerard van Honthorst and Dirck van Baburen, and the school was active about 1630, although van Honthorst continued until the 1650s as a successful court painter to the English, Dutch and Danish courts in a more classical style. The Oranjezaal hall in the Huis ten Bosch was painted in the mid-century by many artists from both parts of the Low Countries and represents a rare Dutch ensemble in a Baroque palace style.

Rembrandt began as a history painter before finding financial success as a portraitist, and he never relinquished his ambitions in this area. A great number of his etchings are of narrative religious scenes, and the story of his last history commission, The Conspiracy of Claudius Civilis (1661) illustrates both his commitment to the form and the difficulties he had in finding an audience. Several artists, many his pupils, attempted with some success to continue his very personal style; Govaert Flinck was the most successful. Gerard de Lairesse (1640–1711) was another of these, before falling under heavy influence from French classicism, and becoming its leading Dutch proponent as both artist and theoretician.

Nudity was effectively the preserve of the history painter, although many portraitists dressed up their occasional nudes (nearly always female) with a classical title, as Rembrandt did. For all their uninhibited suggestiveness, genre painters rarely revealed more than a generous cleavage or stretch of thigh, usually when painting prostitutes or "Italian" peasants.

== Portraits ==
Bartholomeus van der Helst, Sophia Trip (1645), a member of one of the wealthiest families in Holland.

Portrait painting thrived in the Netherlands in the 17th century, as there was a large mercantile class who were far more ready to commission portraits than their equivalents in other countries; a summary of various estimates of total production arrives at between 750,000 and 1,100,000 portraits. Rembrandt enjoyed his greatest period of financial success as a young Amsterdam portraitist, but like other artists, grew rather bored with painting commissioned portraits of burghers: "artists travel along this road without delight", according to van Mander.

While Dutch portrait painting avoids the swagger and excessive rhetoric of the aristocratic Baroque portraiture current in the rest of 17th-century Europe, the sombre clothing of male and in many cases female sitters, and the Calvinist feeling that the inclusion of props, possessions or views of land in the background would show the sin of pride leads to an undeniable sameness in many Dutch portraits, for all their technical quality. Even a standing pose is usually avoided, as a full-length might also show pride. Poses are undemonstrative, especially for women, though children may be allowed more freedom. The classic moment for having a portrait painted was upon marriage, when the new husband and wife more often than not occupied separate frames in a pair of paintings. Rembrandt's later portraits compel by force of characterization, and sometimes a narrative element, but even his early portraits can be dispiriting en masse, as in the roomful of 'starter Rembrandts' donated to the Metropolitan Museum of Art in New York.

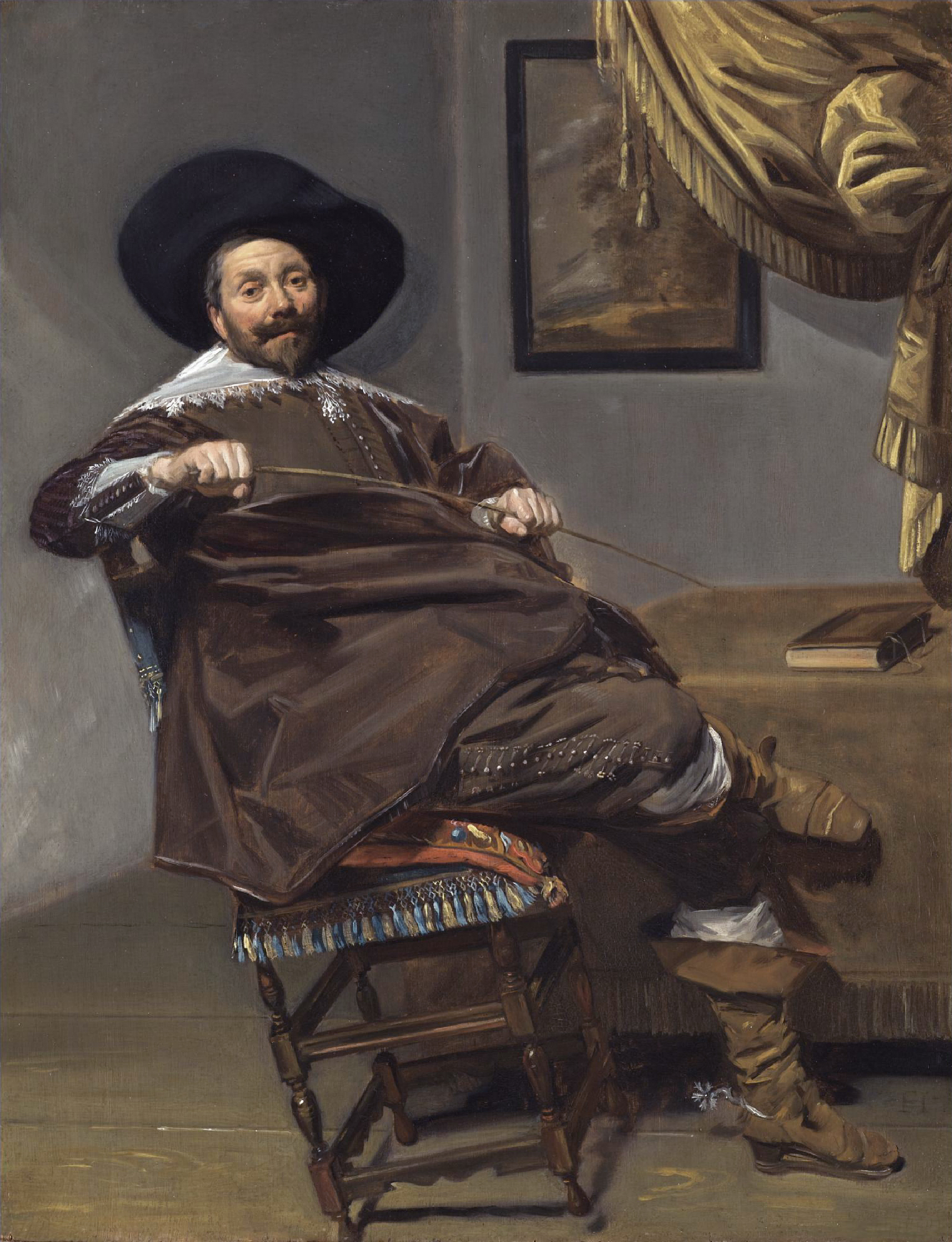
Frans Hals, Willem Heythuijsen (1634), 47 cm × 37 cm (19 in × 15 in).

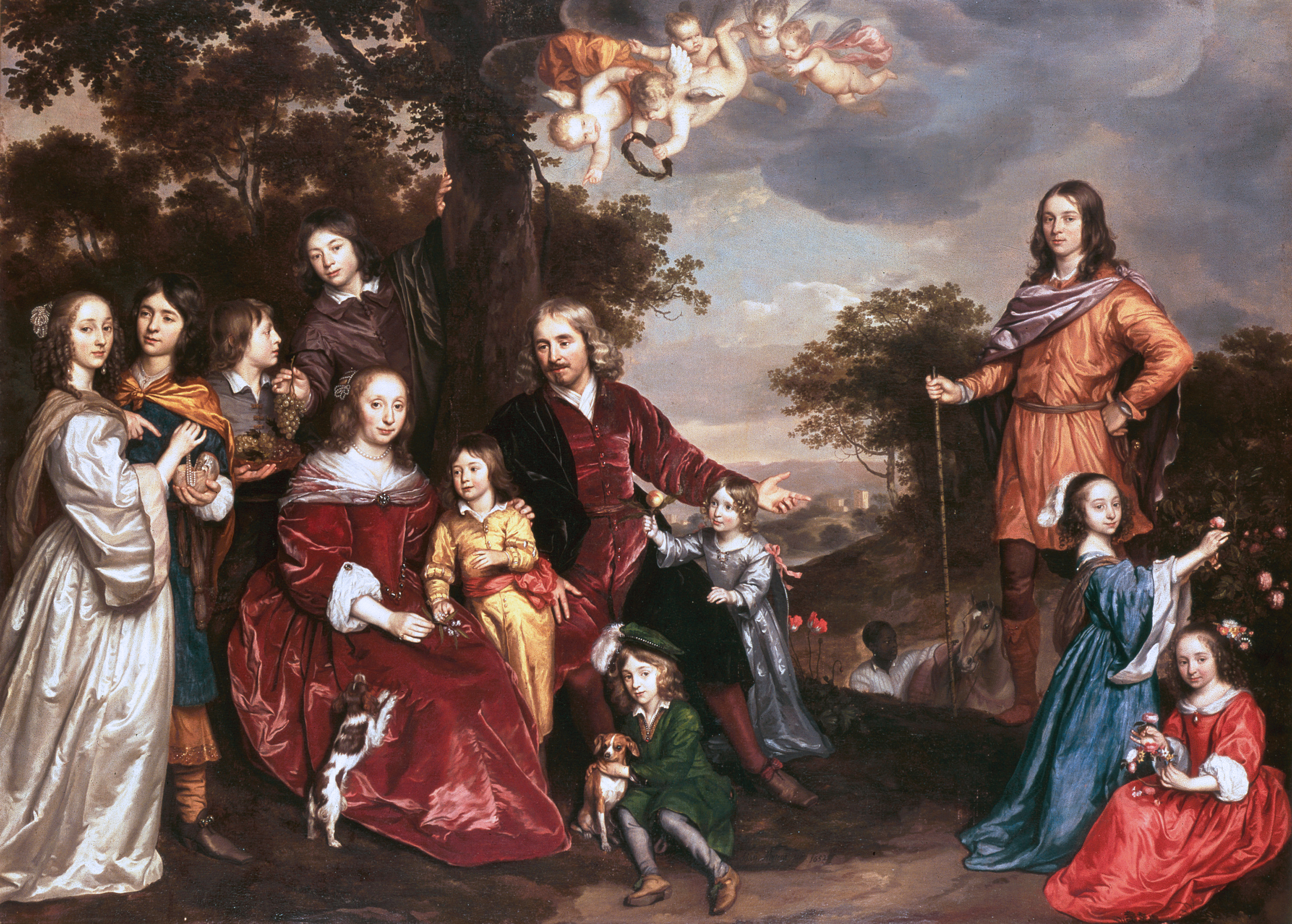
Jan Mijtens, family portrait, 1652, with the boys in "picturesque" dress

The other great portraitist of the period is Frans Hals, whose famously lively brushwork and ability to show sitters looking relaxed and cheerful adds excitement to even the most unpromising subjects. The extremely "nonchalant pose" of his portrait of Willem Heythuijsen is exceptional: "no other portrait from this period is so informal". The sitter was a wealthy textile merchant who had already commissioned Hals' only individual life-sized full-length portrait ten years before. In this much smaller work for a private chamber he wears riding clothes. Jan de Bray encouraged his sitters to pose costumed as figures from classical history, but many of his works are of his own family. Thomas de Keyser, Bartholomeus van der Helst, Ferdinand Bol and others, including many mentioned below as history or genre painters, did their best to enliven more conventional works. Portraiture, less affected by fashion than other types of painting, remained the safe fallback for Dutch artists.

From what little we know of the studio procedures of artists, it seems that, as elsewhere in Europe, the face was probably drawn and perhaps painted at an initial sitting or two. The typical number of further sittings is unclear – between zero (for a Rembrandt full-length) and 50 appear documented. The clothes were left at the studio and might well be painted by assistants, or a brought-in specialist master, although, or because, they were regarded as a very important part of the painting. Married and never-married women can be distinguished by their dress, highlighting how few single women were painted, except in family groups. As elsewhere, the accuracy of the clothes shown is variable – striped and patterned clothes were worn, but artists rarely show them, understandably avoiding the extra work. Lace and ruff collars were unavoidable and presented a formidable challenge to painters' intent on realism. Rembrandt evolved a more effective way of painting patterned lace, laying in broad white stokes, and then painting lightly in black to show the pattern. Another way of doing this was to paint in white over a black layer and scratch off the white with the end of the brush to show the pattern.

At the end of the century there was a fashion for showing sitters in a semi-fancy dress, begun in England by van Dyck in the 1630s, known as "picturesque" or "Roman" dress. Aristocratic, and militia, sitters allowed themselves more freedom in bright dress and expansive settings than burghers, and religious affiliations probably affected many depictions. By the end of the century aristocratic, or French, values were spreading among the burghers, and depictions were allowed more freedom and display.

A distinctive type of painting, combining elements of the portrait, history, and genre painting was the tronie. This was usually a half-length of a single figure which concentrated on capturing an unusual mood or expression. The actual identity of the model was not supposed to be important, but they might represent a historical figure and be in exotic or historic costume. Jan Lievens and Rembrandt, many of whose self-portraits are also tronies (especially his etched ones), were among those who developed the genre.

Family portraits tended, as in Flanders, to be set outdoors in gardens, but without an extensive view as later in England, and to be relatively informal in dress and mood. Group portraits, largely a Dutch invention, were popular among the large numbers of civic associations that were a notable part of Dutch life, such as the officers of a city's schutterij or militia guards, boards of trustees and regents of guilds and charitable foundations and the like. Especially in the first half of the century, portraits were very formal and stiff in composition. Groups were often seated around a table, each person looking at the viewer. Much attention was paid to fine details in clothing, and where applicable, to furniture and other signs of a person's position in society. Later in the century groups became livelier and colours brighter. Rembrandt's Syndics of the Drapers' Guild is a subtle treatment of a group round a table.

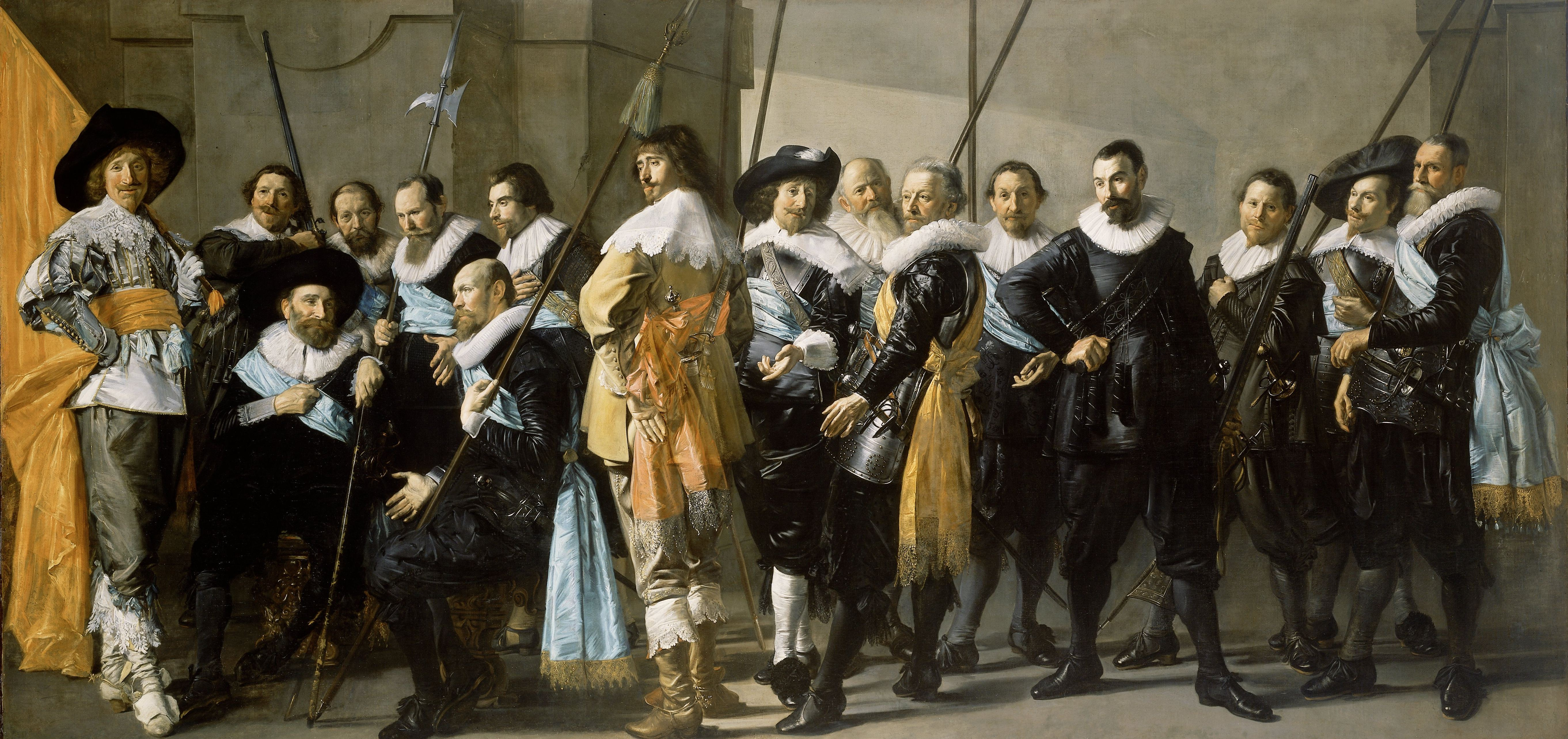
The Meagre Company, an Amsterdam militia group portrait or schutterstuk by Frans Hals and Pieter Codde (1633–37)

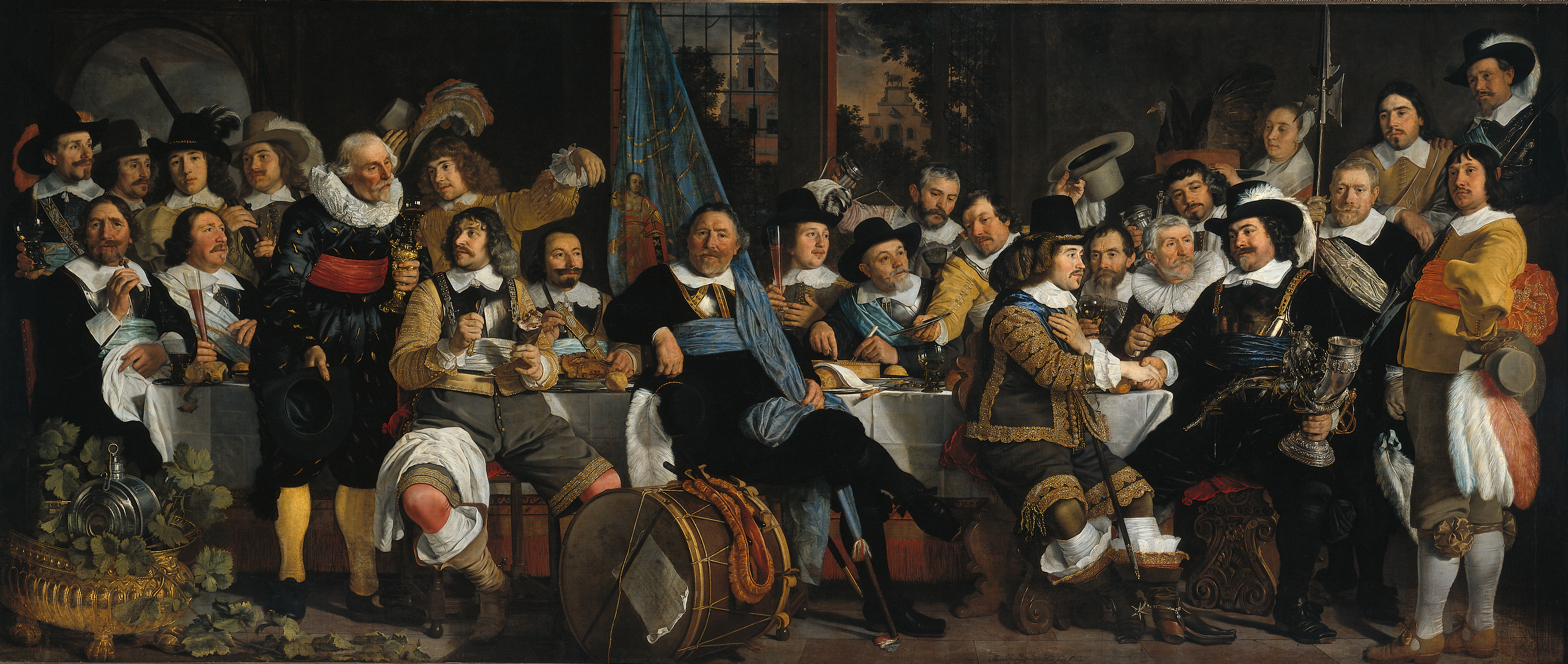
Bartholomeus van der Helst, Banquet of the Amsterdam Civic Guard in Celebration of the Peace of Münster, 1648; 5.47 metres wide

Scientists often posed with instruments and objects of their study around them. Physicians sometimes posed together around a cadaver, a so-called 'Anatomical Lesson', the most famous one being Rembrandt's Anatomy Lesson of Dr. Nicolaes Tulp (1632, Mauritshuis, The Hague). Boards of trustees in their regentenstuk portraits preferred an image of austerity and humility, posing in dark clothing (which by its refinement testified to their prominent standing in society), often seated around a table, with solemn expressions on their faces.

Most militia group portraits were commissioned in Haarlem and Amsterdam and were much more flamboyant and relaxed or even boisterous than other types of portraits, as well as much larger. Early examples showed them dining, but later groups showed most figures standing for a more dynamic composition. Rembrandt's famous The Militia Company of Captain Frans Banning Cocq better known as the Night Watch (1642), was an ambitious and not entirely successful attempt to show a group in action, setting out for a patrol or parade, also innovative in avoiding the typical very wide format of such works.

The cost of group portraits was usually shared by the subjects, often not equally. The amount paid might determine each person's place in the picture, either head to toe in full regalia in the foreground or face only in the back of the group. Sometimes all group members paid an equal sum, which was likely to lead to quarrels when some members gained a more prominent place in the picture than others. In Amsterdam most of these paintings would ultimately end up in the possession of the city council, and many are now on display in the Amsterdams Historisch Museum; there are no significant examples outside the Netherlands.

== Scenes of everyday life ==
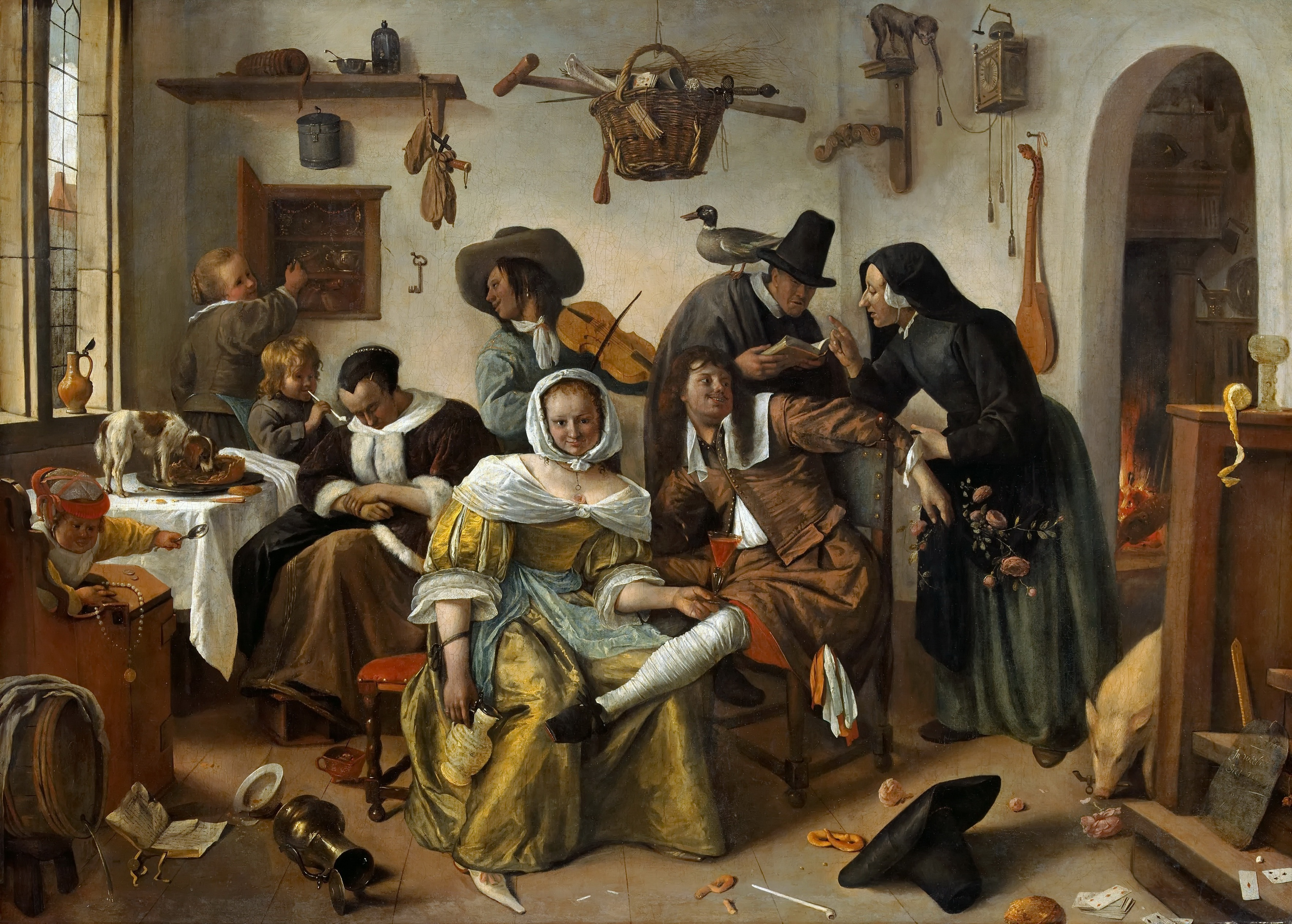
A typical Jan Steen picture (c. 1663); while the housewife sleeps, the household play

Scenes of everyday life, now called genre paintings, prominently feature figures to whom no specific identity can be attached – they are not portraits or intended as historical figures, but rather snapshots of quotidian life. Together with landscape painting, the development and enormous popularity of genre painting is the most distinctive feature of Dutch painting in this period, although in this case they were also very popular in Flemish painting. Many are single figures, such as Vermeer's The Milkmaid; others may show large groups at some social occasion, or crowds.

"Seventeenth-century Holland produced more and better artists dedicated to genre painting with and without messages than any other nation." There were a large number of sub-types within the genre: single figures, peasant families, tavern scenes, "merry company" parties, women at work about the house, scenes of village or town festivities (though these were still more common in Flemish painting), market scenes, barracks scenes, scenes with horses or farm animals, in snow, by moonlight, and many more. In fact, most of these had specific terms in Dutch, but there was no overall Dutch term equivalent to "genre painting" – until the late 18th century the English often called them "drolleries". Some artists worked mostly within one of these sub-types, especially after about 1625. Over the course of the century, genre paintings tended to reduce in size.

Though genre paintings provide many insights into the daily life of 17th-century citizens of all classes, their accuracy cannot always be taken for granted. Typically they show what art historians term a "reality effect" rather than an actual realist depiction; the degree to which this is the case varies between artists. Many paintings which seem only to depict everyday scenes actually illustrated Dutch proverbs and sayings or conveyed a moralistic message – the meaning of which may now need to be deciphered by art historians, though some are clear enough. Many artists, and no doubt purchasers, certainly tried to have things both ways, enjoying the depiction of disorderly households or brothel scenes, while providing a moral interpretation – the works of Jan Steen, whose other profession was as an innkeeper, are an example. The balance between these elements is still debated by art historians today.

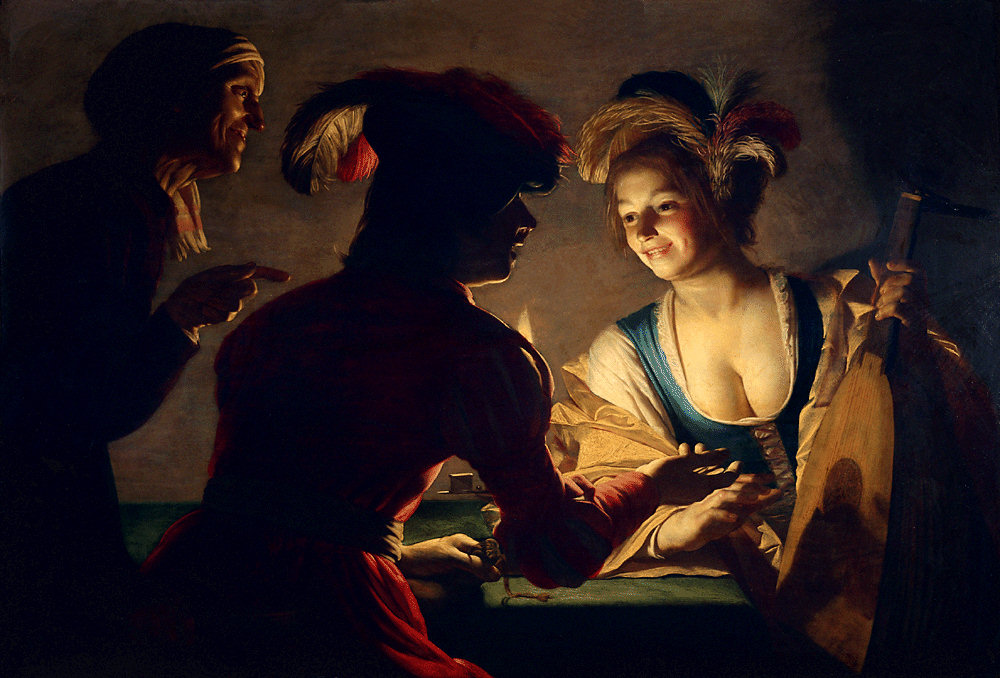
Gerrit van Honthorst (1625), punning visually on the lute in this brothel scene

The titles given later to paintings often distinguish between "taverns" or "inns" and "brothels", but in practice these were very often the same establishments, as many taverns had rooms above or behind set aside for sexual purposes: "Inn in front; brothel behind" was a Dutch proverb.

The Steen above is very clearly an exemplum, and though each of the individual components of it is realistically depicted, the overall scene is not a plausible depiction of a real moment; typically, of genre painting, it is a situation that is depicted, and satirized.

The Renaissance tradition of recondite emblem books had, in the hands of the 17th-century Dutch – almost universally literate in the vernacular, but mostly without education in the classics – turned into the popularist and highly moralistic works of Jacob Cats, Roemer Visscher, and others, often based in popular proverbs. The illustrations to these are often quoted directly in paintings, and since the start of the 20th century art historians have attached proverbs, sayings and mottoes to a great number of genre works. Another popular source of meaning is visual puns using the great number of Dutch slang terms in the sexual area: the vagina could be represented by a lute (luit) or stocking (kous), and sex by a bird (vogelen), among many other options, and purely visual symbols such as shoes, spouts, and jugs and flagons on their side.

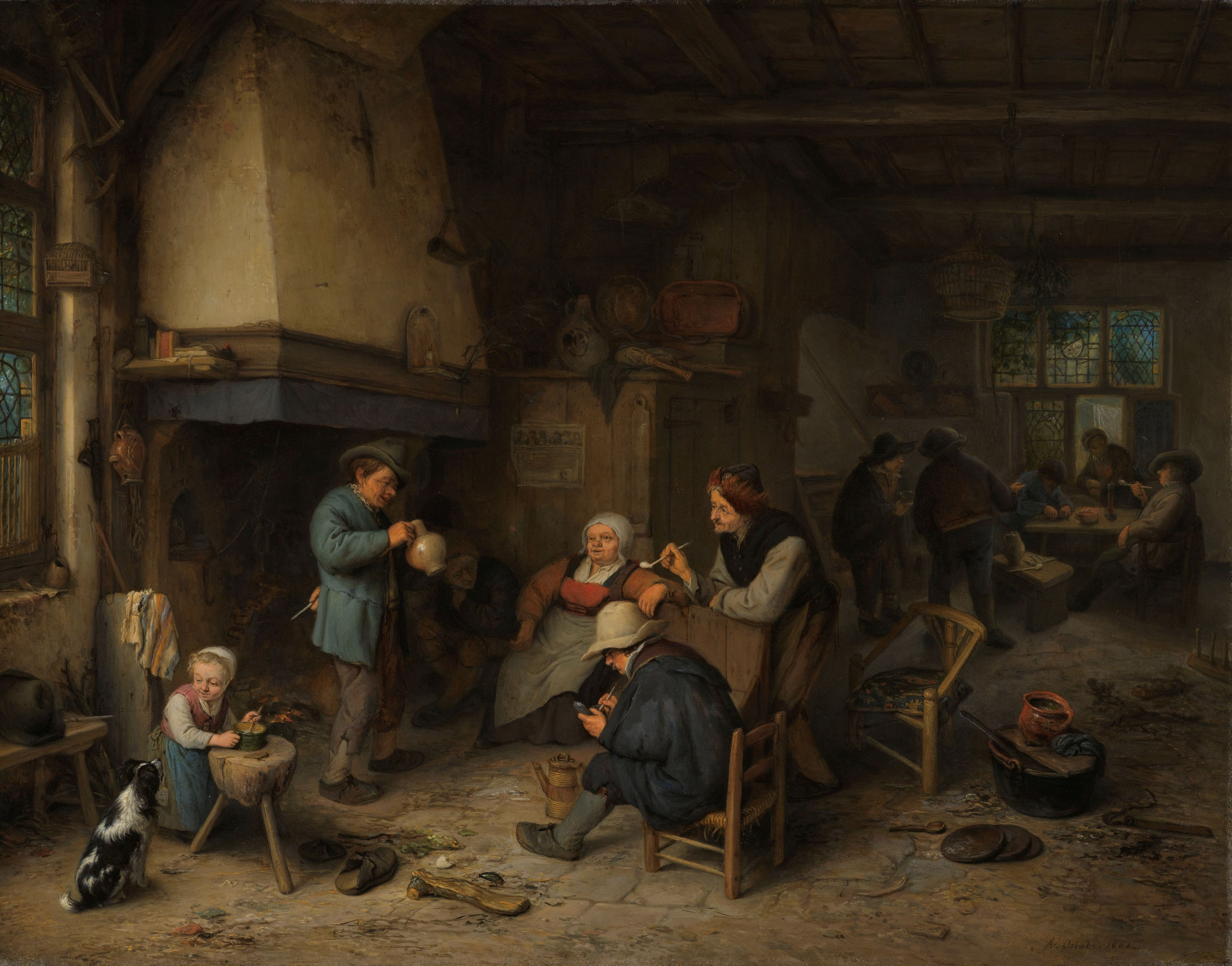
Adriaen van Ostade, Peasants in an Interior (1661)

The same painters often painted works in a very different spirit of housewives or other women at rest in the home or at work – they massively outnumber similar treatments of men. In fact, working-class men going about their jobs are notably absent from Dutch Golden Age art, with landscapes populated by travellers and idlers but rarely tillers of the soil. Despite the Dutch Republic being the most important nation in international trade in Europe, and the abundance of marine paintings, scenes of dock workers and other commercial activities are very rare. This group of subjects was a Dutch invention, reflecting the cultural preoccupations of the age, and was to be adopted by artists from other countries, especially France, in the two centuries following.

The tradition developed from the realism and detailed background activity of Early Netherlandish painting, which Hieronymus Bosch and Pieter Bruegel the Elder were among the first to turn into their principal subjects, also making use of proverbs. The Haarlem painters Willem Pieterszoon Buytewech, Frans Hals and Esaias van de Velde were important painters early in the period. Buytewech painted "merry companies" of finely dressed young people, with moralistic significance lurking in the detail.

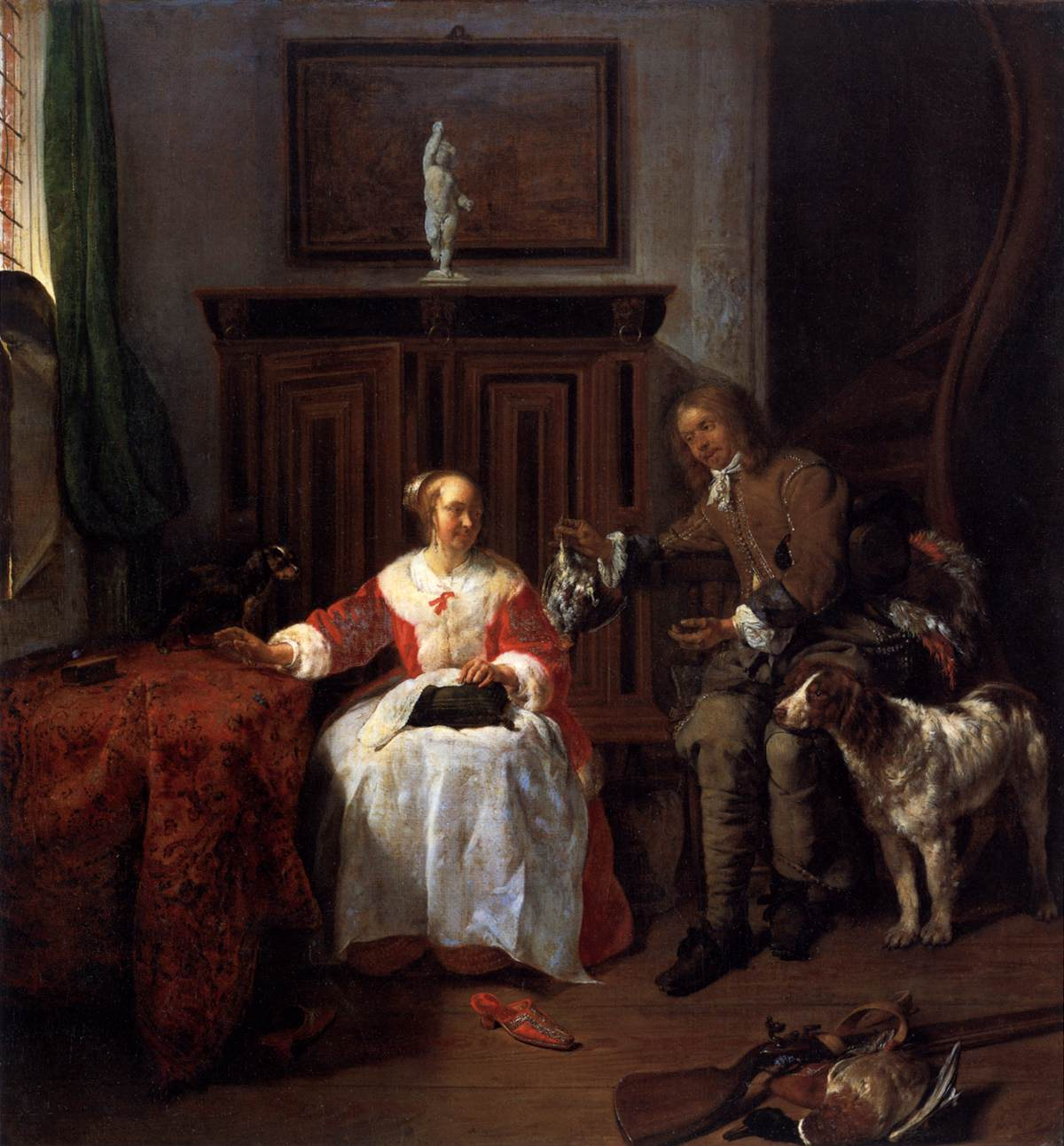
Gabriel Metsu, The Hunter's Gift, c. 1660, a study in marital relations, with a visual pun.

Van de Velde was also important as a landscapist, whose scenes included unglamorous figures very different from those in his genre paintings, which were typically set at garden parties in country houses. Hals was principally a portraitist, but also painted genre figures of a portrait size early in his career.

A stay in Haarlem by the Flemish master of peasant tavern scenes Adriaen Brouwer, from 1625 or 1626, gave Adriaen van Ostade his lifelong subject, though he often took a more sentimental approach. Before Brouwer, peasants had normally been depicted outdoors; he usually shows them in a plain and dim interior, though van Ostade's sometimes occupy ostentatiously decrepit farmhouses of enormous size.

Van Ostade was as likely to paint a single figure as a group, as were the Utrecht Caravaggisti in their genre works, and the single figure, or small groups of two or three became increasingly common, especially those including women and children. The most notable woman artist of the period, Judith Leyster (1609–1660), specialized in these, before her husband, Jan Miense Molenaer, prevailed on her to give up painting. The Leiden school of fijnschilder ("fine painters") were renowned for small and highly finished paintings, many of this type. Leading artists included Gerard Dou, Gabriel Metsu, Frans van Mieris the Elder, and later his son Willem van Mieris, Godfried Schalcken, and Adriaen van der Werff.

This later generation, whose work now seems over-refined compared to their predecessors, also painted portraits and histories, and were the most highly regarded and rewarded Dutch painters by the end of the period, whose works were sought after all over Europe. Genre paintings reflected the increasing prosperity of Dutch society, and settings grew steadily more comfortable, opulent and carefully depicted as the century progressed. Artists not part of the Leiden group whose common subjects also were more intimate genre groups included Nicolaes Maes, Gerard ter Borch and Pieter de Hooch, whose interest in light in interior scenes was shared with Jan Vermeer, long a very obscure figure, but now the most highly regarded genre painter of all.

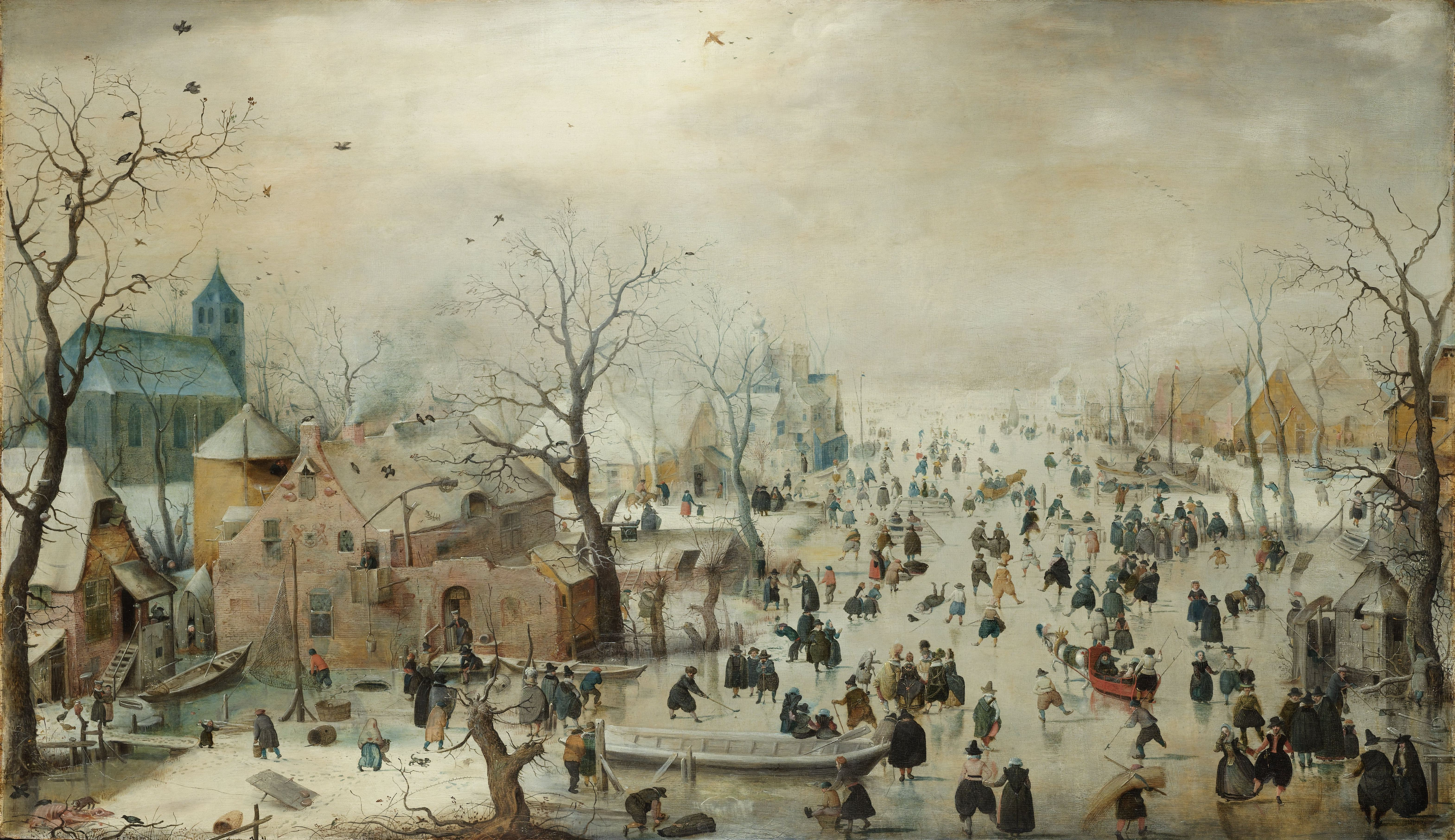
The mute Hendrick Avercamp painted almost exclusively winter scenes of crowds seen from some distance.

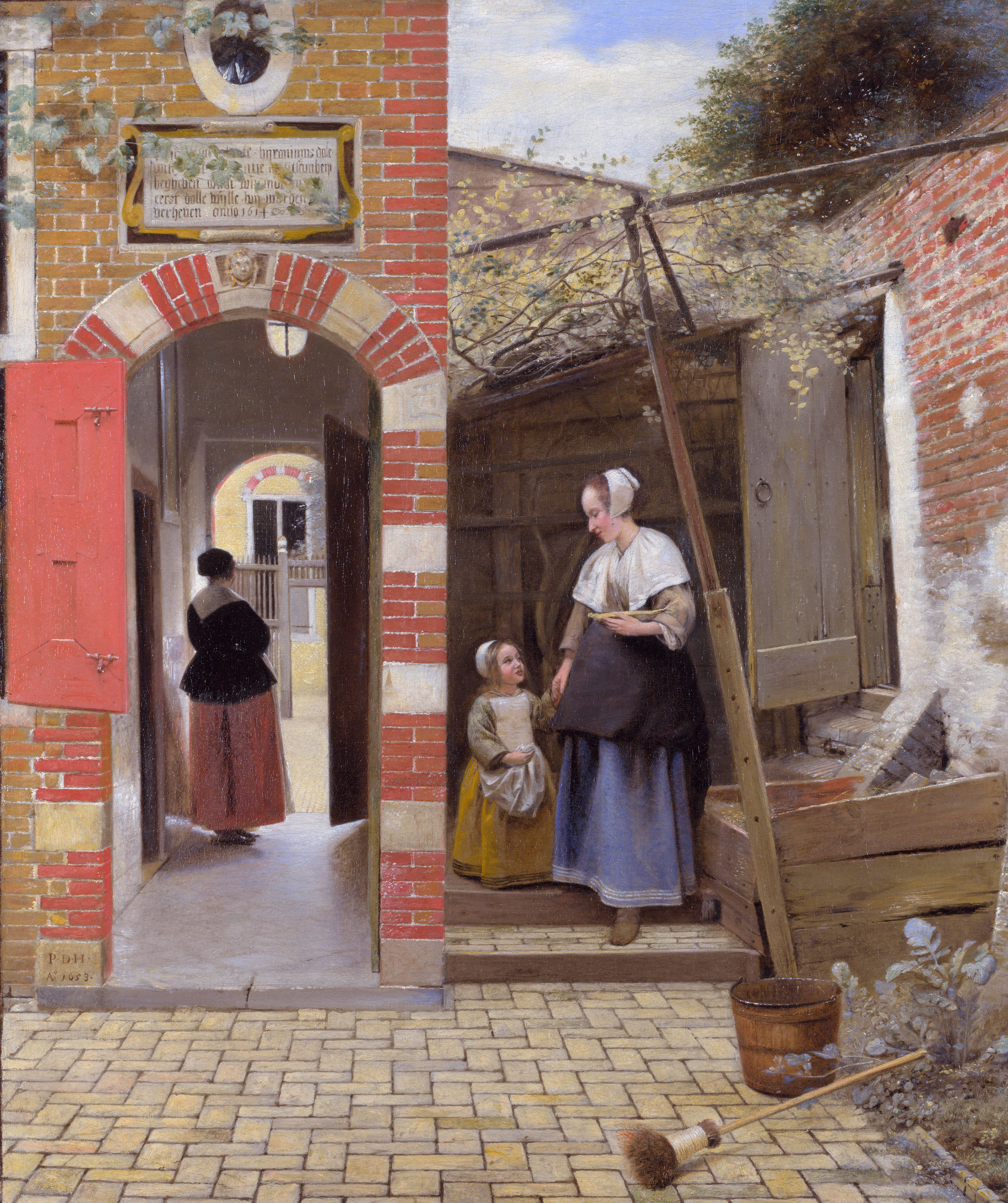
Pieter de Hooch, Courtyard of a House in Delft, 1658, a study in domestic virtue, texture and spatial complexity. The woman is a servant.

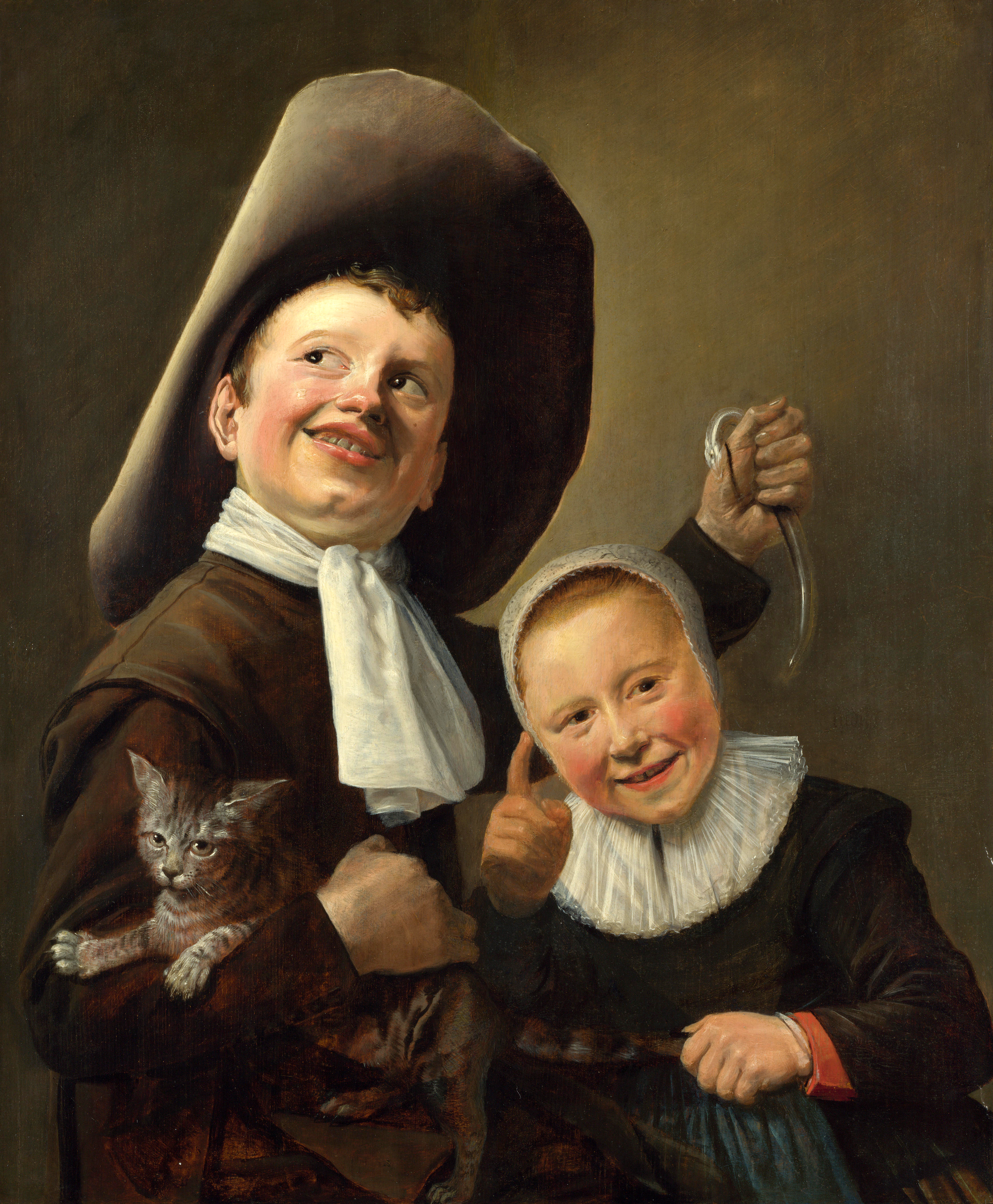
Judith Leyster, A Boy and a Girl with a Cat and an Eel; various references to proverbs or emblems have been suggested.

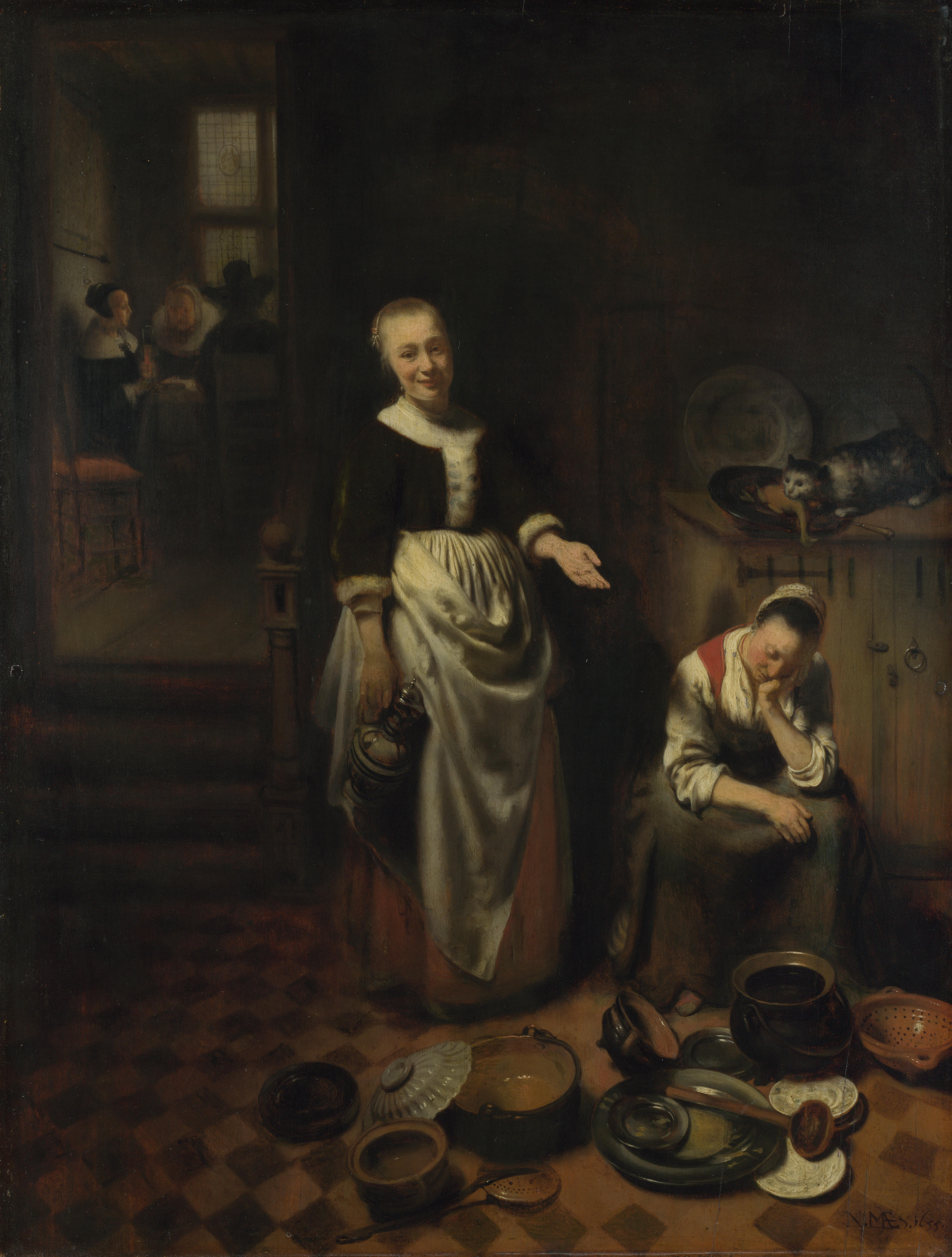
Nicolaes Maes, The idle servant; housemaid troubles were the subject of several of Maes' works.

== Landscapes and cityscapes ==
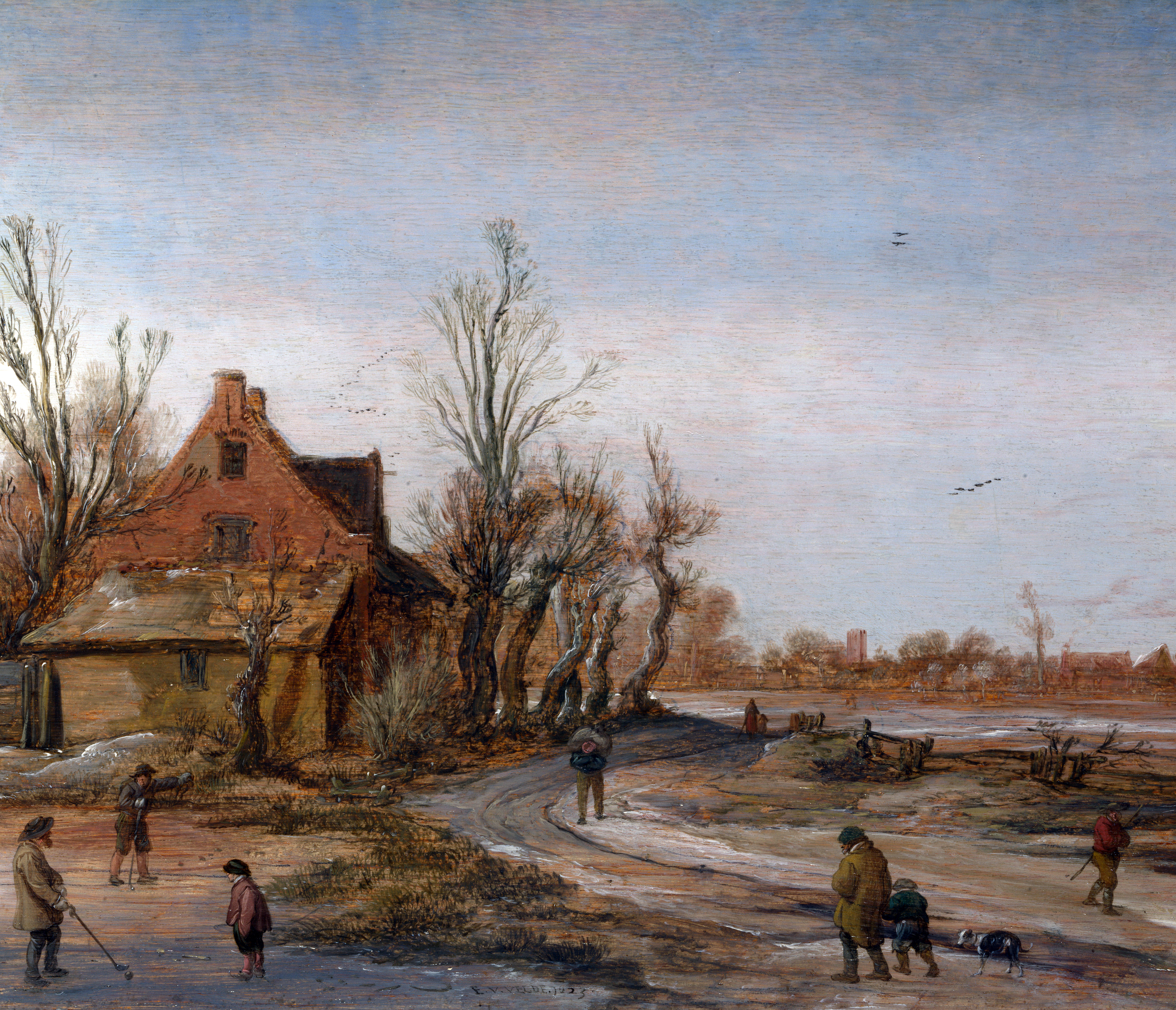
Esaias van de Velde, Winter Landscape (1623)

Landscape painting was a major genre in the 17th century. Flemish landscapes (particularly from Antwerp) of the 16th century first served as an example. These had been not particularly realistic, having been painted mostly in the studio, partly from imagination, and often still using the semi-aerial view from above typical of earlier Netherlandish landscape painting in the "world landscape" tradition of Joachim Patinir, Herri met de Bles and the early Pieter Bruegel the Elder. A more realistic Dutch landscape style developed, seen from ground level, often based on drawings made outdoors, with lower horizons which made it possible to emphasize the often impressive cloud formations that were (and are) so typical in the climate of the region, and which cast a particular light. Favourite subjects were the dunes along the western seacoast, rivers with their broad adjoining meadows where cattle grazed, often with the silhouette of a city in the distance. Winter landscapes with frozen canals and creeks also abounded. The sea was a favourite topic as well since the Low Countries depended on it for trade, battled with it for new land, and battled on it with competing nations.

Important early figures in the move to realism were Esaias van de Velde (1587–1630) and Hendrick Avercamp (1585–1634), both also mentioned above as genre painters – in Avercamp's case the same paintings deserve mention in each category. From the late 1620s the "tonal phase" of landscape painting started, as artists softened or blurred their outlines, and concentrated on an atmospheric effect, with great prominence given to the sky, and human figures usually either absent or small and distant. Compositions based on a diagonal across the picture space became popular, and water often featured. The leading artists were Jan van Goyen (1596–1656), Salomon van Ruysdael (1602–1670), Pieter de Molyn (1595–1661), and in marine painting Simon de Vlieger (1601–1653), with a host of minor figures – a recent study lists over 75 artists who worked in van Goyen's manner for at least a period, including Cuyp.

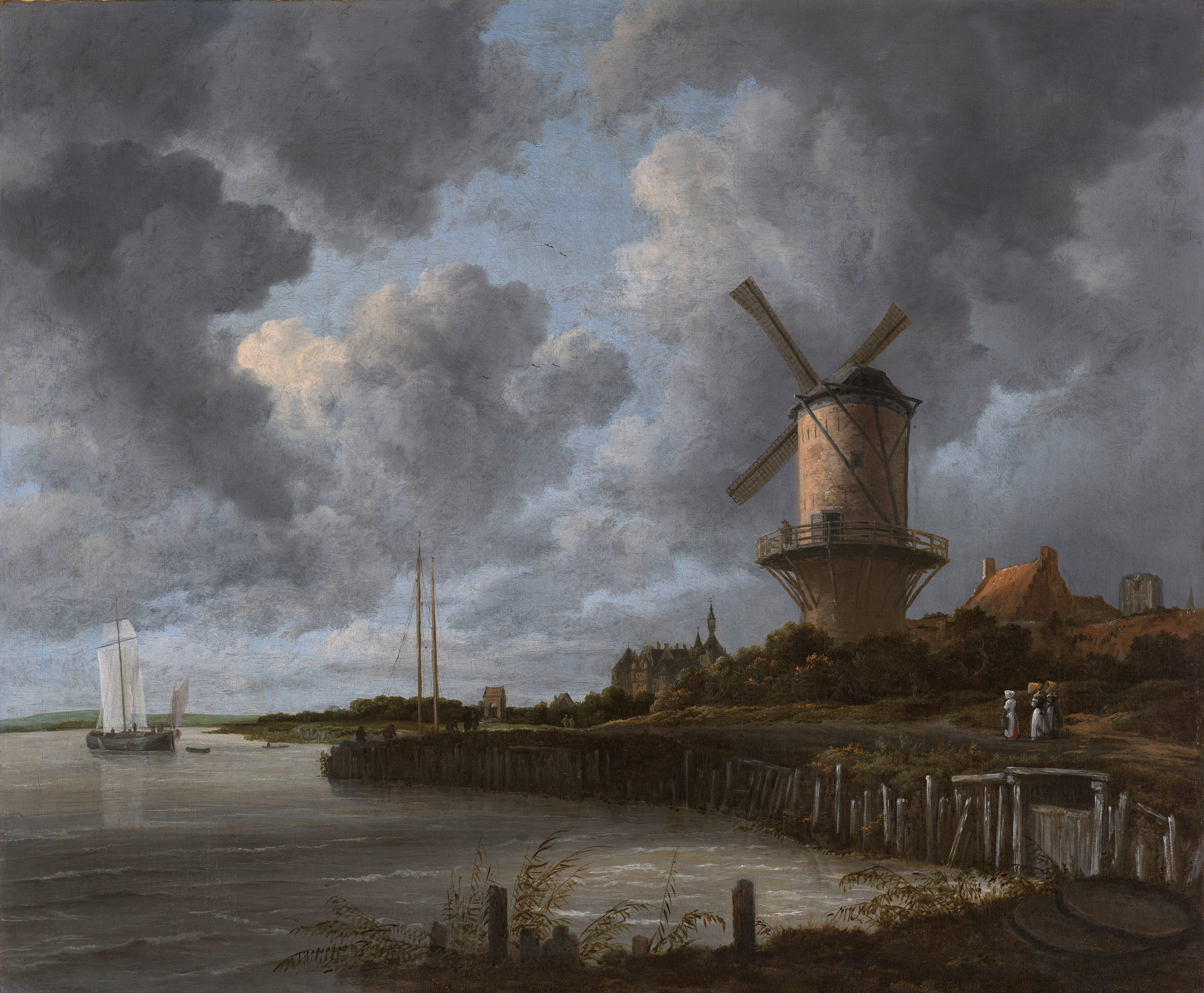
Jacob van Ruisdael, The Windmill at Wijk (1670)

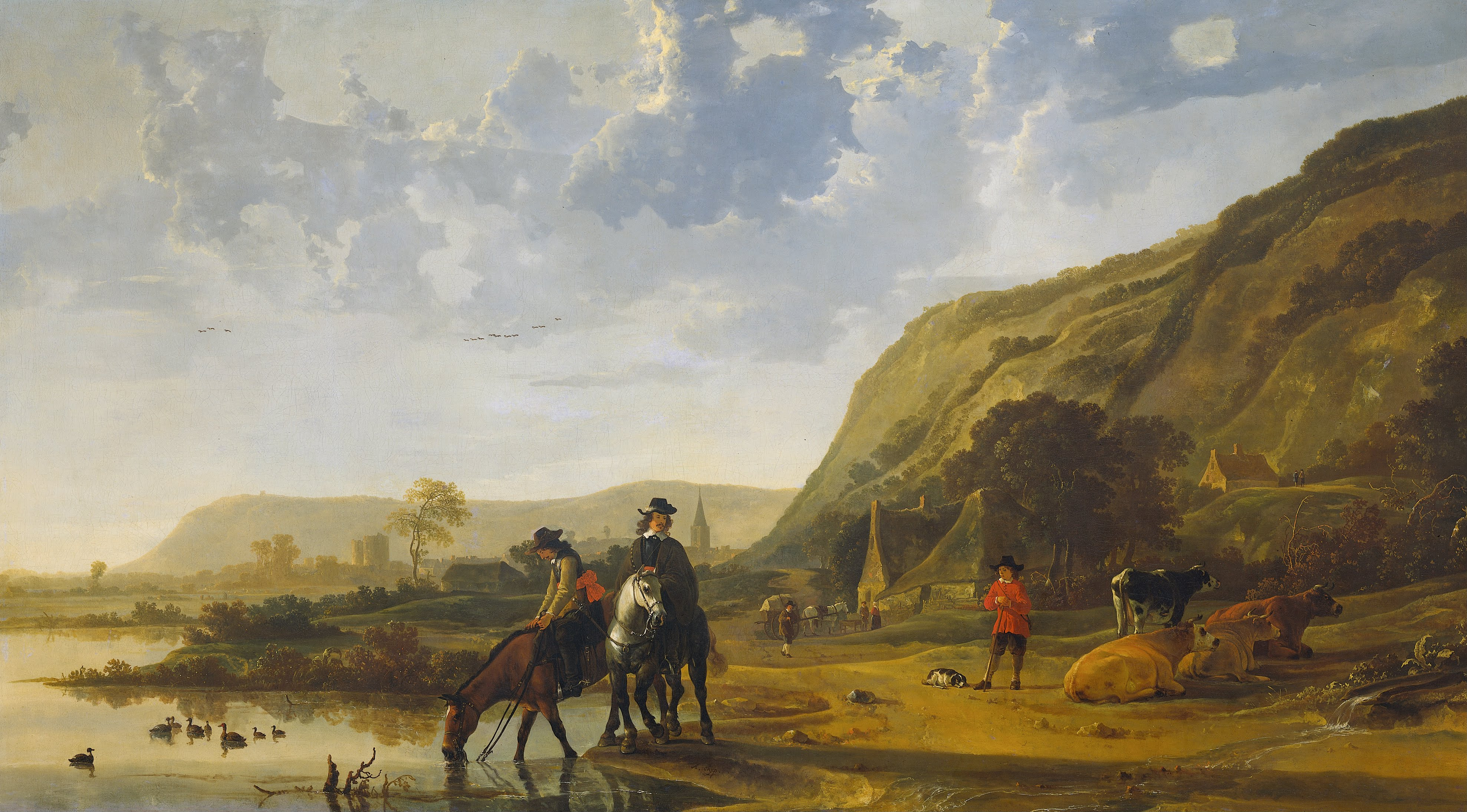
Aelbert Cuyp, River landscape with Riders (c. 1655); Cuyp specialized in golden evening light in Dutch settings

From the 1650s the "classical phase" began, retaining the atmospheric quality, but with more expressive compositions and stronger contrasts of light and colour. Compositions are often anchored by a single "heroic tree", windmill or tower, or ship in marine works. The leading artist was Jacob van Ruisdael (1628–1682), who produced a great quantity and variety of work, using every typical Dutch subject except the Italianate landscape (below); instead, he produced "Nordic" landscapes of dark and dramatic mountain pine forests with rushing torrents and waterfalls.

His pupil was Meindert Hobbema (1638–1709), best known for his atypical Avenue at Middelharnis (1689, London), a departure from his usual scenes of watermills and roads through woods. Two other artists with more personal styles, whose best work included larger pictures (up to a metre or more across), were Aelbert Cuyp (1620–1691) and Philips Koninck (1619–1688). Cuyp took golden Italian light and used it in evening scenes with a group of figures in the foreground and behind them a river and wide landscape. Koninck's best works are panoramic views, as from a hill, over wide flat farmlands, with a huge sky.

A different type of landscape, produced throughout the tonal and classical phases, was the romantic Italianate landscape, typically in more mountainous settings than are found in the Netherlands, with golden light, and sometimes picturesque Mediterranean staffage and ruins. Not all the artists who specialized in these had visited Italy. Jan Both (d. 1652), who had been to Rome and worked with Claude Lorrain, was a leading developer of the subgenre, which influenced the work of many painters of landscapes with Dutch settings, such as Aelbert Cuyp. Other artists who consistently worked in the style were Nicolaes Berchem (1620–1683) and Adam Pijnacker. Italianate landscapes were popular as prints, and more paintings by Berchem were reproduced in engravings during the period itself than those of any other artist.

A number of other artists do not fit in any of these groups, above all Rembrandt, whose relatively few painted landscapes show various influences, including some from Hercules Seghers (c. 1589–c. 1638); his very rare large mountain valley landscapes were a very personal development of 16th-century styles. Aert van der Neer (d. 1677) painted very small scenes of rivers at night or under ice and snow.

Landscapes with animals in the foreground were a distinct sub-type, and were painted by Cuyp, Paulus Potter (1625–1654), Albert Jansz. Klomp (1625–1688), Adriaen van de Velde (1636–1672) and Karel Dujardin (1626–1678, farm animals), with Philips Wouwerman painting horses and riders in various settings. The cow was a symbol of prosperity to the Dutch, hitherto overlooked in art, and apart from the horse by far the most commonly shown animal; goats were used to indicate Italy. Potter's The Young Bull is an enormous and famous portrait which Napoleon took to Paris (it later returned) though livestock analysts have noted from the depiction of the various parts of the anatomy that it appears to be a composite of studies of six different animals of widely different ages.

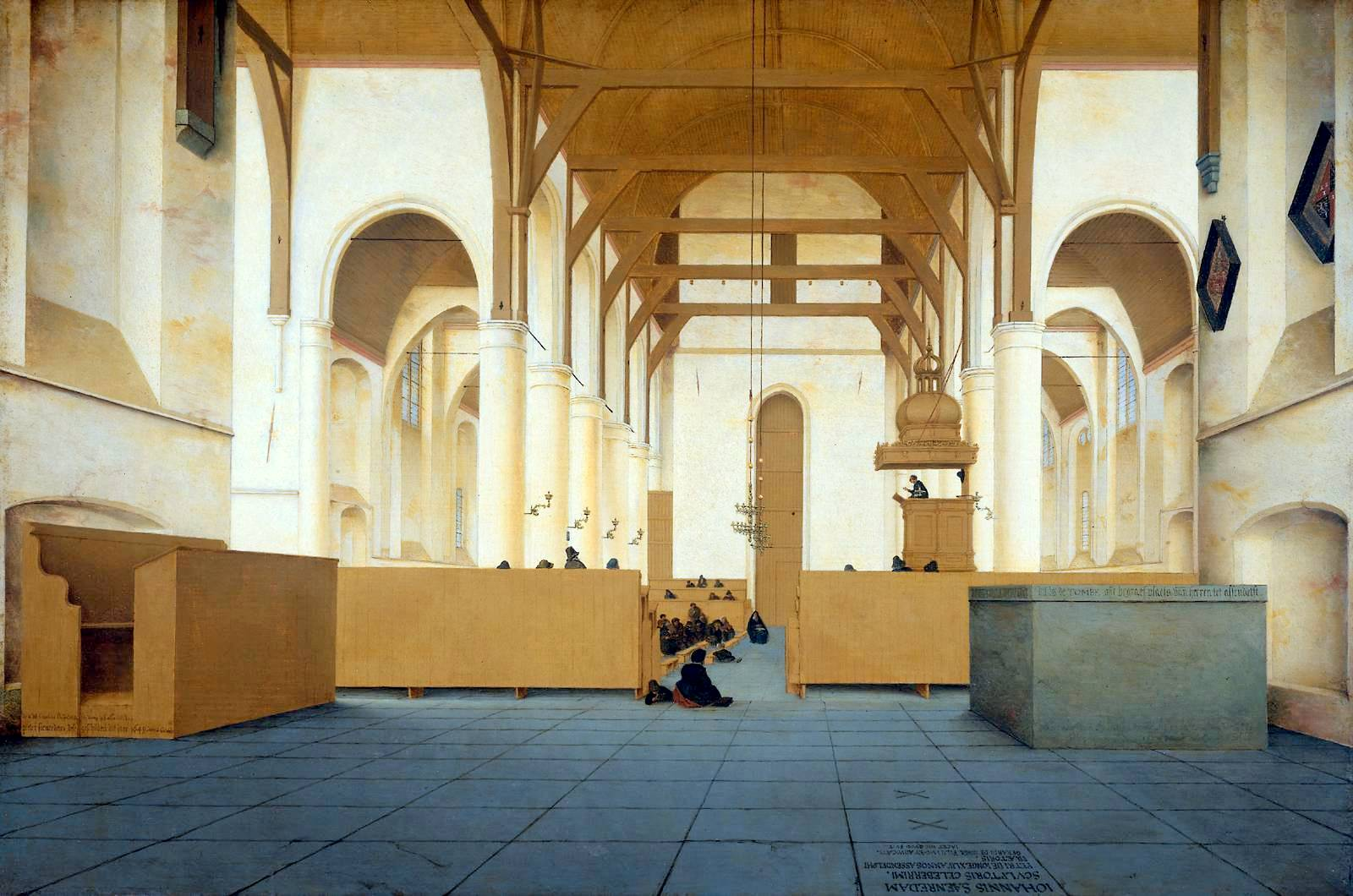
Pieter Jansz Saenredam, Assendelft Church, 1649, with the gravestone of his father in the foreground

Architecture also fascinated the Dutch, churches in particular. At the start of the period the main tradition was of fanciful palaces and city views of invented Northern Mannerist architecture, which Flemish painting continued to develop, and in Holland was represented by Dirck van Delen. A greater realism began to appear, and the exteriors and interiors of actual buildings were reproduced, though not always faithfully. During the century understanding of the proper rendering of perspective grew and were enthusiastically applied. Several artists specialized in church interiors.

Pieter Jansz Saenredam, whose father Jan Saenredam engraved sensuous nude Mannerist goddesses, painted unpeopled views of now whitewashed Gothic city churches. His emphasis on even light and geometry, with little depiction of surface textures, is brought out by comparing his works with those of Emanuel de Witte, who left in the people, uneven floors, contrasts of light and such clutter of church furniture as remained in Calvinist churches, all usually ignored by Saenredam. Gerard Houckgeest, followed by van Witte and Hendrick van Vliet, had supplemented the traditional view along a main axis of the church with diagonal views that added drama and interest.

Gerrit Berckheyde specialized in lightly populated views of main city streets, squares, and major public buildings; Jan van der Heyden preferred more intimate scenes of quieter Amsterdam streets, often with trees and canals. These were real views, but he did not hesitate to adjust them for compositional effect.

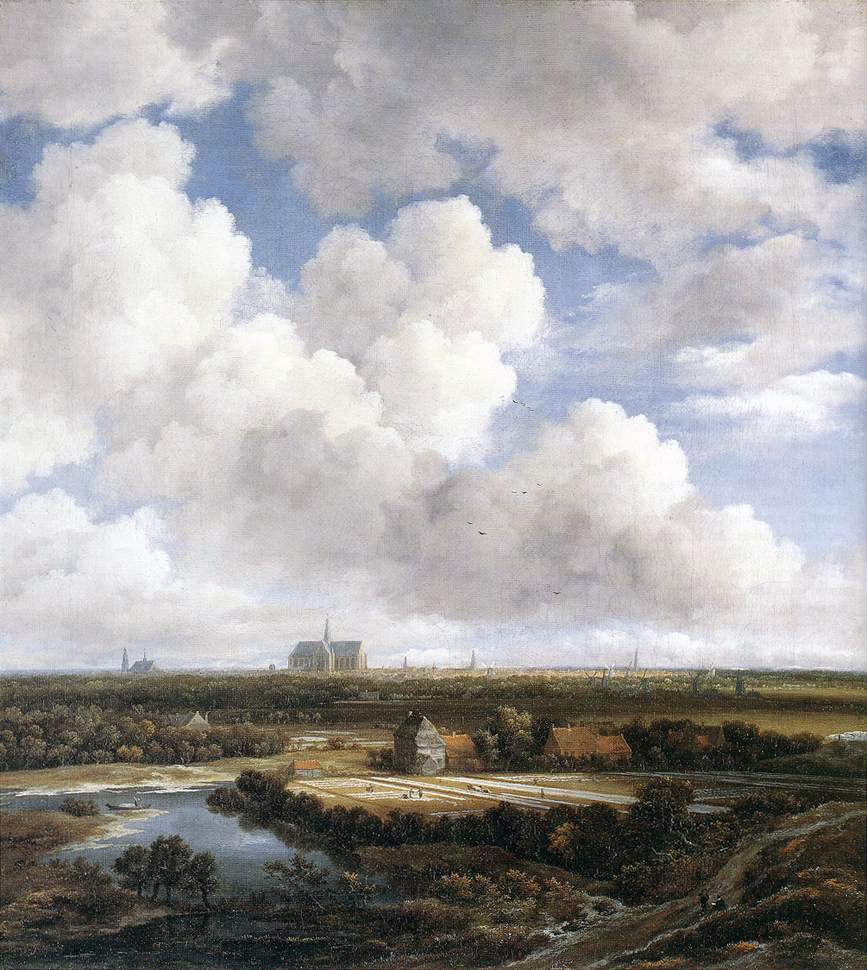
Jacob van Ruisdael, View of Haarlem; Ruisdael is a central figure, with more varied subjects than many landscapists.

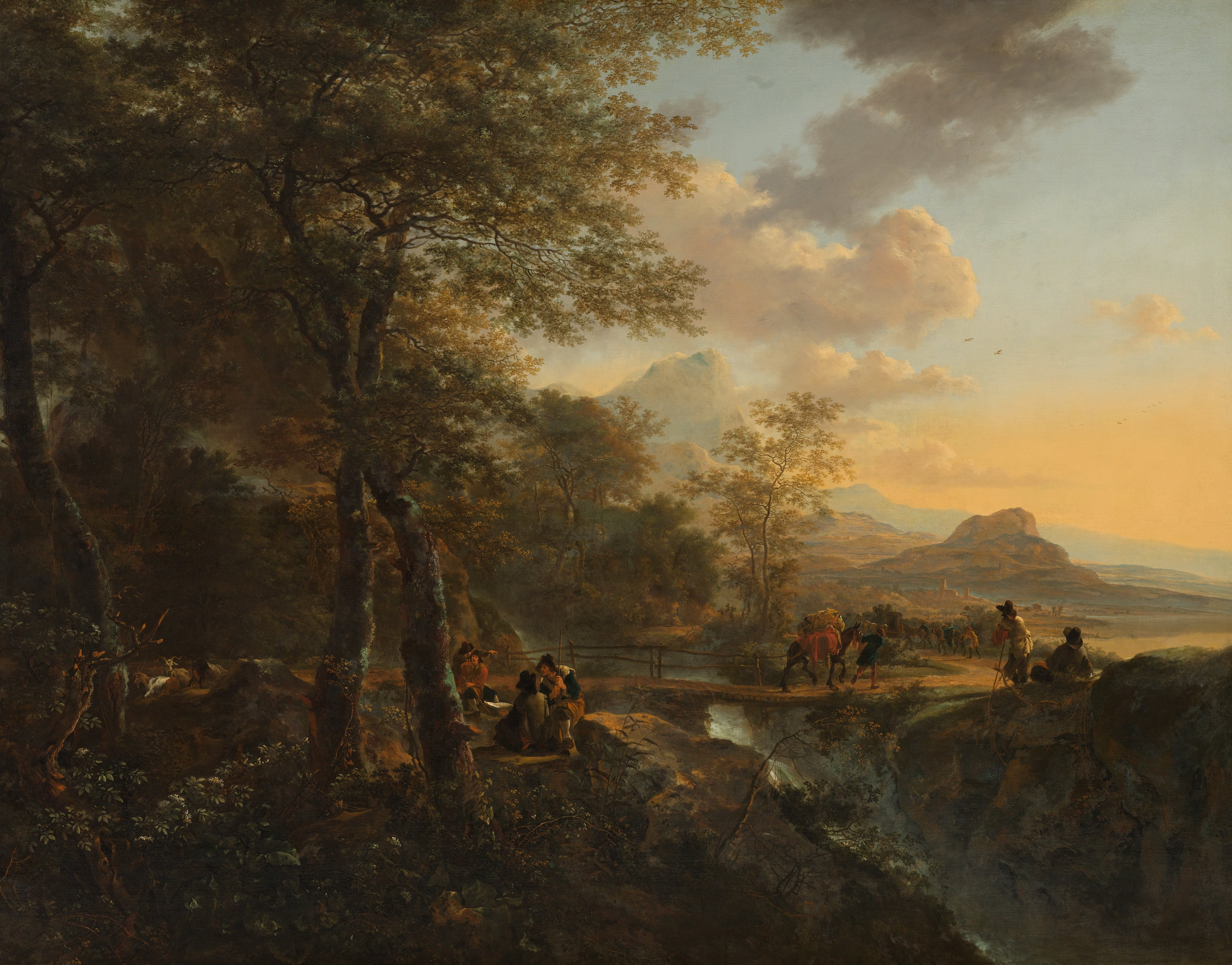
Jan Both, c. 1650, Italian landscape of the type Both began to paint after his return from Rome.

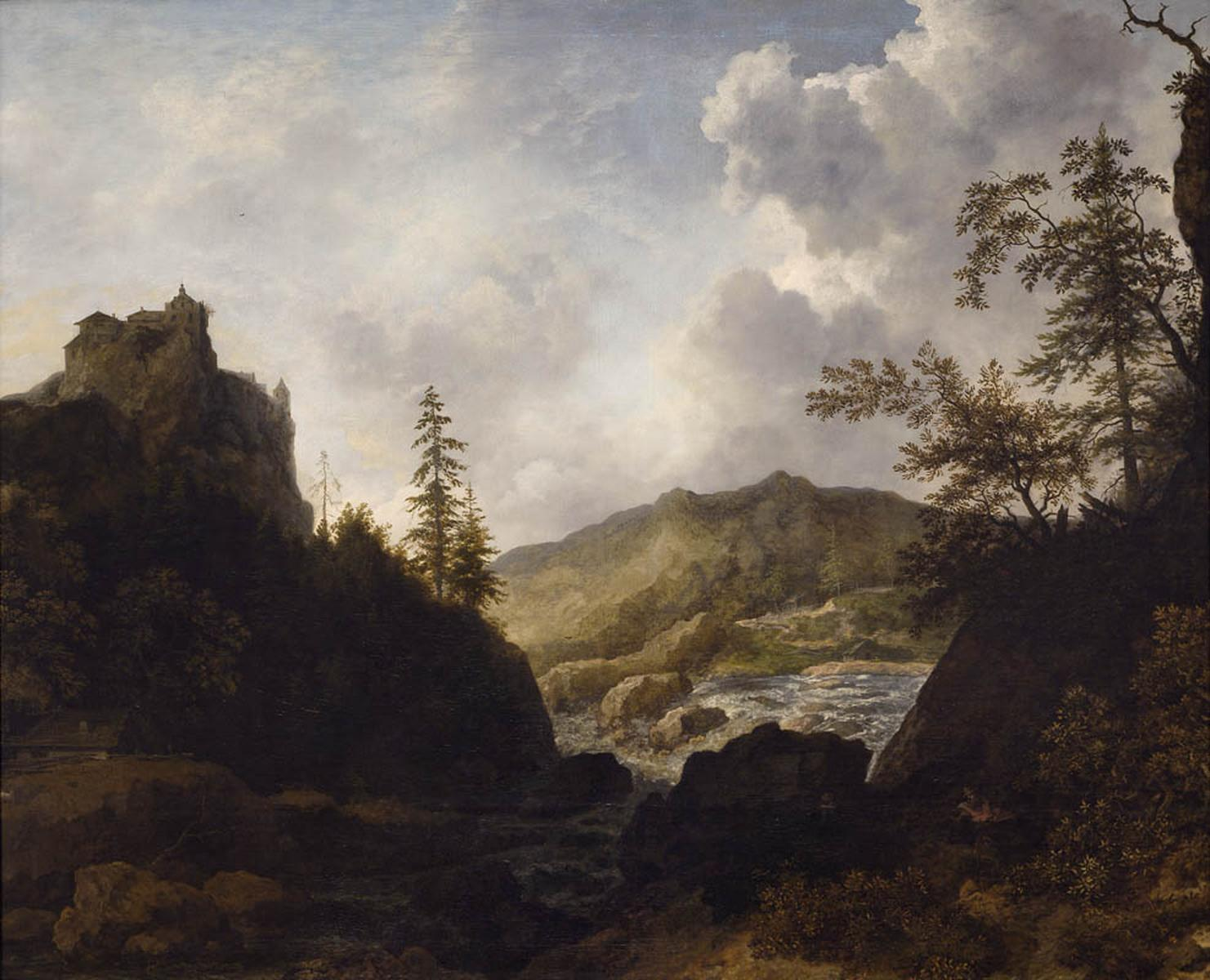
Allaert van Everdingen, c. 1660, Nordic landscape of the type Van Eeverdingen began to paint after his return from Norway and Sweden.

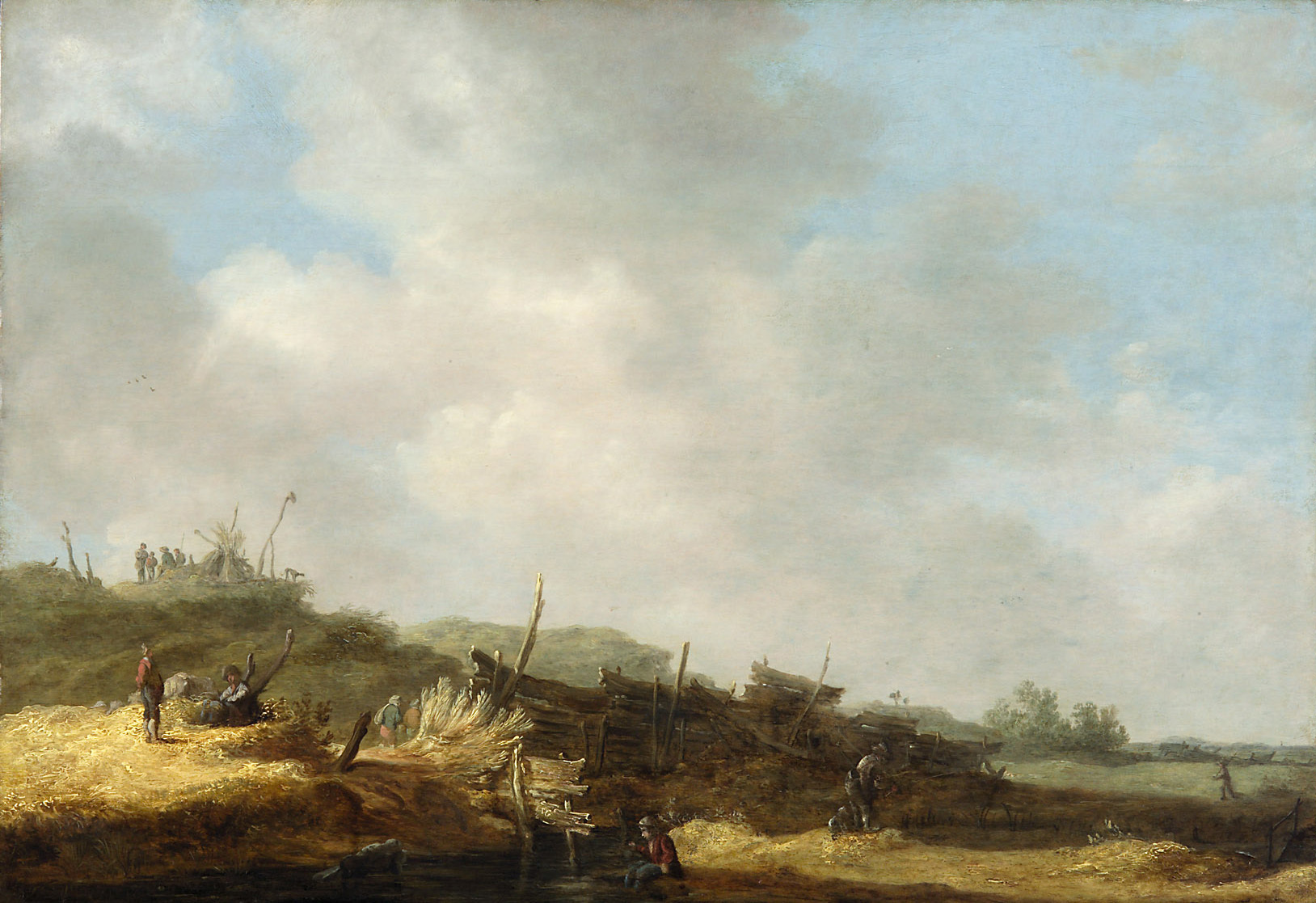
Jan van Goyen, Dune landscape; an example of the "tonal" style

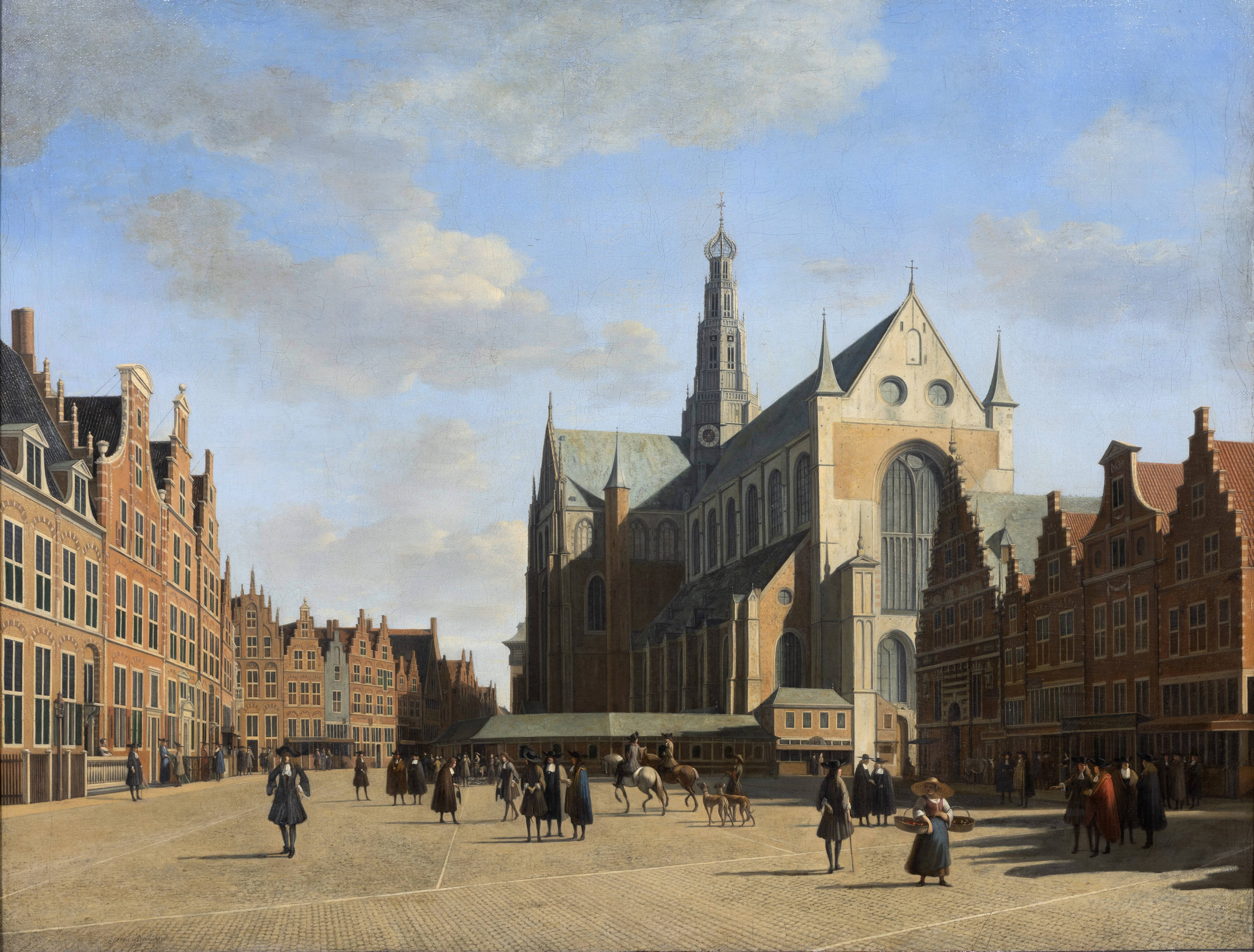
The Great Market in Haarlem, 1696, by Gerrit Berckheyde.

== Maritime painting ==
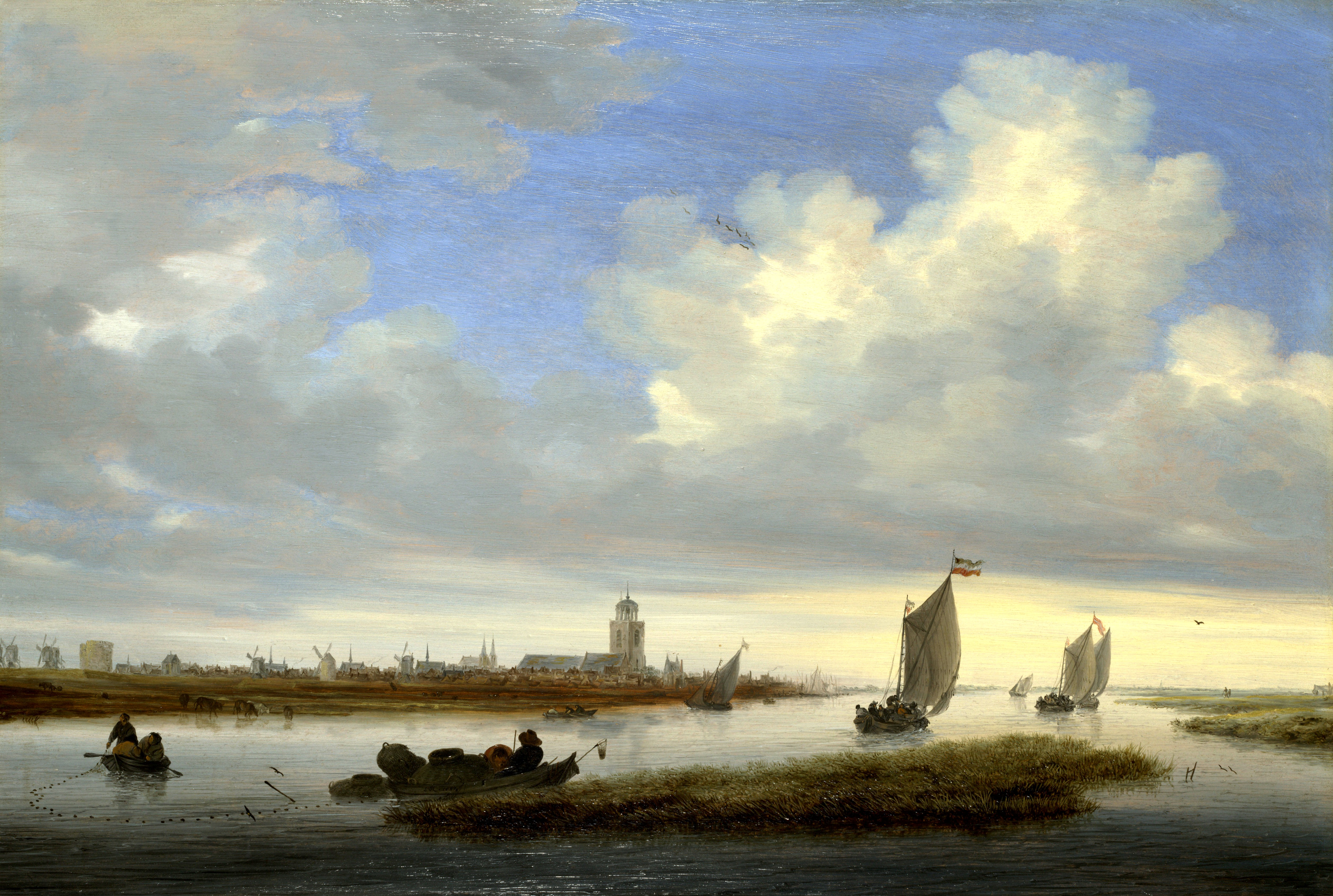
Salomon van Ruisdael, typical View of Deventer Seen from the North-West (1657); an example of the "tonal phase"

The Dutch Republic relied on trade by sea for its exceptional wealth, fought naval wars with England and other nations during the period, and was criss-crossed by rivers and canals. It is therefore no surprise that the genre of maritime painting was enormously popular, and taken to new heights in the period by Dutch artists; as with landscapes, the move from the artificial elevated view typical of earlier marine painting was a crucial step. Pictures of sea battles told the stories of a Dutch navy at the peak of its glory, though today it is usually the more tranquil scenes that are highly estimated. Ships are normally at sea, and dock scenes surprisingly absent.

More often than not, even small ships fly the Dutch tricolour, and many vessels can be identified as naval or one of the many other government ships. Many pictures included some land, with a beach or harbour viewpoint, or a view across an estuary. Other artists specialized in river scenes, from the small pictures of Salomon van Ruysdael with little boats and reed-banks to the large Italianate landscapes of Aelbert Cuyp, where the sun is usually setting over a wide river. The genre naturally shares much with landscape painting, and in developing the depiction of the sky the two went together; many landscape artists also painted beach and river scenes. Artists included Jan Porcellis, Simon de Vlieger, Jan van de Cappelle, Hendrick Dubbels and Abraham Storck. Willem van de Velde the Elder and his son are the leading masters of the later decades, tending, as at the beginning of the century, to make the ship the subject, whereas in tonal works of earlier decades the emphasis had been on the sea and the weather. They left for London in 1672, leaving the master of heavy seas, the German-born Ludolf Bakhuizen, as the leading artist.

== Still lifes ==
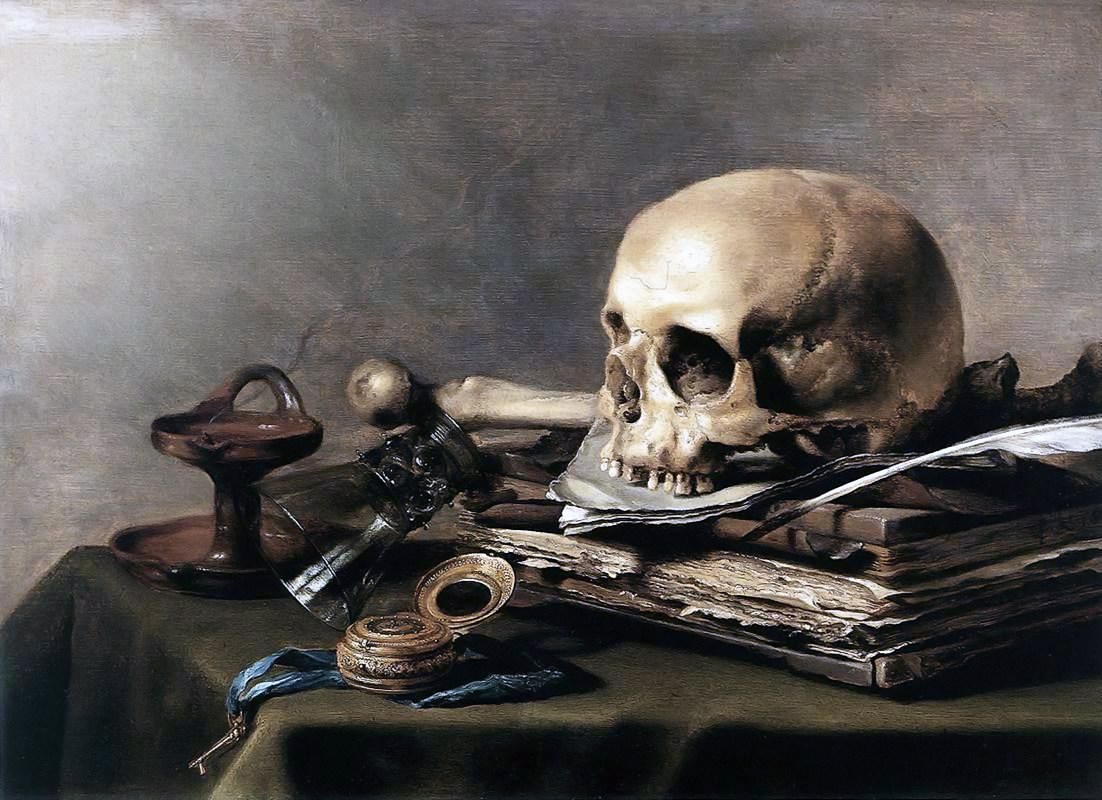
Pieter Claesz, Vanitas (1630)

Still lifes were a great opportunity to display skill in painting textures and surfaces in great detail and with realistic light effects. Food of all kinds laid out on a table, silver cutlery, intricate patterns and subtle folds in tablecloths and flowers all challenged painters. Dutch painters produced still lifes in great numbers, revealing the Dutch "love of domestic culture". The English term "derives from the Dutch word stilleven", which came into use about 1650.

Several types of subject were recognised: banketje were "banquet pieces", ontbijtjes simpler "breakfast pieces". Virtually all still lifes had a moralistic message, usually concerning the brevity of life – this is known as the vanitas theme – implicit even in the absence of an obvious symbol like a skull, or less obvious one such as a half-peeled lemon (like life, sweet in appearance but bitter to taste). Flowers wilt and food decays, and silver is of no use to the soul. Nevertheless, the force of this message seems less powerful in the more elaborate pieces of the second half of the century.

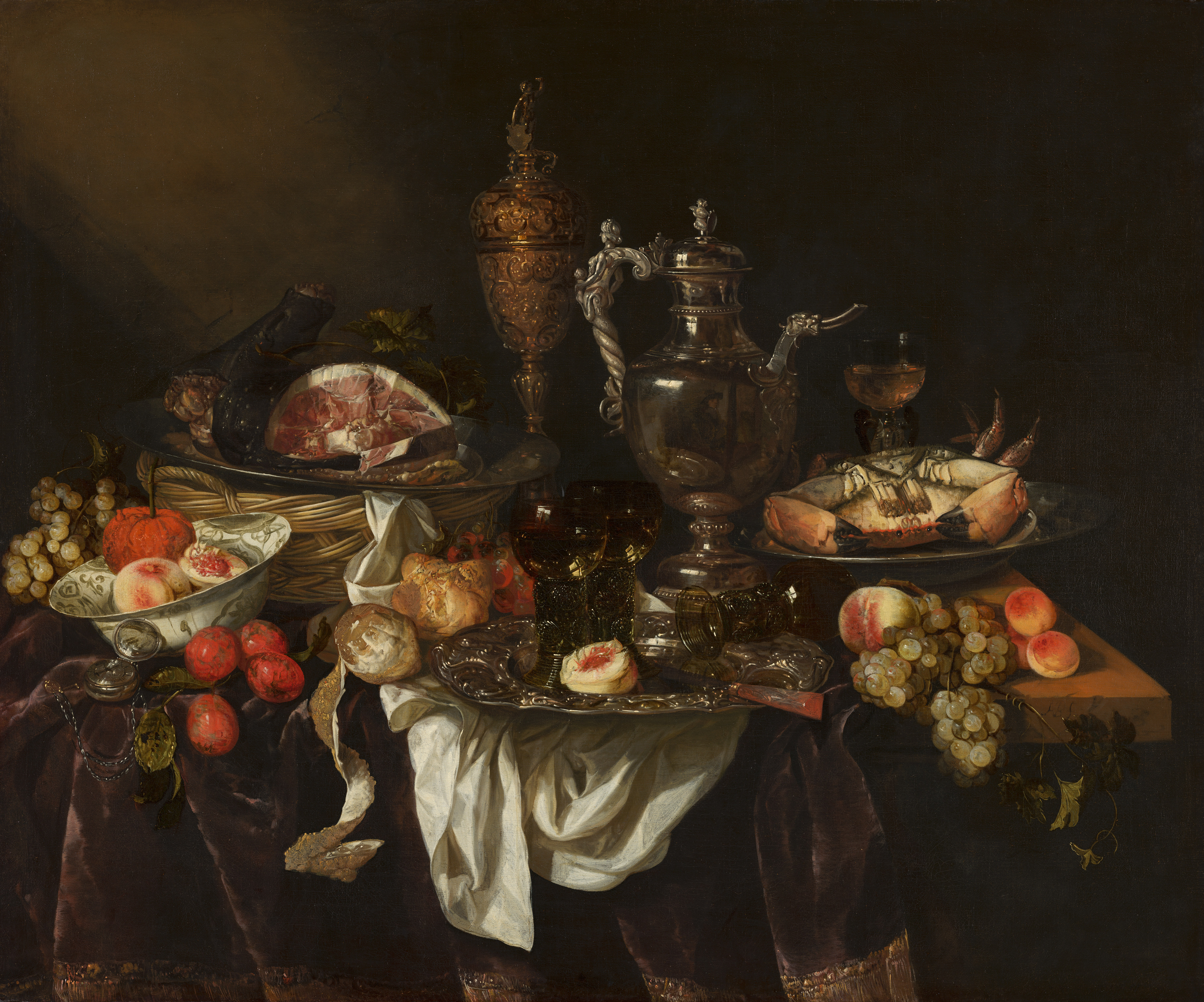
Abraham van Beijeren (c. 1660); "ostentatious" still life.

Initially the objects shown were nearly always mundane. However, from the mid-century pronkstillevens ("ostentatious still lifes"), which depicted expensive and exotic objects and had been developed as a subgenre in the 1640s in Antwerp by Flemish artists such as Frans Snyders and Adriaen van Utrecht, became more popular. The early realist, tonal and classical phases of landscape painting had counterparts in still life painting. Willem Claeszoon Heda (1595–c. 1680) and Willem Kalf (1619–1693) led the change to the pronkstilleven, while Pieter Claesz (d. 1660) preferred to paint simpler "ontbijt" ("breakfast pieces"), or explicit vanitas pieces.

In all these painters, colours are often very muted, with browns dominating, especially in the middle of the century. This is less true of the works of Jan Davidsz de Heem (1606–1684), an important figure who spent much of his career based over the border in Antwerp. Here his displays began to sprawl sideways to form wide oblong pictures, unusual in the north, although Heda sometimes painted taller vertical compositions. Still life painters were especially prone to form dynasties, it seems there were many de Heems and Bosschaerts, Heda's son continued in his father's style, and Claesz was the father of Nicholaes Berchem.

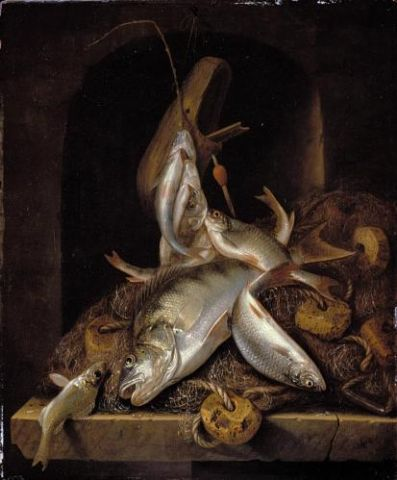
Jacob Gillig, Freshwater Fish (1684)

Flower paintings formed a sub-group with its own specialists, and were occasionally the speciality of the few women artists, such as Maria van Oosterwyck and Rachel Ruysch. The Dutch also led the world in botanical and other scientific drawings, prints and book illustrations. Despite the intense realism of individual flowers, paintings were composed from individual studies or even book illustrations, and blooms from very different seasons were routinely included in the same composition, and the same flowers reappear in different works, just as pieces of tableware do. There was also a fundamental unreality in that bouquets of flowers in vases were not in fact at all common in houses at the time – even the very rich displayed flowers one by one in delftware tulip-holders.

The Dutch tradition was largely begun by Ambrosius Bosschaert (1573–1621), a Flemish-born flower painter who had settled in the north by the beginning of the period and founded a dynasty. His brother-in-law Balthasar van der Ast (d. 1657) pioneered still lifes of shells, as well as painting flowers. These early works were relatively brightly lit, with the bouquets of flowers arranged in a relatively simple way. From the mid-century arrangements that can fairly be called Baroque, usually against a dark background, became more popular, exemplified by the works of Willem van Aelst (1627–1683). Painters from Leiden, The Hague, and Amsterdam particularly excelled in the genre.

Dead game, and birds painted live but studied from the dead, were another subgenre, as were dead fish, a staple of the Dutch diet – Abraham van Beijeren did many of these. The Dutch were less given to the Flemish style of combining large still life elements with other types of painting – they would have been considered prideful in portraits – and the Flemish habit of specialist painters collaborating on the different elements in the same work. But this sometimes did happen – Philips Wouwerman was occasionally used to add men and horses to turn a landscape into a hunting or skirmish scene, Berchem or Adriaen van de Velde to add people or farm animals.

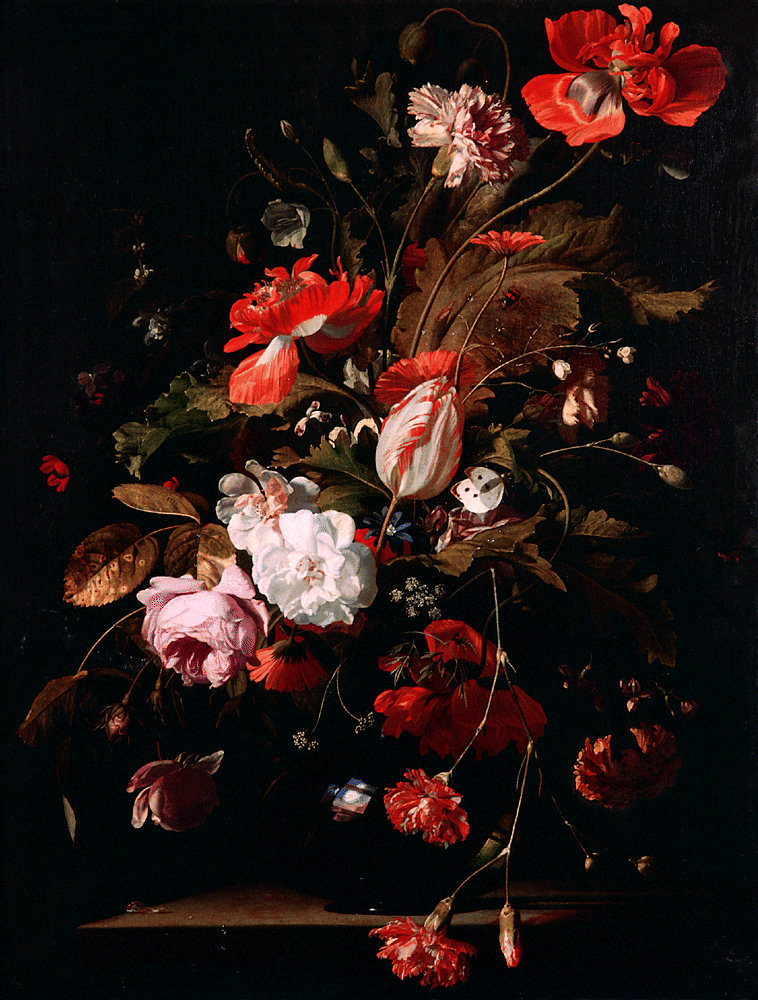
Willem van Aelst, Still life with a watch (c. 1665), with typical dark background.

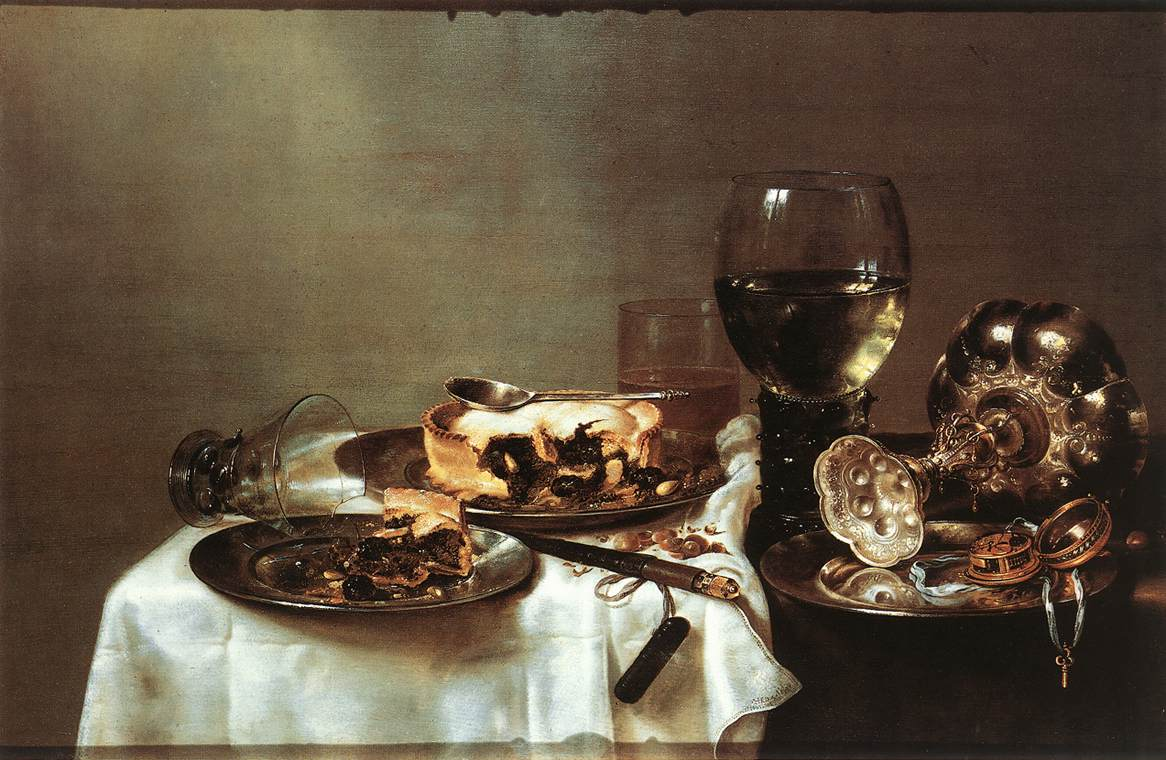
Willem Claeszoon Heda, Breakfast Table with Blackberry Pie (1631); Heda was famous for his depiction of reflective surfaces.

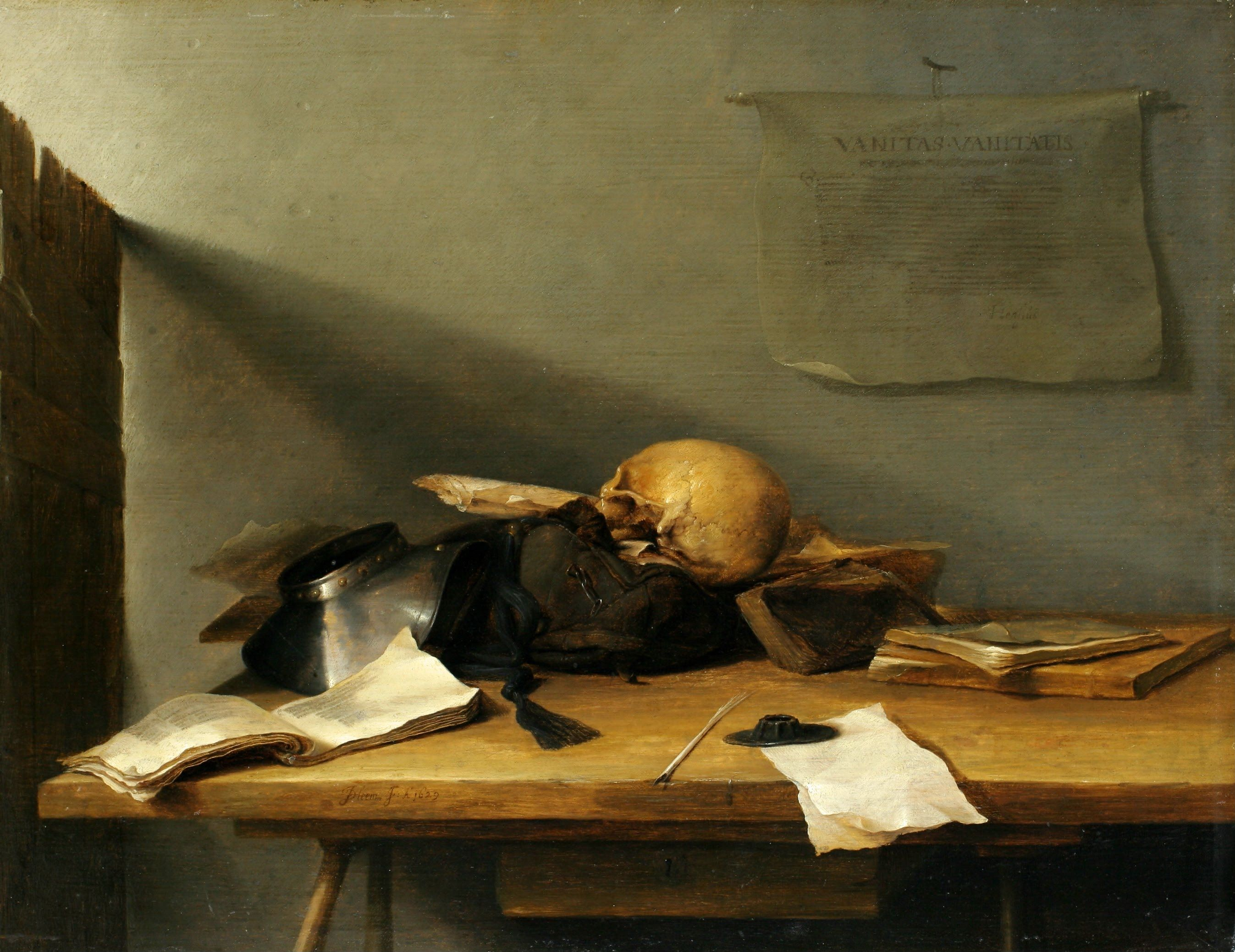
Jan Davidszoon de Heem, Vanitas (1629)

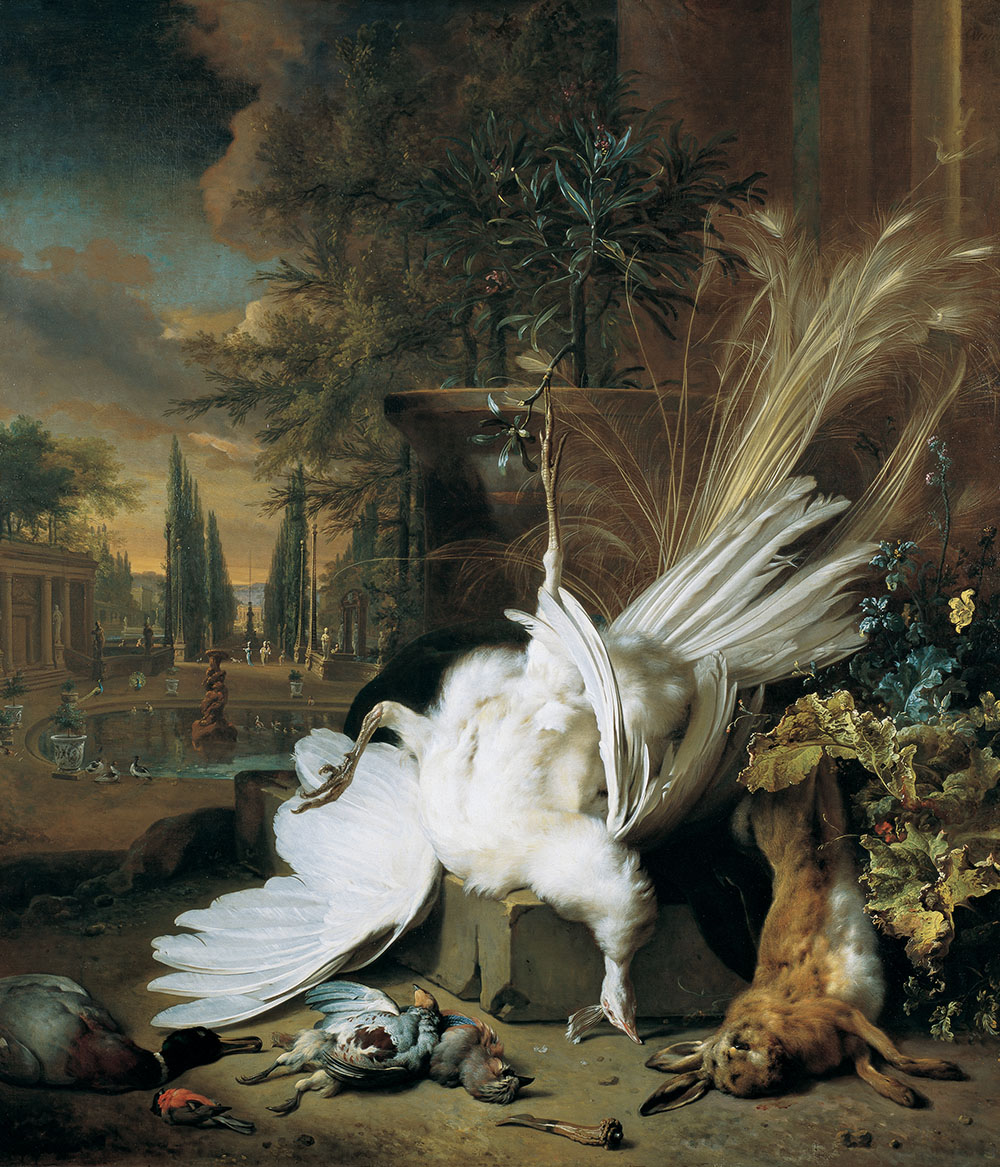
Jan Weenix, Still Life with a Dead Peacock (1692), set in the gardens of a large country house.

== Foreign lands ==
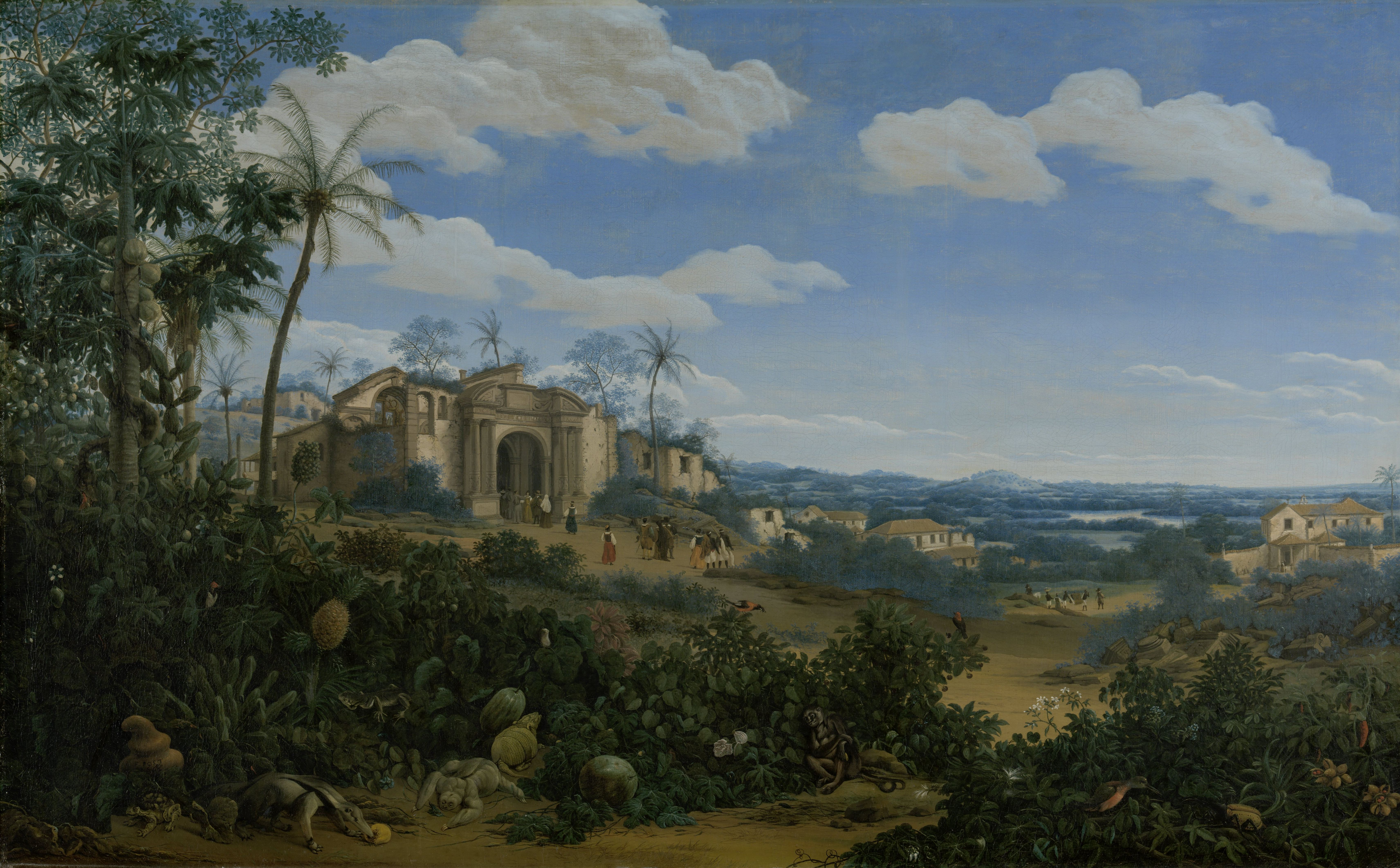
Frans Post, scene in Dutch Brazil; painted in 1662, some years after the colony was lost.

For Dutch artists, Karel van Mander's Schilderboeck was meant not only as a list of biographies, but also a source of advice for young artists. It quickly became a classic standard work for generations of young Dutch and Flemish artists in the 17th century. The book advised artists to travel and see the sights of Florence and Rome, and after 1604 many did so. However, it is noticeable that the most important Dutch artists in all fields, figures such as Rembrandt, Vermeer, Hals, Steen, Jacob van Ruisdael, and others, had not made the voyage.

Many Dutch (and Flemish) painters worked abroad or exported their work; printmaking was also an important export market, by which Rembrandt became known across Europe. The Dutch Gift to Charles II of England was a diplomatic gift which included four contemporary Dutch paintings. English painting was heavily reliant on Dutch painters, with Sir Peter Lely followed by Sir Godfrey Kneller, developing the English portrait style established by the Flemish Anthony van Dyck before the English Civil War. The marine painters van der Velde, father and son, were among several artists who left Holland at the French invasion of 1672, which brought a collapse in the art market. They also moved to London, and the beginnings of English landscape painting were established by several less distinguished Dutch painters, such as Hendrick Danckerts.

The Bamboccianti were a colony of Dutch artists who introduced the genre scene to Italy. Jan Weenix and Melchior d'Hondecoeter specialized in game and birds, dead or alive, and were in demand for country house and shooting-lodge overdoors across Northern Europe.

Although the Dutch control of the northeast sugar-producing region of Dutch Brazil turned out to be brief (1630–54), Governor Johan Maurits van Nassau-Siegen invited Dutch artists to paint scenes which are valuable in showing the seventeenth-century landscape and peoples of the region. The two most well-known of these artists were Frans Post, a landscapist, and a still life painter, Albert Eckhout, who produced ethnographic paintings of Brazil's population. These were originally displayed in the Great Hall of the Vrijburg Palace in Recife. There was a market in Amsterdam for such paintings, and Post continued to produce Brazilian scenes for years after his return to the Netherlands. The Dutch East Indies were covered much less well artistically.

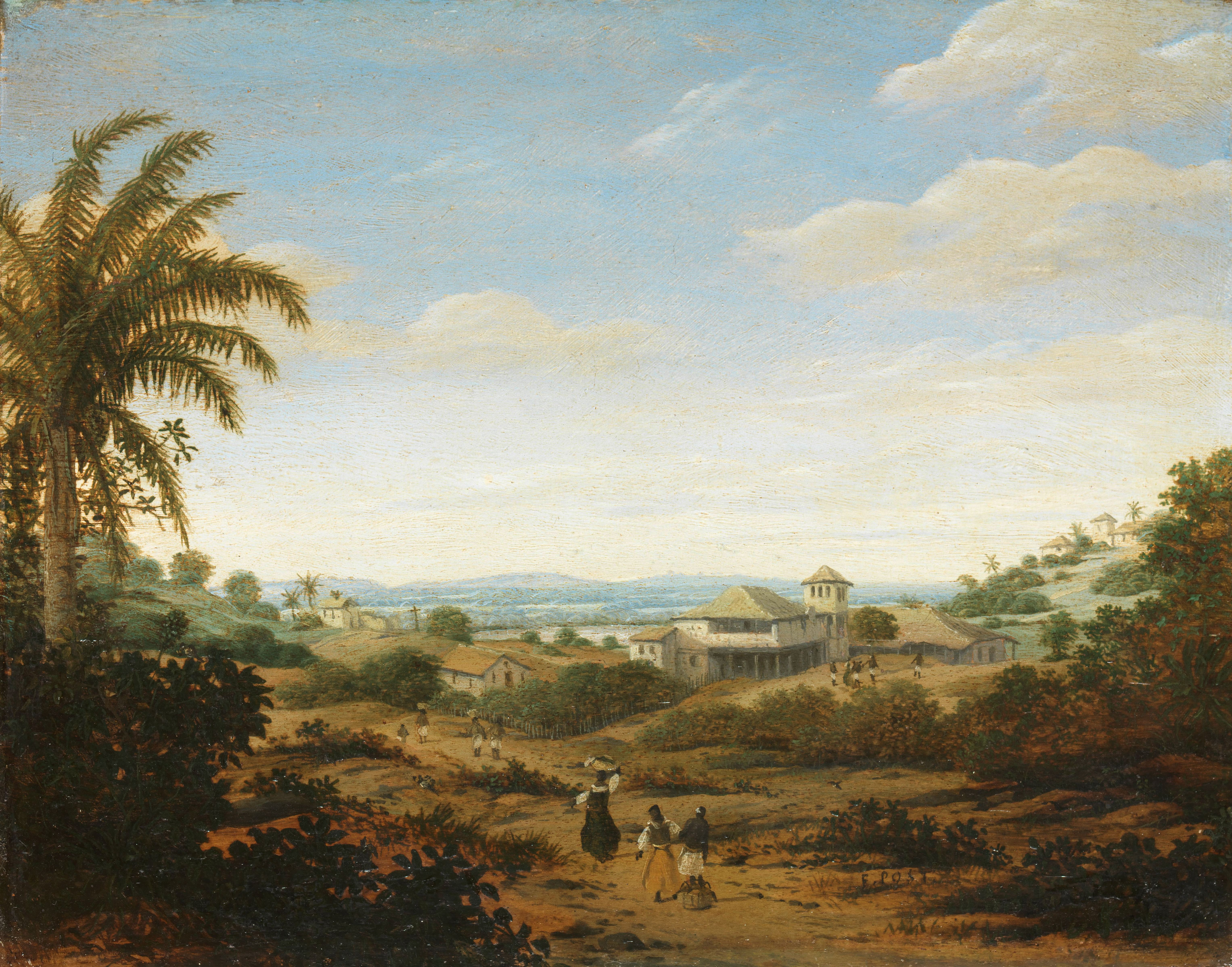
Landscape with sugar mill (engenho), Frans Post

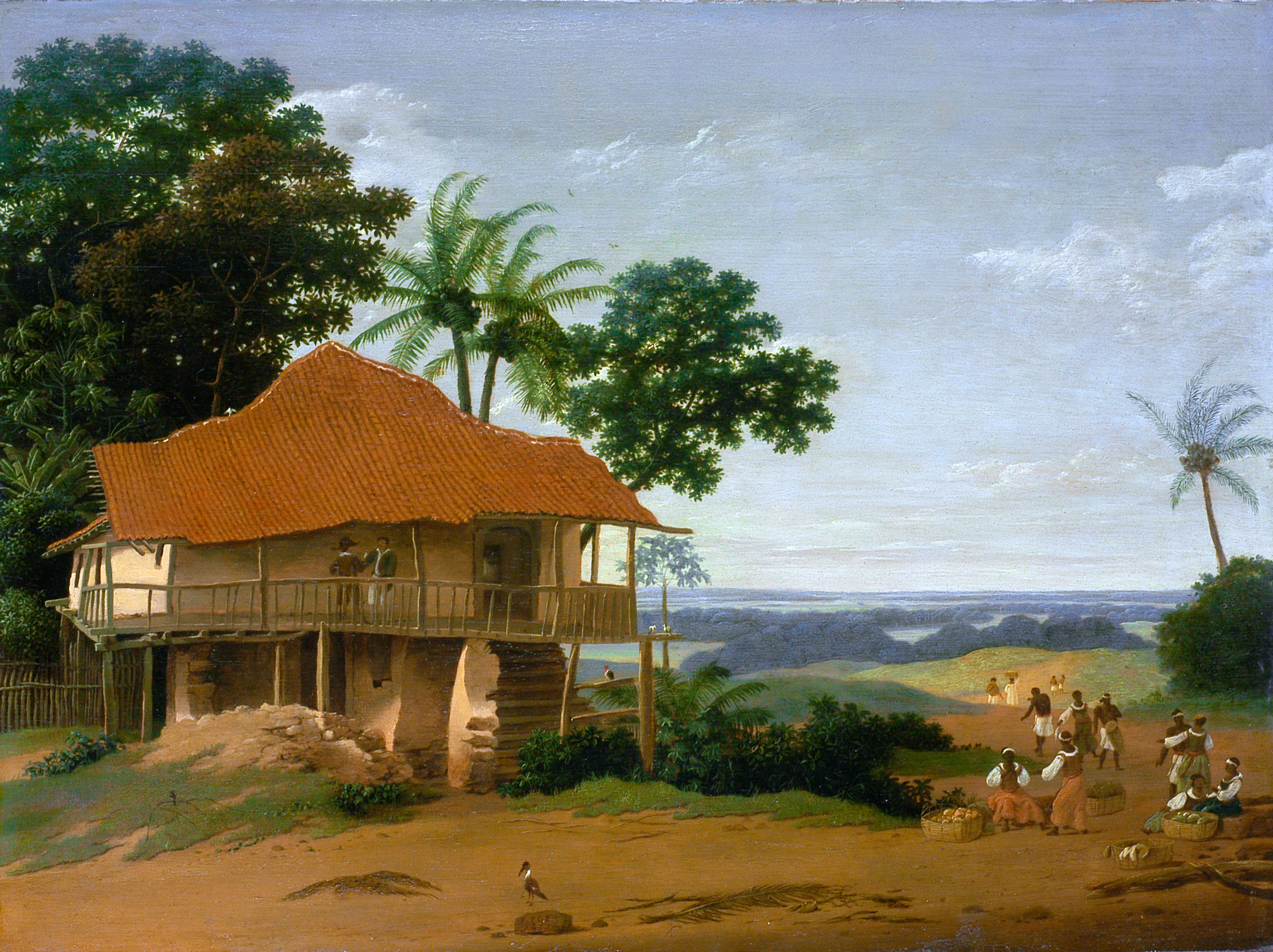
Landscape with a worker's house, Frans Post

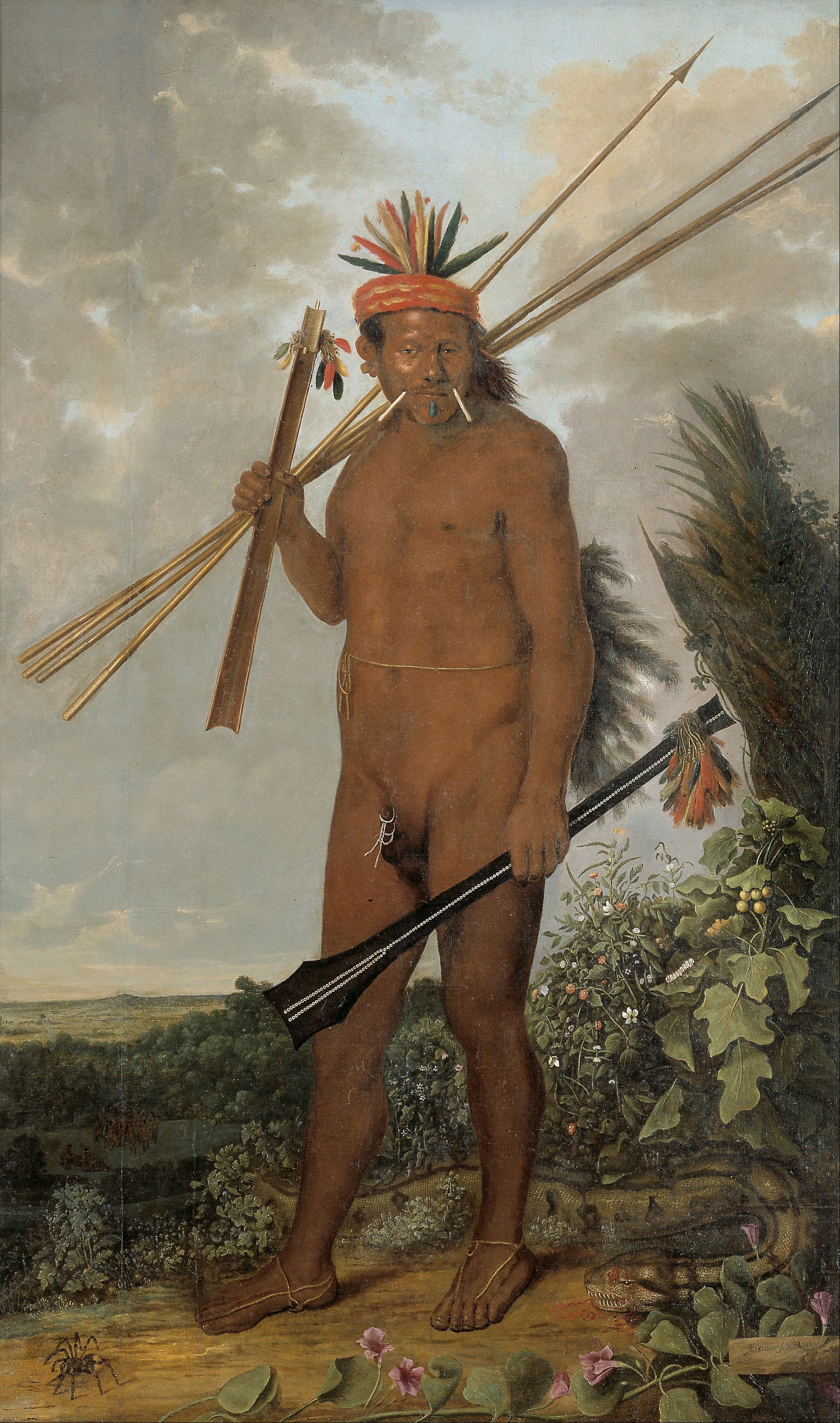
Brazilian Indian warrior (Tarairiu), Albert Eckhout

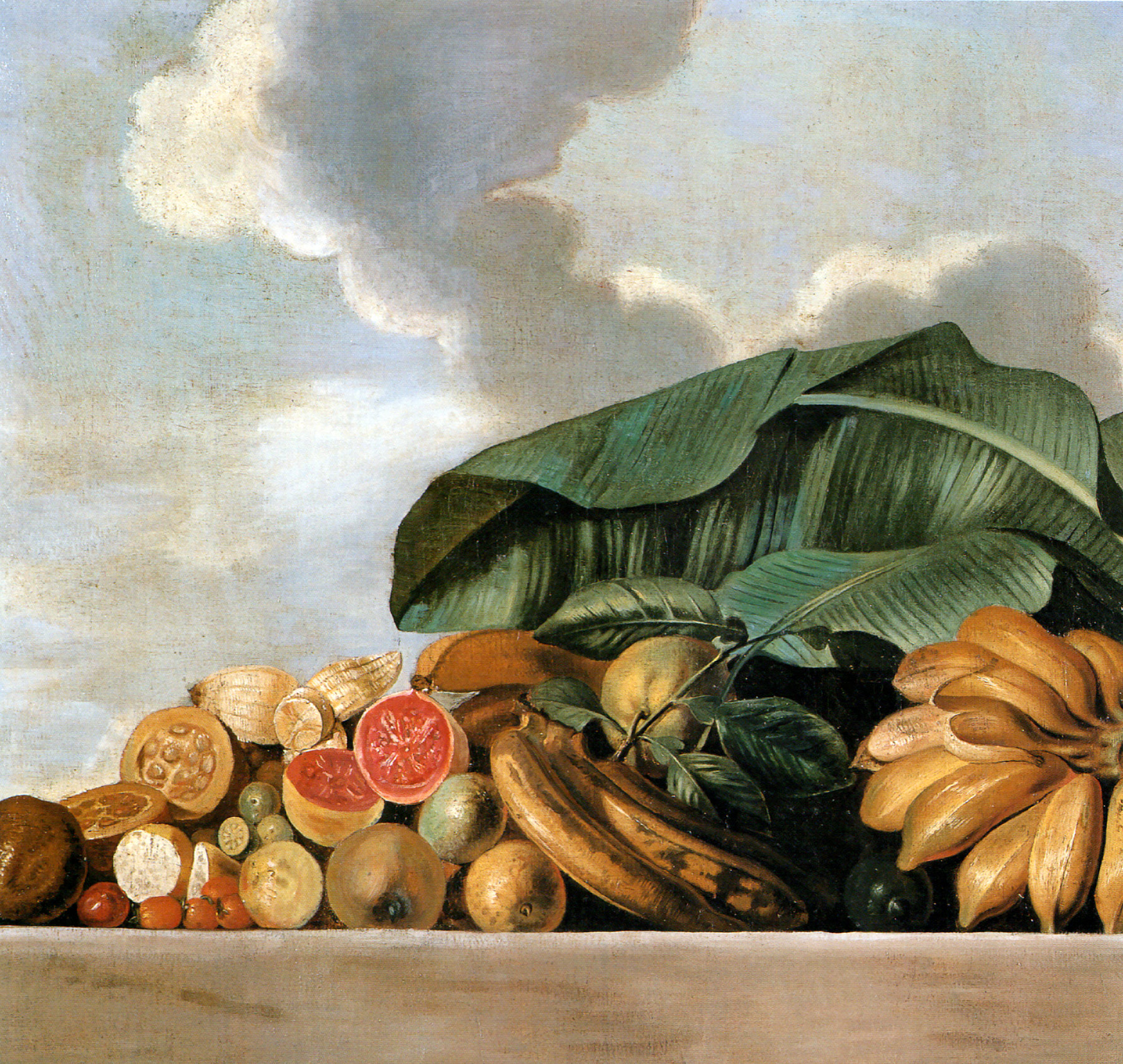
Bananas, goiaba, and other fruits, Albert Eckhout

== Subsequent reputation ==
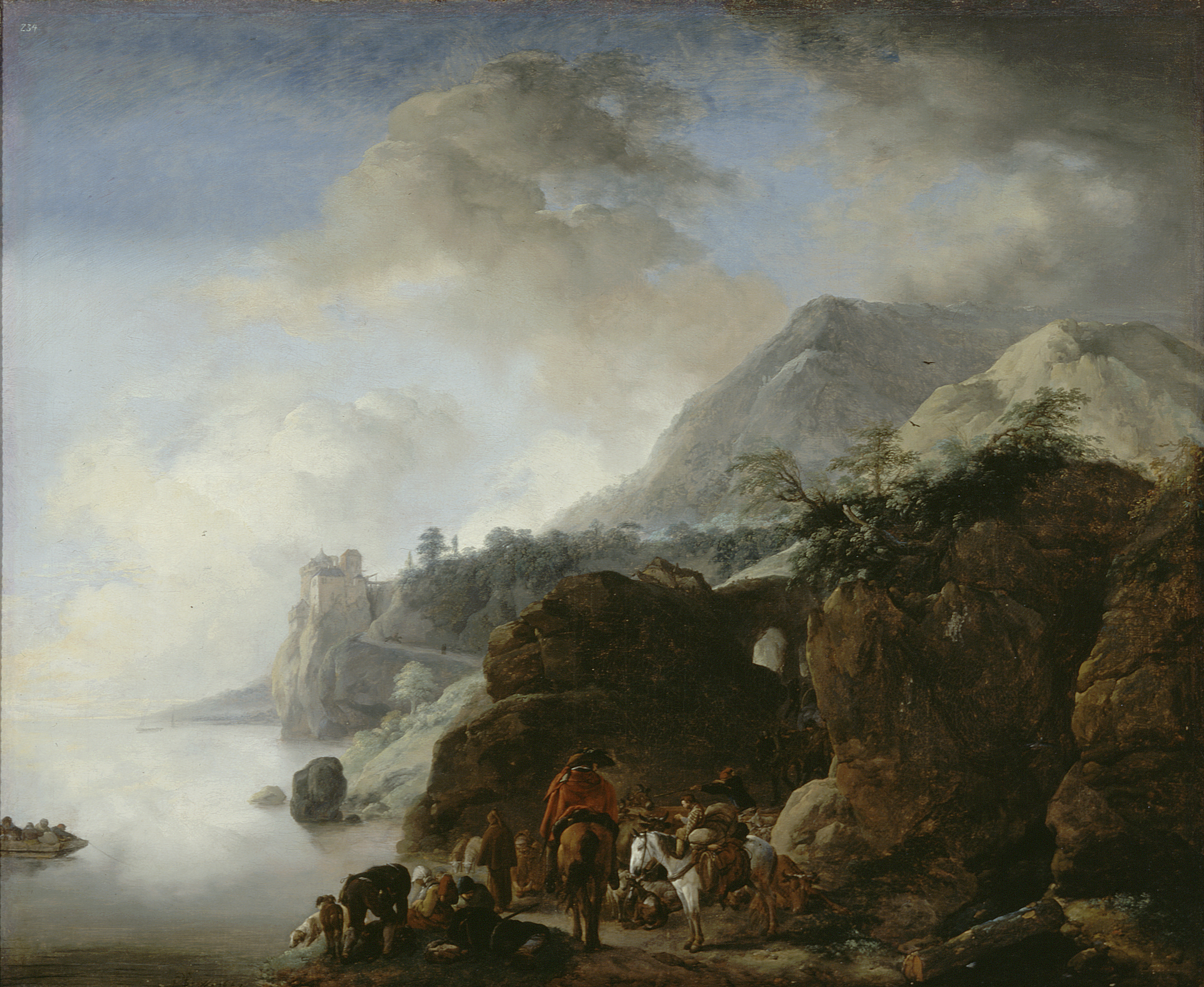
Philips Wouwerman, Travelers Awaiting a Ferry (1649); a landscape with Wouwerman's trademark highlight of a white horse

The enormous success of 17th-century Dutch painting overpowered the work of subsequent generations, and no Dutch painter of the 18th century – nor, arguably, a 19th-century one before Van Gogh – is well known outside the Netherlands. Already by the end of the period artists were complaining that buyers were more interested in dead than living artists.

If only because of the enormous quantities produced, Dutch Golden Age painting has always formed a significant part of collections of Old Master paintings, itself a term invented in the 18th century to describe Dutch Golden Age artists. Taking only Wouwerman paintings in old royal collections, there are more than 60 in Dresden and over 50 in the Hermitage. But the reputation of the period has shown many changes and shifts of emphasis. One nearly constant factor has been admiration for Rembrandt, especially since the Romantic period. Other artists have shown drastic shifts in critical fortune and market price; at the end of the period some of the active Leiden fijnschilders had enormous reputations, but since the mid-19th century realist works in various genres have been far more appreciated.

Vermeer was rescued from near-total obscurity in the 19th century, by which time several of his works had been re-attributed to others. However the fact that so many of his works were already in major collections, often attributed to other artists, demonstrates that the quality of individual paintings was recognised even if his collective oeuvre was unknown. Other artists have continued to be rescued from the mass of little-known painters: the late and very simple still lifes of Adriaen Coorte in the 1950s, and the landscapists Jacobus Mancaden and Frans Post earlier in the century.

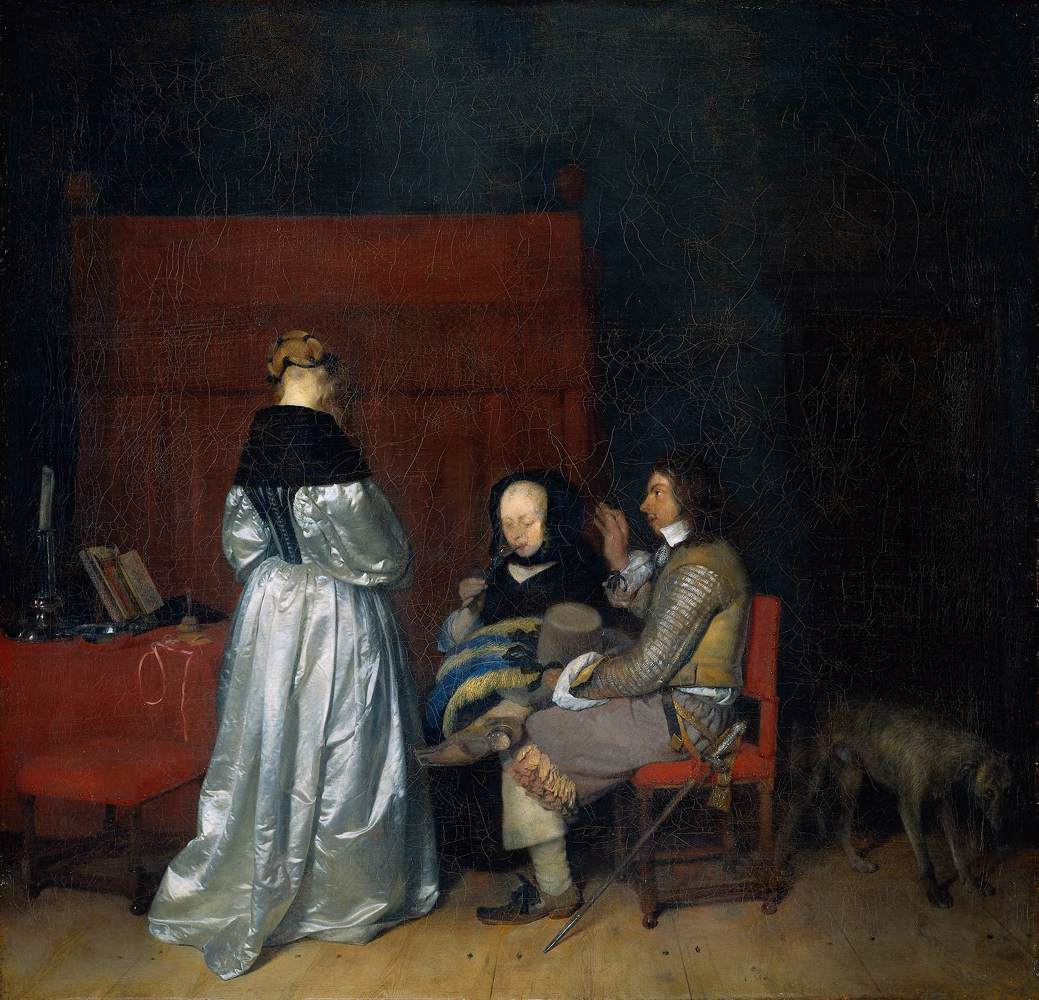
Gerard ter Borch, Paternal Admonition, or Brothel Scene (c. 1654; Amsterdam version)

Genre paintings were long popular, but little-regarded. In 1780, Horace Walpole disapproved that they "invite laughter to divert itself with the nastiest indelicacy of boors". Sir Joshua Reynolds, the English leader of 18th-century academic art, made several revealing comments on Dutch art. He was impressed by the quality of Vermeer's Milkmaid (illustrated at the start of this article), and the liveliness of Hals' portraits, regretting he lacked the "patience" to finish them properly, and lamented that Steen had not been born in Italy and formed by the High Renaissance, so that his talent could have been put to better use. By Reynolds' time, the moralist aspect of genre painting was no longer understood, even in the Netherlands; the famous example is the so-called Paternal Admonition, as it was then known, by Gerard ter Borch. This was praised by Goethe and others for the delicacy of its depiction of a father reprimanding his daughter. In fact, in the view of most (but not all) modern scholars it is a proposition scene in a brothel – there are two versions (Berlin & Amsterdam) and it is unclear whether a "tell-tale coin" in the man's hand has been removed or overpainted in either.

In the second half of the 18th century, the down-to-earth realism of Dutch painting was a "Whig taste" in England, and in France associated with Enlightenment rationalism and aspirations for political reform. In the 19th century, with a near-universal respect for realism, and the final decline of the hierarchy of genres, contemporary painters began to borrow from genre painters both their realism and their use of objects for narrative purposes, and paint similar subjects themselves, with all the genres the Dutch had pioneered appearing on far larger canvases (still lifes excepted).

In landscape painting, the Italianate artists were the most influential and highly regarded in the 18th century, but John Constable was among those Romantics who denounced them for artificiality, preferring the tonal and classical artists. In fact, both groups remained influential and popular in the 19th century.

== See also ==
- Art of the Low Countries
- Delft School (painting)
- Dutch School (painting)
- List of Dutch painters
- List of painters from the Dutch Golden Age
