= Hendrick Dubbels =

Dutch painter

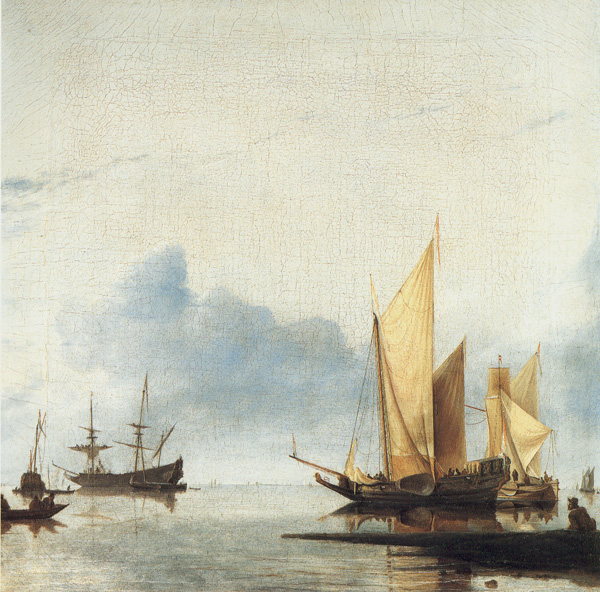
Marine scene, 1660s; a tranquil scene influenced by Jan van de Cappelle and the Van de Veldes.

Hendrick Jacobszoon Dubbels (1621–1707) was a Dutch Golden Age painter of marine subjects and winter landscapes, who spent much of his career working in the studios of other marine artists.

Dubbels was born and lived his entire life in Amsterdam. He was the son of a diamond-cutter, and baptised in the Oude Kerk on May 2, 1621. He married in 1651 and again in 1656, when he described himself as a "painter", but he is described as a "shopkeeper" in 1663 and 1665, when he was made bankrupt. He had been a "winkelier" or haberdasher-draper, "selling caps, bonnets and stockings". This was presumably an unsuccessful attempt to escape from the highly competitive Amsterdam art world. His earliest dated work is a drawing from 1641, with a dated painting from 1643. His marine style was initially based on that of Jan Porcellis, then that of Simon de Vlieger in whose studio he worked c. 1650–3, bringing him into contact with Jan van de Cappelle.

The 1650s were the period of his best work, including his winter landscapes, which were strongly influenced by those of Jan van de Cappelle, as were his tranquil marine scenes. He then worked for Willem van de Velde the Elder and his son Willem II until they left for London after the rampjaar ("Year of Disasters") of 1672. In the late 1650s or early 1660s he trained Ludolf Bakhuizen, the leading Dutch marine painter of the last decades of the century, for whom he later worked. Abraham Storck was another influence on his later work, which declined sharply in quality from the 1680s. In his last years he painted inferior replicas of his own earlier works and those of others. He was buried in the Nieuwe Zuids chapel on October 20, 1707 – a recent archival discovery, before which he was often said, following Bredius, to have died, or at least vanished from view, in the late 1670s.

There are works in the National Gallery (right) and National Maritime Museum in London, the Louvre and many other collections.
