= Jan van de Cappelle =

Dutch painter

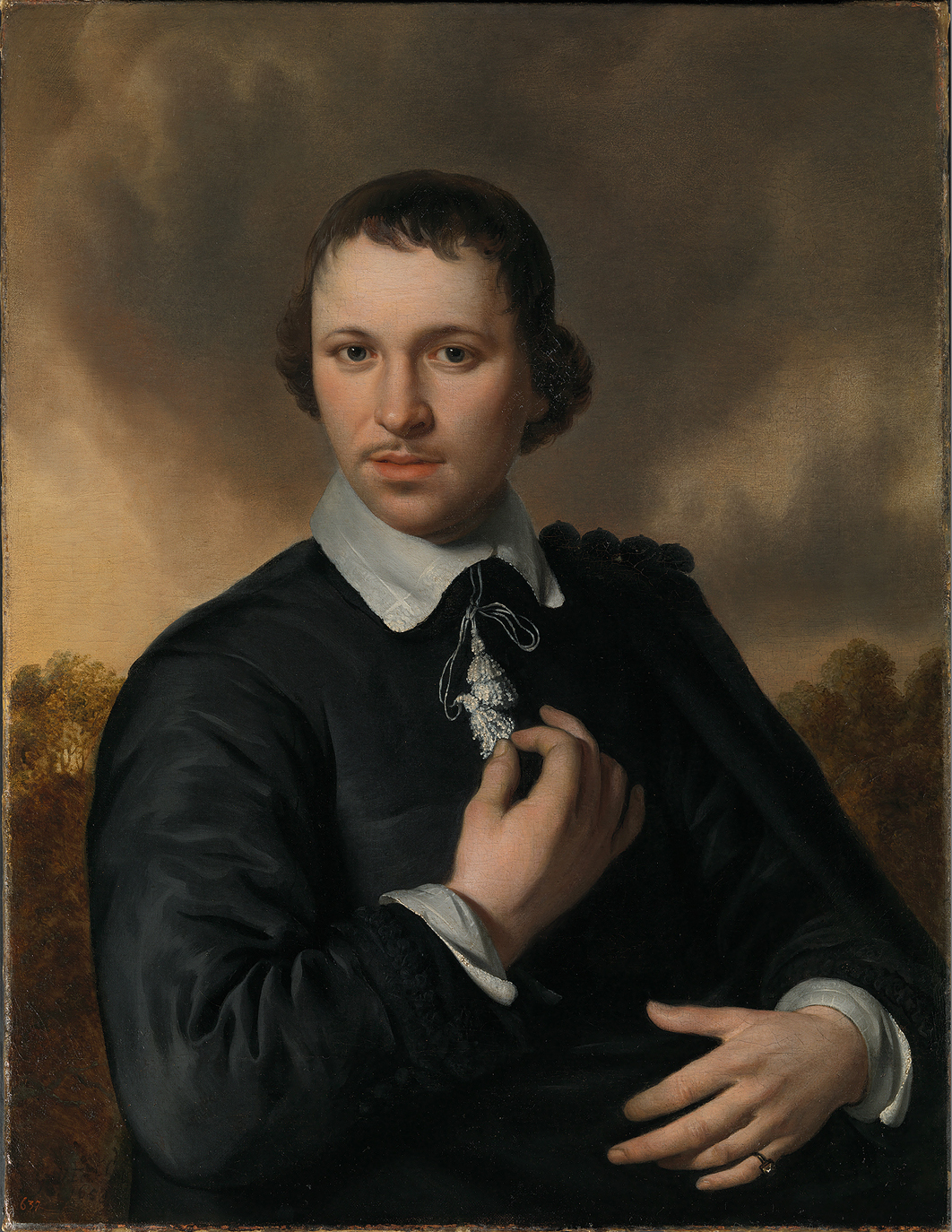
Jan van de Cappelle, by Gerbrand van den Eeckhout

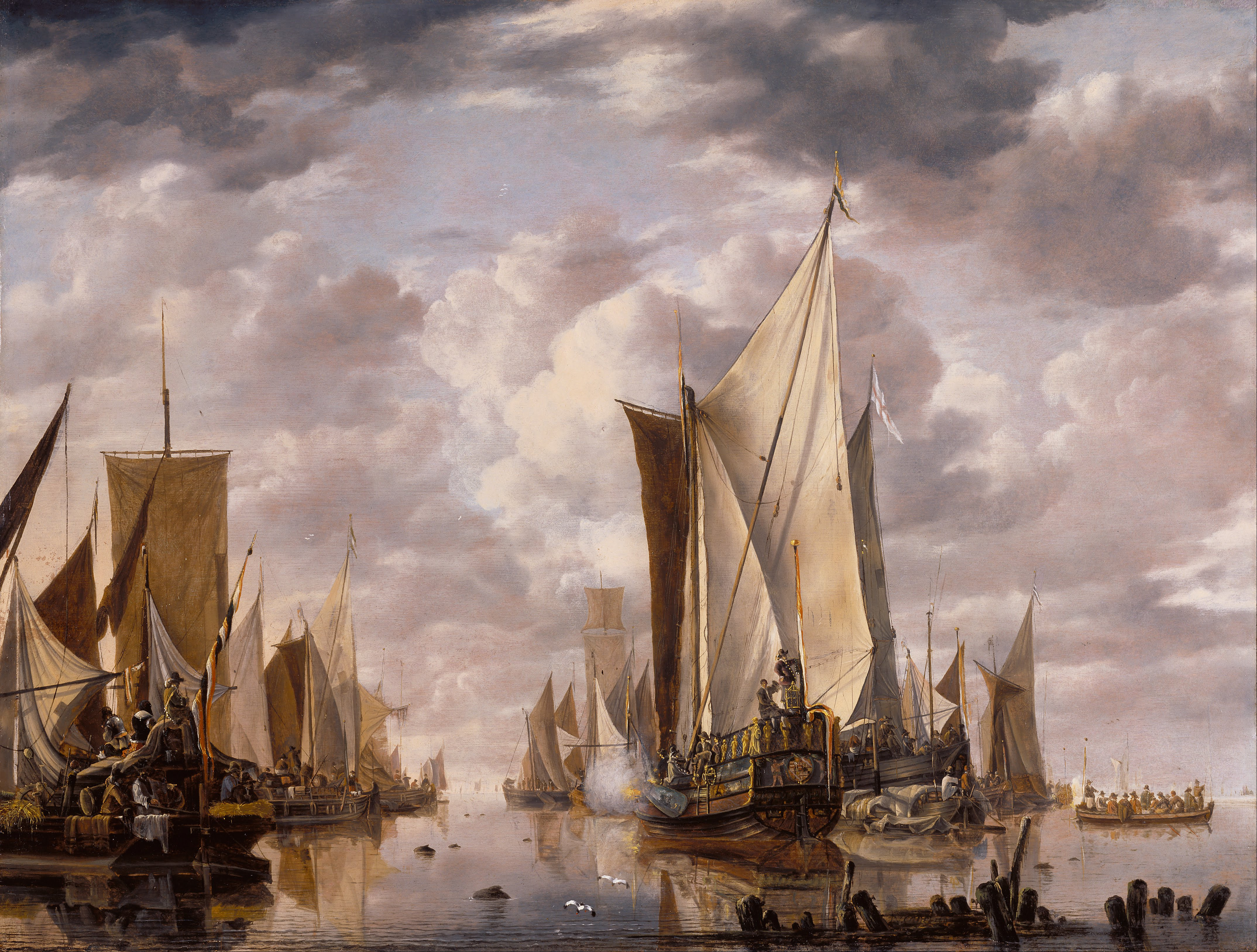
Shipping in a Calm at Flushing with a States General Yacht Firing a Salute, 1649

Jan van de Cappelle (or Joannes / van der / Capelle in various combinations; 25 January 1626 (baptized) – 22 December 1679 (buried)) was a Dutch Golden Age painter of seascapes and winter landscapes, also notable as an industrialist and art collector. He is "now considered the outstanding marine painter of 17th century Holland".

He lived all his life in Amsterdam, and as well as working as an artist spent much, or most, of his time helping to manage his father Franchoy's large dyeworks, which specialized in the expensive dye carmine, and which he eventually inherited in 1674. Presumably because of this dual career, there are fewer than 150 surviving paintings, a relatively small number for the industrious painters of the Dutch Golden Age. His marine paintings usually show estuary or river scenes rather than the open sea, and the water is always very calm, allowing it to act as a mirror reflecting the cloud formations above; this effect was Cappelle's speciality.

== Life ==
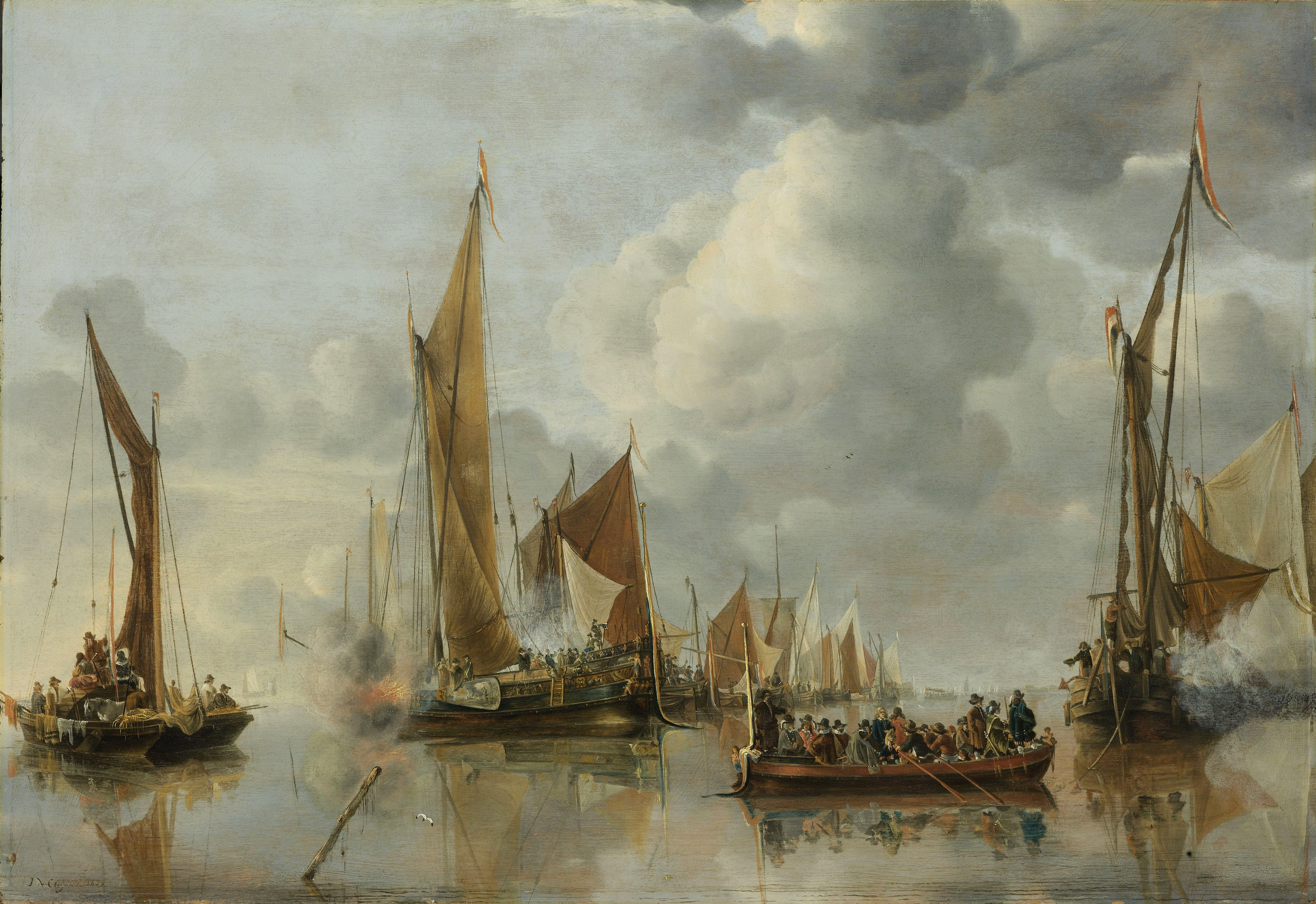
The Home Fleet Saluting the State Barge, 1650, a "parade" picture. 64 × 92.5 cm (25.20 × 36.42 in)

His father (1594–1674) was a cloth-dyer, his mother came from Rotterdam; they married in 1622 in Amsterdam. Joannes' baptism is recorded in the Nieuwe Kerk, Amsterdam on 25 January 1626. He was described (by Gerbrand van den Eeckhout) as a self-taught artist, but probably received some form of training from Simon de Vlieger, whose style he copied or is closest to his early paintings, and perhaps other masters such as Willem van de Velde the Elder. He received the citizenship of Amsterdam on 24 July 1653, an essentially honorific ceremony for one of the city elite. A few months before, on 2 February 1653, he had married Annetje Jansdr. Grotingh, the daughter of a bricklayer. Van de Cappelle was a very wealthy man who never needed to rely on his painting for his livelihood, and it is not known if he joined the city's Guild of Saint Luke, or the separate "brotherhood of painters" founded in 1653. Whether he sold his work, or how he did so, is unclear.

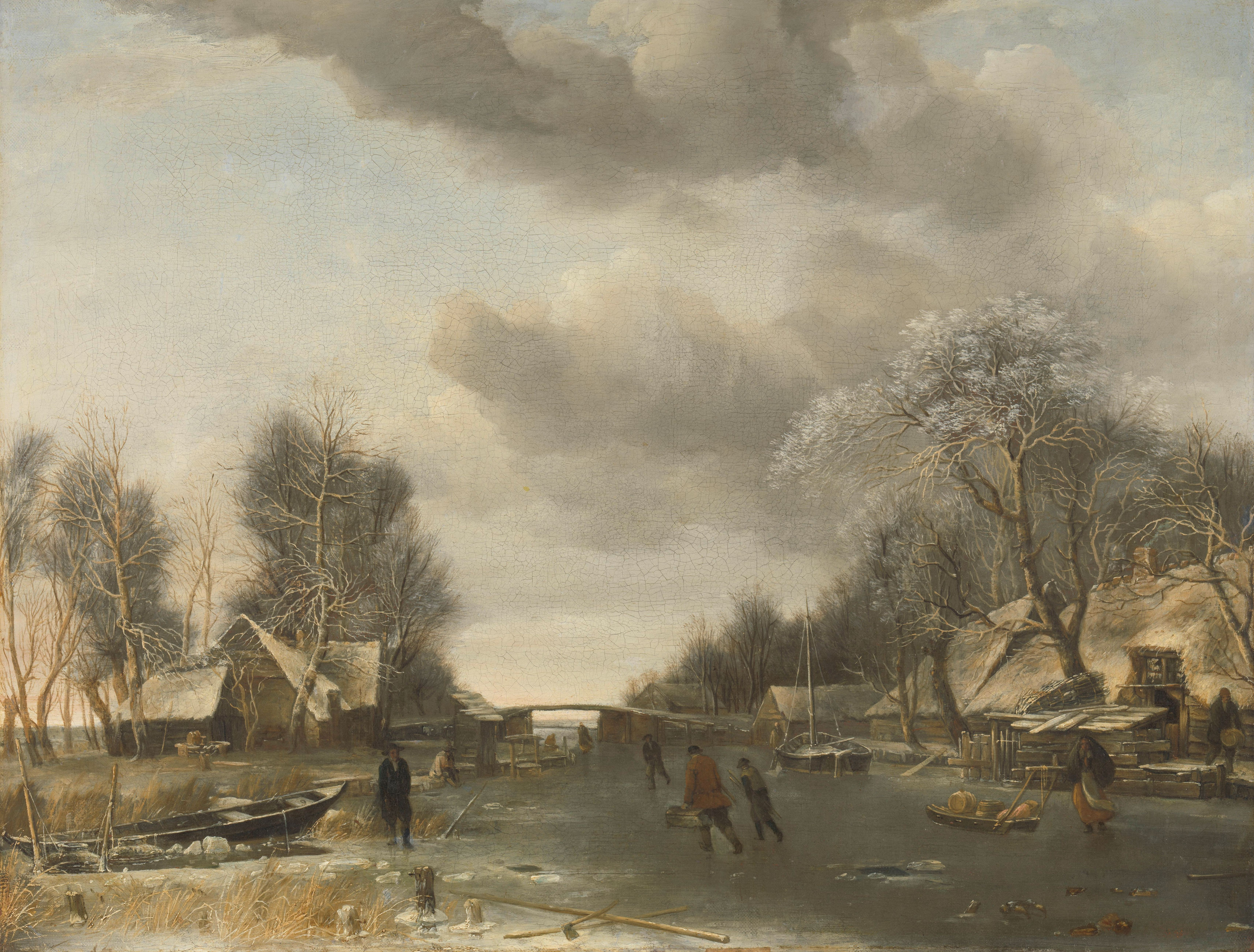
Winterlandscape, Rijksmuseum

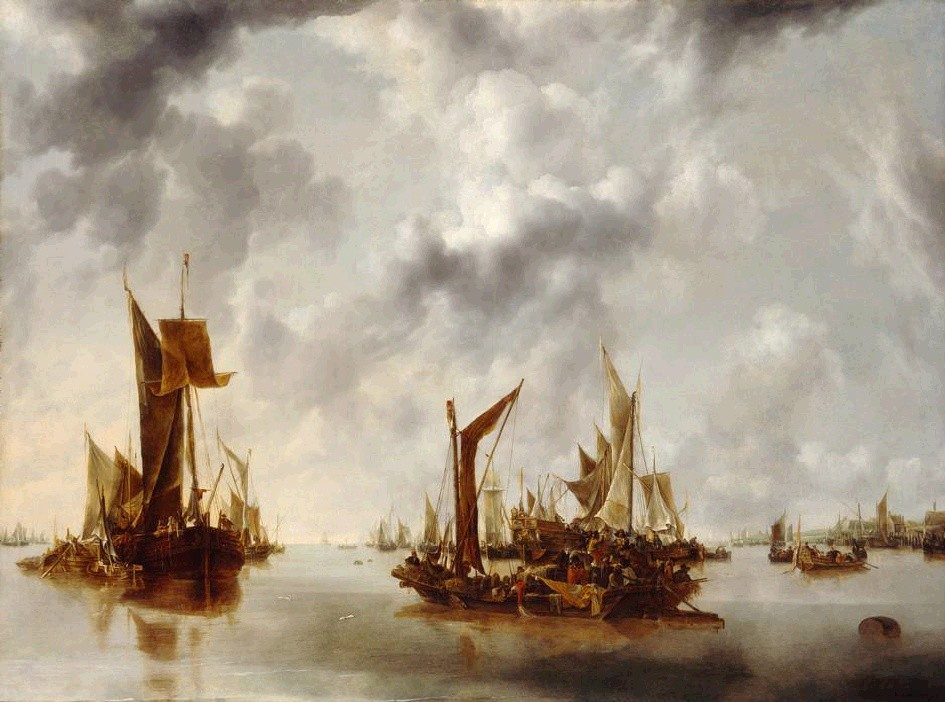
A Calm, 1654

Abraham Bredius suggested Van de Cappelle was a friend of Rembrandt, at whose insolvency sales in 1656 and 1658 he was a large buyer, and who painted portraits of him and his wife. It has been speculated that he may have used his business contacts to help obtain the commission for Rembrandt's last, and financially very useful, group portrait commission, the Syndics of the Drapers' Guild of 1662.

His earliest dated painting is an important and already highly accomplished one from 1645, and only one is dated in the 1660s. From this most authors assume he devoted his later years to his business, in which his brother Franchois also worked. In May 1661 he bought a house in the Koestraat, near Nieuwmarkt, moving from the even more expensive Keizersgracht. The house with a garden, next to a school, was sold by a son of Sweelinck, and in the deed of purchase van de Cappelle is simply called schilder (painter) and not a master painter.

His wife predeceased him in 1677, and van de Cappelle himself was buried in the Nieuwe Kerk on 22 December 1679. He left seven children. The inventory of his property at death has survived and is the main source of information about his impressive art collection. It took seven months to list all. He left his children six houses, a country house south of Loenen on the river Vecht (Utrecht), a pleasure yacht, "44 bags of ducats", silk and bonds together valued at 92,720 guilders. A lengthy list of the items from his splendid wardrobe was made, (including his violet stockings) as well as a list of his large and important art collection.

== Works ==
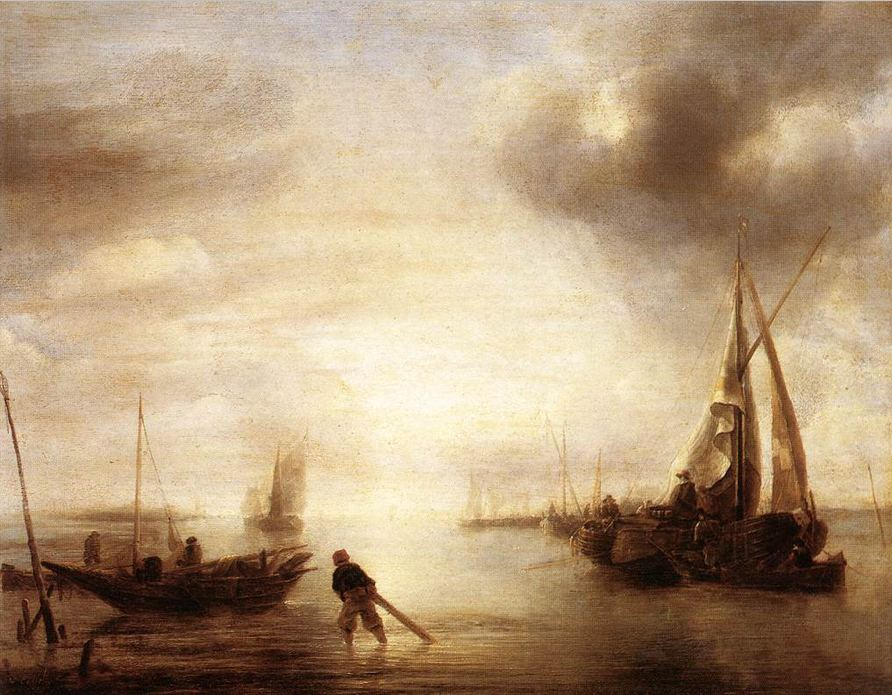
A Calm, 1650–1655

The majority of his works are marine or river views, nearly always with several vessels, but he also left a number of small winter landscapes somewhat in the manner of Aert van der Neer; these all seem to date between 1652 and 1654. His seascapes (using the term loosely) may be large or small; the nine examples in the National Gallery, London, the largest group in a single collection, vary between 122 x 154.5 cm (NG 967: 48 x 61 inches) and 34.8 x 48.1 cm (NG 865: 14 x 19 inches).

He had no interest in rough seas or cloudless skies, showing large cloudy skies, with the horizon low, about 15-20% of the way up the vertical axis. The clouds are often mirrored in the dead calm water, although light ripples may be shown. As is often the case in Dutch seascapes, there is often a warship or "statenjacht" ("States yacht"), an official yacht used for transport, official salutes and other business. The edge of the composition often slices through vessels, leaving them half seen. Van de Cappelle painted many parade marine subjects, depicting "a formal gathering of ships for a ceremonial occasion". Other paintings, mostly smaller and of less busy subjects, a type often called "calms", show "an all-pervading luminous atmosphere that softens all outlines and unifies forms and local colours", or as Kenneth Clark puts it, "When sky was reflected on water, there was achieved that unity of luminous atmosphere which is ... the whole point of van de Capelle and van de Velde".

In his early works he followed the muted palette of the "tonal school", but enlived with local highlights of bright colour, but moved in his later works to "a warmer golden tonality, exceptionally allowing himself a greater colouristic exuberance when setting the rosy glow of a sunset sky against water of a deep turquoise blue, as in the River Scene with Sailing Vessels (Rotterdam, Boymans–van Beuningen Museum)". According to his leading scholar, Margarita Russell, "More than any other artist of his time, with the exception only of Rembrandt, van de Cappelle was a painter of light".

Cappelle made a small number of etchings; only two signed ones of landscapes are now firmly attributed to him. Fewer than twenty of the nearly 750 of his own drawings in the 1680 inventory have survived identifiably.

== Art collection ==
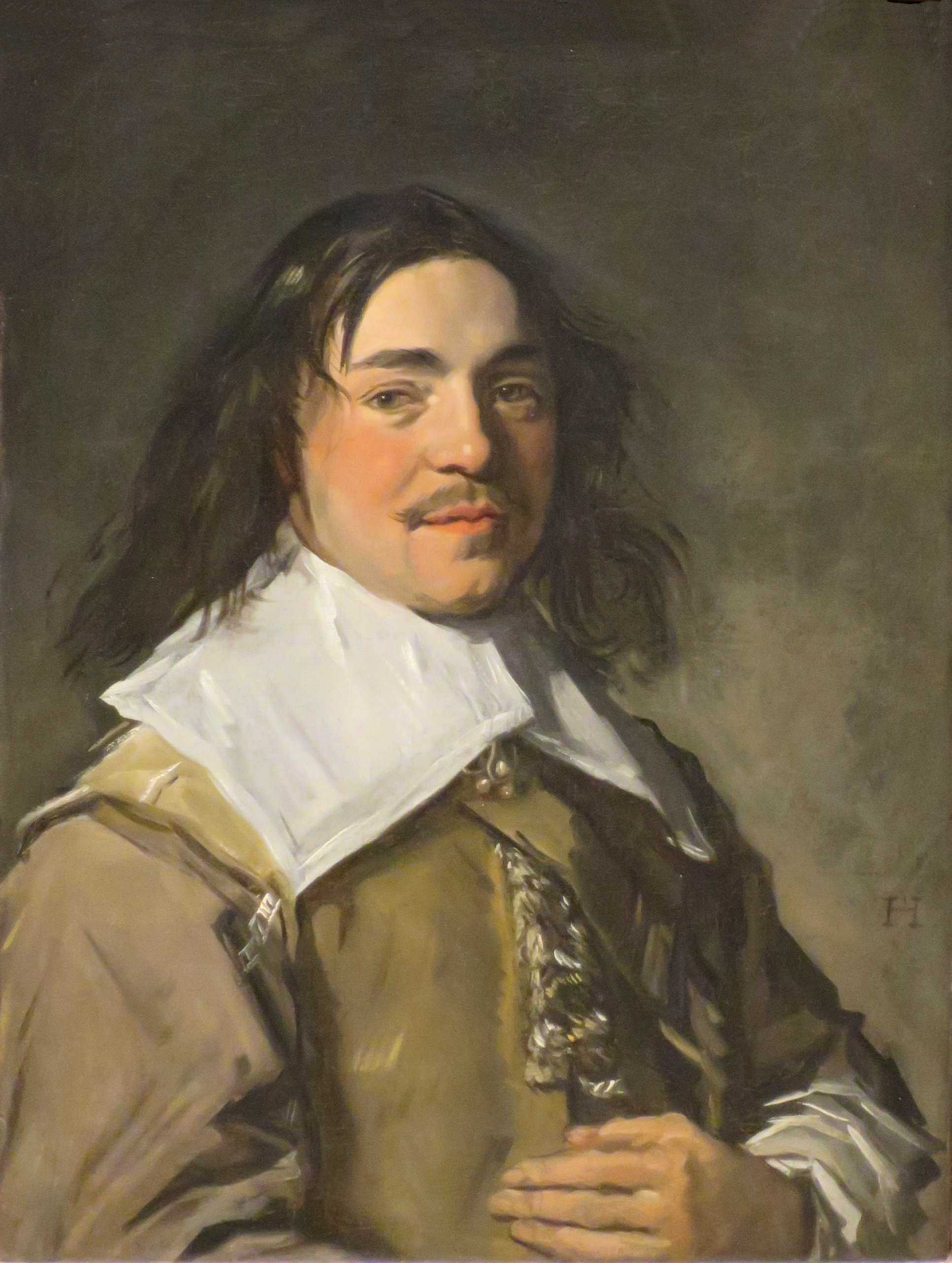
This painting by Frans Hals was formerly considered to be the lost portrait of Jan van de Cappelle

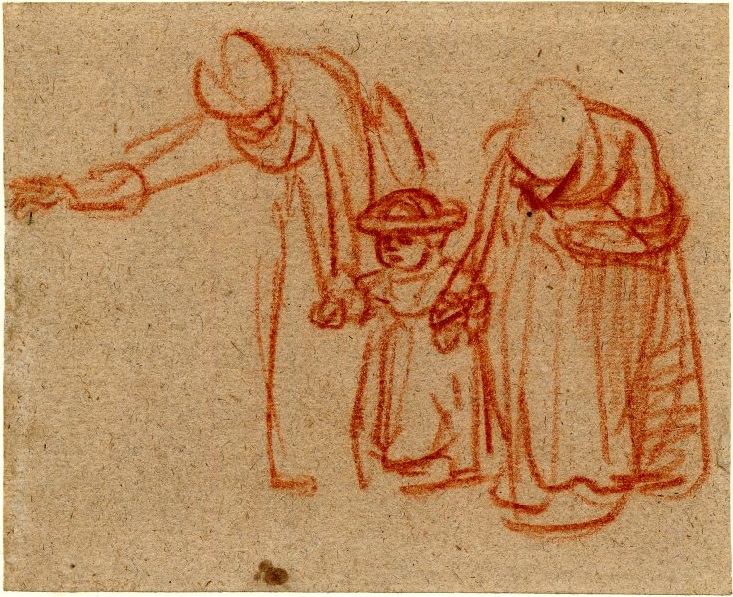
One of van de Cappelle's 500 Rembrandt drawings

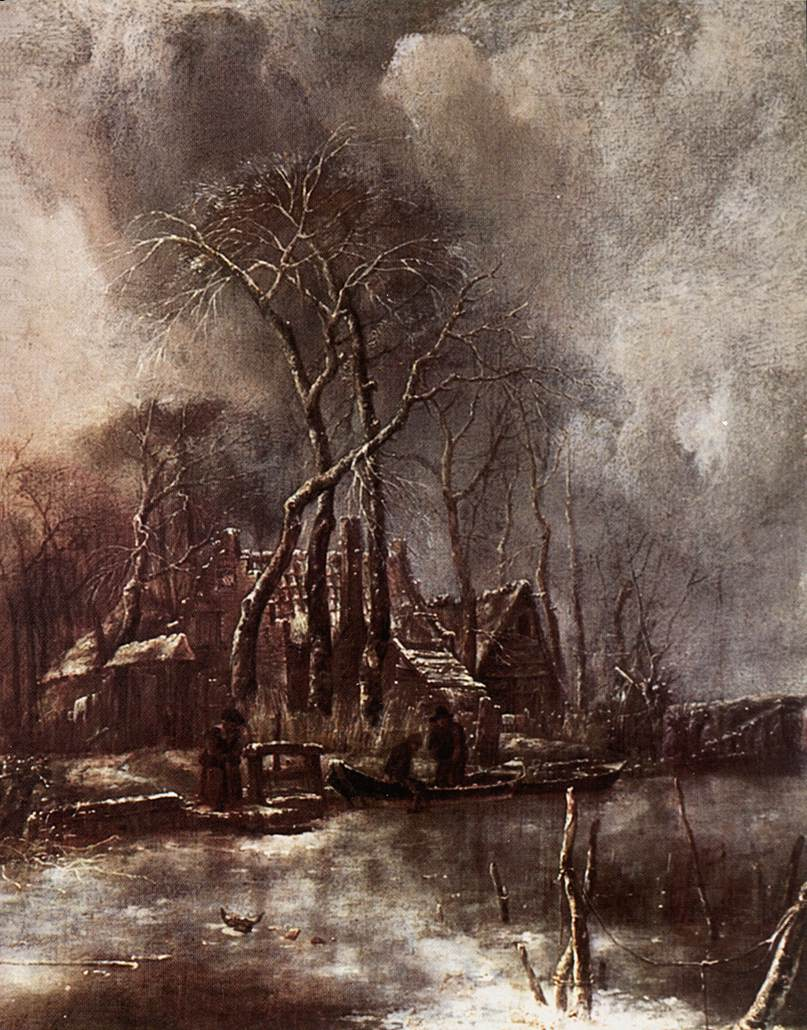
Winter Landscape

He had one of the largest art collections of his day, with 192 paintings and over 7,000 drawings, nearly all Dutch with a few Flemish works, and concentrating heavily on his own specialisms of marine painting and winter landscapes. He had portraits of himself by both Rembrandt (one of a pair with his wife) and Frans Hals, and he is the only person known to have been painted by both of the greatest Dutch portraitists. However, if they survive the identity of both paintings has been lost. The Rembrandt was claimed to be a portrait of an artist of 1648, once at Castle Howard, and in 1961 Norton Simon bought a Hals then called a portrait of Cappelle, but now just Portrait of a Young Man. There were also portraits by Gerbrandt van den Eeckhout and Jan van Noordt, also untraced.

The collection had major groups as follows:

- Rembrandt: 7 paintings and five portfolios with over 500 drawings, including 56 "histories", an album of 135 drawings of women and children, and 300 landscape drawings - almost all those known of the last two types. This was the largest group of Rembrandt drawings ever owned by a collector.
- Simon de Vlieger: 9 paintings and over 1,300 drawings including one unfinished painting,
- Jan van Goyen: 10 paintings and over 400 drawings
- Jan Porcellis: 16 paintings
- Hendrick Avercamp: paintings and nearly 900 drawings
- Hercules Segers: 5 paintings, a large proportion of his known output and perhaps bought from Rembrandt.
- There were seven paintings listed, one unfinished, made by van de Cappelle himself, but between 800 drawings, perhaps around 1150, including works described as copies by him after Porcellis and de Vlieger
- Several portfolios with drawings by Esias van de Velde (88), Pieter van Laer (41), Willem Buytewech (86), Pieter de Molijn (57), and Allaert van Everdingen (52)

The collection included paintings by Jan Lievens, Hendrick Goltzius, Paulus Potter, Adam Elsheimer, Dürer, David Vinckboons, Pieter Aertsen, Holbein, Jacob Pynas, Jan Miense Molenaer, Maarten van Heemskerck, Frans Floris, Philips Koninck and Pieter Lastman; Flemish artists represented included Rubens (three paintings), Van Dyck, Jacob Jordaens, Pieter Bruegel the Elder and Adriaen Brouwer. Van de Capelle owned 83 drawings by Jan den Uyl. The large groups of drawings by individual artists suggest that he had bought their studio stock of working drawings complete after their death or retirement. The Rembrandt drawings were probably acquired at his insolvency sales in 1656 and 1658.

== Reputation and location of works ==
Van de Cappelle had a considerable influence on painters of both marine and winter subjects, including Willem van de Velde the Younger in the former group, Jan van Kessel in the latter, and Hendrick Dubbels in both.

Van de Cappelle does not seem to have participated much in the commercial art world of his day, which may account for his absence from all the contemporary collections of artists' biographies such as the over 500 lives by Arnold Houbraken's in his De groote schouwburg der Nederlandsche kunstschilders en schilderessen – "The Great Theatre of Dutch Painters", (1718–21). Joachim von Sandrart (1606–1688) and Samuel van Hoogstraten (1627–1678) also overlook him. This was also probably partly the result of the biographers' following contemporary prejudices against marine, landscape, and still life painting, regarded as the lowest in the hierarchy of genres. He was for long perhaps better known in England than Holland, and the distribution of his works still reflects this.

The largest collection of his work is the nine paintings in London, as mentioned above. There are works in the Rijksmuseum, the Mauritshuis, Rijksmuseum Twenthe, in the Getty Museum, Metropolitan Museum of Art, National Museum of Wales, Detroit Institute of Arts, Manchester Art Gallery (3), Nationalmuseum, Wallraf-Richartz Museum and elsewhere.
