= The River Valley =

C. 1626–1630 painting by Hercules Seghers

River Valley
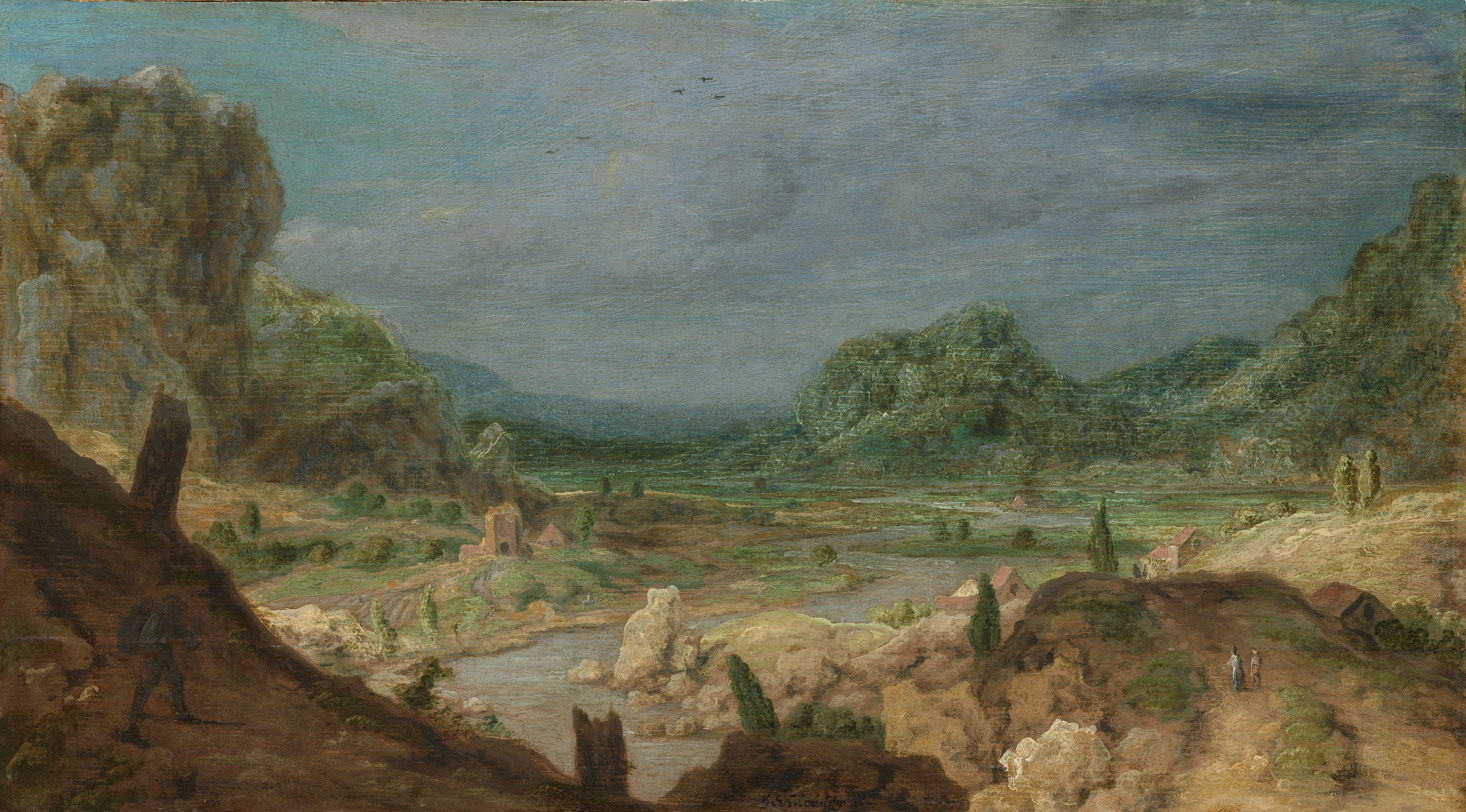
- Artist: Hercules Seghers
- Year: 17th century
- Medium: oil paint, panel
- Dimensions: 30 cm (12 in) × 53.5 cm (21.1 in)
- Location: Rijksmuseum, Netherlands
- Accession: SK-A-3120

The River Valley is a c. 1626–1630 painting by the Dutch artist Hercules Seghers (c. 1589/90–1640). It is now in the Rijksmuseum, in Amsterdam, which acquired it in May 1931.
