= Hercules Seghers =

Dutch painter and engraver (c.1589 – c.1638)

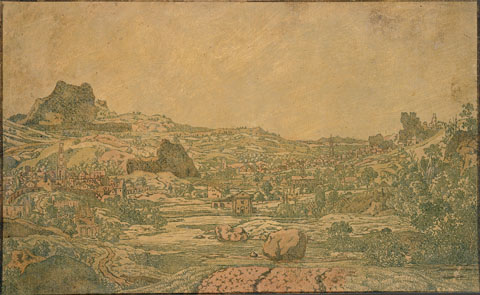
- Hercules Seghers, Town with four towers, c. 1631; etching & drypoint. Cincinnati Art Museum. A typically unusual etching: printed in green on coloured cotton, and worked over with grey and black washes.
- Born: Hercules Pieterszoon Seghers c. 1589; Haarlem
- Died: c. 1638
- Known for: Painting, Printmaking, Landscape art
- Movement: Dutch Golden Age

Hercules Pieterszoon Seghers or Segers (c. 1589 – c. 1638) was a Dutch painter and printmaker of the Dutch Golden Age. He has been called "the most inspired, experimental and original landscapist" of his period and an even more innovative printmaker.

== Life ==
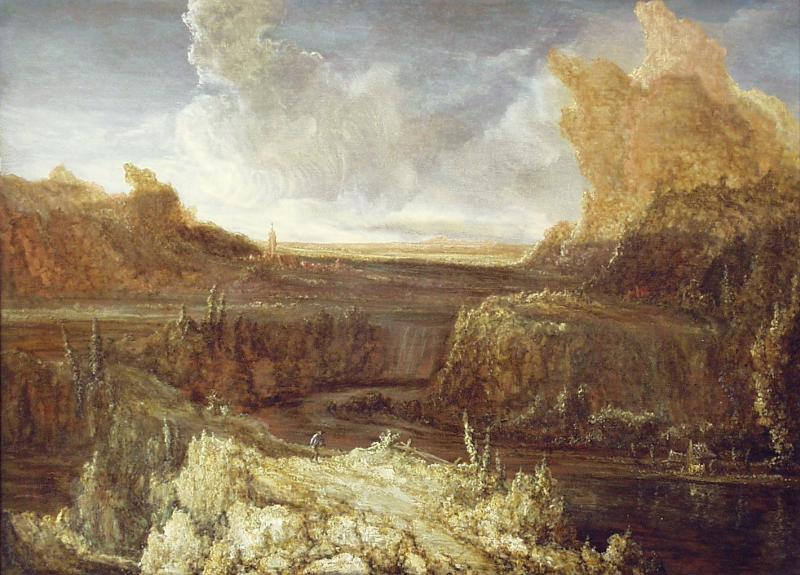
Mountainous Landscape, c. 1650; oil on panel by Seghers. Bredius Museum, Hague – destroyed by fire in Oct. 2007.

Hercules was born in Haarlem, the son of Cathalina Hercules and Pieter Seghers, a Mennonite cloth merchant, originally from Flanders, who moved to Amsterdam in 1596. There Hercules was apprenticed to the leading Flemish landscapist of the day, Gillis van Coninxloo, but his apprenticeship was presumably cut short by Coninxloo's death in 1606. Seghers and his father bought a number of his works at the auction of the studio contents, as Pieter Lastman did. Seghers' father died in 1612, after which he returned to Haarlem, joining the Haarlem Guild of St. Luke.

He returned to Amsterdam in 1614 to obtain custody of an illegitimate daughter, and the following year married Anneken van der Brugghen from Antwerp, who was sixteen years older than he was. In 1620 he bought a large house in the Jordaan on the Lindengracht for about 4,000 guilders, but by the late 1620s he was in debt, and in 1631 had to sell it. From his studio at the top of the house, which was pulled down in 1912, he had a view on the recently finished Noorderkerk, which is on one of his etchings.

In the same year he moved to Utrecht and started to sell art. In 1633 he moved to the Hague. He appears to have died by 1638, when a Cornelia de Witte is mentioned as widow of a "Hercules Pieterz". Like much of the detailed documentation of Segher's life, this link depends on the assumed rarity of his first name. Some later sources said that Seghers took to drink towards the end of his life and died after falling down the stairs.

His posthumous reputation was boosted by the Inleyding tot de hooge schoole der schilderkonst (Introduction to the High School of Painting) of Samuel van Hoogstraten, which presented him rather as a Romantic genius avant la lettre, lonely, poor and misunderstood, based mostly on his etchings. Hoogstraeten's description of Segher's life is included in the chapter "How the Artist Should Behave in the Face of Adverse Fortune", wherein he depicts Seghers as an idiosyncratic talent, hounded by misfortune and economic instability.

== Prints ==
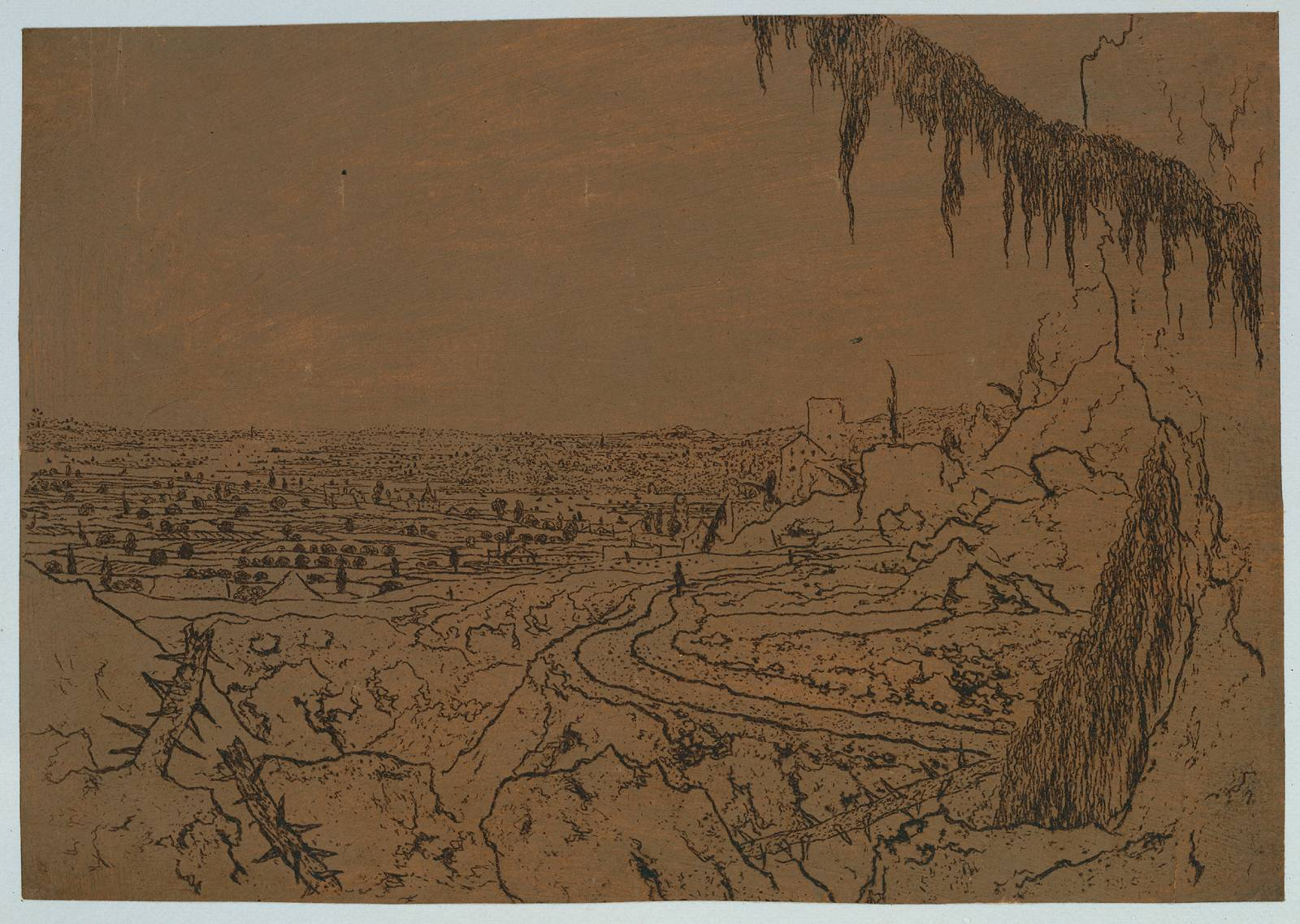
Landscape with Fir, c. 1620–30; etching on painted paper, in Rijksmuseum

He is mainly known for his highly innovative etchings, mostly of landscapes, which were often printed on coloured paper or cloth, and with coloured ink, and hand-coloured and often hand-cropped to different sizes. He also made use of drypoint and a form of aquatint as well as other effects, such as running coarse cloth through the press with the print, for a mottled effect.

Altogether only 183 known impressions survive from all his fifty-four plates and most are now in museums; the Rijksmuseum print room has easily the best collection. Rembrandt collected both paintings (he had eight) and prints by Seghers, and acquired one of his original plates, Tobias and the Angel (HB 1), which he reworked into his own Flight into Egypt (B 56), keeping much of the landscape. Rembrandt also reworked the Seghers painting Mountain Landscape, now in the Uffizi, and his landscape style shows some influence from Seghers.

Although the dating of his prints remains unclear, his Town with four towers (HB 29) is believed both to be one of the later prints and, by comparison with paintings, to date from around 1631. Given the small number of surviving impressions, it is unlikely that prints were a major source of income for him. His Pile of books (see Rijksmuseum link) is an unusual still-life subject for a 17th-century print.

He seems to have invented the "sugar-bite" aquatint technique, which was rediscovered in England over a century later by Alexander Cozens (it is also called lift-ground etching).

== Paintings ==
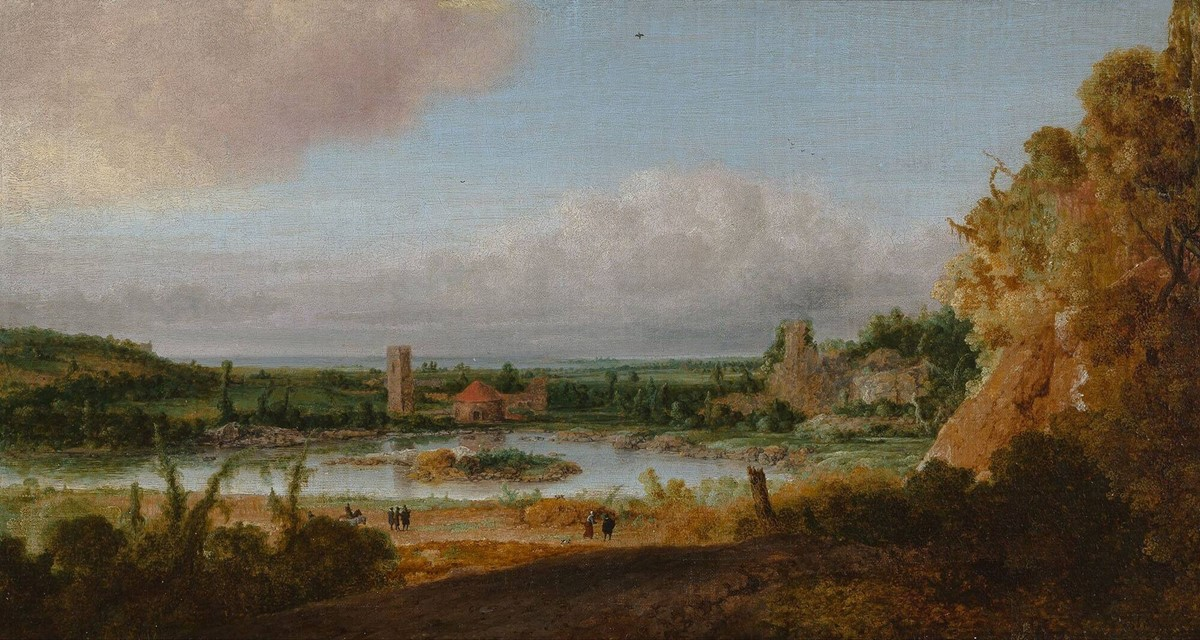
Panoramic Landscape, c. 1625; oil on canvas, mounted on panel Museum Boymans-van Beuningen, only attributed to Seghers since 1951.

Hercules Seghers was probably best known to his contemporaries for his paintings of landscapes and still-life subjects such as The River Valley; his paintings are also rare, with perhaps only fifteen surviving (one was destroyed in a fire in October 2007). The Stadholder, Frederick Henry, Prince of Orange bought landscapes in 1632. Many of his painted landscapes are fantastic mountainous compositions, whereas in his prints it is often the technical approach rather than the subject which is extreme.

Seghers painted landscapes tend to show a wide horizontal view, with emphasis on earth rather than sky; two in the Gemäldegalerie, Berlin had strips of sky added at the top later in the century to meet a changed taste. Apart from Coninxloo, Seghers drew from the Flemish landscape tradition, perhaps especially Joos de Momper and Roelandt Savery, but also the "fantastic and visionary aspects of Mannerist" landscape painting. The 1680 inventory of the collection of the marine painter Jan van de Cappelle, who owned five paintings by Seghers, describes one as a view of Brussels, which if correct would presumably mean Seghers traveled there, probably when young, when his style shows most Flemish influence (in so far as the chronology of his work is clear).

== Gallery ==
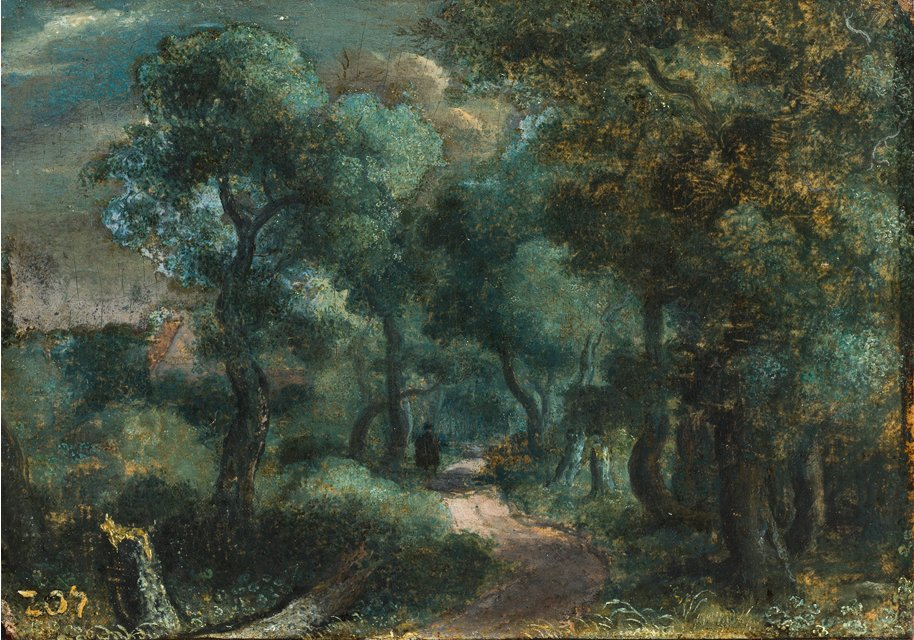
Seghers, Woodland Path, c. 1618-20; canvas on panel

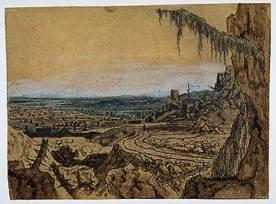
Seghers, Landscape with overhanging fir, c. 1615-30; etching on paper, hand-coloured

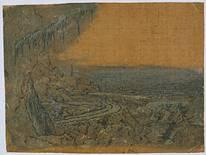
Seghers, Landscape with overhanging fir, c. 1615-30; etching and colour on linen

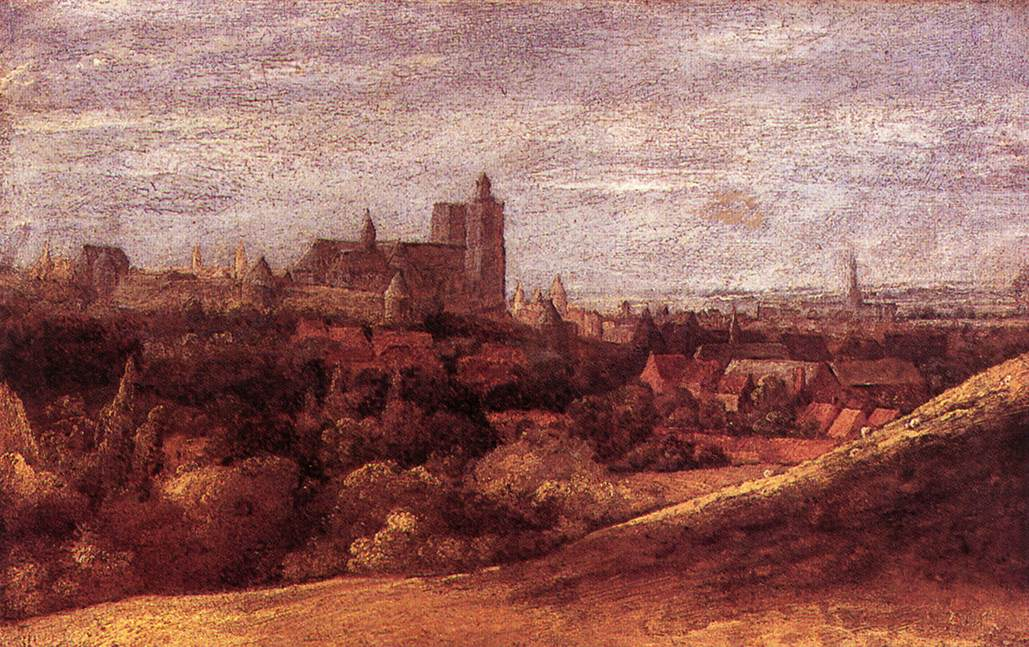
Seghers, View of Brussels from the North-East, c. 1625; oil on panel

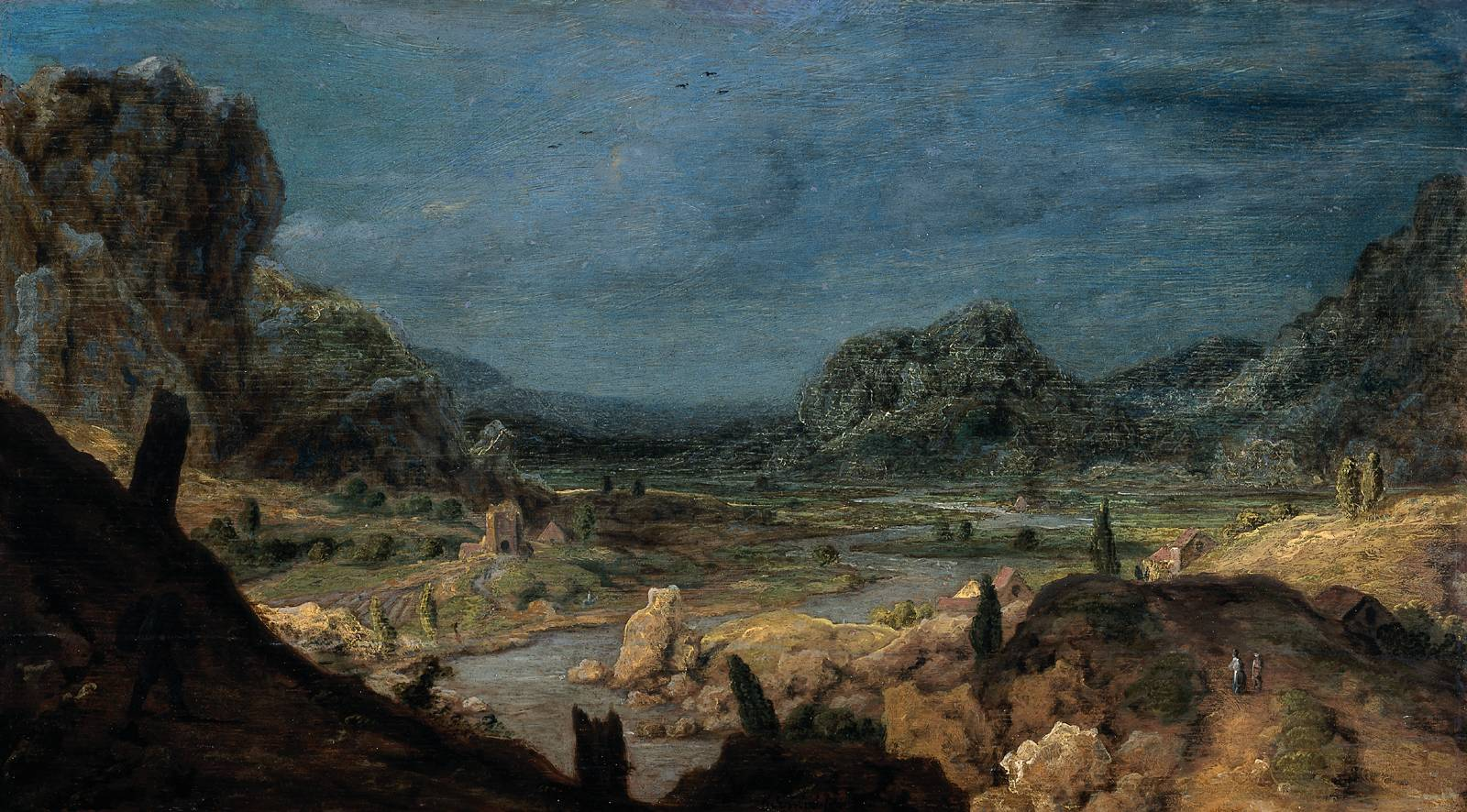
Seghers, River Valley, c. 1626-30; oil on panel

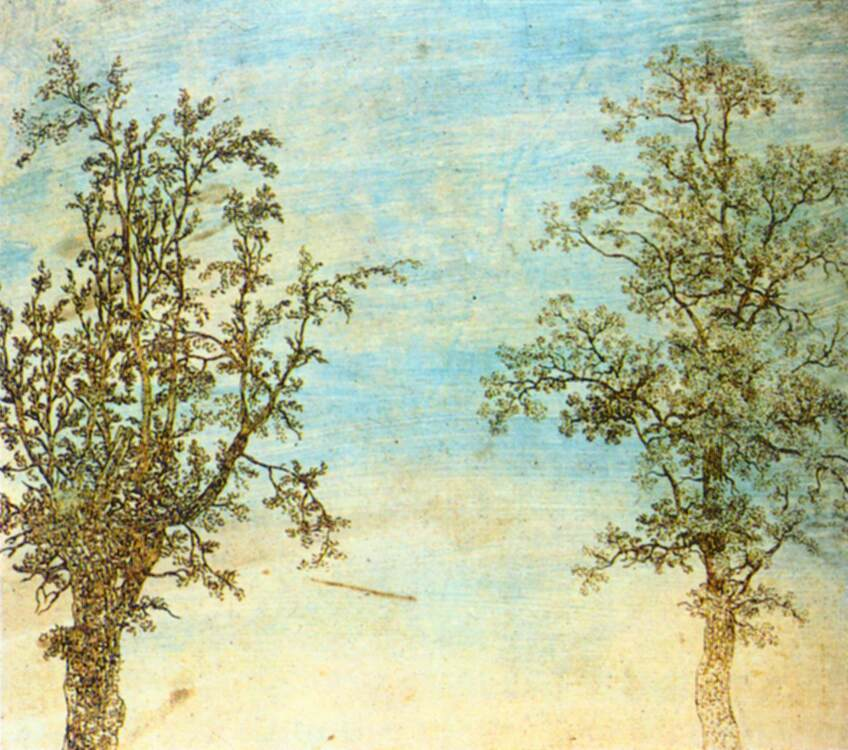
Seghers, The two Trees, c. 1620-30; etching in brown ink

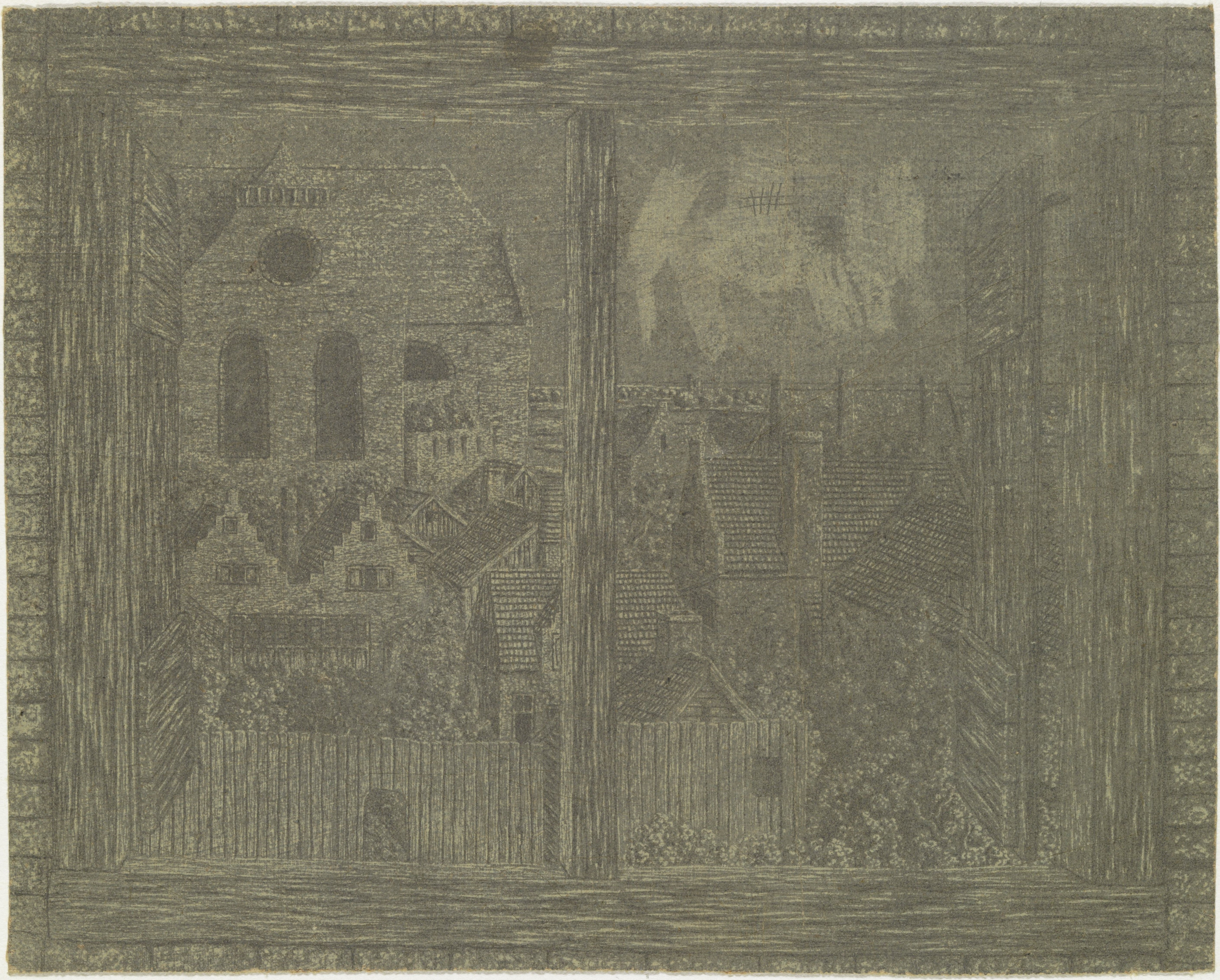
Seghers, View of the Noorderkerk (church in Amsterdam), c. 1622-30; etching on linen

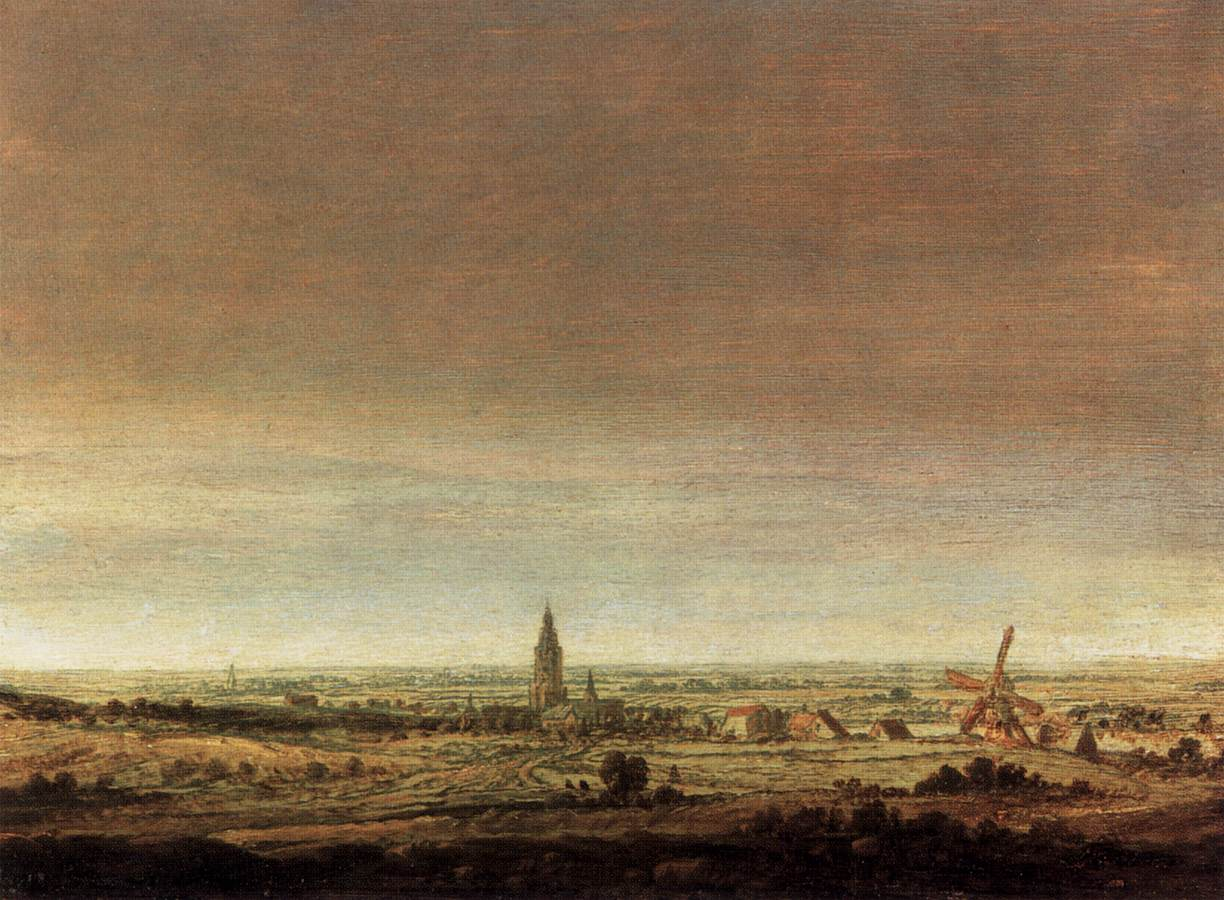
Seghers, Landscape with City on a River, c. 1627-29; oil-painting on oak panel

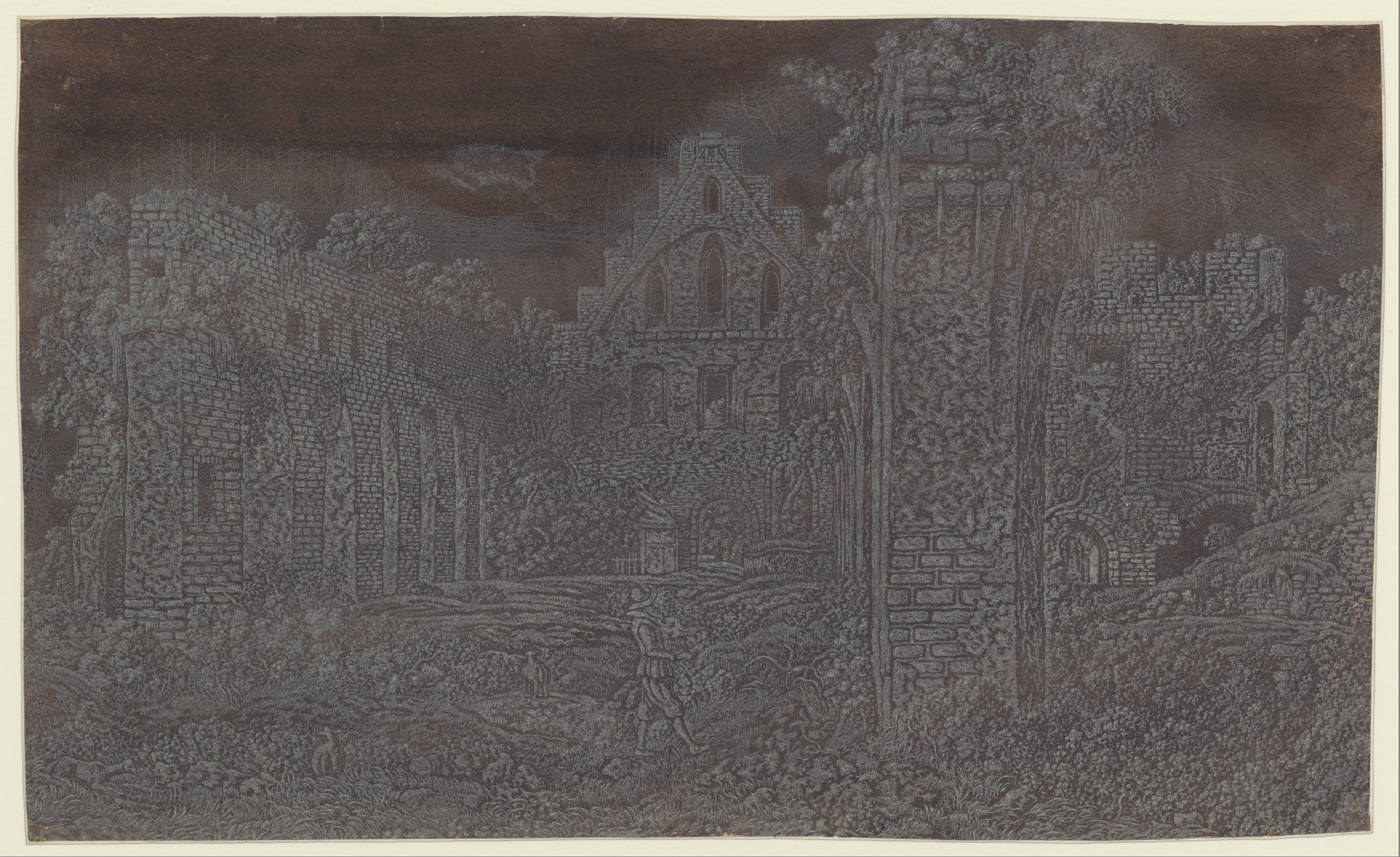
Seghers, Ruins of a large church, c. 1629-38; print

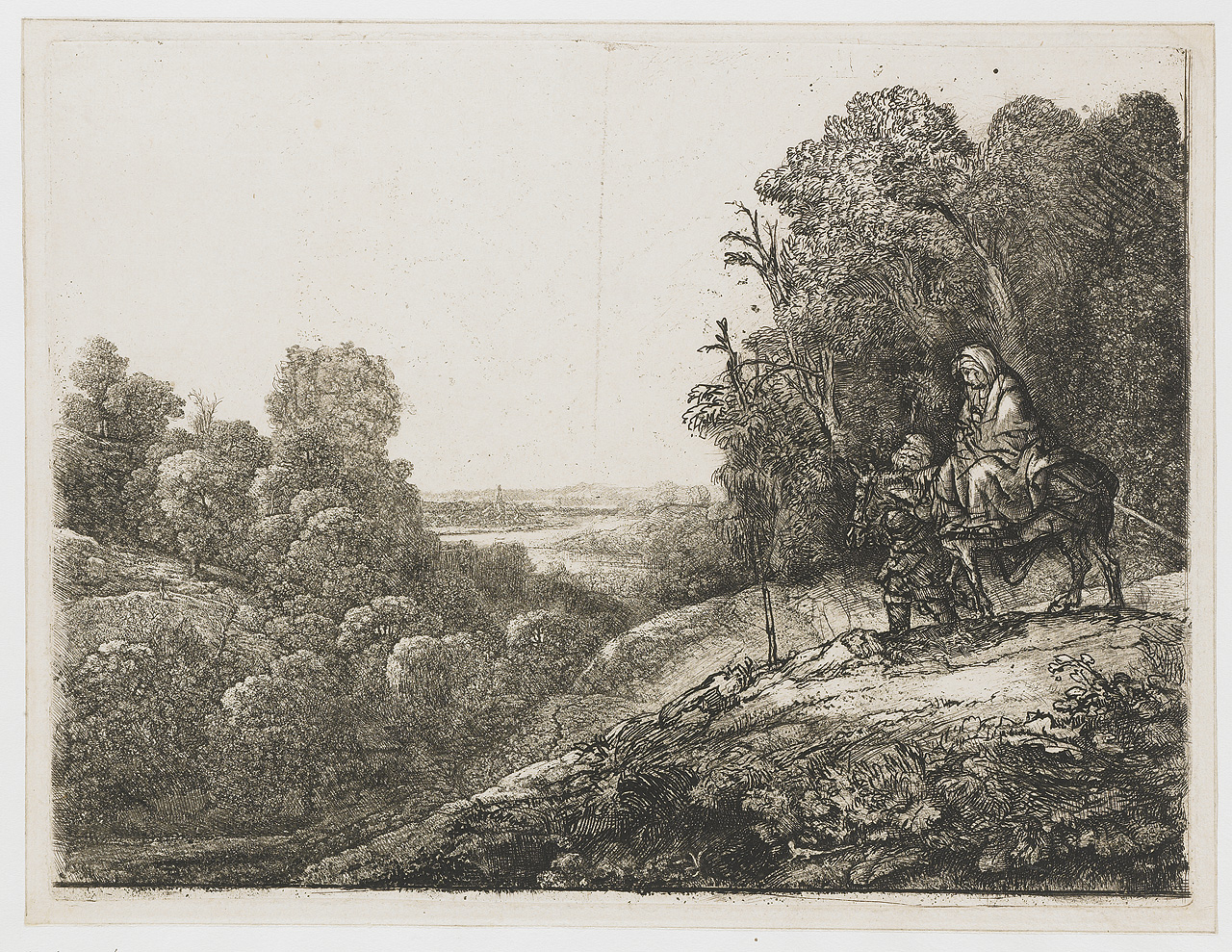
Seghers & (thereafter) Rembrandt, Rest on the Flight into Egypt, c. 1653; etching, drypoint and burin

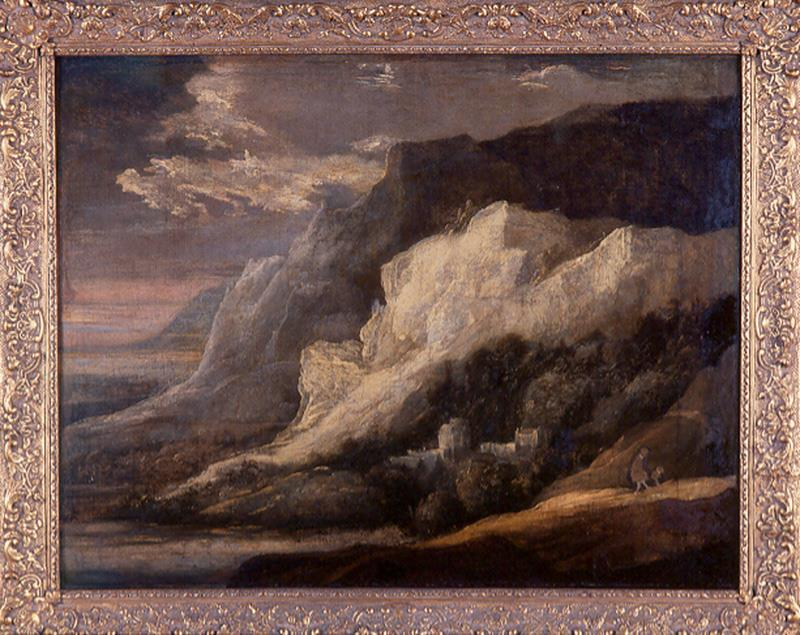
Seghers, The Landscape with the white rock, c. 1590-1640; oil-painting on canvas; Casa Museu Eva Klabin collection
