= Jan Porcellis =

Dutch painter

- Born: 1580/1584; Ghent
- Died: January 29, 1632; Zoeterwoude
- Known for: Painting
- Movement: Marine art

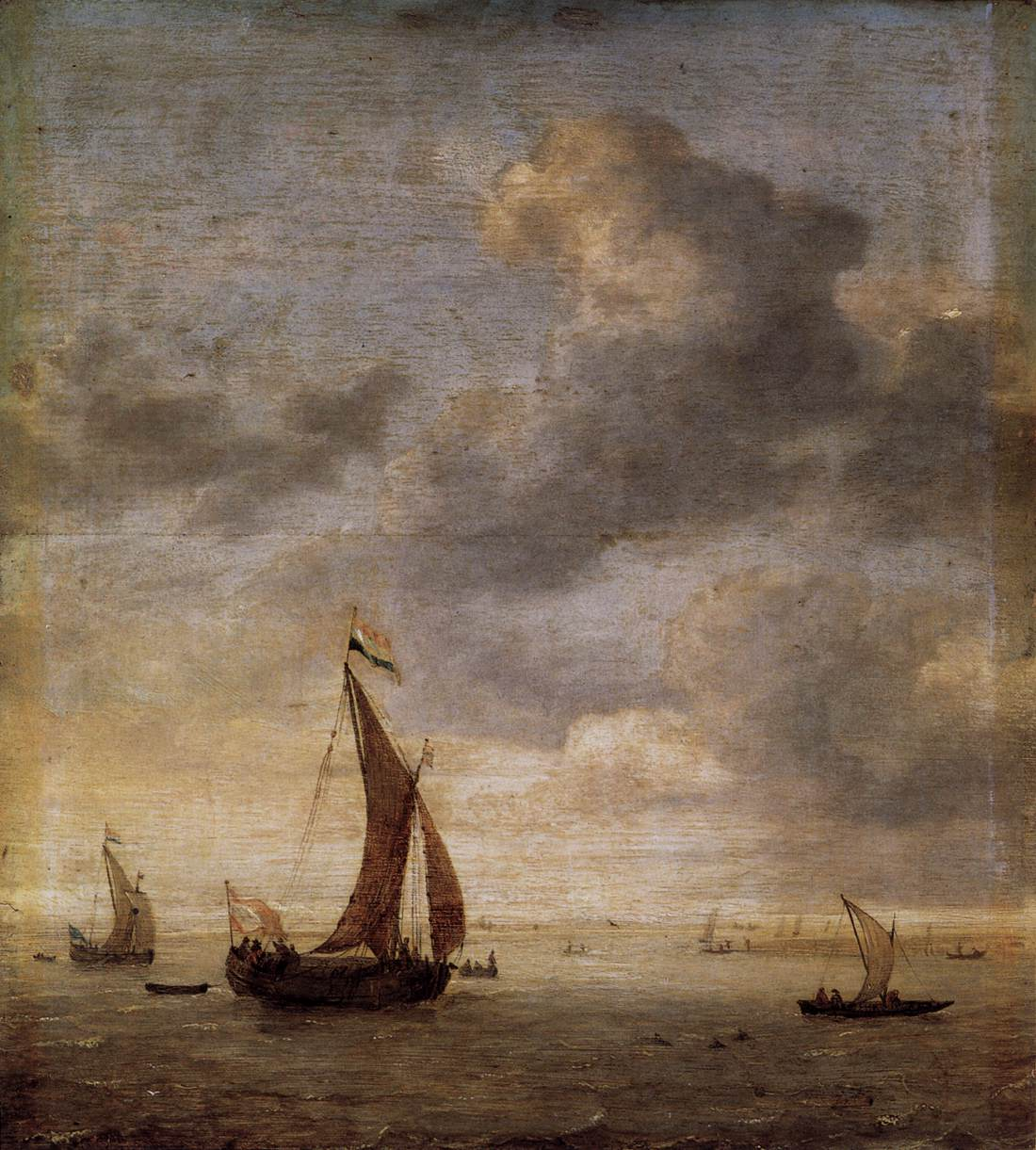

Jan Porcellis (1580/84 Ghent – 29 January 1632 Zoeterwoude) was a Dutch marine artist in the seventeenth century. His works initiated a "decisive transition from early realism to the tonal phase", fostering a new style and subject in marine painting by focusing on overcast skies and rough waters, a radical break from maritime art's previous focus on the grandeur of ships in historical settings. This style of greater simplicity surrounding maritime art, with the majority of the canvas displaying sea and sky, set the grounds for later works in this genre.

== Life ==
=== Early life and career ===
Ships in a Storm on a Rocky Coast by Jan Porcellis. Oil on canvas, 1614-1618, Hallwyl Museum.

Jan Porcellis was born at Ghent, around 1580 or 1584. Though his birth date can't be exactly determined, it can't be after 1584, since in that year his parents joined Protestants fleeing from Ghent, a city that had recently captured by Spaniards from the Northern Netherlands for a second time. He married in Rotterdam in 1605. His daughter was baptized in 1609 in Middleburg, and was an extensive traveler. According to Arnold Houbraken, Porcellis studied with Hendrick Vroom as a teacher, though this remains unproven.

His early paintings date from 1612. His style became recognizable because of the use of many different light hues, exemplified in paintings such as Storm at Sea, which includes light effects previously unseen. Also notable from this period is Porcellis' rendition of Sea Battle at Night which, as its name indicates, features a marine conflict in dim light, with enemy ships barely visible and a gradual recognition of the subjects.

By 1615, Porcellis faced financial constraints: he acquired three children, declared bankruptcy in Rotterdam and moved to Antwerp. Most of the paintings made in this period were serialized and sold in open markets; since they are not signed by Porcellis, they're considered lost. Thus, only about ten pictures from these years can be identified. Up to 1620, only about 10 works can be surely attributed to Porcellis, most of which represent battles, storms and harbor views. Prior to leaving Antwerp, the first wife of Porcellis died.

=== Later life and death ===
In 1622, Porcellis moved to Haarlem with his three children, where he married Janneke Flessiers, daughter of Balthasar Flessiers (painter and print publisher). Porcellis continued the tradition of marine painting, but the setting of his pictures was never clarified and left ambiguous; this contrasted the usual style of contemporary marine painters, such as Jan Brueghel or Vroom, who traditionally portrayed Antwerp Harbour or the Spaarne at Haarlem.

Porcellis' two years in Haarlem probably saw the beginning of his reputation and prosperity. He gained more popularity because of the detail in his paintings, particularly in portraying the Beach View of Haarlem, various of which were found scattered in other European places and palaces, such as Palazzo Venezia in Rome, or in the collection of the Emperor of Germany. In these years Porcellis' series of twenty etchings, Verscheyden Stranden en Water Gesichten, was published in Haarlem by Jan Pietersz. Porcellis soon left Haarlem and in 1624 was living in Amsterdam; by 1626 he had moved to Voorburg near The Hague. Around this time, in 1627, a set of twelve prints after Porcellis's designs were published in Amsterdam by C. J. Visscher, the Icones Variarum navium hollandicarum, the first 'iconography' of ship types since Pieter Bruegel's in 1565.

At some time between 1627 and 1629 he moved more or less permanently to Zoeterwoude in the environs of Leiden. His last years were spent in prosperity thanks to his wife's share of the estate of her stepmother, and thanks also to sales of his pictures. On 19 December 1631, Porcellis lay 'ziekelijk te bedde' in his house in Zoeterwoude, and made his will; on 29 January 1632 he died. His widow was legatee, with a provision that the third child and only son, Julius, would receive "all the paintings and works in the artist's possession at his death, to wit, those by the artist's hand and signed with his name, and no others".

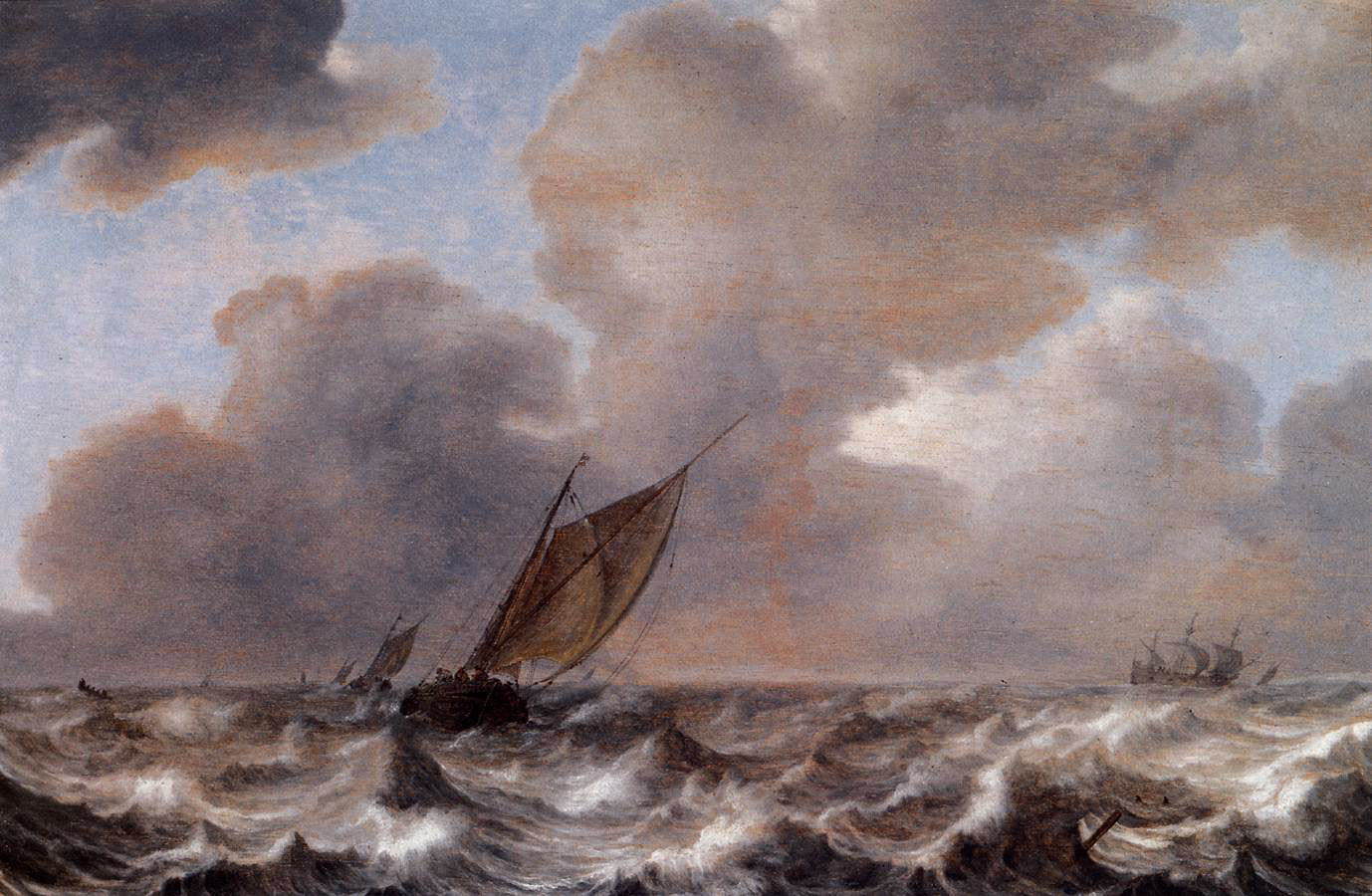
Vessels in a Strong Wind, 1630, by Jan Porcellis

== Style ==
Jan Porcellis developed in the tradition of Dutch Marine Painting. Henrick Vroom, whom Houbraken claims was Porcellis' teacher, was skillful at ship-painting, covering subjects such as fish, fishermen and other boatmen. Porcellis' earliest paintings, of the period up till 1612, demonstrated that he had mastered Vroom's style which enjoyed much popularity at the time. The Storm at Sea by Porcellis, reflects many characteristics which were important in Vroom's era, both in terms of its theatrics and in its conventions of rendering.

For all the perils he portrays, Porcellis puts less emphasis on spectacular destruction. The fact that no big ship wrecks are directly portrayed proves this point. The audience are rather invited to make out what happens gradually. Porcellis' ships sit has a solid presence in water and the grey hazy atmosphere contrasts and blurs the horizon and the ships in the distance. The mottling of the sky is projected by the sun upon the brown land which turns green in the light. These effects were never attempted by Vroom or his contemporaries, and in fact they were very advanced for this early date, which will be continued in Porcellis' lifelong preoccupation with the subtleties of weather.

Storm at Sea was the only representation of battle at night in Dutch art. In Porcellis' era, the ship was considered a metaphor for the human soul and sea voyage a symbol for human life. In account of which, the marine themes such as storm at the sea or shipwreck remind the spectator of human frailty and divine power. Whether Porcellis' paintings have a moral message is uncertain, but the arrangement as seen in Sea Battle by Night, where the fights go on the distance while fishing continues in the foreground, seems to inspire thinking on human mortality.

Nine out of ten of Porcellis' works before 1620 portray vessels of the Dutch fleet, representing battles, storms, or harbour views. This was a familiar subject by earlier sea painters as well. However, the first dated work of 1620 marks a change in his style. The panel portrays small transport vessels sailing in a fresh breeze. This was the first Dutch painting to be set in an anonymous seascape, unidentifiable with the famous ports. The masterly arrangement and stylisation of the formal elements indicate that Porcellis had reached maturity of his work at the time this panel was painted.

Jan Porcellis' Haarlem period, 1622-1624, was the beginning of his prosperous period where he produced paintings in the style of views of the beach, a local specialty. This period also saw him producing near monochrome works of sky, characterised by effective manipulations of light and shade. Porcellis' skies were groundbreaking in many respects such as setting, subtle changes in landscape, and shifting moods. Most of his mature works portray the sea as hospitable, if uncomfortable or dangerous. Porcellis' contribution to Dutch art also lies in his emphasis on the dramatic effects of light, while having a generally restrained composition.

== Legacy ==
Jan Porcellis established an original manner of Marine painting focusing on tonal effects, fostering vivid atmospheres and seascapes in a monochromatic fashion. These stylistic elements were later seen among his contemporaries such as Jan van Goyen, Pieter de Molijn, and Salomon van Ruysdael. These seascapists, more often than not, followed Porcellis in his depictions of anonymous ships surrounded by vast expanses of sea and sky (Slive 217). Rather than being commissioned, these paintings were usually made to sell on the open market, which can be reflected by the fluidity in stylistic elements not traditionally characteristic of marine painting (Slive, p. 217).

Porcellis was recognized as a remarkable painter, said to be far superior to fellow Marine painter Hendrick Vroom by Constantijn Huygens, with many prominent artists such as Rembrandt, Allart van Everdingen, Rubens, and Jan van de Cappelle collecting his works. He was celebrated by Samuel Hoogstraten as the great Raphael of marine painting, and was even honored with a poem composed by the prominent Joachim Oudaan concerning his talents. His followers included his son Julius, as well as his wife's brother, Henrick van Anthonissen, and Simon de Vlieger (Slive, p. 218).

His most famous works can be seen across the globe in not only the Netherlands, but also Russia, Germany, the UK, France, and North America. His most famous seascape paintings can be seen at the Heritage Museum in Saint Petersburg, Russia and the Rijksmuseum in Amsterdam.

== Works ==
- Ships in a Storm on a Rocky Coast (c. 1614-18), Hallwyl Museum, Stockholm, Sweden.
- Dutch Vessels in a Strong Breeze (1618), National Maritime Museum, London
- Dutch Ships in a Gale (c. 1620)
- Stormy Seas (1629), Alte Pinakothek, Munich
- Vessels in a Moderate Breeze (c. 1629), Los Angeles County Museum of Art
- Seascape (c. 1630), Hermitage, Saint Petersburg
- Fisherman Hauling Nets (1630)
- Vessels in the Strong Winds (c. 1630)
- Single-Masted Damlooper and Rowboat on a Breezy Day, Gemäldegalerie, Berlin
- Shipping in Stormy Seas
- Sea Battle at Night
- Calmy Seas, Musée des beaux-arts de Bordeaux
