= Ludolf Bakhuizen =

East Frisian painter (died 1708)

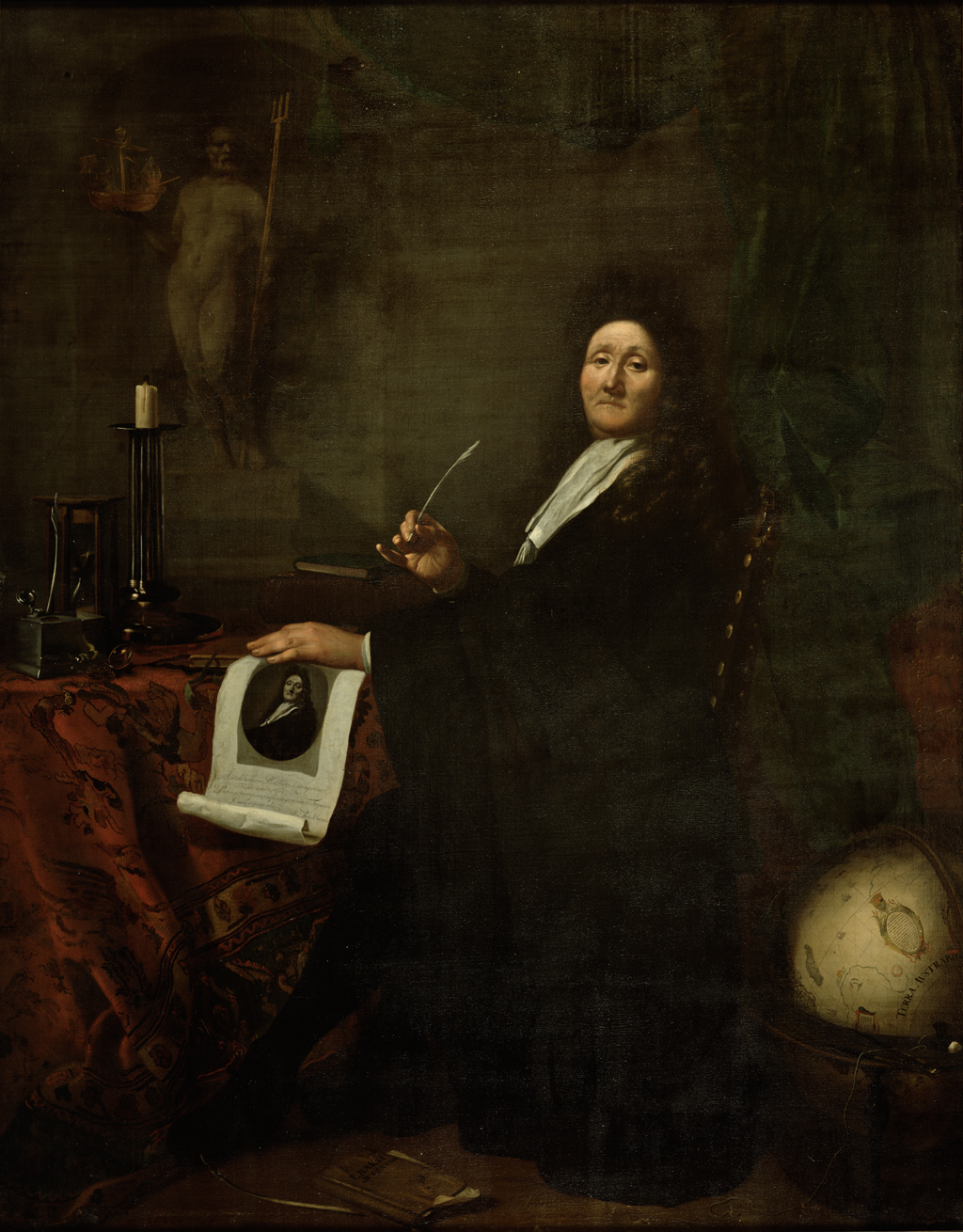
Self-portrait

Ludolf Bakhuizen (28 December 1630 or 1632 – 7 November 1708) was a German-born Dutch painter, draughtsman, calligrapher and printmaker. He was the leading Dutch painter of maritime subjects after Willem van de Velde the Elder and Younger left for England in 1672. He also painted portraits of his family and circle of friends.

== Life ==
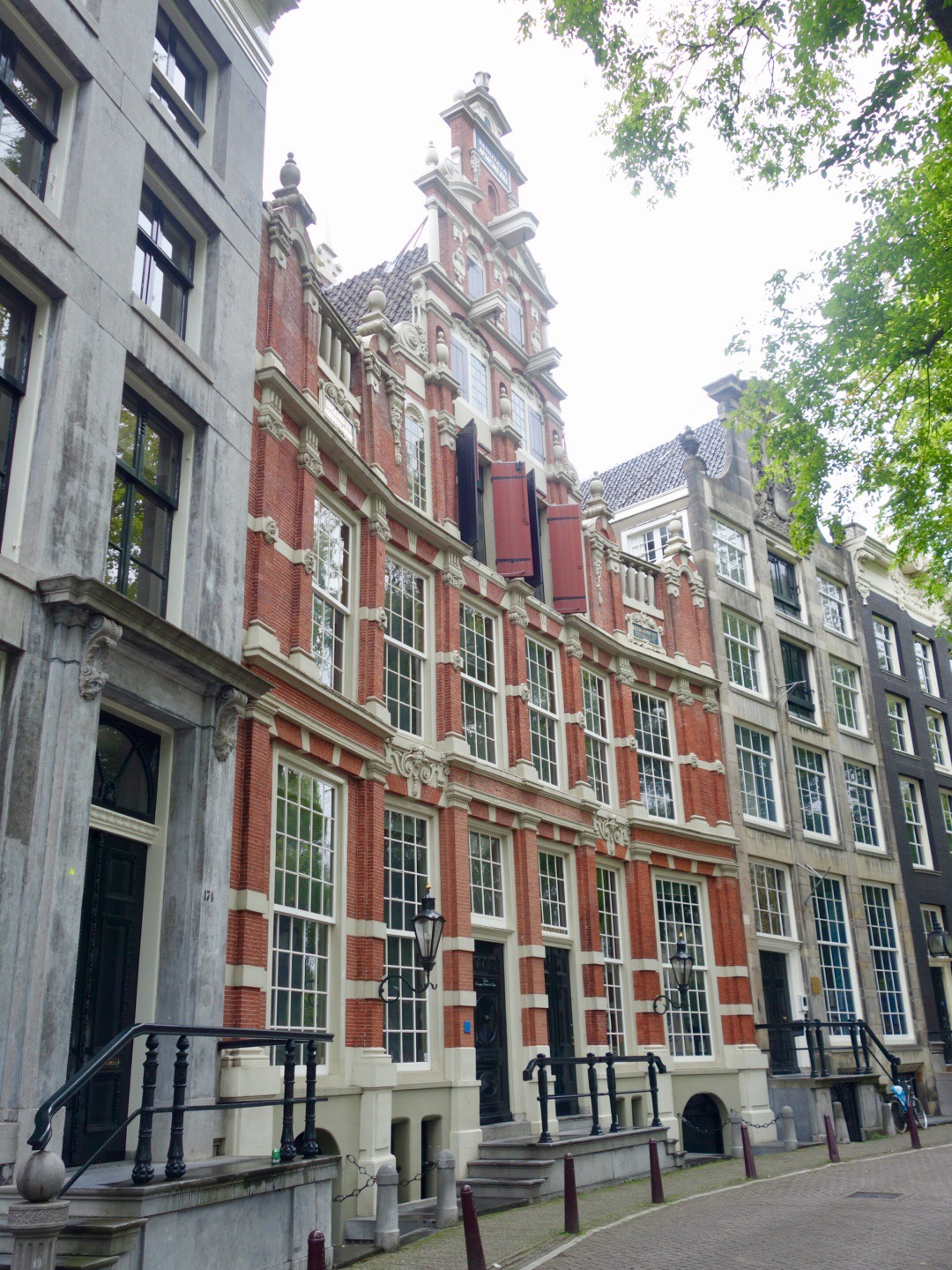
The merchant G. Bartolotti lived at Herengracht. At the end of his life Bakhuizen lived across this mansion.

He was born in Emden, East Frisia, and came to Amsterdam around 1650, working as a merchant's clerk at Herengracht. He discovered so strong a genius for painting that he relinquished the business and devoted himself to art from the late 1650s, initially in pen drawings and calligraphy. He studied first under Allart van Everdingen and then under Hendrik Dubbels, two eminent masters of the time, and soon became celebrated for his sea-pieces, which often depicted violent water. In 1663 he became a member of the painters guild. He was influenced by Willem van de Velde the Elder. Bakhuizen assisted Bartholomeus van der Helst in 1668.

He was an ardent student of nature, and frequently exposed himself on the sea in an open boat in order to study the effects of storms. His compositions, which are numerous, are nearly all variations of one subject — the sea — and in a style peculiarly his own, marked by intense realism or faithful imitation of nature. He moved frequently as he married four times and lived at Haarlemmerstraat, Nes, N.Z. Voorburgwal, Rozengracht, Singel across the Doelen, and at Herengracht 193 (between Oude Leliestraat and Driekoningenstraat) which was sold in 1749.

In his later years Bakhuizen employed his skills in etching; he also painted a few examples each of several other genres of painting, such as portraits, landscapes and genre paintings. Bakhuizen painted portraits of his large circle of friends. These are of lesser artistic value but provide an insight into his good relations with contemporary scholars and literary figures.

During his life Bakhuizen was visited by Cosimo III de' Medici in 1669 and Peter the Great in 1697; he also worked for various German princes. In 1699 he opened a gallery on the top floor of the Amsterdam town hall. After a visit to England he was buried on 12 November 1708 at Westerkerk. Their son Johannis (1683-) was mute and had to be taken care of after his mother died in 1717.

== Gallery ==
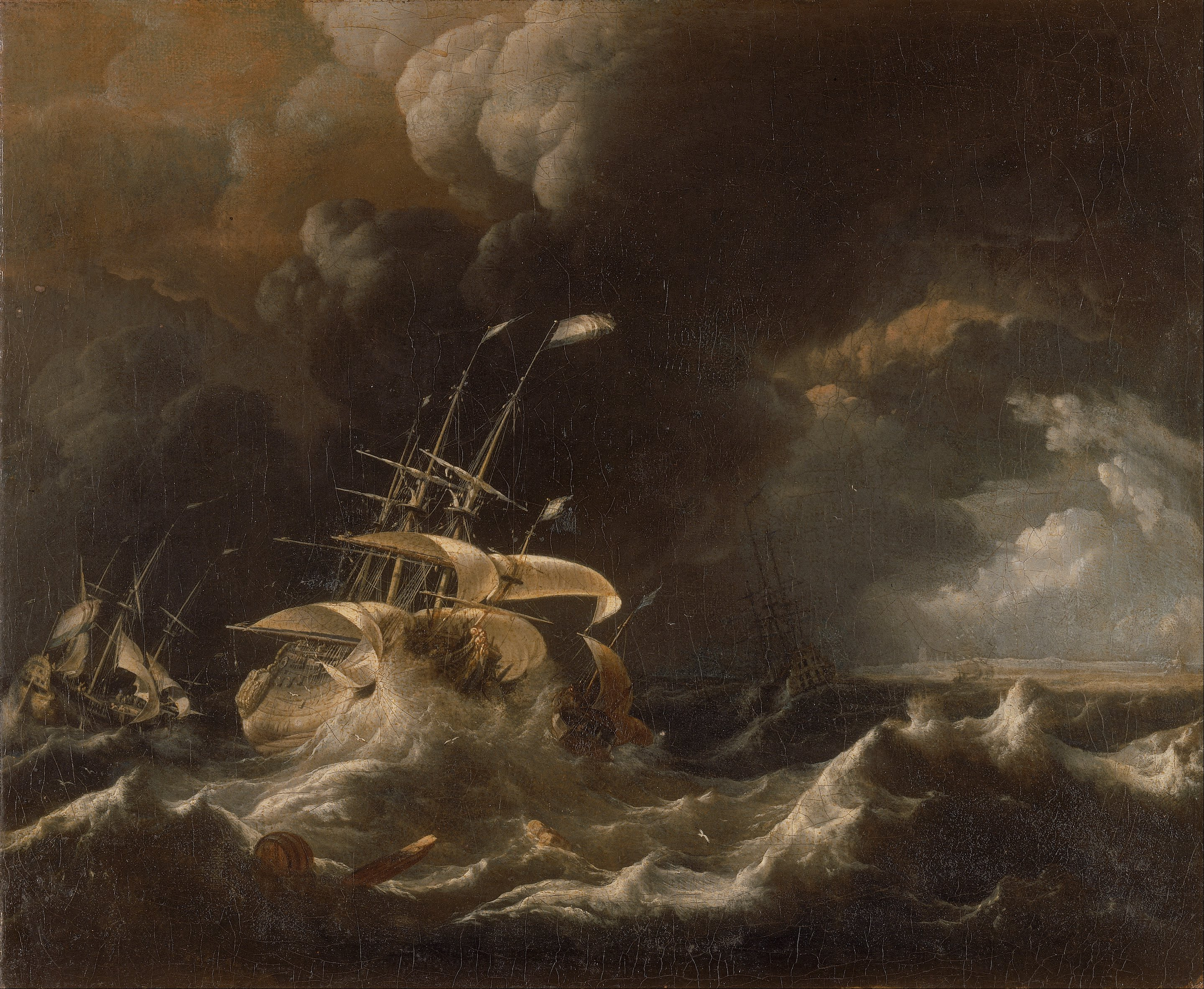
Ships in a Storm, 1670s - 1690s

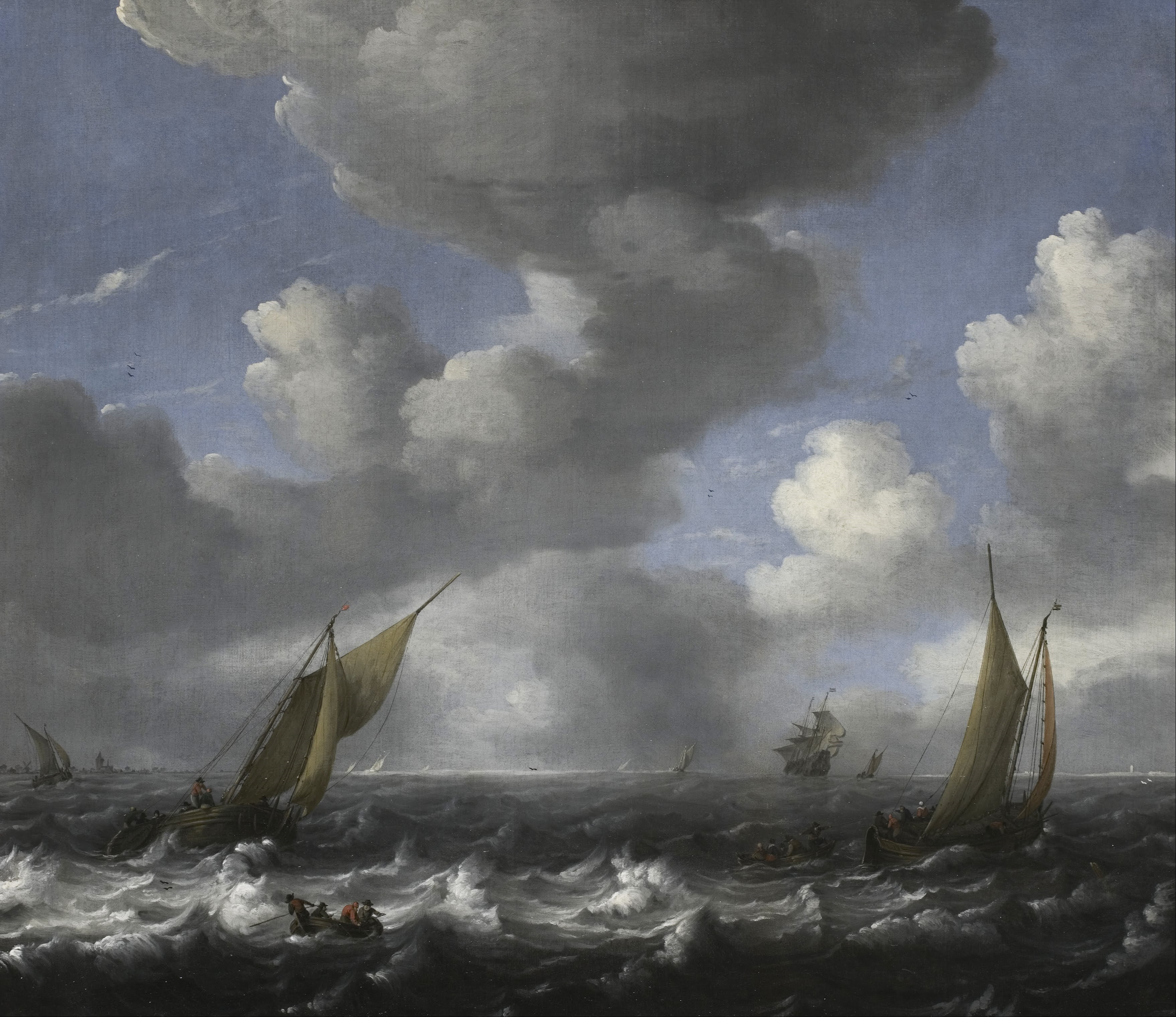
Seascape and Fishing Boats, 1708

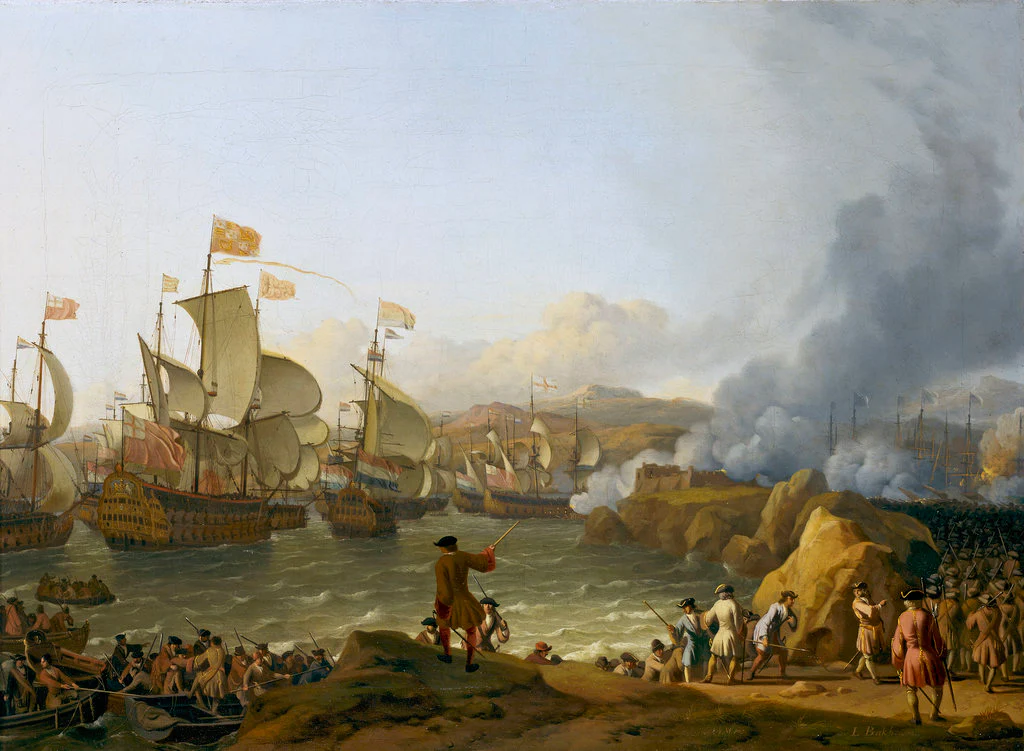
Battle of Vigo Bay 1702

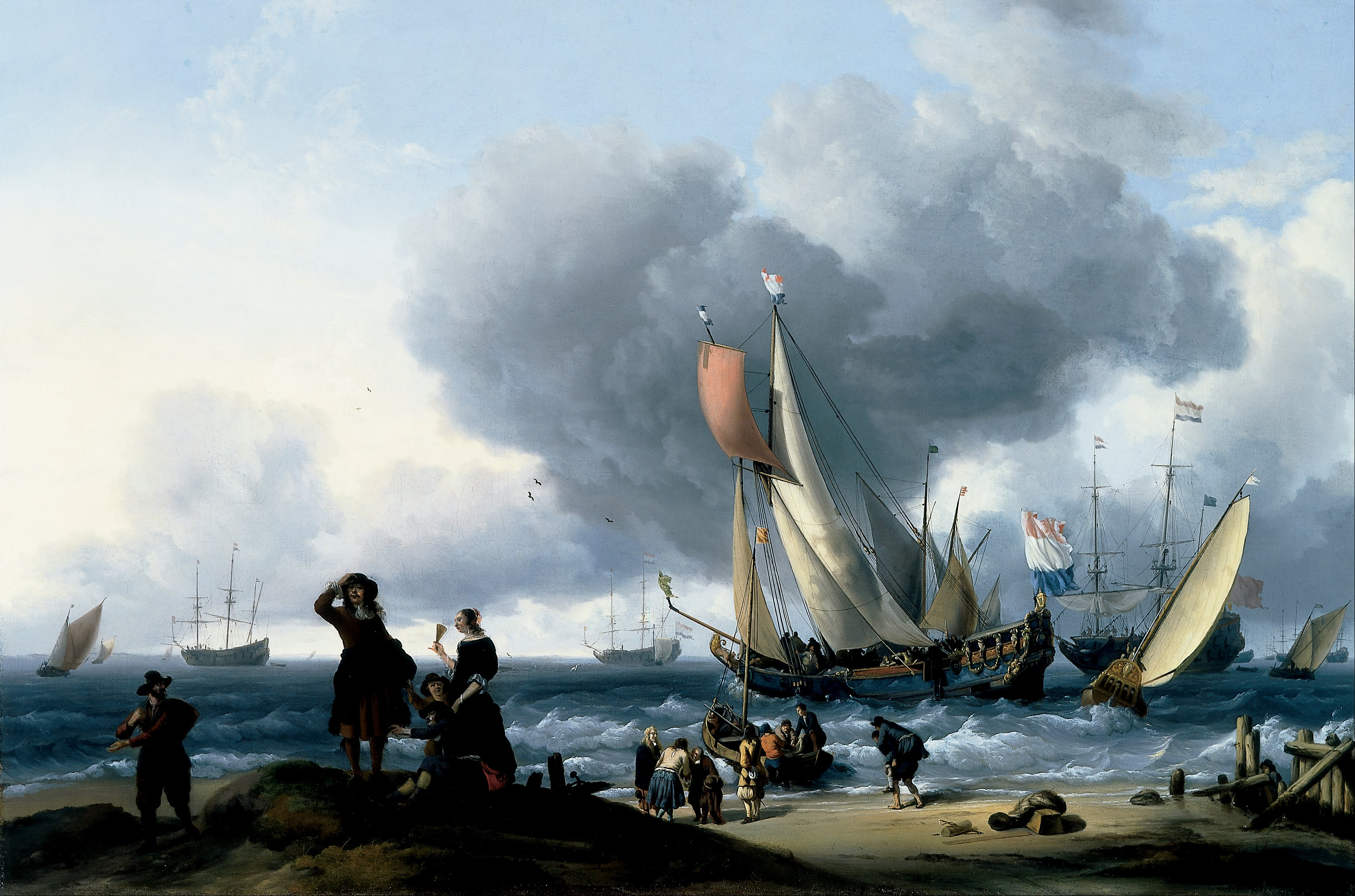
Dutchman Embarking onto a Yacht, 1670-1679

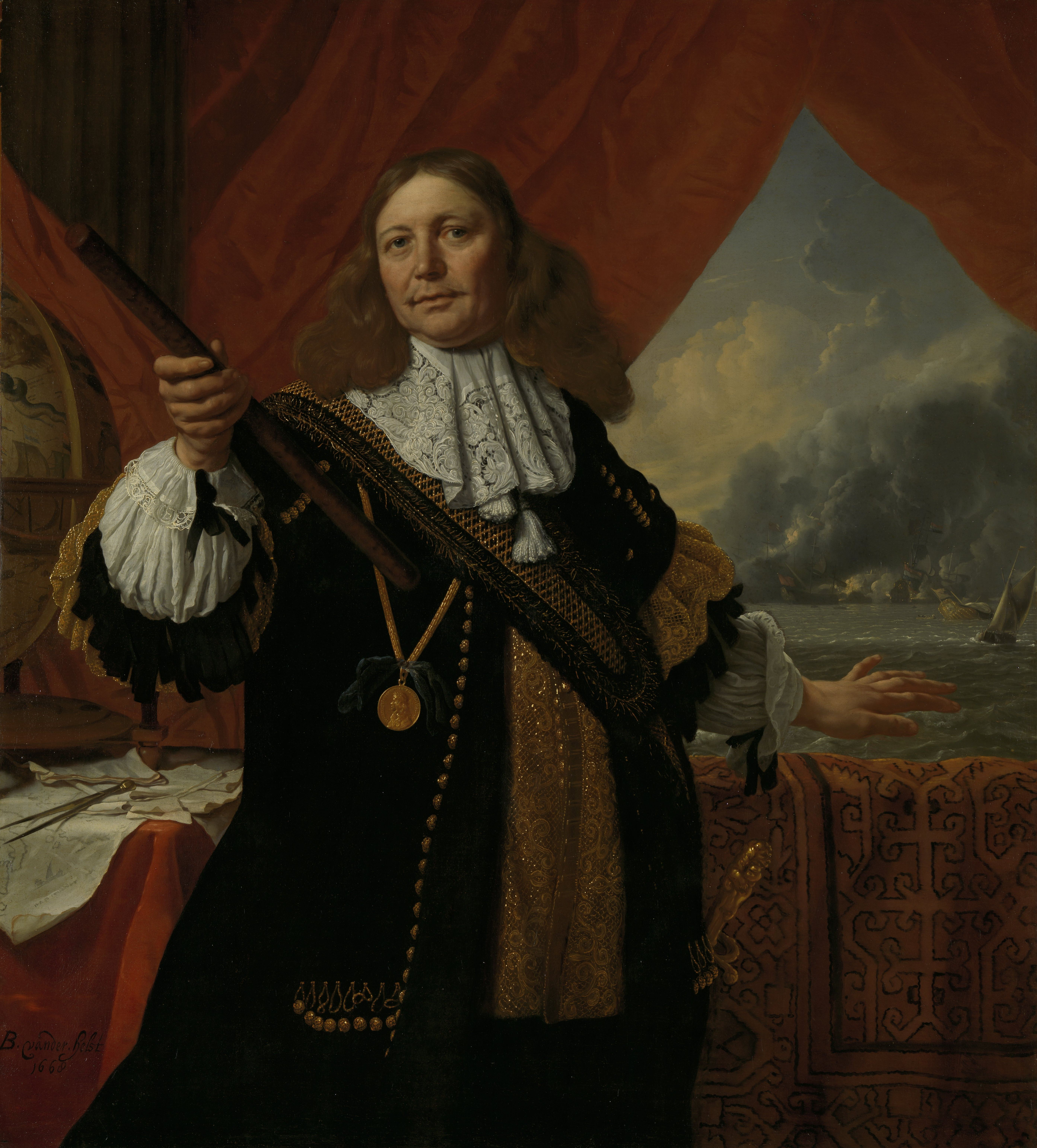
Johan de Liefde, Vice-Admiral

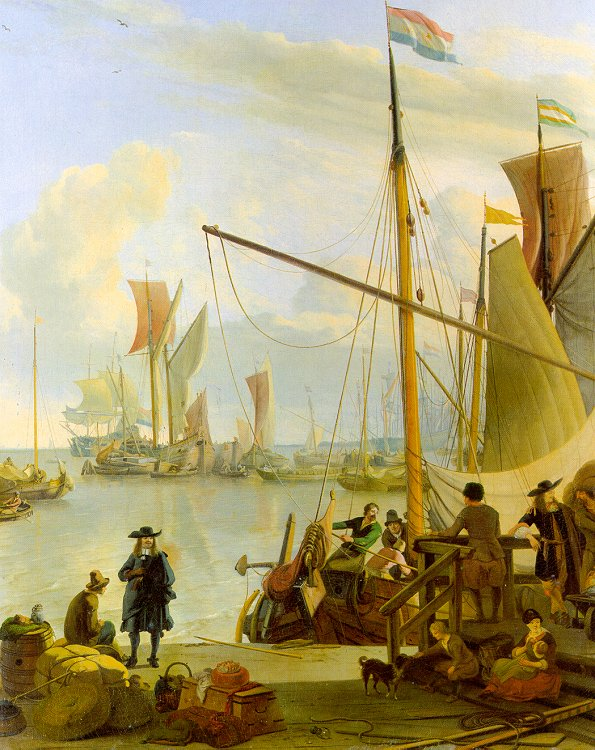
The Y at Amsterdam viewed from Mussel Pier
