= Simon de Vlieger =

Dutch painter

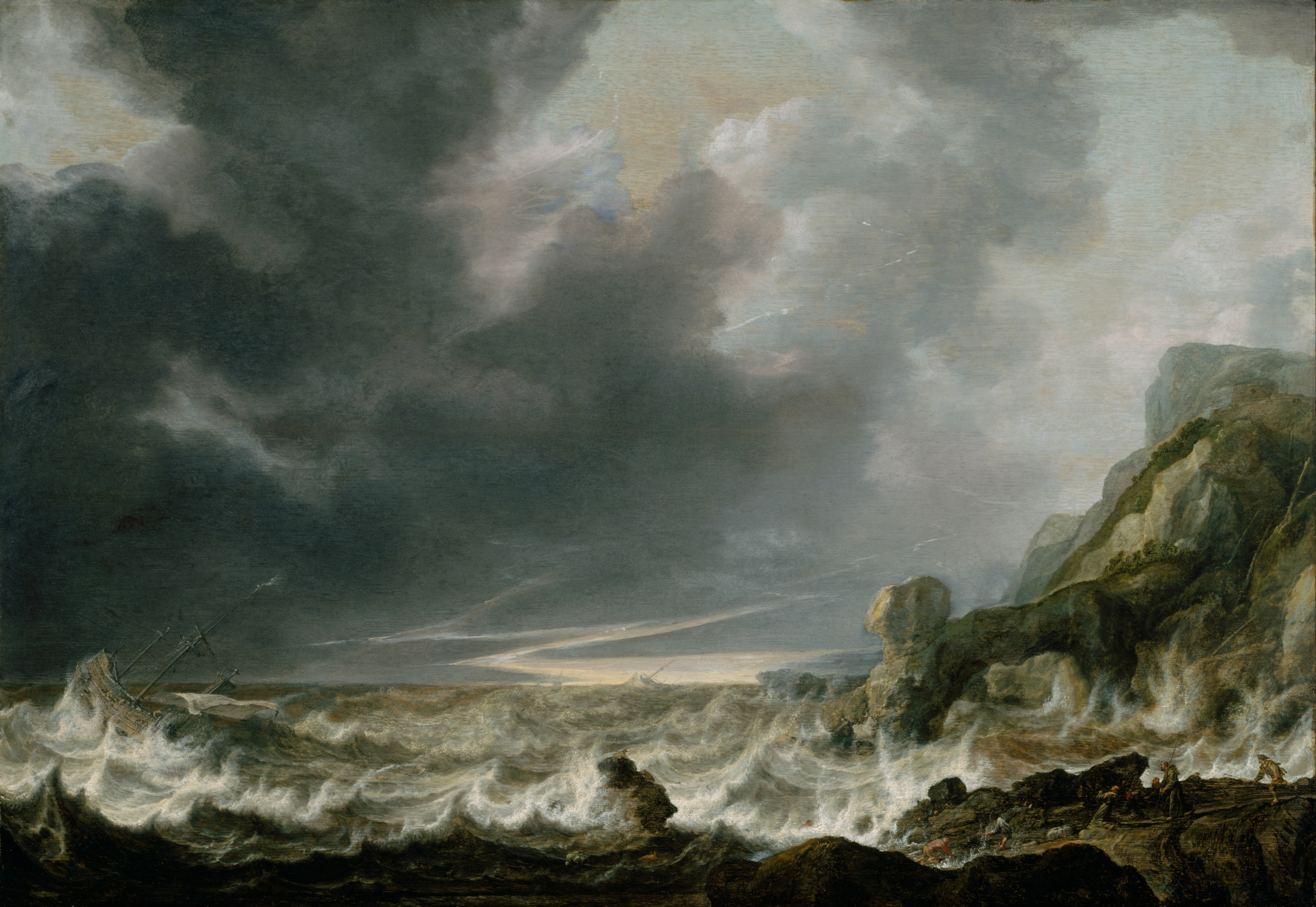
Ship in Distress off a Rocky Coast, 1645, Indianapolis Museum of Art

Simon de Vlieger (c. 1601 – buried 13 March 1653) was a Dutch painter, draughtsman and designer of tapestries, etchings, stained glass windows. While he is mainly known for his marine paintings, he also painted beach scenes, landscapes and genre scenes.

== Life ==
He was likely born in Rotterdam as the son of Jacob Pietersz van Zwet Bolleweck (died ca. 1634) and Lysbeth Wouters. His sister Neeltje de Vlieger also became a painter, specializing in still lifes. It is not known with whom Simon De Vlieger trained. (He and his sister both adopted 'De Vlieger' (The Flyer) as a professional or artist's surname. It was common in this period for artists and writers to do so, to try to stand out in competitive fields.)

He married in Rotterdam on 10 January 1627 to Anna Gerrits van Willige (died 1647). The couple had a daughter Cornelia, who later married the painter Paulus van Hillegaert II. De Vlieger and his young family moved in 1634 to Delft, where he is recorded renting the house 'De Kranenburch' from 1 May 1634 for the duration of a year. A year later he moved to the house called 'De Houttuyn'. He joined the Guild of Saint Luke of Delft.

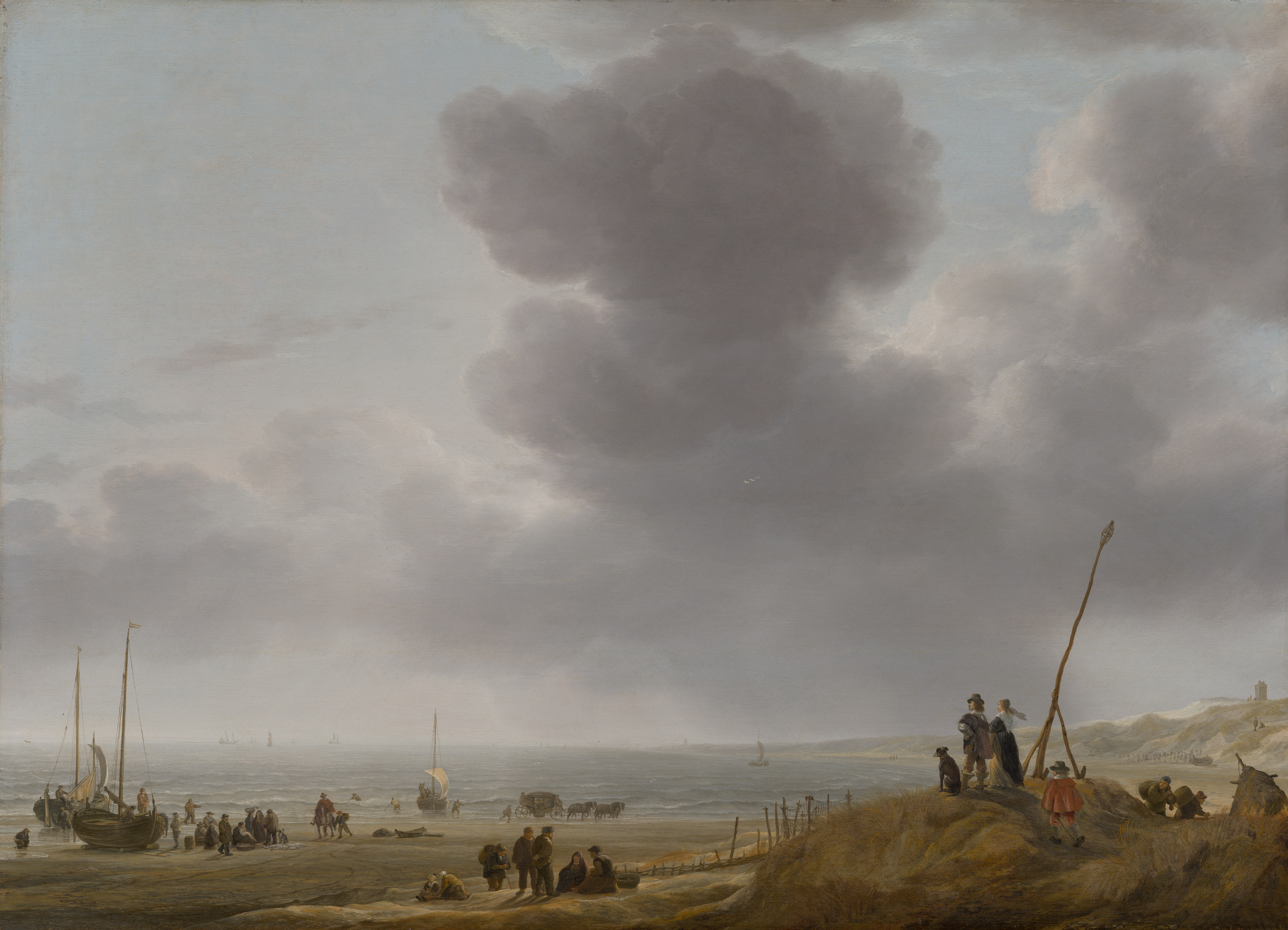
Beach view

In 1638 he moved to Amsterdam for a major project. Here he worked until 1642 on a commission to paint decorations for the reception of the French Queen Maria de' Medici. Around 1640, he was temporarily in Arnhem, shown by his drawing of the Rijnpoort. He also spent time in the period 1642 to 1643 in Kleef, where he made a drawing of the Rhine River. He was active in Rotterdam intermittently from 1642 to 1644, where he worked on the organ shutters of St Laurens church. Throughout this period, he maintained a residence in Amsterdam, where he became a citizen of the city on 5 January 1643. Several years later, in 1650, he moved to Weesp, a small town on the outskirts of Amsterdam. There he died in 1653.

Willem van de Velde the younger was a noted pupil of his.

== Work ==
While mainly known for his marine paintings, de Vlieger also painted beach scenes, landscapes, and genre scenes. In addition to painting, he designed tapestries, etchings, stained glass windows for the Nieuwe Kerk in Amsterdam, and the organ shutters for the St. Laurenskerk in Rotterdam. De Vlieger signed his work with the letters "S.D.VL.F.", "Simon de Vlieger fecit".

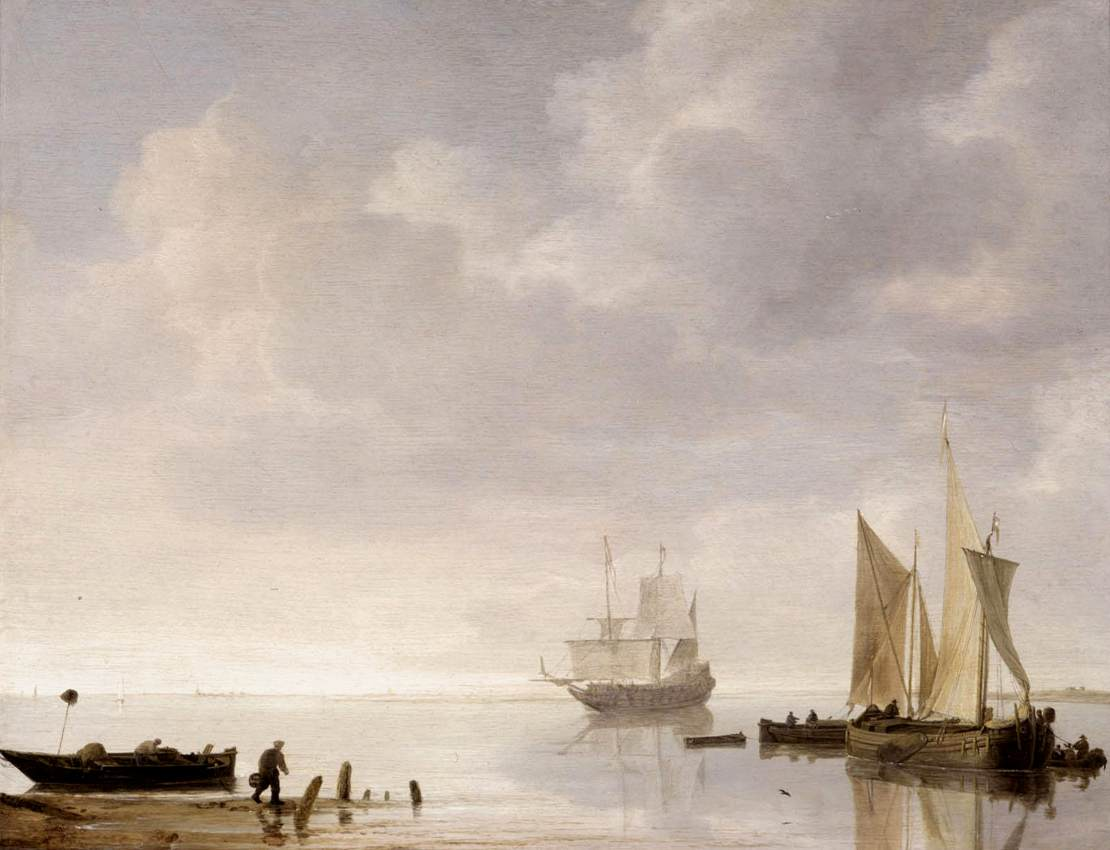
Coastal Scene

The earliest known works of De Vlieger date from 1624. These marine pieces were still strongly influenced by the work of Jan Porcellis and Willem van de Velde the Elder and show several ships and rocky coasts. By the 1630s and 1640s, he was one of the best-known Dutch maritime painters. He moved away from the monochrome style of Jan Porcellis and Willem van de Velde the elder towards a more realistic use of colour, with highly detailed and accurate representations of rigging and ship construction. He painted ships in harbour and at sea, as well as storms and shipwrecks.

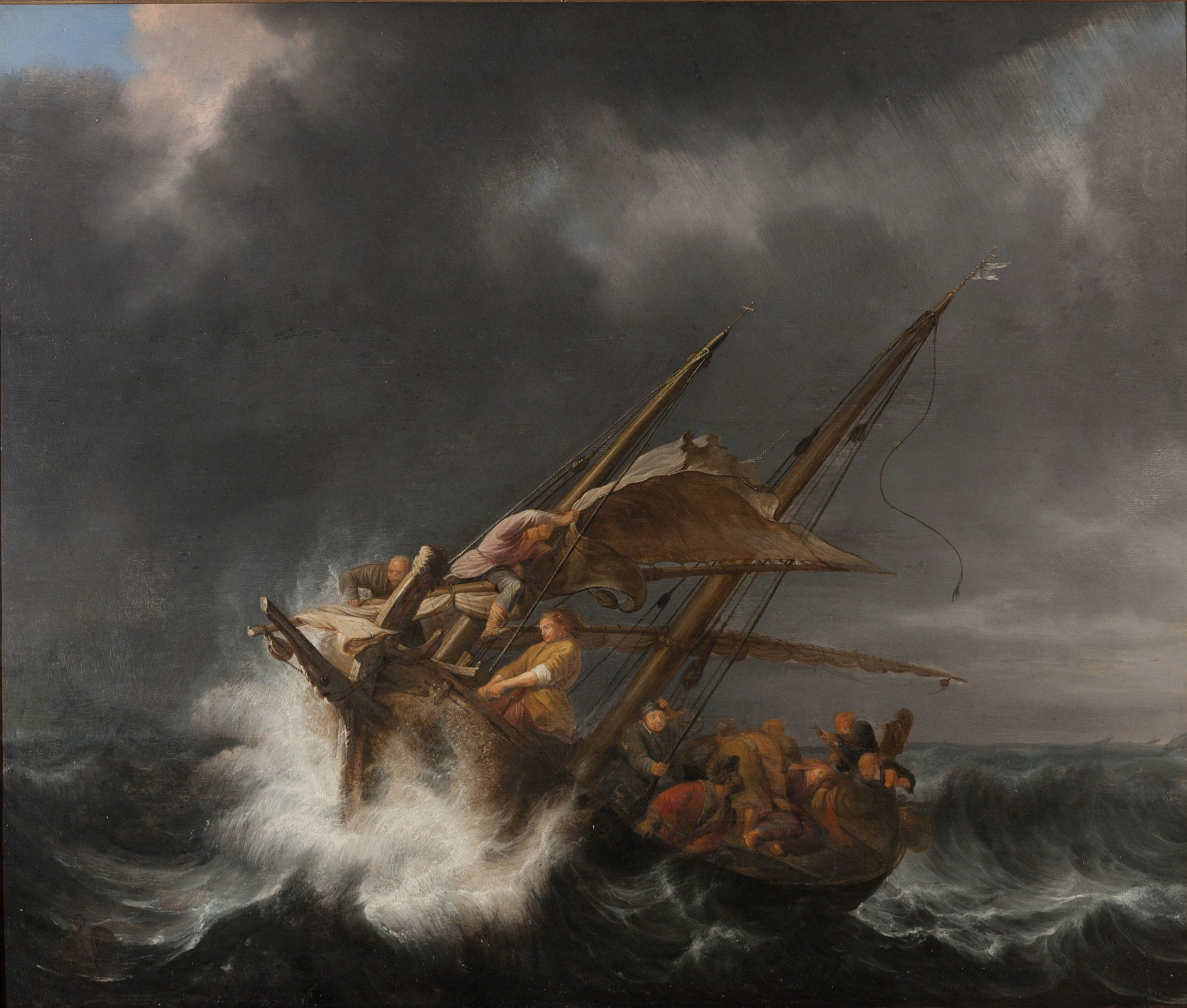
Calming the storm

During his residence in Delft, de Vlieger created a number of marine paintings showing the sea washing against a rocky shore. An example of a work from this period is the Calming the storm (1637, Art Collection of the University Göttingen). The close-up treatment of this subject and the overall composition go back to the print made by Adriaen Collaert after a design by the Flemish artist Maerten de Vos. That print depicting The storm on the sea of Galilei was plate 8 in the 12-part Vita, passio et Resvrrectio Iesv Christ, which was published by Jan and Raphael Sadeler in Antwerp in 1583. As in the print, de Vlieger depicts the boat in a forward tilting position, but he distances himself by integrating the story into the seascape rather than solely focusing on the activities on the boat.

De Vlieger specialised in the detailed depiction of ships and was able to realistically depict the colours on the seawater. He depicted entire fleets and naval battles. In sketches he demonstrated his insight into linear perspective.

Around 1630 de Vlieger produced his first beach scene, a landscape type that he painted frequently over the following two decades. From 1650 until his death, he mainly painted and drew sea coasts and forests.

His work was highly influential on the younger generation of maritime painters. His work was copied by other artists, such as Jan van Ossenbeeck. (ca. 1624-1674). Aelbert Cuyp was familiar with his work and he is said to have copied the characteristic Dutch skies with clouds and rays of sun falling from de Vlieger.
