= Handboogdoelen, Amsterdam =

Building in Amsterdam, the Netherlands

Coordinates: 52°22′4″N 4°53′22″E

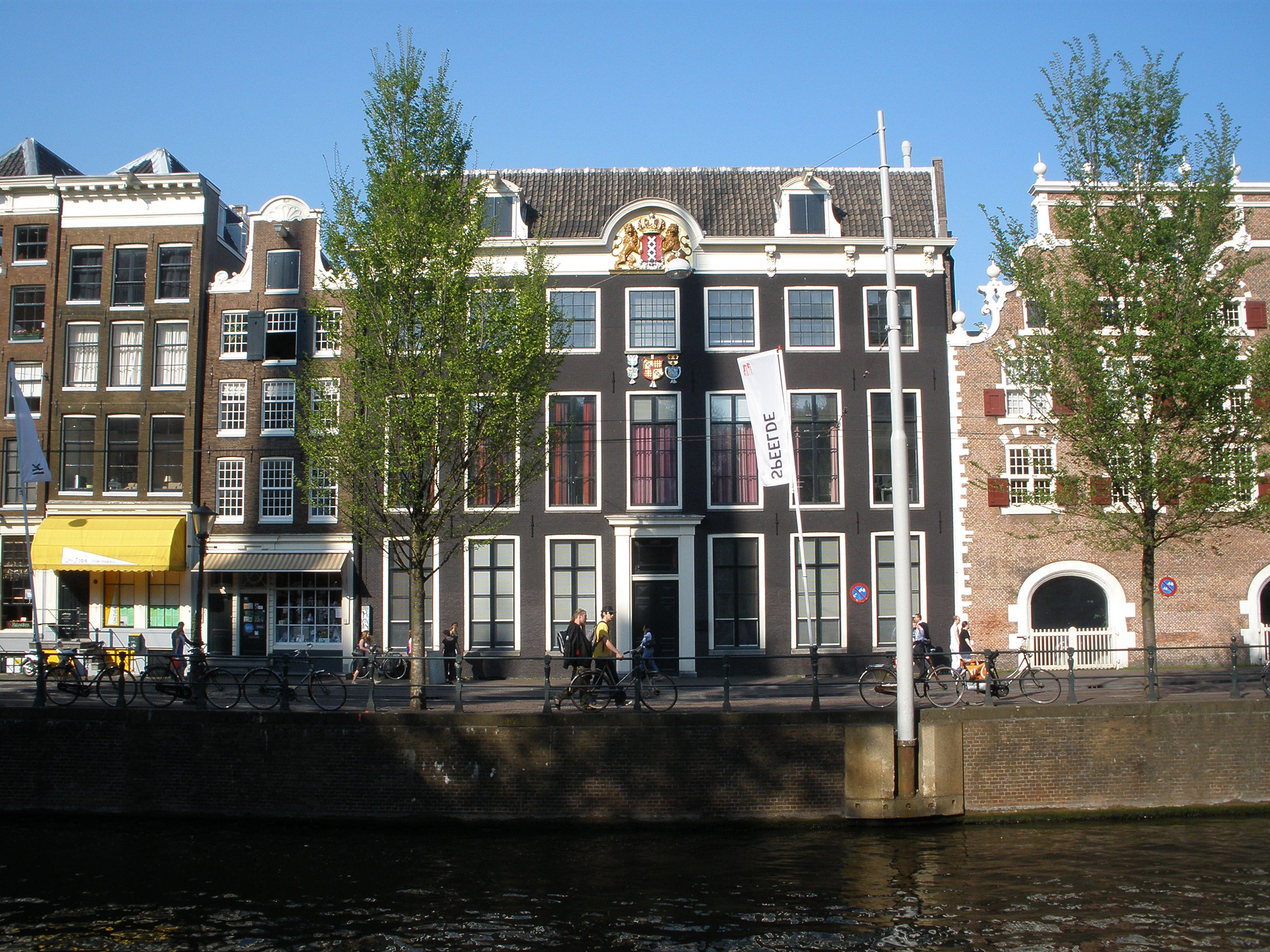
The Handboogdoelen in 2008, seen from across the Singel canal

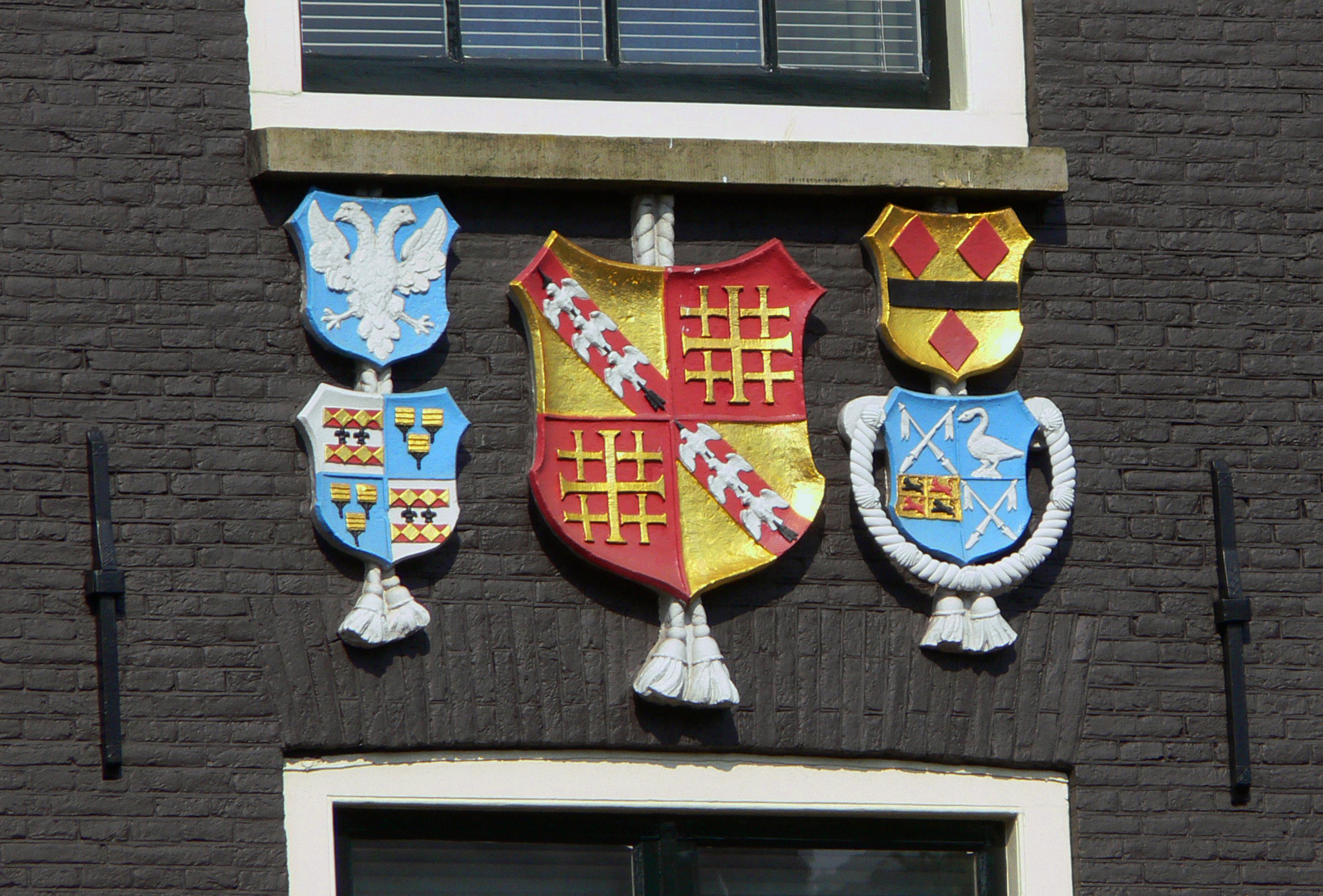
Detail of the front facade showing the coats of arms of the civic guard and those of four overlieden (directors) of the civic guard, including Frans Banning Cocq

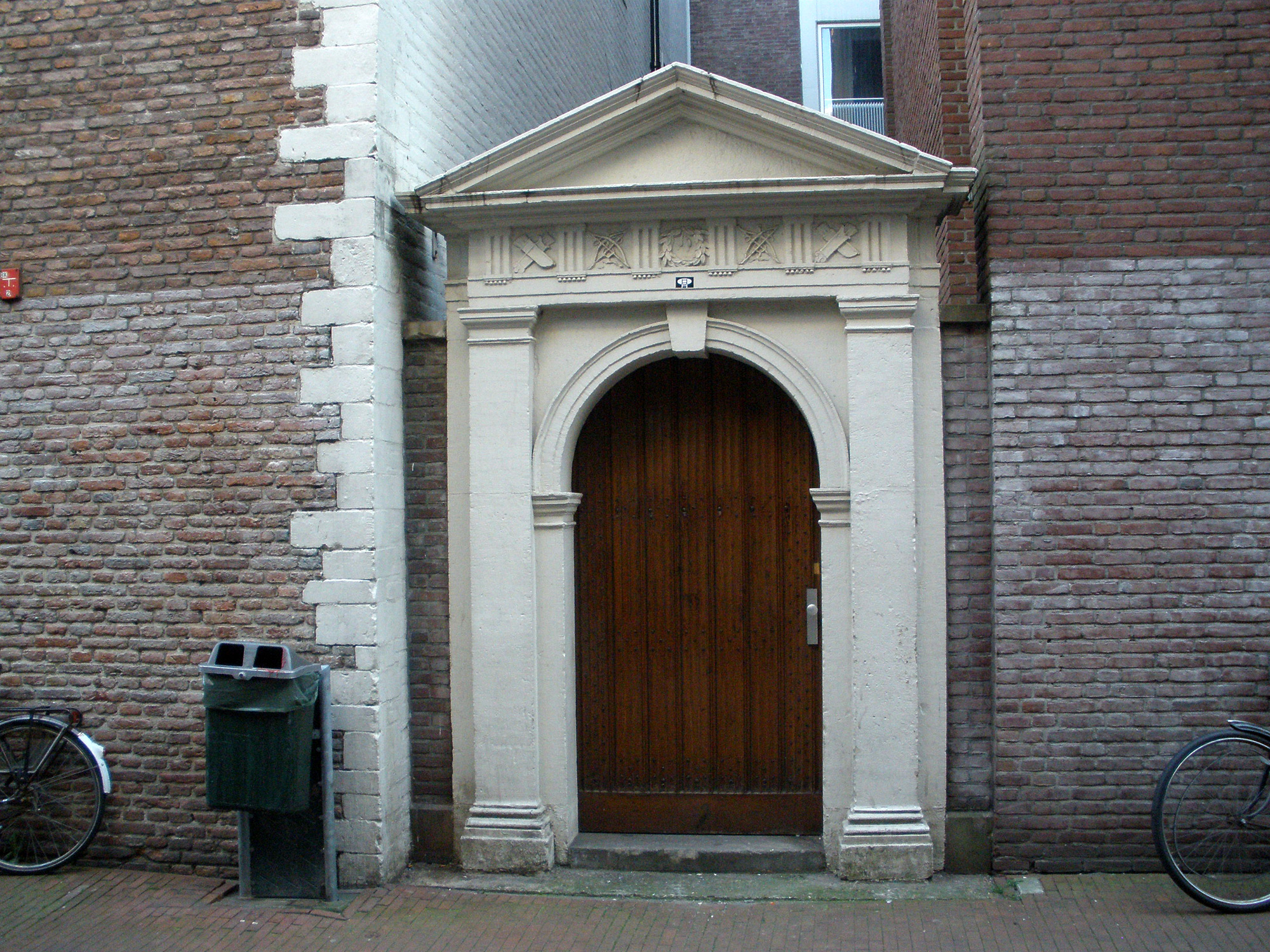
The gate at the back of the Handboogdoelen, on Handboogstraat

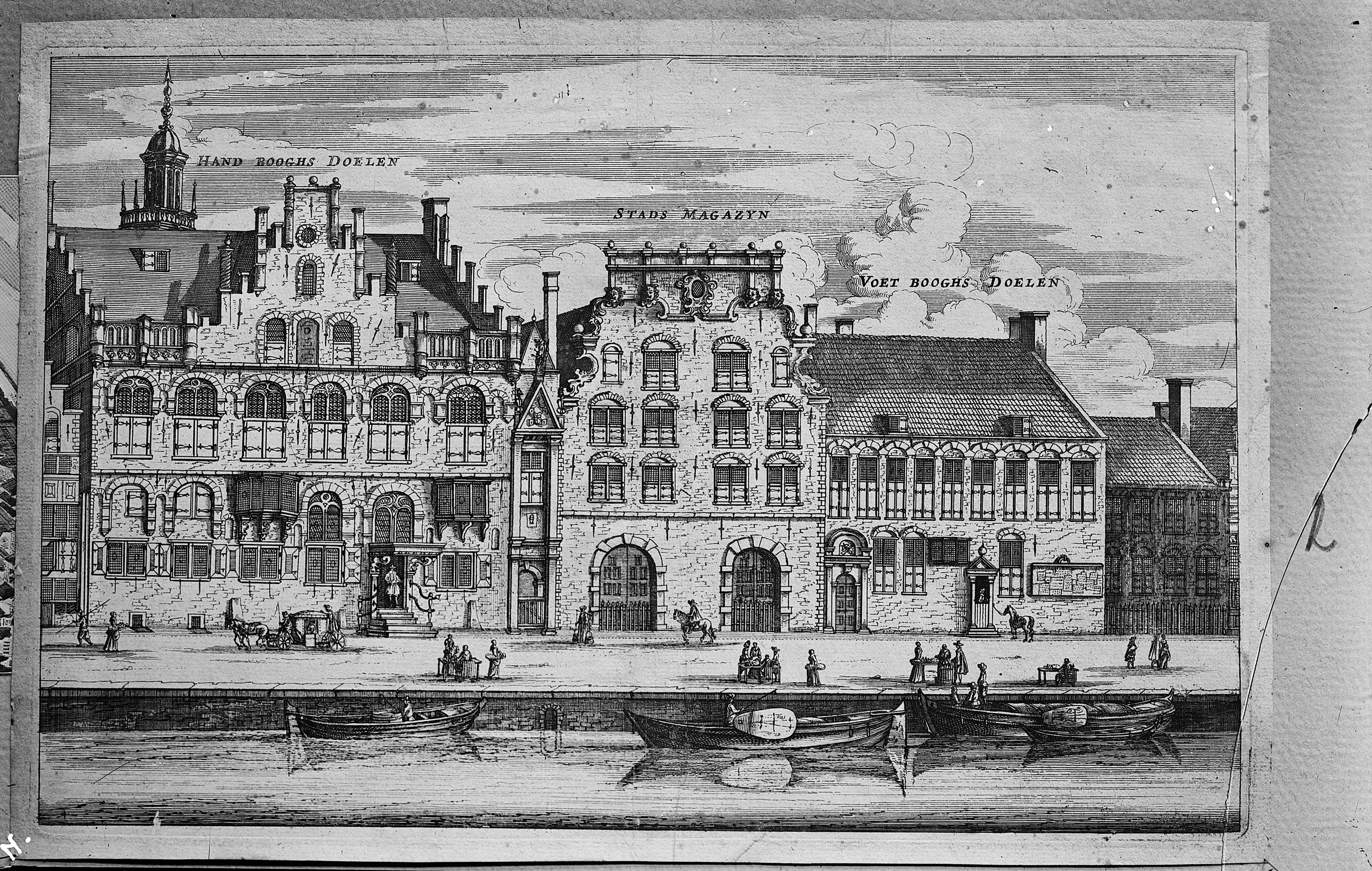
17th-century depiction of Singel canal showing (left to right) the Handboogdoelen, Bushuis and Voetboogdoelen

The Handboogdoelen ("longbowmen's shooting range") is a building on the Singel canal in Amsterdam, near Koningsplein square. It dates back to the early 16th century and originally served as headquarters and shooting range of the local schutterij (civic guard). Most of the current building at Singel 421 dates to the 18th century and is part of the main complex of the Amsterdam University Library. The Doelenzaal hall on the ground floor of the building (not to be confused with the Doelenzaal on Kloveniersburgwal canal) is used for lectures, meetings, receptions and doctoral dissertations. The building has rijksmonument status.

== History ==
=== Shooting range ===
The Handboogdoelen, also known as the Garnalendoelen, Grote Doelen or St. Sebastiaansdoelen (after the patron saint of archers, Saint Sebastian) was one of three doelens (shooting ranges) for the Amsterdam schutterij (civic guard). The other two shooting ranges were the Voetboogdoelen and Kloveniersdoelen, located along the Singel and Kloveniersburgwal canals respectively. The Handboogdoelen civic guard was armed with longbows, while the Voetboogdoelen civic guard wielded crossbows and the Kloveniersdoelen civic guard used an early type of musket, the arquebus. The headquarters of the Handboogdoelen was the largest and grandest of the three.

The Handboogdoelen was established shortly before 1500 as the shooting range for the handboogschutterij (longbowmen's civic guard), and the associated building was completed around 1512. Like the adjacent Voetboogdoelen (established in 1458), the shooting range extended from the Singel canal to the back side of the houses on Kalverstraat.

Amsterdam's militia guilds were formed in the Middle Ages to defend the city against attack. Around 1580, at the behest of William of Orange, these Medieval guilds were incorporated into a new, much larger civic guard to defend the newly Protestant city against the Spanish during the Dutch revolt which ultimately led to a full-blown war of independence, the Eighty Years' War. Officers of this new civic guard were recruited from the well-to-do of Amsterdam.

The Handboogdoelen was used by the civic guard from about 1509. In 1533, two bay windows were added to the building, the first known examples of bay windows in Amsterdam. The shooting range lay behind the building, stretching north towards the Kalverstraat. A small gate provided access to the shooting range. This gate, dating to about 1650, is still in existence and is now located on Handboogstraat, a small street running behind the building. The gate features Doric columns and depicts bows and arrows and quivers.

In the mid-17th century, the Eighty Years' War ended and the civic guard no longer served a military purpose. The civic guard continued to exist, but membership became an honorary position and the doelens assumed a primarily social function. The wealthiest and most powerful citizens of Dutch Golden Age Amsterdam came together in the doelens to eat, drink and smoke. In 1650 the city gave permission for houses to be built on the former shooting ranges of the Hand- and Voetboogdoelen. For these houses, two new streets were constructed: the Handboogstraat and Voetboogstraat.

=== Inn and hotel ===
In the 17th century, the building was also in use as lodgings for prominent visitors to Amsterdam. Its role as shooting range and headquarters of the civic guard ended in 1672, when the building was rented out to an innkeeper. In the late 17th century, the inn was expanded with additional rooms and halls by adding another floor to the building and connecting it to the adjacent house. A new facade was added to the building in 1733, depicting the coat of arms of the city of Amsterdam at the top, as well as five smaller coats of arms between the windows below: the coat of arms of the civic guard and those of four overlieden (directors) of the civic guard, including Frans Banning Cocq, who features as the central figure in Rembrandt's The Night Watch.

The building served as a meeting place for the radical political faction of the Patriotten in the late 18th century. For instance, a large feast was held in the banqueting hall in 1786 to celebrate a Dutch alliance with France. In the 19th century, the inn transformed into a well-respected hotel, known as Hotel de Garnalen Doelen.

=== University library ===
In 1860, the city of Amsterdam offered the building to the Athenaeum Illustre, the predecessor of the University of Amsterdam. The city library, predecessor of the Amsterdam University Library, moved there around 1881 from the Agnietenkapel, as this chapel had become to small and derelict to house the library. The Handboogdoelen remains part of the main university library complex to this day. In the 20th century, the adjacent buildings were added to the library complex.

Physicist Johannes Diderik van der Waals established his first laboratory in the building. He remained there until about 1883, when his laboratory was moved to a new building on Plantage Muidergracht canal.

A 1968 restoration uncovered the original 16th-century building, revealing that it may contain the city's oldest remaining masonry work and the only remaining late-Medieval mantelpiece.

== Painting ==
Members of the civic guard, drawn from the well-to-do of Amsterdam, frequently commissioned group portraits of themselves, which were hung in the doelens. For instance, Jan Tengnagel in 1613 painted a rot (section) of 17 members of the handboogschutterij (longbowmens' civic guard) under the command of Geurt van Beuningen. This painting is now in the Rijksmuseum. Around 1653, Bartholomeus van der Helst portraited the overlieden (directors) of the longbowmens' civic guard. This painting is now in the Louvre in Paris.

Jan Weenix painted a wall covering for the Handboogdoelen depicting a hunting scene. The painting is now on display in the Mauritshuis museum in The Hague. Rembrandt sketched the front facade of the Handboogdoelen.

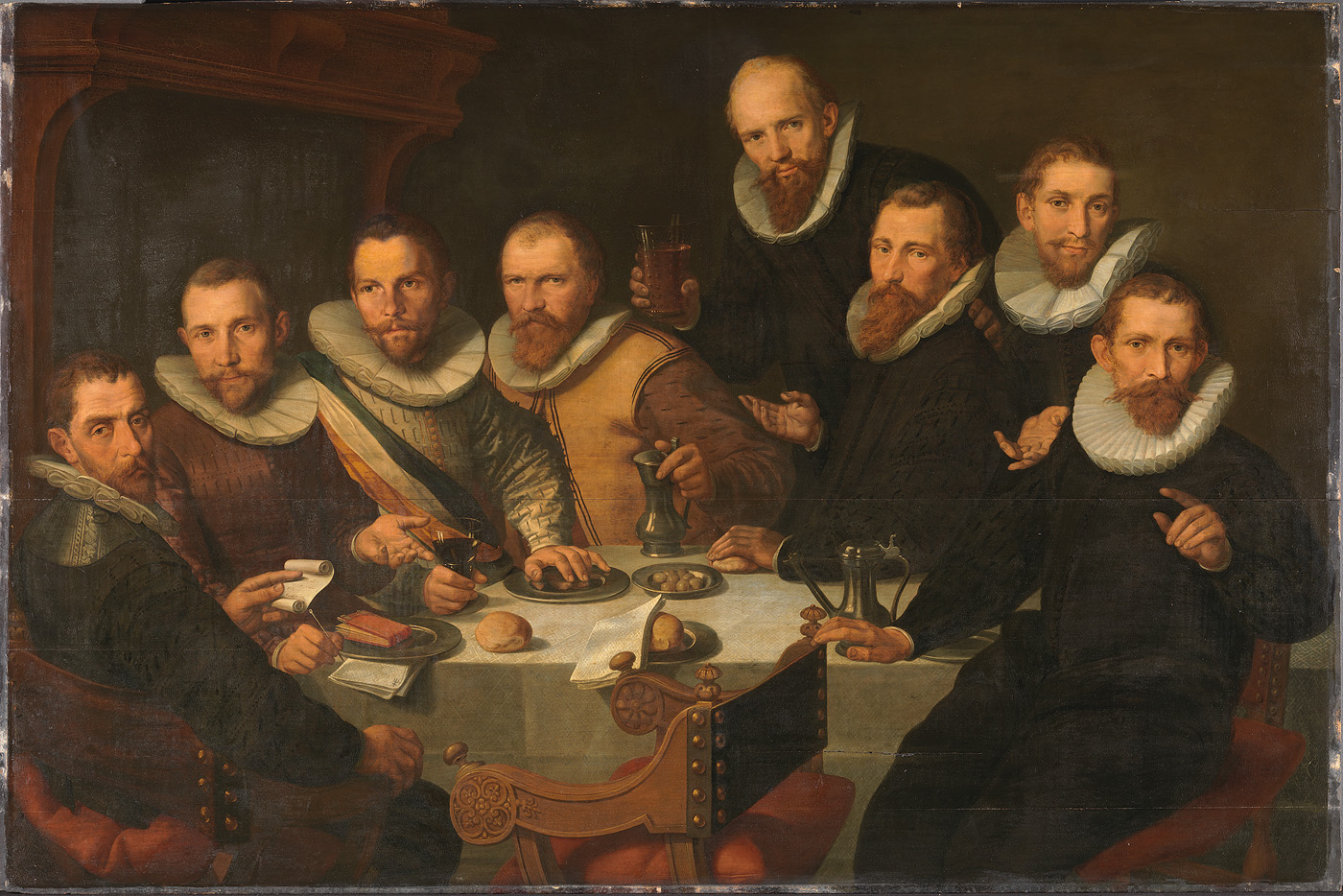
Painting by Aert Pietersz. (1604) showing civic guardsmen of the company of Captain Pieter van Neck

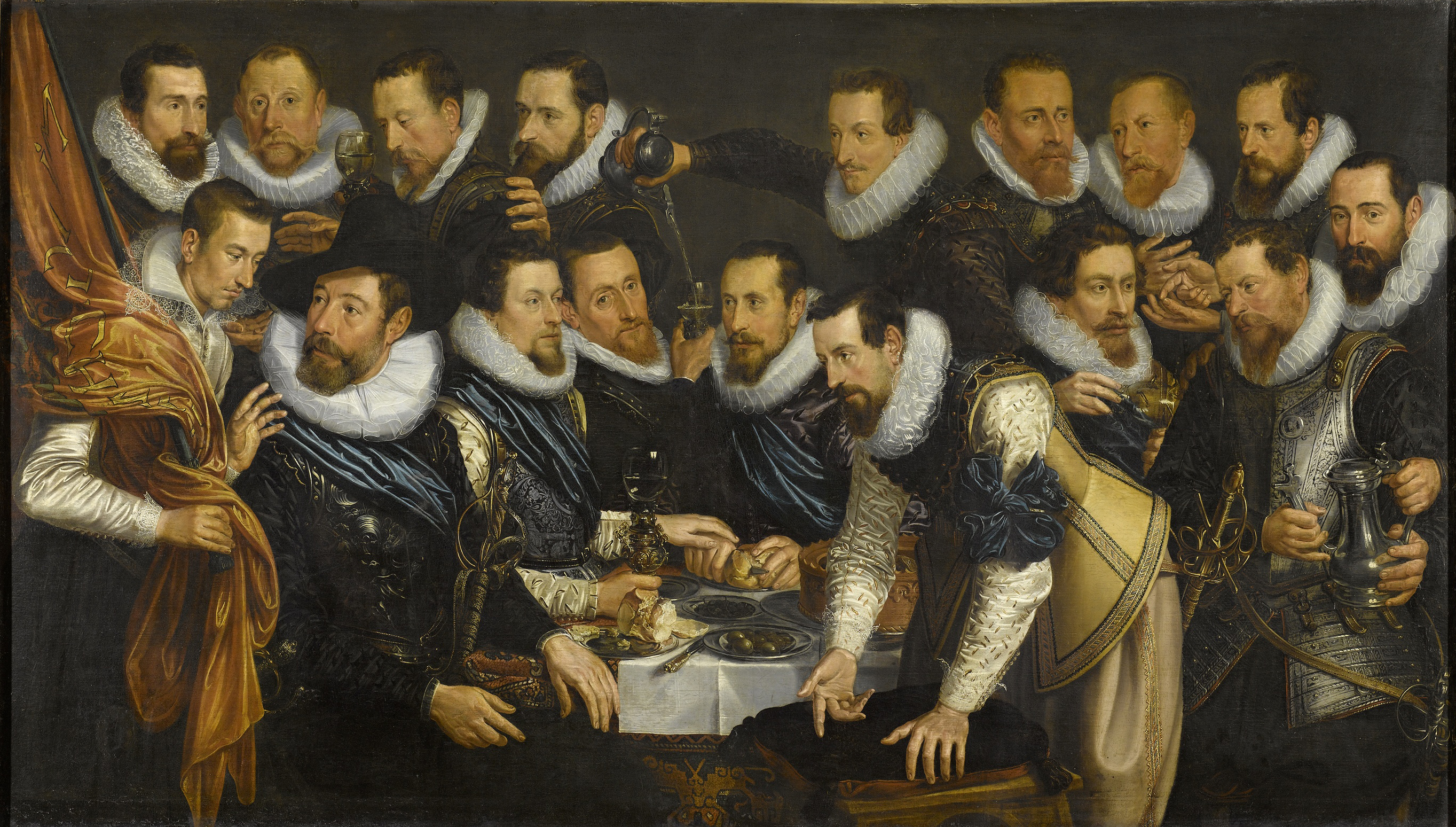
Painting by Jan Tengnagel (1613) of a section of the civic guard under the command of Geurt van Beuningen

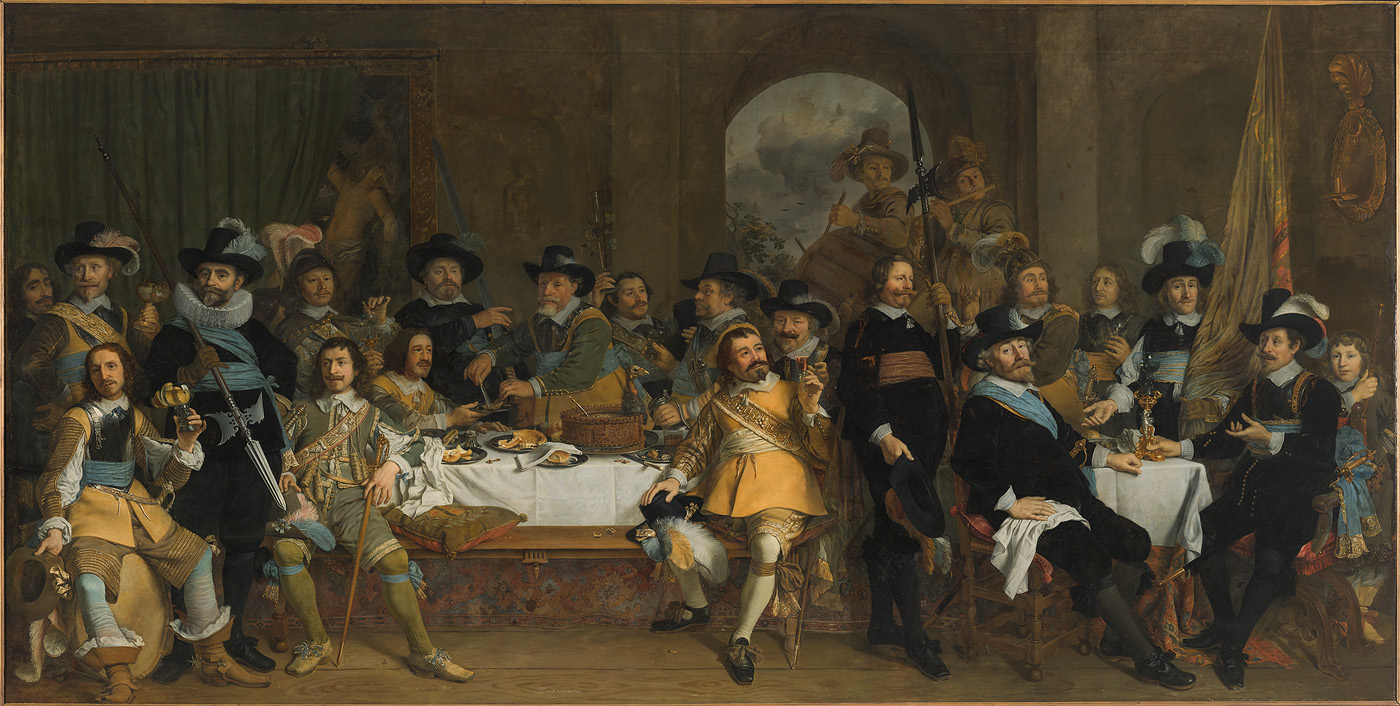
Painting by Johannes Spilberg (1650) showing a banquet in the Voetboogdoelen with a section of the civic guard commanded by Jan and Gijsbert van de Poll

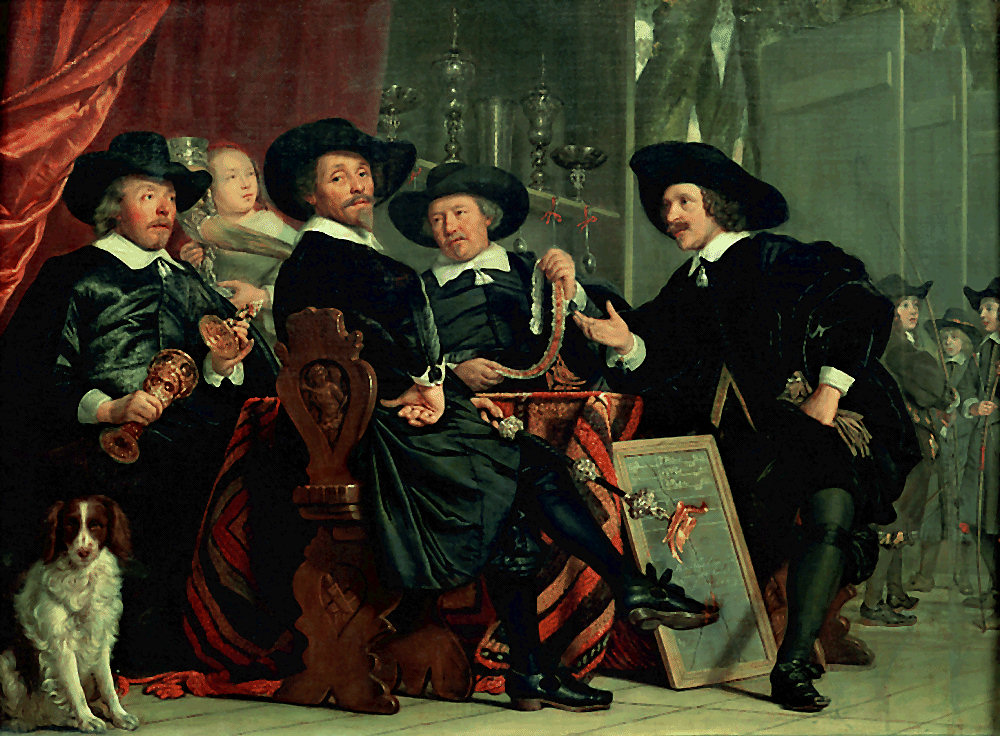
Painting by Bartholomeus van der Helst (1653) showing Frans Banning Cocq, Joan Blaeu and two other directors of the civic guard of longbowmen

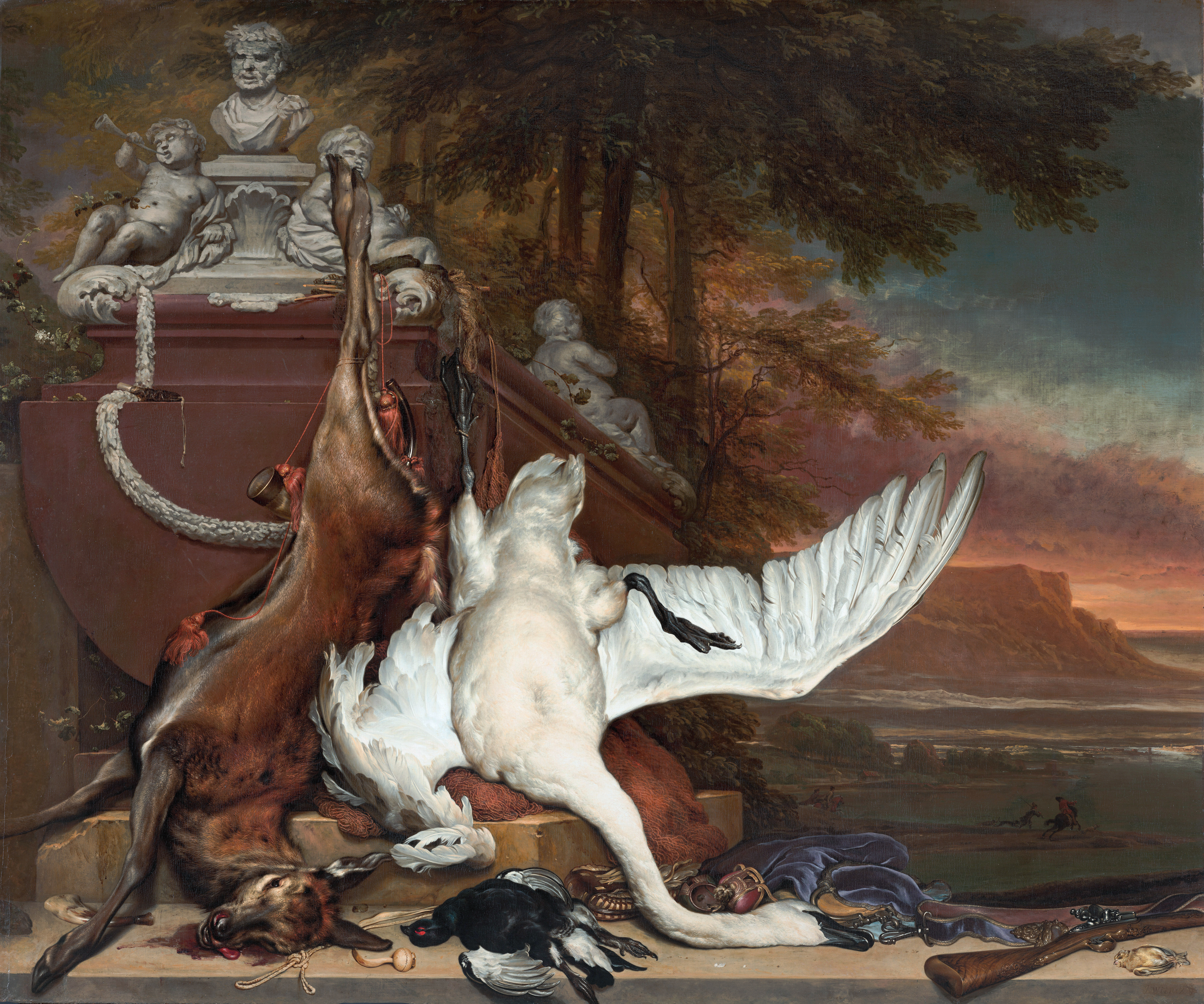
Wall covering painted by Jan Weenix (c. 1700)

== Related buildings ==
The Handboogdoelen was one of three doelens (shooting ranges) for the Amsterdam civic guard, alongside the Voetboogdoelen and Kloveniersdoelen, which were located along Heiligeweg and Kloveniersburgwal canal respectively.

The Dutch towns of Middelburg and Goes also had a Handboogdoelen for their civic guards of longbowmen.

== Sources ==
- "De Doelenzaal", University of Amsterdam (Dutch, archived)
- "Van Stadsboekerij tot 'mega'bibliotheek?", Vrienden van de Amsterdamse Binnenstad (Dutch, archived)
