= Voetboogdoelen, Amsterdam =

Former building in Amsterdam, Netherlands

Coordinates: 52°22′4″N 4°53′22″E

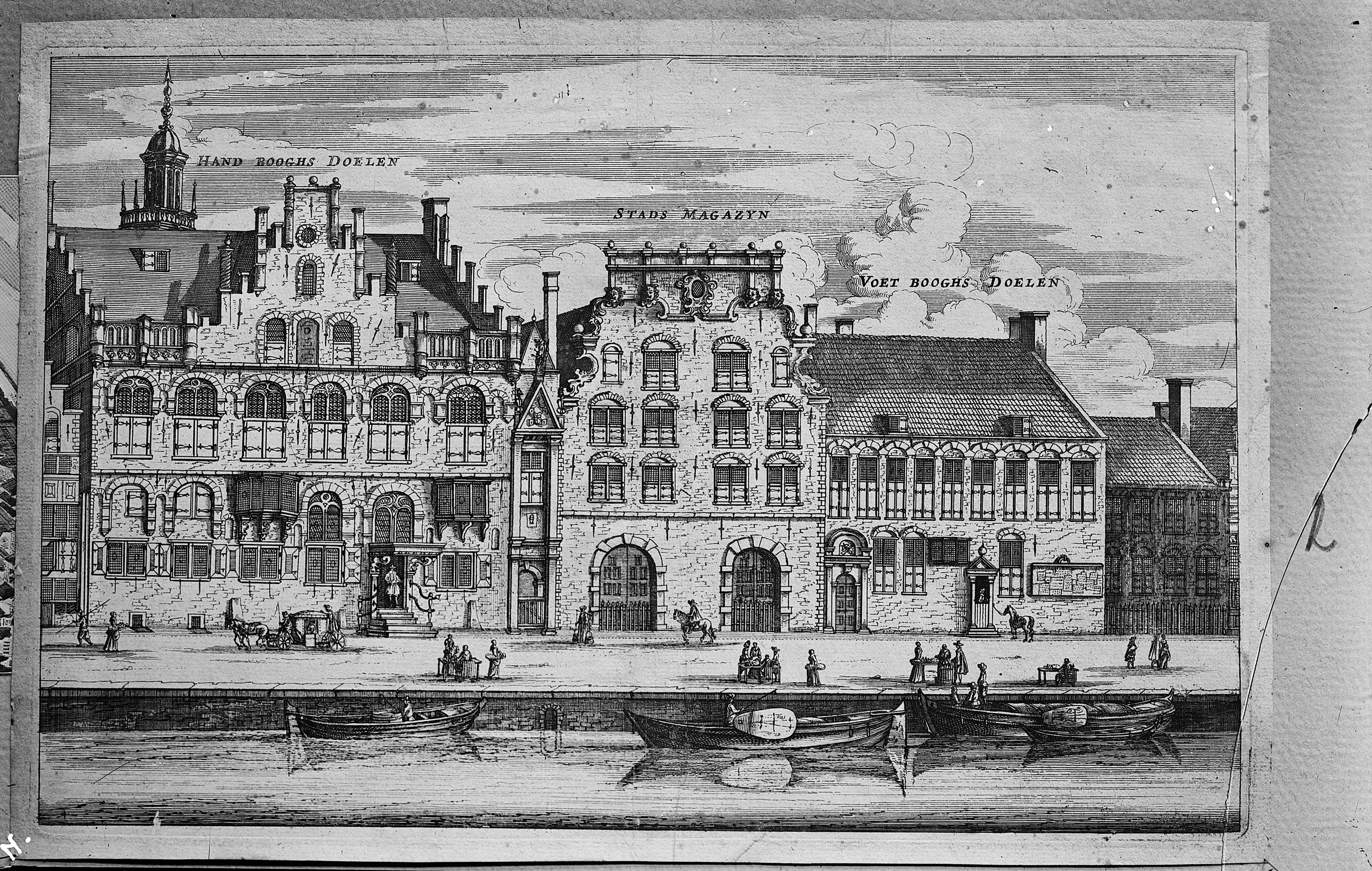
17th-century depiction of the Singel canal showing (from left to right) the Handboogdoelen, Bushuis and Voetboogdoelen

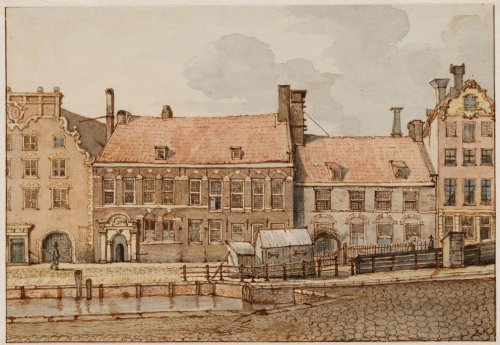
Drawing of the Voetboogdoelen by Gerrit Lamberts, early 19th century

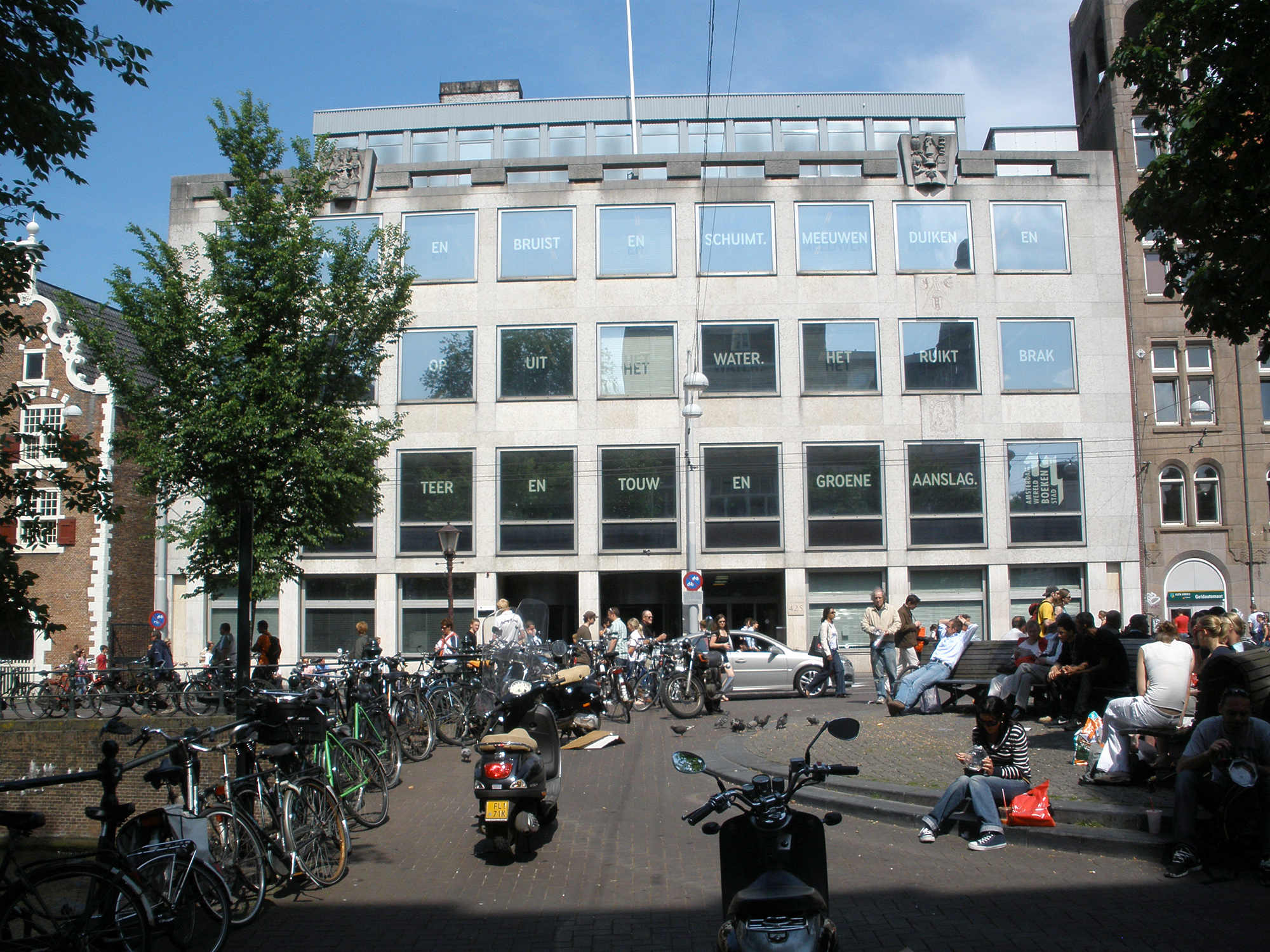
The former location of the Voetboogdoelen is now occupied by the main building of the Amsterdam University Library

The Voetboogdoelen ("crossbowmen's shooting range") was a 16th-century building on the Singel canal in Amsterdam, at the corner of Heiligeweg near Koningsplein square, which served as headquarters and shooting range of the local schutterij (civic guard). Frans Hals painted a group portrait for the Voetboogdoelen, known as the Meagre Company.

The spot where the Voetboogdoelen once stood is now occupied by the main building of the Amsterdam University Library. The nearby street Voetboogstraat was named in reference to the Voetboogdoelen.

== History ==
The Voetboogdoelen, also called Sint-Jorisdoelen after its patron saint, Saint George, was one of three doelens (shooting ranges) for the Amsterdam schutterij (civic guard). The other two shooting ranges were the Handboogdoelen and Kloveniersdoelen, located along the Singel and Kloveniersburgwal canals respectively. The Voetboogdoelen civic guard was armed with crossbows, while the Handboogdoelen civic guard wielded longbows and the Kloveniersdoelen civic guard used an early type of musket, the arquebus.

The Voetboogdoelen was established in 1458 as the shooting range for the voetboogschutterij (crossbowmen's civic guard), and the associated building was completed in the early 16th century. The shooting range extended from the Singel canal to the back side of the houses on Kalverstraat and Heiligeweg.

Amsterdam's militia guilds were formed in the Middle Ages to defend the city against attack. Around 1580, at the behest of William of Orange, these Medieval guilds were incorporated into a new, much larger civic guard to defend the newly Protestant city against the Spanish during the Dutch revolt which ultimately led to a full-blown war of independence, the Eighty Years' War. Officers of this new civic guard were recruited from the well-to-do of Amsterdam.

In the mid-17th century, the Eighty Years' War ended and the civic guard no longer served a military purpose. The civic guard continued to exist, but membership became an honorary position and the doelens assumed a primarily social function. The wealthiest and most powerful citizens of Dutch Golden Age Amsterdam came together in the doelens to eat, drink and smoke. In 1650 the city gave permission for houses to be built on the former shooting ranges of the Voet- and Handboogdoelen. For these houses, two new streets were constructed: the Voetboogstraat and Handboogstraat.

Banquets were held in the Voetboogdoelen in 1653 and 1654 to celebrate the founding of the Amsterdam artists' guild, the Guild of Saint Luke. At the first of these feasts, on 20 October 1653, Joost van den Vondel was crowned with a laurel wreath to celebrate his career as a poet.

From 1674, the Voetboogdoelen was rented out to the new Dutch West India Company — founded after the original company went bankrupt — to serve as its headquarters. From then on, the building was known as the West-Indisch Binnenhuis (Inner West India House) or simply West-Indisch Huis (West India House). The building was also used by the Society of Suriname from its founding in 1683 until the company was nationalized in 1795. During the French period, the Voetboogdoelen served as barracks. In 1816 the building was demolished to make way for the Roman Catholic St. Catherine's Church, consecrated in 1820. In 1939, the church was itself demolished.

This left the grounds unoccupied until the 1960s, when the main building of the Amsterdam University Library was built on the spot. The building, designed by architect Jan Leupen and others, has been named in the media as one of the ugliest of Amsterdam.

== Painting ==
Members of the civic guard, drawn from the well-to-do of Amsterdam, frequently commissioned group portraits of themselves, which were hung in the doelens. The earliest known example of these so-called schuttersstukken is a 1529 triptych by Dirck Jacobsz. for the Kloveniersdoelen, now in the Amsterdam Museum. Group portraits for the Voetboogdoelen were commissioned from as early as the 1530s.

Frans Hals was commissioned in 1633 to paint a group portrait for the Voetboogdoelen, The Meagre Company. However, Hals took years to complete it and, when the painting was still unfinished in 1636, Pieter Codde was contracted to complete it. Now on display in the Rijksmuseum, The Meagre Company is one of Hals' best-known works and was an important inspiration for Vincent van Gogh.

Two group portraits were commissioned for the Oude Sael (Old Hall) of the Voetboogdoelen to commemorate the end of the Eighty Years' War with the Peace of Münster in 1648. The best-known of these two paintings is the Banquet at the Crossbowmen’s Guild in Celebration of the Treaty of Münster by Bartholomeus van der Helst. This painting is now in the Rijksmuseum. The painting was probably trimmed; on copies (such as a 1779 print by Jacob Cats), the back wall and window are much higher, and some of the ceiling is even visible. In the painting, some of the buildings on the opposite side of the Singel canal can be seen through the window, including a building at Singel 460 designed and built by Philip Vingboons (nowadays the Odeon club and restaurant). The second group portrait commissioned for the Old Hall of the Voetboogdoelen was The company of Captain Joan Huydecoper by Govert Flinck. The painting is now in the Amsterdam Museum.

From about 1683, the group portraits were removed from the doelens, beginning with those in the former Voetboogdoelen. Most were hung in Amsterdam's city hall on Dam Square (now the Royal Palace of Amsterdam), others sold at auction. Many of these paintings, including Rembrandt's The Night Watch (which hung in the Kloveniersdoelen), were significantly trimmed to fit their new home. The full-size versions are known only through copies made of the original paintings, such as the watercolor copies contained in the Egerton Manuscript, which is now in the British Library. Cornelis Ketel's 1588 group painting of a company of the Voetboogdoelen civic guard, The Company of Captain Dirck Jacobsz Rosecrans and Lieutenant Pauw (now in the Rijksmuseum) was cropped on all sides, with as much as 1.27 meters thought to have been cut off on the right-hand side.

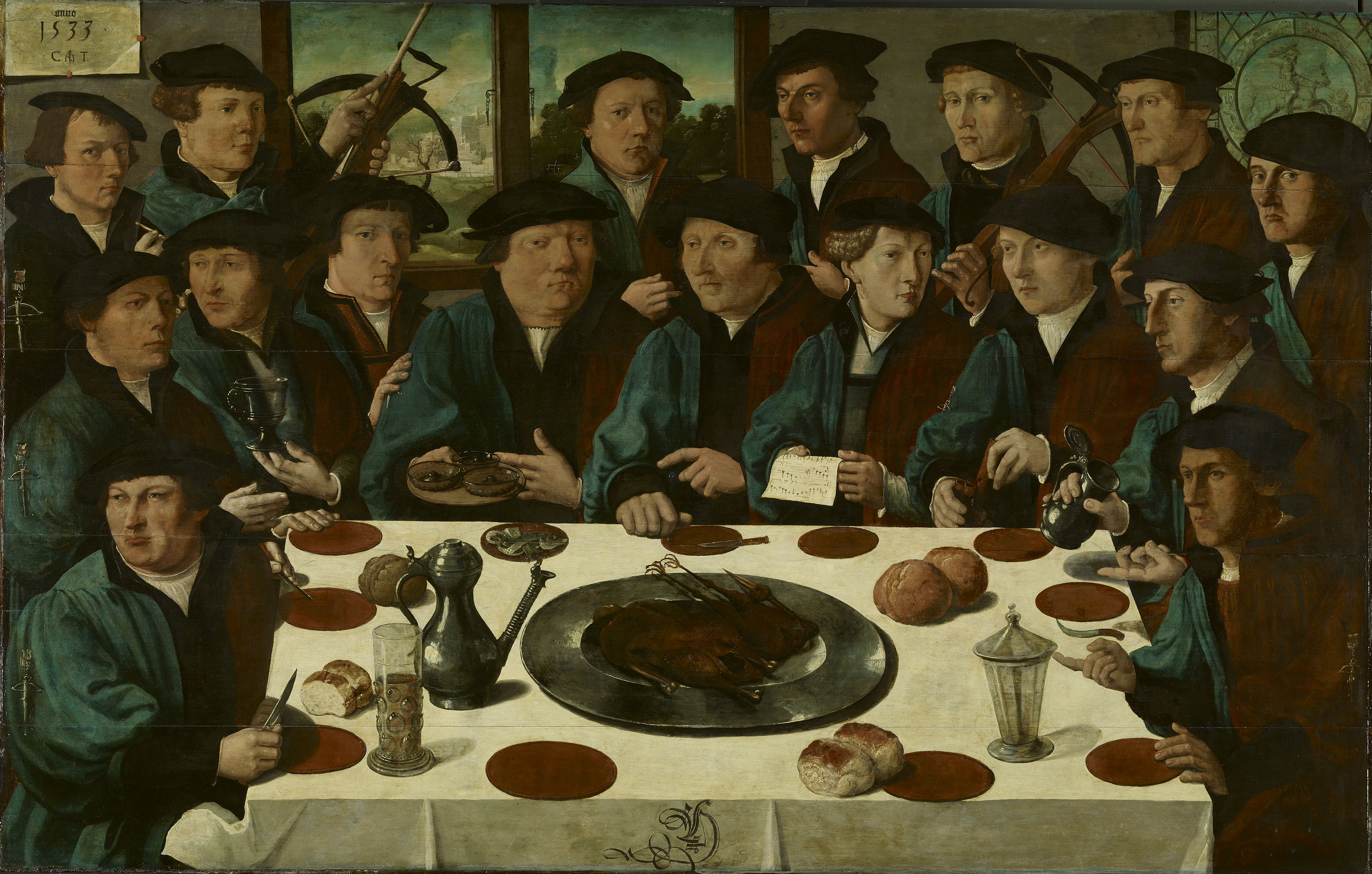
Cornelis Anthonisz. (1533), Banquet of Members of Amsterdam's Crossbow Civic Guard

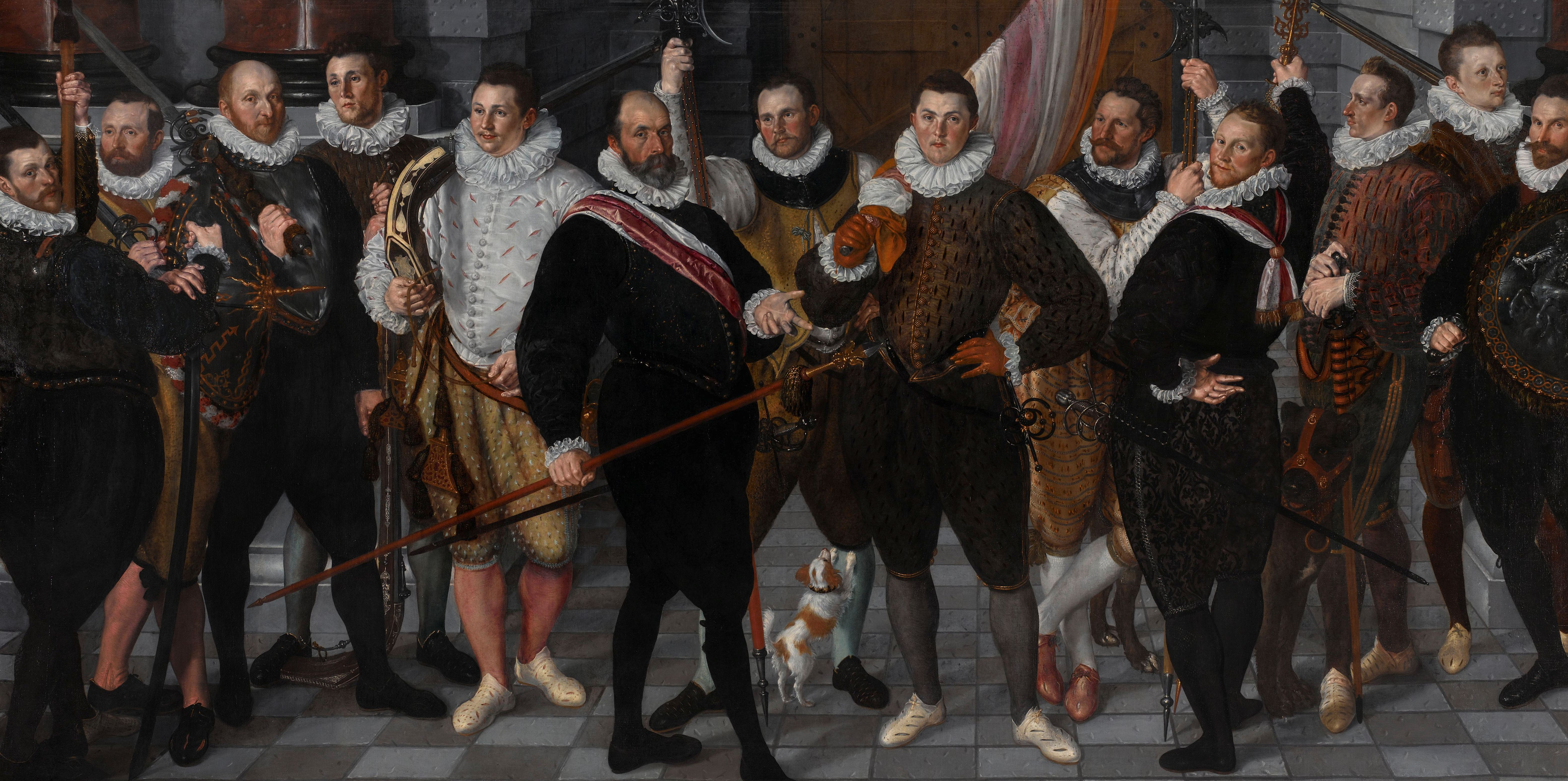
Cornelis Ketel (1588), The Company of Captain Dirck Jacobsz Rosecrans and Lieutenant Pauw

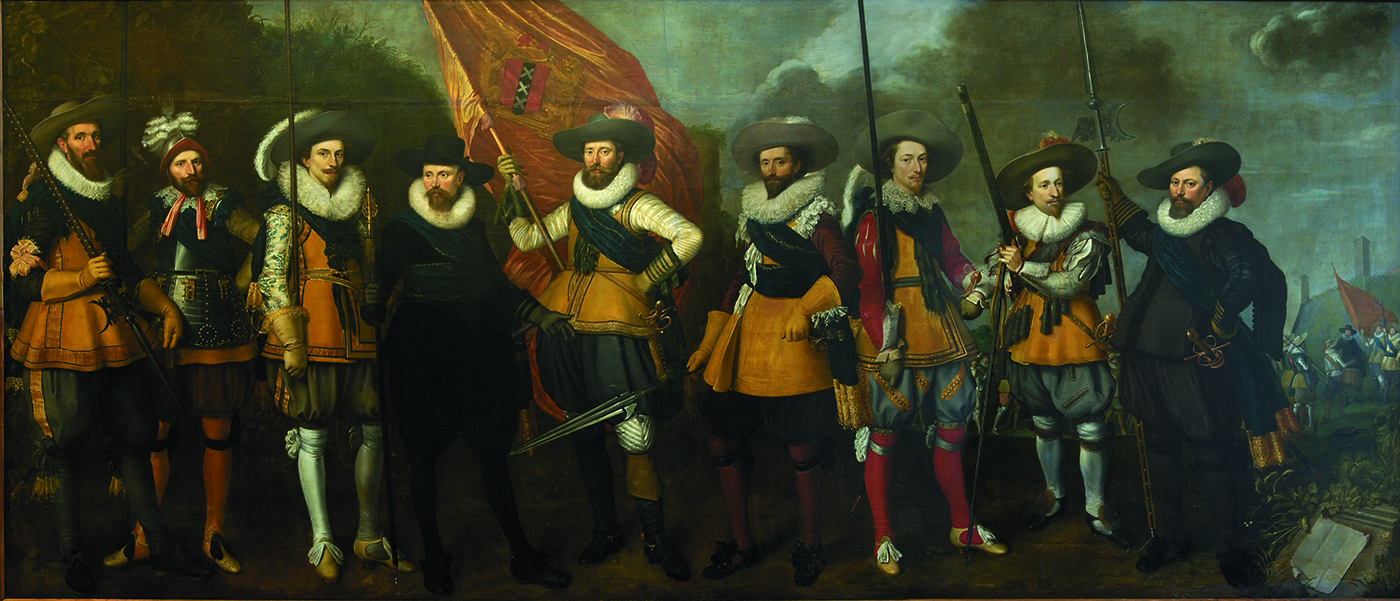
Nicolaes Lastman and Adriaen van Nieulandt (1623), Civic guardsmen from the squad of captain Abraham Boom and lieutenant Antonie Oetgens van Waveren

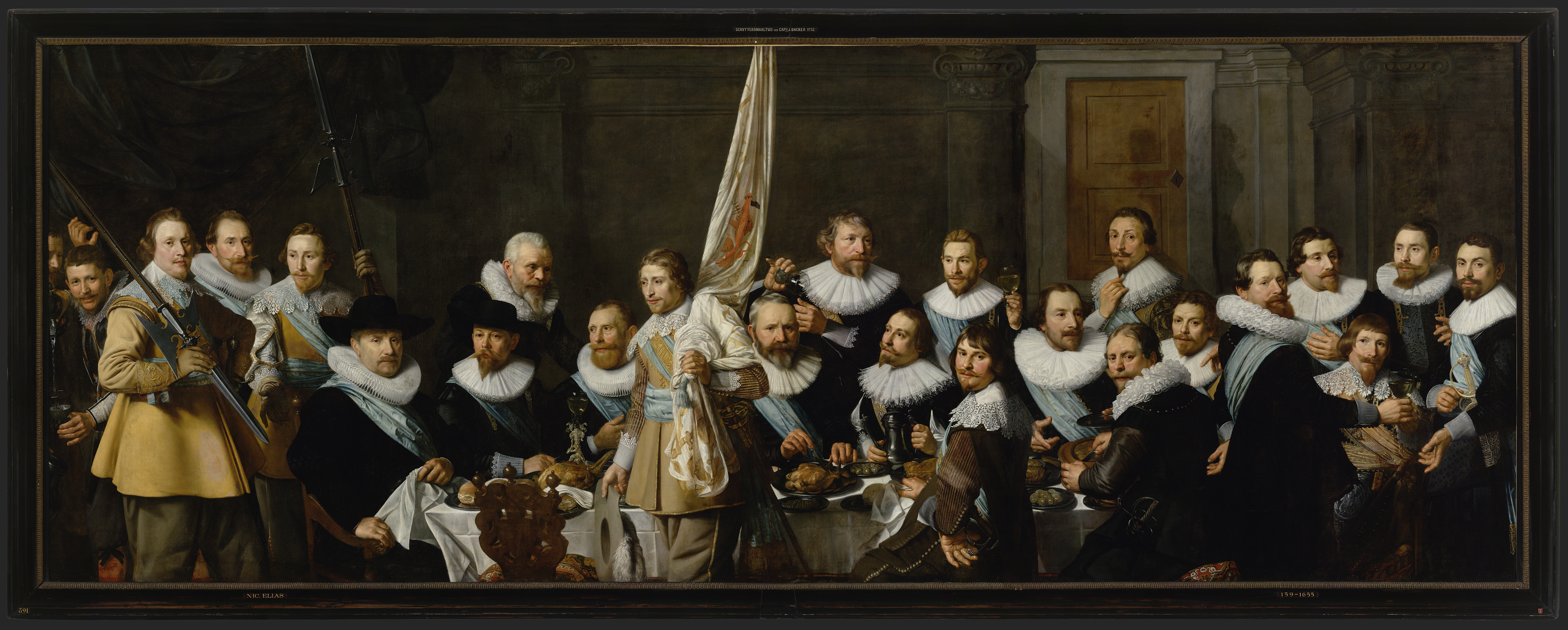
Nicolaes Pickenoy (1632), Banquet of civic guardsmen from the company of captain Jacob Backer and lieutenant Jacob Rogh

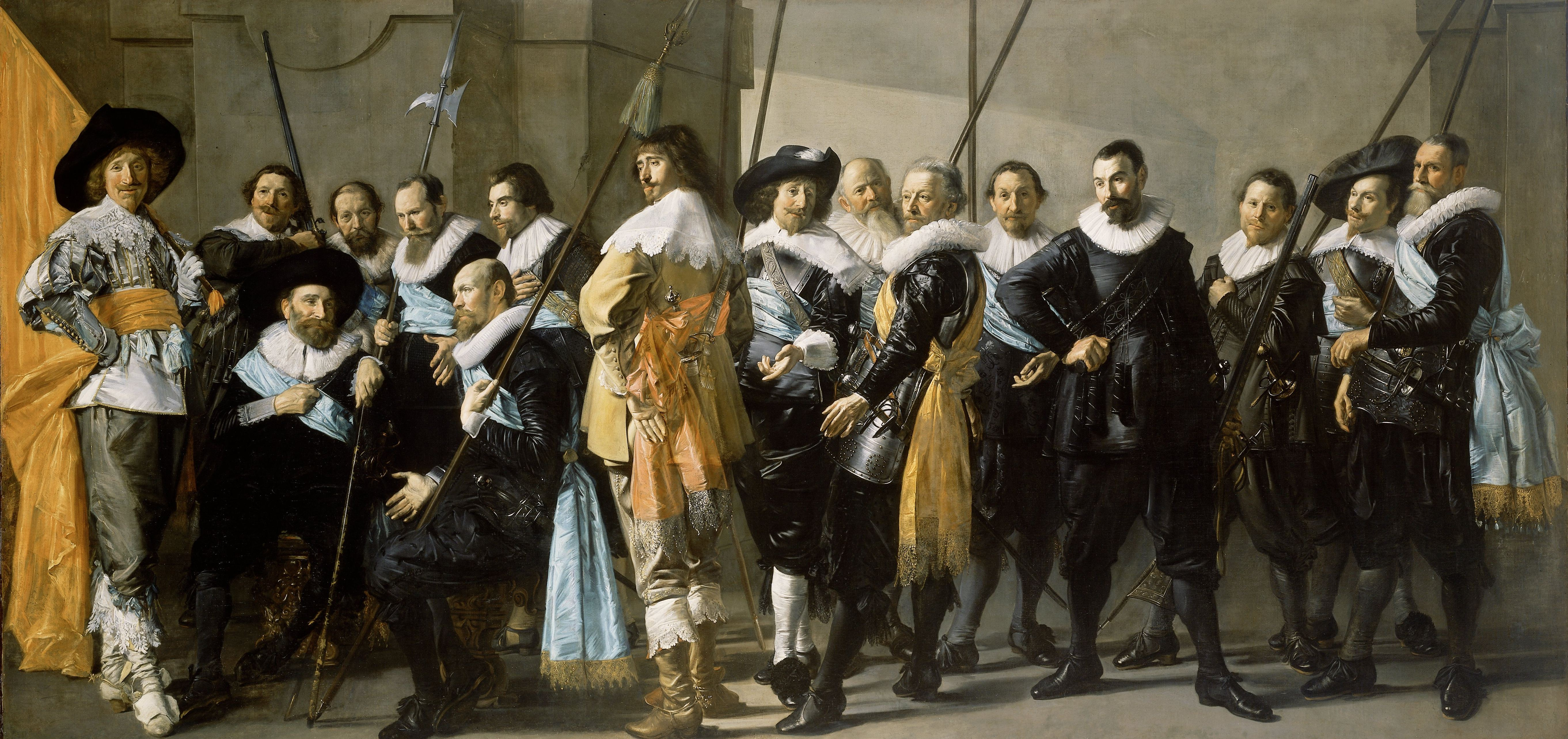
Frans Hals and Pieter Codde (1637), Militia Company of District XI under the Command of Captain Reynier Reael, better known as The Meagre Company

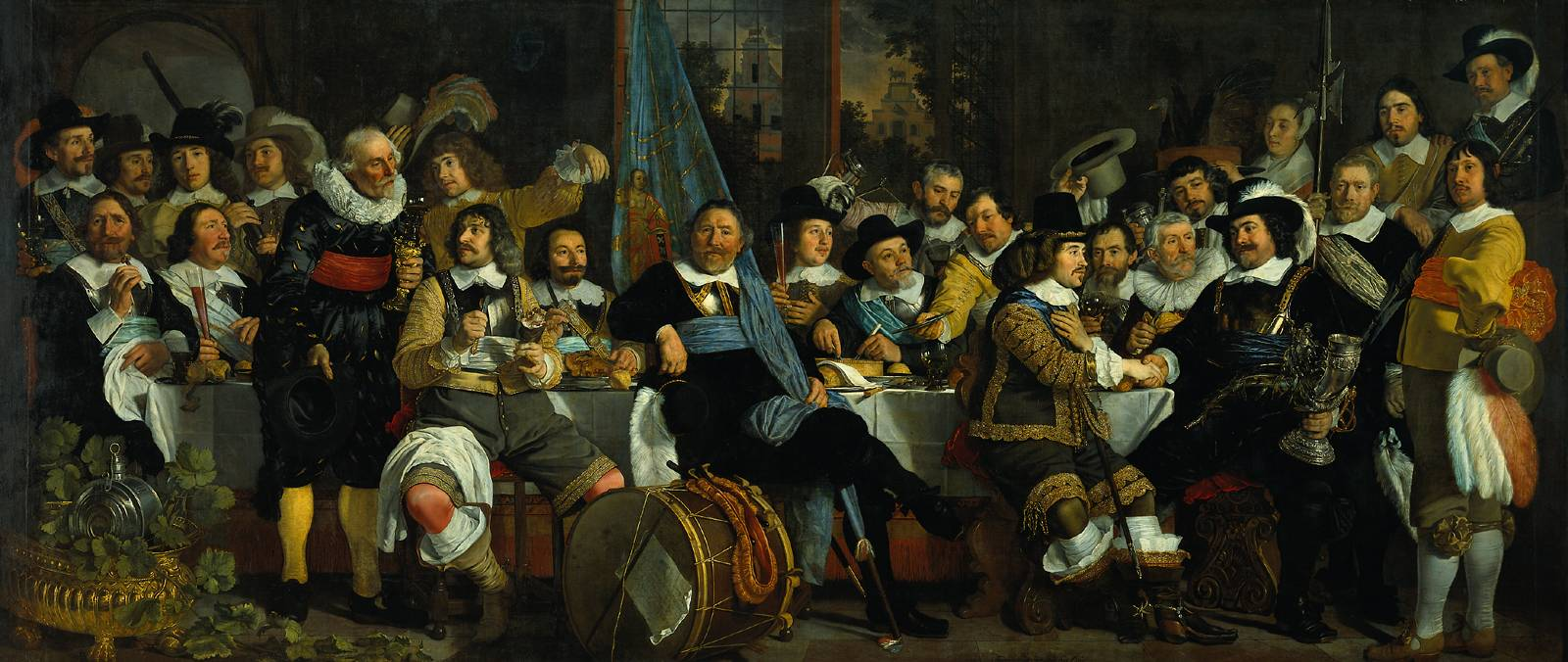
Bartholomeus van der Helst (c. 1649): Banquet at the Crossbowmen’s Guild in Celebration of the Treaty of Münster

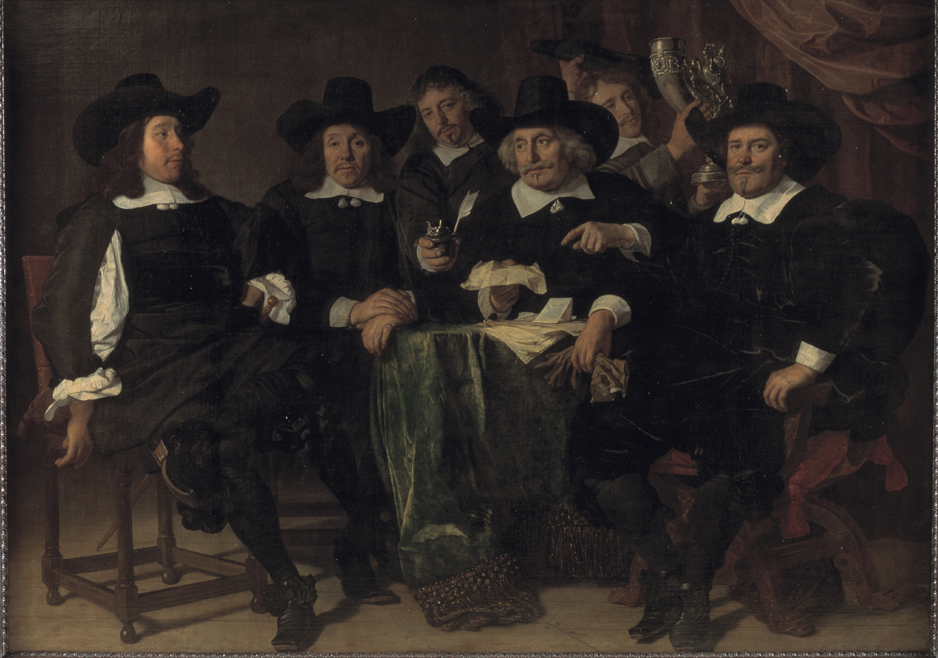
Bartholomeus van der Helst (1656): The headmen of the Crossbow Civic Guard House

== Related buildings ==
The Voetboogdoelen was one of three doelens (shooting ranges) for the Amsterdam civic guard, alongside the Handboogdoelen and Kloveniersdoelen, which were located along Singel and Kloveniersburgwal canal respectively. Of the three, only the Handboogdoelen survives.

Other Dutch towns, including The Hague, Leiden and 's-Hertogenbosch, also had a Voetboogdoelen or Sint-Jorisdoelen.

The original headquarters of the Dutch West India Company was the West-Indisch Huis (West India House, 1617), also in Amsterdam. The West-Indisch Pakhuis (West India Warehouse, 1642) in Amsterdam served as headquarters from 1647 until the Voetboogdoelen took over this function in 1674.
