= Amsterdam University Library =

Library

Coordinates: 52°22′04″N 4°53′22″E

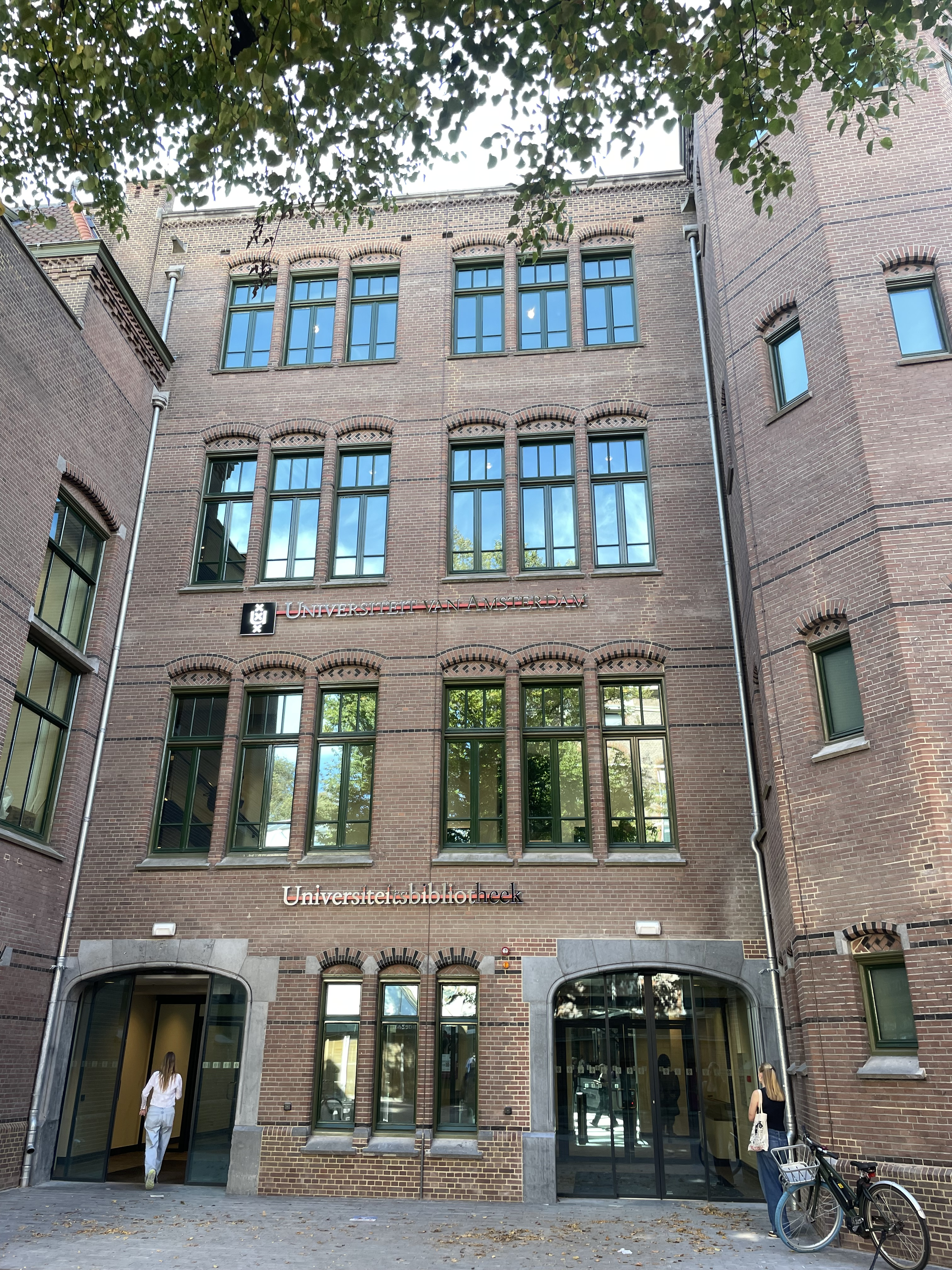
- The Library at Binnengasthuis (2025)
- Location: Singel, Amsterdam, The Netherlands
- Type: Academic library
- Established: 1578

Collection
- Size: 4 million volumes

Other information
- Director: Carlos Reijnen
- Website: www.uba.uva.nl/en

Amsterdam University Library is the library of the University of Amsterdam (UvA) and the Academic Medical Centre (AMC). From August 2025 the Library is located at Vendelstraat 2-8. Until June 2025 the central complex of the Library was in the town centre at Singel, close to Heiligeweg and Koningsplein. The Library's Special Collections are housed nearby at Oude Turfmarkt, next to UvA's Allard Pierson Museum. The Library also has a large book depot in the grounds of the AMC, with over 40.5 kilometers of books and other materials. The foundation Friends of the Library of the University of Amsterdam regularly donates special manuscripts or rare editions to the library collection.

== History ==
The origins of the library can be traced to 1578, when after the Alteratie (Alteration) books and manuscripts from Roman Catholic institutions in Amsterdam were gathered into a library open to one and all. This City Library was first housed in the Nieuwe Kerk and then moved to the attics of the Agnietenkapel at the founding of the Athenaeum Illustre in 1632. It was not until 1877, when the Athenaeum Illustre became the Municipal University, that the original City Library officially became the University Library.

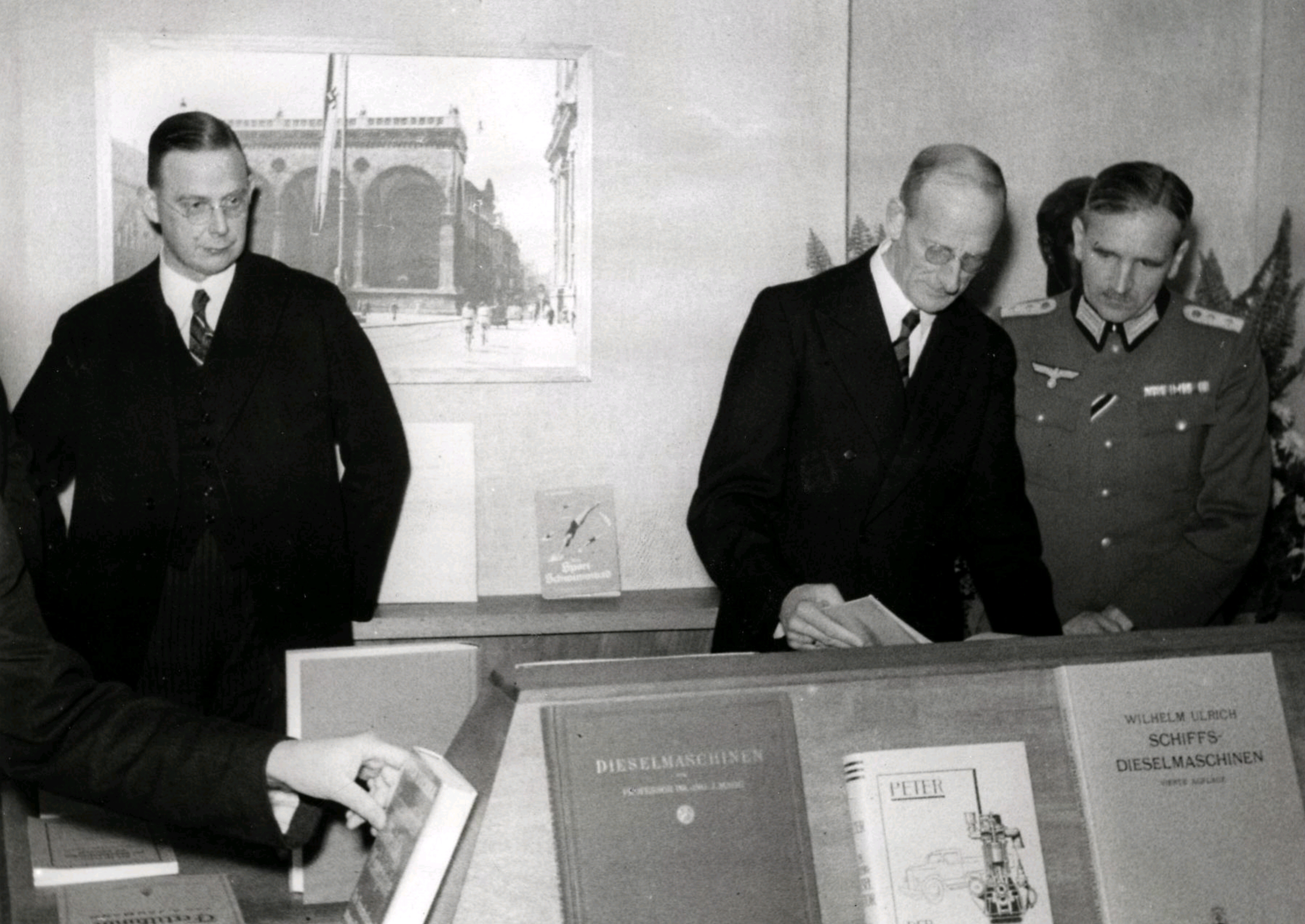
Exhibition The German scientific book (1941)

In the 19th century, the collection had become so large (and the Agnietenkapel so derelict) that the books were housed at several other locations, until 1881 when the library moved to the Handboogdoelen at Singel 421, the former home of the Long-bow militia. During restoration works in 1968, much of the original 16th-century building reappeared and it turned out that the Library probably contains some of the oldest masonry in town and the only fireplace with a late medieval mantelpiece. The buildings at Handboogstraat 16 and 18 were added in 1919, and during World War II also the building at Singel 423, which has a façade from 1609 by Hendrick de Keyser. This was originally the town arsenal and later served as the royal stables. Queen Wilhelmina, who had fled to London at the outbreak of the war, gave her written permission to add the building to the Library.

The main building at Singel 425 is from the 1960s. Here were originally the premises of the Arbalest Militia, and later the 19th-century Catholic St Catherine’s church. In 1939 the church was demolished and the plot left vacant until the second half of the Sixties, when the new building by architect Jan Leupen was built. This modern building is considered a typical example of 1960s architecture.

The Special Collections at Oude Turfmarkt are housed in two adjacent buildings: one from 1642, designed by Philips Vingboons, the other from 1842-1843 is the former St Bernardus mental home. The restoration work on the buildings started in 2004, and the Special Collections library was officially opened in May 2007 by Queen Beatrix.

== Collections ==
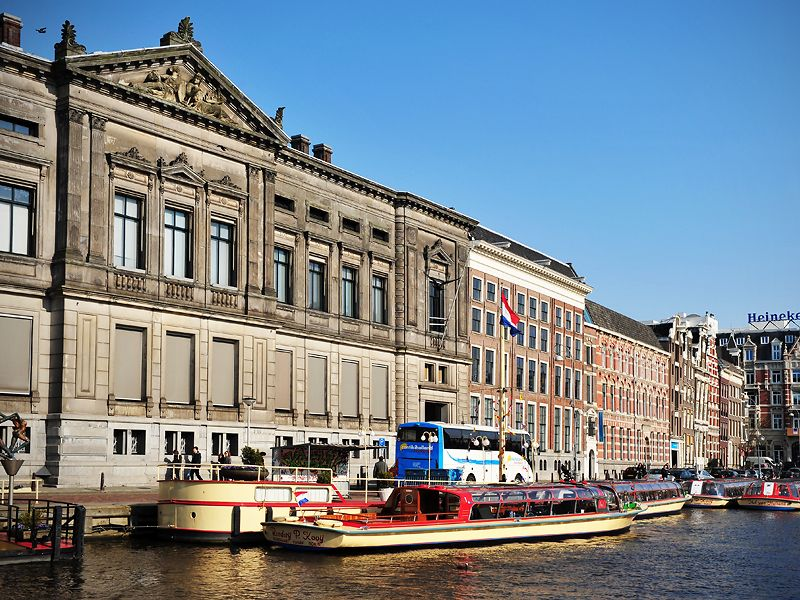
UvA Special Collections

In the course of its long history the Library has received many important collections, such as the library of Leeser Rosenthal, now called the Bibliotheca Rosenthaliana, on Jewish Cultural History. During the Second World War the Bibliotheca Rosenthaliana was confiscated and transported to Germany, but some of its most valuable items were hidden in the recently acquired Artis Library of the Amsterdam zoo Natura Artis Magistra. By a miracle this valuable collection was returned virtually undamaged after the war. There is also an impressive map collection, collections on the history of the book trade, on graphic design and typography, and on church history.

Special Collections have an image database (with a Dutch interface) where objects from its collections or even whole books can be viewed.

== Librarians ==
- Peter Vekemans van Meerhout (probably) (?–1603)
- Matthew Slade (Sladus) (1603–1628)
- Dionisius Vossius (1631–1633)
- Matthaeus Vossius (1633?–1646)
- Isaac Vossius (1646–1648)
- Prof. Arnoldus Senkward (1648–1667)
- The Rev. Johannes Heydanus (1667–1670)
- Prof. Gerardus Leonardus Blasius (1670–1682)
- The Rev. Cornelis Danckerts (1682–1693)
- The Rev. Petrus Schaak (1693–1708)
- Four successive mayors of Amsterdam (1708–1748):
  Quirijn van Strijen, Jan Trip, Jan van de Poll, Jan Six II
- The Rev. Cornelis Houthoff (1748–1752)
- Prof. Pieter Burman II (1752–1777)
- Jan Hendrik Verheyk (1778?–1784)
- Prof. Hendrik Constantijn Cras (1785–1820)
- Prof. David Jacob van Lennep (1820–1853)
- Pieter Anton Tiele (1853–1858)
- The Rev. David J. Lodeesen (1858–1862)
- Pieter de Holl Jr. (1862–1878)
- Prof. Hendrik Cornelis Rogge (1877–1890)
- Combertus Pieter Burger Jr. (1890–1924)
- Tietse Pieter Sevensma (1924–1928)
- Johann Samuel Theissen (1929–1935)
- Johan Berg (1936–1940)
- Prof. Herman de la Fontaine-Verwey (1941–1969)
- Prof. Sape van der Woude (1969–1976)
- Prof. Ernst Braches (1977–1988)
- B. Cohen (interim librarian 1988)
- Norbert P. van den Berg (1988–1997)
- Nol (A.J.H.A.) Verhagen (1997–2013)
- Maria A.M. Heijne (2013–2019)
- Dr. Bert Zeeman (interim director 2019–2020)
- G.J.M. (Gerard) Nijsten (interim director 2020–2023)
- Dr. Prof. F. P. (Fred) Weerman (interim director 2023 - now)

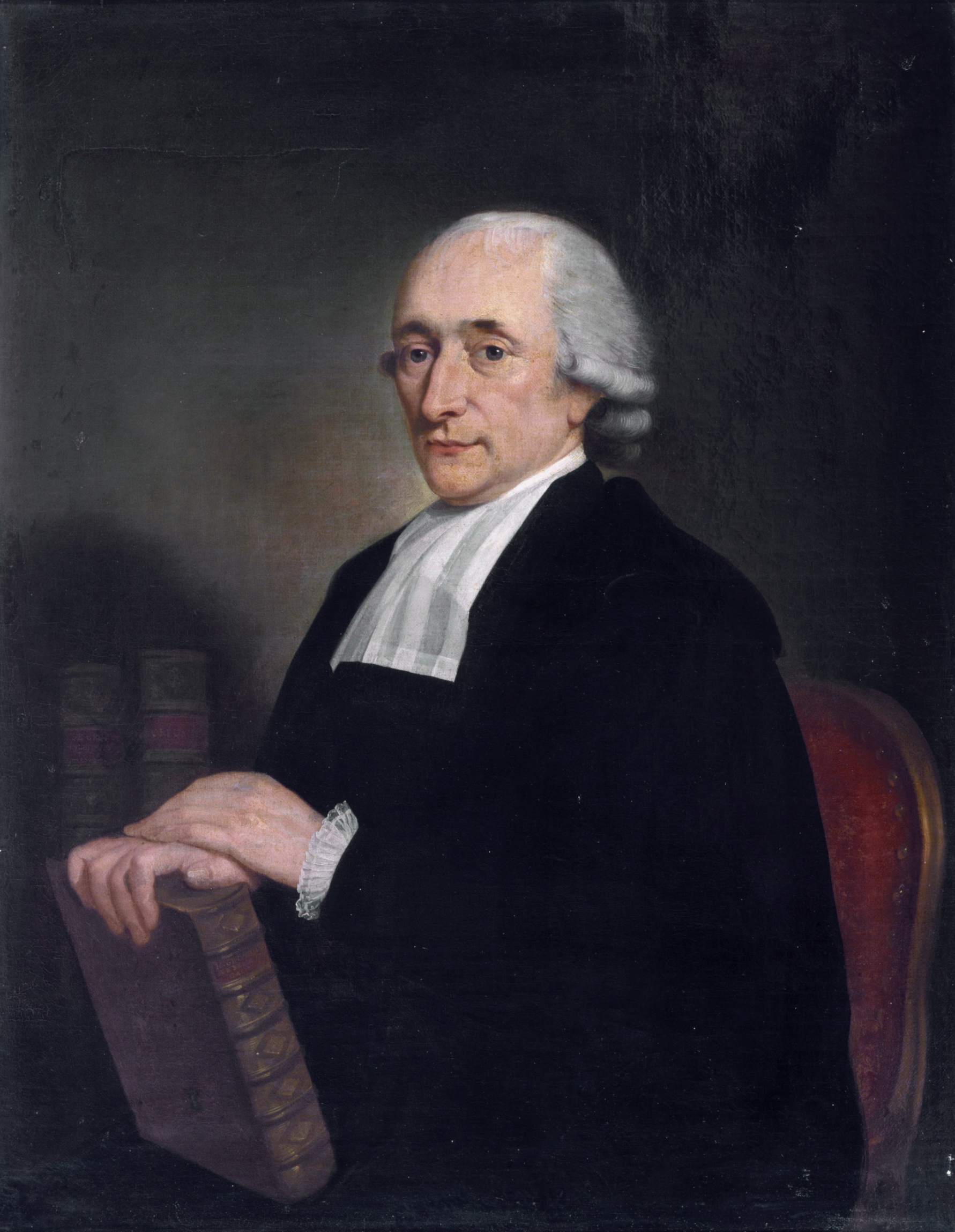
Hendrik Constantijn Cras (1739-1820), by Adriaan de Lelie (1755-1820)

== Bibliography ==
- Van den Berg, N.P. Bibliothecarissen (Universiteits)bibliotheek van Amsterdam sedert haar oprichting in 1578. [S.l.: s.n.], [1988]
- Van den Berg, N.P., Korte geschiedenis van het universitaire boekenbezit: rede uitgesproken t.b.v. de UAV-dag 19 okt. 1991. [S.l.: s.n.], 1991.
- Van den Berg, N.P., Overzicht van de belangrijkste geschenken en bruiklenen aan de Universiteitsbibliotheek Amsterdam (1855-1981). [S.l.: s.n.], 1994.
- Catalogus catalogorum ad collectiones Bibliothecae Universitatis Amstelodamensis. Amsterdam: Universiteitsbibliotheek, [1983]
- Kleijn, Koen. Schutters en studenten: de geschiedenis van de Universiteitsblbiotheek. Amsterdam: Stadsuitgeverij Amsterdam, 1992. ISBN 90-5366-051-8
- Universiteitsbibliotheek van Amsterdam
- Universiteitsbibliotheek van Amsterdam, Bijzondere Collecties: Geschiedenis1450-2007
- Offenberg, A. K., Emile G. L. Schrijver, and F. J. Hoogewoud. Bibliotheca Rosenthaliana: treasures of Jewish booklore : marking the 200th anniversary of the birth of Leeser Rosenthal, 1794-1994. Amsterdam: Amsterdam University Press, 1994. ISBN 9053560882; 9789053560884. OCLC Number: 32116020.
- Bibliotheca Rosenthaliana, Itzhak Ben-Zvi, and Lajb Fuks. Bibliotheca Rosenthaliana. Amsterdam: Bibliothèque de l'Université, 1958.
- Cohen, Evelyn M., Elka Deitsch, and Ardon Bar-Hama. A journey through Jewish worlds: highlights from the Braginsky Collection of Hebrew manuscripts and printed books; [in conjunction with the Exhibition A Journey through Jewish Worlds: Highlights from the Braginsky Collection of Hebrew Manuscripts and Printed Books, held at Bibliotheca Rosenthaliana, Bijzondere Collecties, Universiteit van Amsterdam, 16 October 2009 – 18 January 2010; Yeshiva University Museum, New York, 17 March 2010 – 11 July 2010; Israel Museum, Jerusalem, December 2010 - April 2011]. Amsterdam: Bijzondere Collecties, Univ. van Amsterdam, 2009.
- Hoogewoud, F.J. Louis Hirschel's List of Unique and Rare Items from the Bibliotheca Rosenthaliana. Studia Rosenthaliana. 2006, 39: 73-99.
- De La Fontaine Verwey, H. The Bibliotheca Rosenthaliana during the German Occupation. Studia Rosenthaliana. 2006, 38: 61-72.
- Studia Rosenthaliana. Leuven: Peeters, 2003. ISSN 1781-7838.
