= John Adams Institute =

John Adams Institute may refer to:

- John Adams Institute for Accelerator Science, located in the Denys Wilkinson Building at Oxford University
- John Adams Institute for American Culture in the Netherlands, located in the West-Indisch Huis in Amsterdam
