= Meagre Company =

Painting of Amsterdam schutterij by Frans Hals

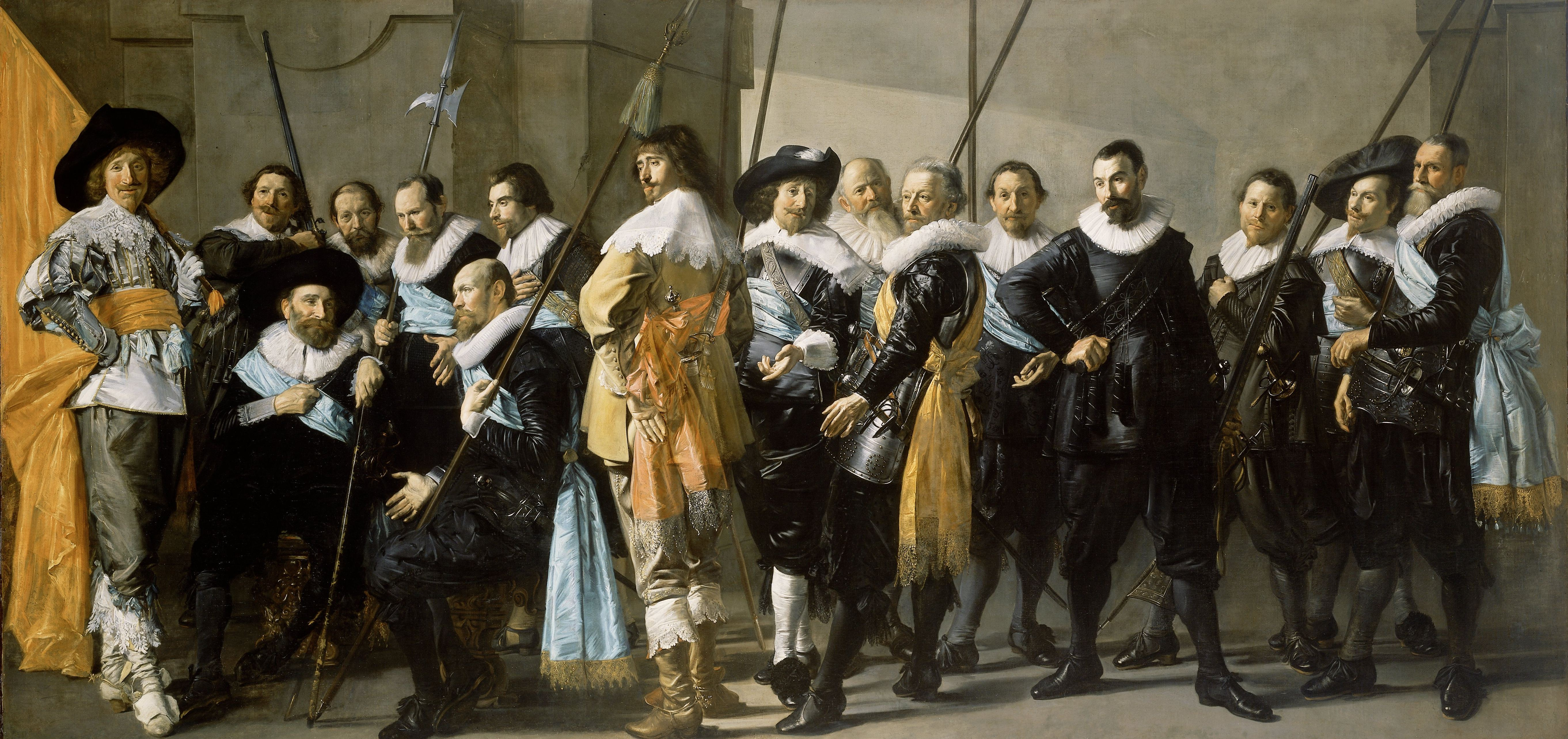
- Artist: Frans Hals
- Year: 1633-1637
- Medium: Oil on canvas
- Dimensions: 209 cm × 429 cm (82 in × 169 in)
- Location: Rijksmuseum; Amsterdam

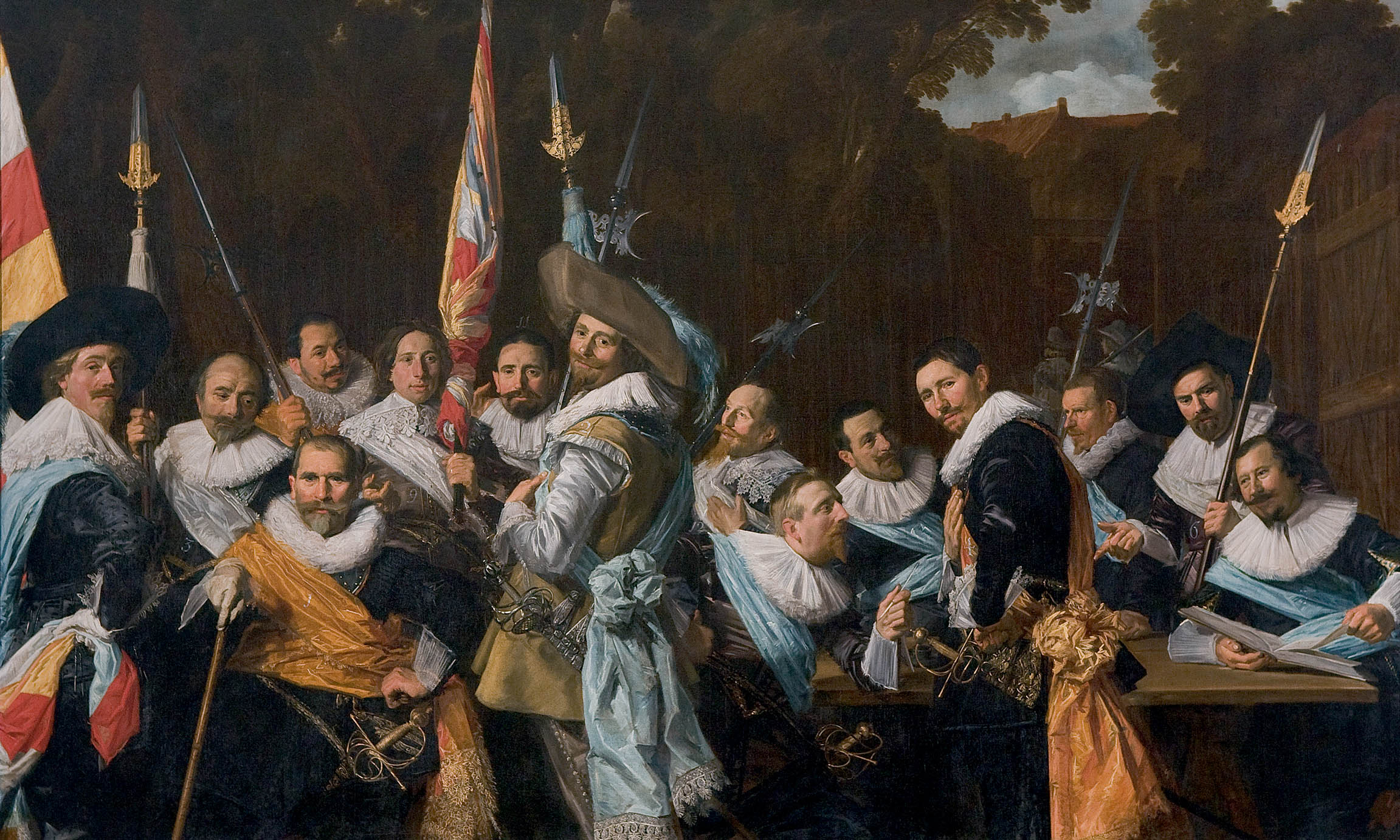
The Officers of the St Adrian Militia Company in 1633. The portraits of the men are cut off at the knee in the traditional Haarlem style

The Meagre Company, or The Company of Captain Reinier Reael and Lieutenant Cornelis Michielsz Blaeuw, refers to the only militia group portrait, or schutterstuk, painted by Frans Hals outside of Haarlem. Today the painting is in the collection of the Amsterdam Museum, on loan to the Rijksmuseum, where it is considered one of its main attractions of the Honor Gallery. Hals was unhappy about commuting to Amsterdam to work on the painting and, unlike his previous group portraits, was unable to deliver it on time. The sitters contracted Pieter Codde to finish the work.

Hals was originally commissioned in 1633, after the favorable reception of his previous militia group portrait, The Officers of the St Adrian Militia Company in 1633, in which all ensigns are holding flags and all officers are holding their weapons. The sergeants were shown, holding halberds to differentiate them from officers with spontoons. Hals seems to have initially intended an Amsterdam version of the same painting, beginning on the left with a smiling flag bearer wearing a flamboyant cut-sleeve jacket with lace and holding a flag in the color of his sash. Though it is impossible to tell on which side of the canvas Hals began painting, the light falls onto the figures from the left in the "standard" Hals tradition and this is also where the most important figures are situated within the painting. Since each sitter paid for his own portrait, it is presumed that Hals began with the most important sitters in order to "sell" canvas room to other paying officers. Whether or not Hals did in fact start on the left or drew a sketch of the entire group at once, the flag bearer on the left in this painting has been painted in a remarkably flamboyant way from the tip of his hat to the toe of his boots. This was possibly to prove to the decision makers in Amsterdam that Hals was capable of painting a schutterstuk in the "Amsterdam style", which included the entire figure. In Haarlem, the civic guards were traditionally portrayed in the kniestuk style of being "cut off at the knee" in three-quarter length portraits.

The flag bearer is Nicolaes van Bambeeck. Seated next to him are Captain Reael, with hat and commander's staff, and Lieutenant Cornelis Michielsz Blaeuw, balding and holding a spontoon. The further to the right, however, the less the two paintings resemble each other. In 1636 Hals was called to Amsterdam to finish the painting, but he refused, offering to receive the sitters in his Haarlem studio with assurances that they would not need to sit very long. His offer was refused, and Codde was hired to finish the piece. Because the men are thinner than the men portrayed in other, later, Amsterdam schutterstukken hanging near this painting, the piece was later nicknamed the "meagre company". Besides the ensign and the seated men, the names of the other officers are unknown today.

== Comments by Van Gogh ==
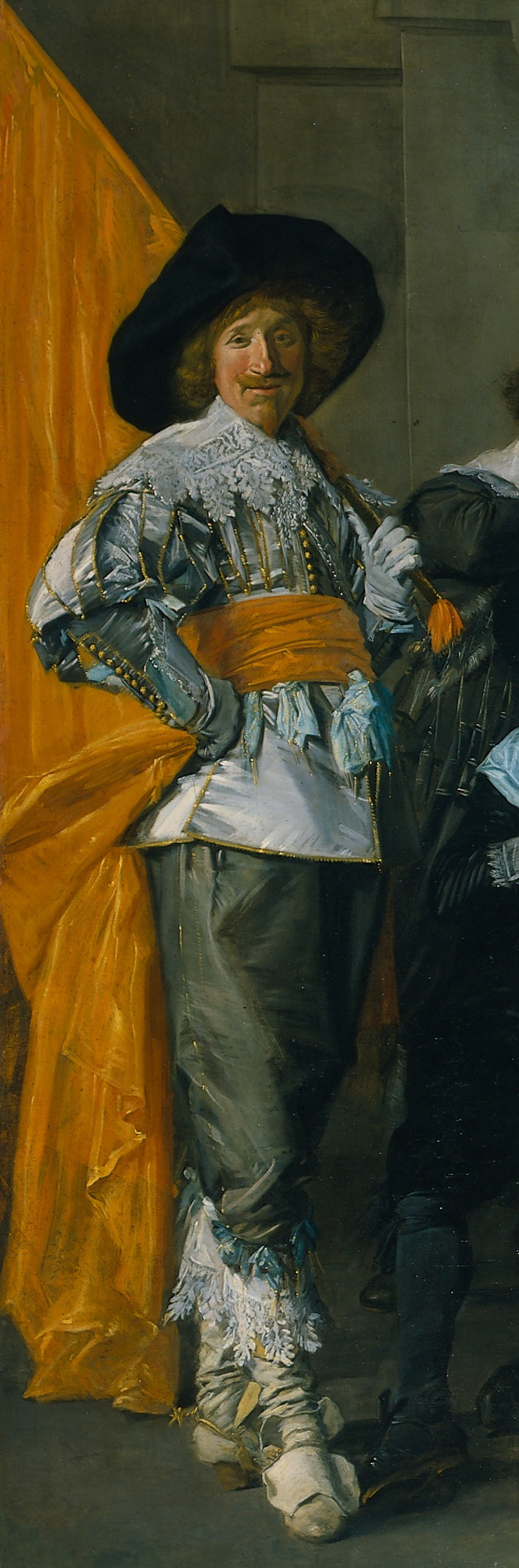
The figure of the standard-bearer in the extreme left corner, right up against the frame

The post-impressionist painter Vincent van Gogh was inspired by the painting, which he saw when he paid a visit to The Night Watch in the newly opened Rijksmuseum in 1885. He sent an enthusiastic letter about it to his brother Theo:

I don’t know whether you remember that to the left of the Night watch, in other words as a pendant to the Syndics, there’s a painting — it was unknown to me until now — by Frans Hals and P. Codde, 20 or so officers full length. Have you noticed it??? In itself, that painting alone makes the trip to Amsterdam well worth while, especially for a colourist. There’s a figure in it, the figure of the standard-bearer in the extreme left corner, right up against the frame. That figure is in grey from top to toe, let’s call it pearl grey, — of a singular neutral tone — probably obtained with orange and blue mixed so that they neutralize each other — by varying this basic colour in itself — by making it a little lighter here, a little darker there, the whole figure is as it were painted with one and the same grey. But the leather shoes are a different material from the leggings, which are different from the folds of the breeches, which are different from the doublet — expressing different materials, very different in colour one from another, still all one family of grey — but wait! Into that grey he now introduces blue and orange — and some white. The doublet has satin ribbons of a divine soft blue. Sash and flag orange — a white collar.

Orange, white, blue, as the national colours were then. Orange and blue next to each other, that most glorious spectrum — on a ground of grey judiciously mixed, precisely by uniting just those two, let me call them poles of electricity (in terms of colour, though) so that they obliterate each other, a white against that grey. Further carried through in that painting — other orange spectrums against a different blue, further the most glorious blacks against the most glorious whites — the heads — some twenty — sparkling with spirit and life, and how they’re done! and what colour! the superb appearance of all those fellows, full length. But that orange, white, blue chap in the left corner — — …… I’ve seldom seen a more divinely beautiful figure — — it’s something marvellous.

Delacroix would have adored it — just adored it to the utmost.

== Voetboogdoelen ==
The painting previously hung with others in the old Archer's meeting hall called the "Voetboogdoelen", located on the Singel. It was located there until the building was demolished to build the library of the University of Amsterdam. The group paintings that formerly hung in this hall have been since transferred to the Amsterdam Museum, except for this one and a later one by Bartholomeus van der Helst, which are both on permanent loan to the Rijksmuseum.

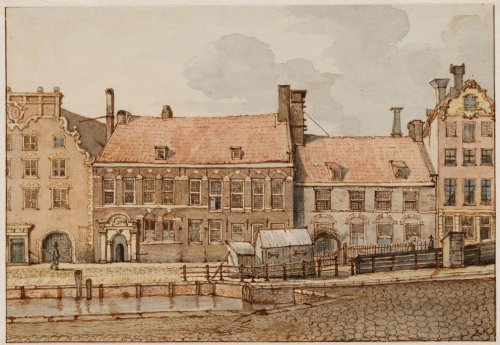
The Voetboogdoelen drawn by Gerrit Lamberts around 1820.

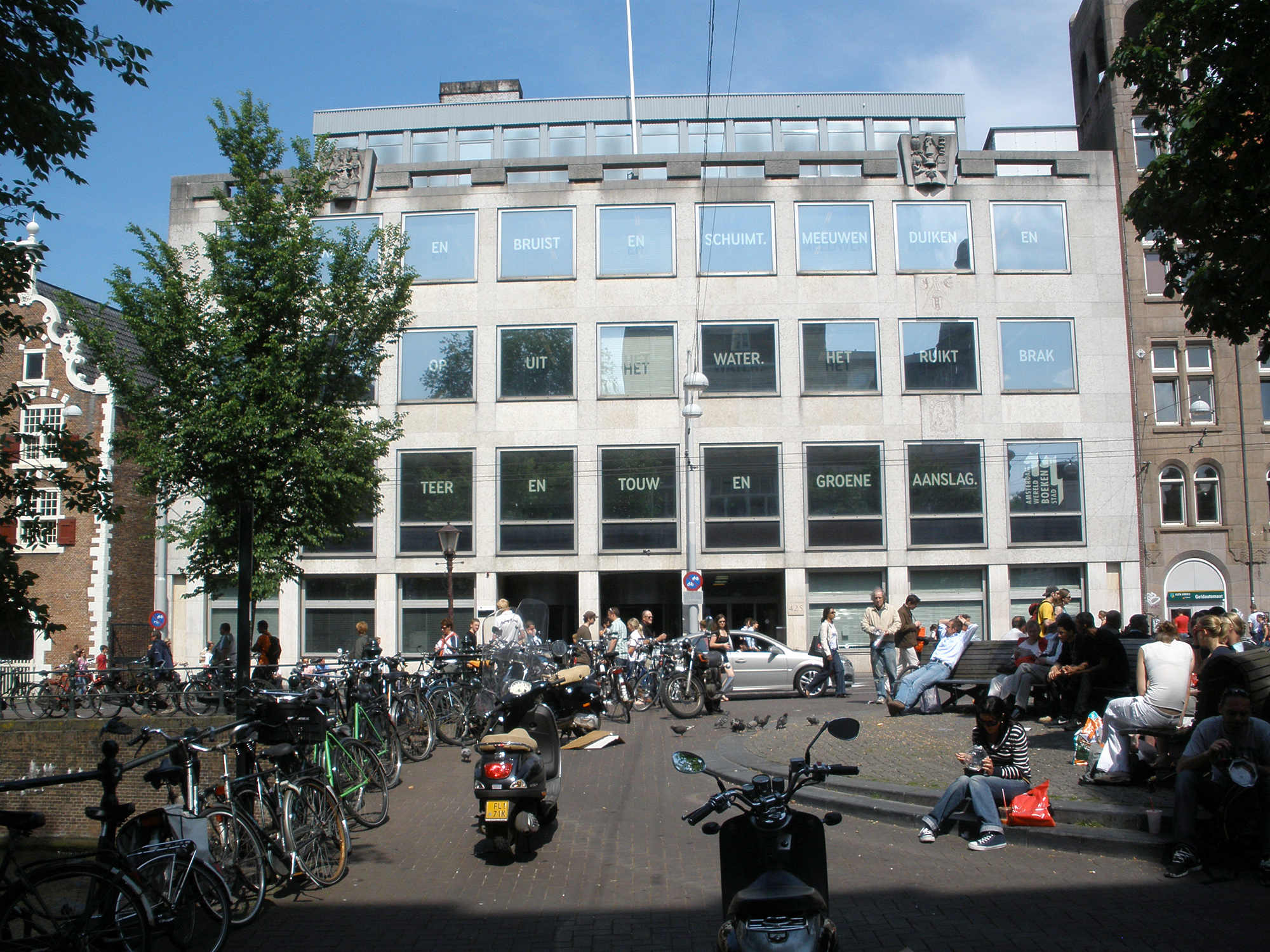
University library on the Koningsplein

== Influence on later Amsterdam group portraits ==
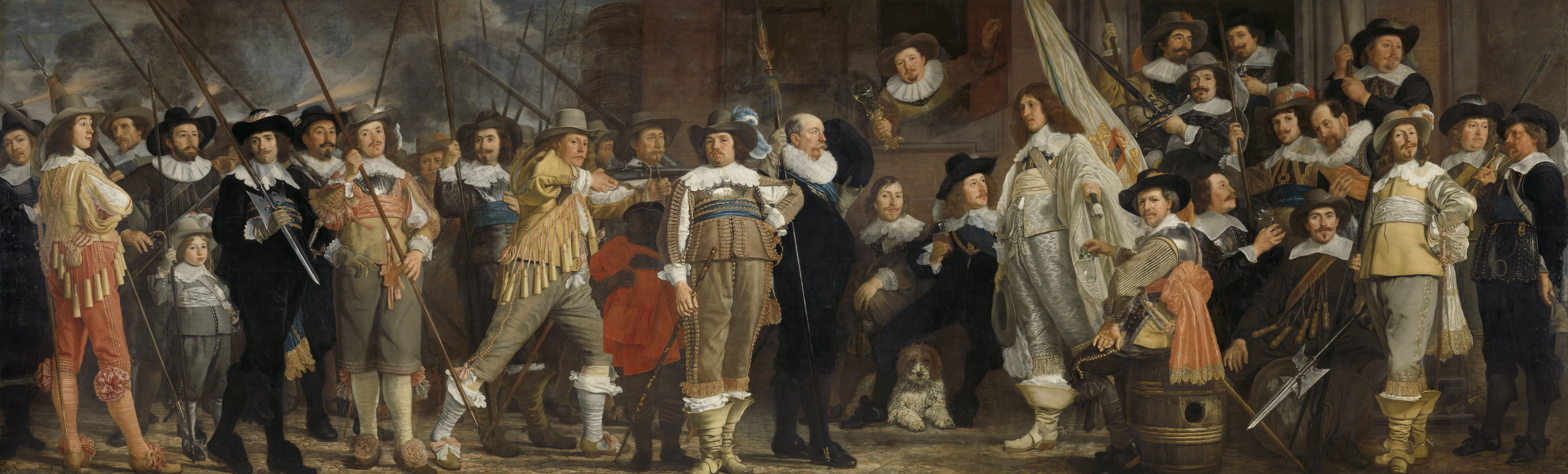
The Company of Roelof Bicker and lieutenant Jan Michielsz Blaeuw in 1639, by Van der Helst

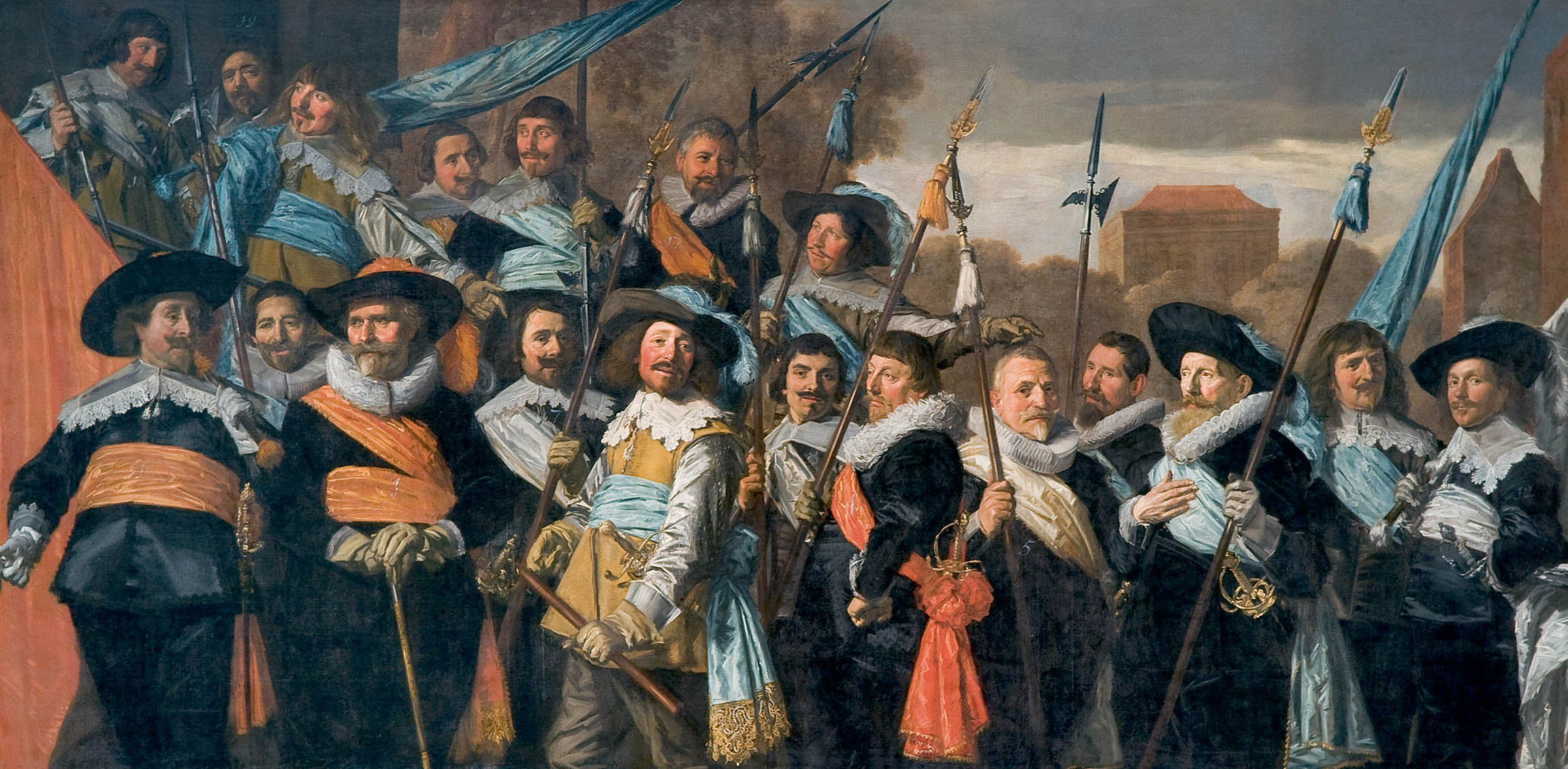
The Officers of the St George Militia Company in 1639, by Hals

The 'Meagre Company' currently hangs across from its successor, the next militia group portrait to be painted in Amsterdam, Van der Helst's The Company of Roelof Bicker and Lieutenant Jan Michielsz Blaeuw, completed in 1639. These paintings are both hung near Rembrandt's The Night Watch, which was completed well over a decade after Hals' commission, in 1642. Casual observers over the centuries have noticed how much fatter the officers became in that time, which is how the Meagre Company got its nickname. The nickname "Meagre company" appears to have been first used by the 18th-century art historian Jan van Dijk in his "Kunst en Historie Kundige beschrijving en opmerkingen over alle de schilderijen op het stadhuis", p. 30, no. 20.

Van der Helst was himself the son of an innkeeper in Haarlem, and, like Hals, had taken advantage of the new trekschuit commuting service between Haarlem and Amsterdam in 1632 along the Haarlemmertrekvaart. Whereas Hals gave up his Amsterdam commission to concentrate on his next Haarlem group portrait, The Officers of the St George Militia Company in 1639, Van der Helst seems to have embraced Amsterdam and at the young age of 23, even married there in 1636, the year that Hals was replaced by Codde. Van der Helst was probably a pupil of either Codde or Hals, as very little is documented about his training. In his 1639 group, he was clearly influenced by Hals, since he added design ideas from the Meagre Company as well as from Hals' later 1639 Haarlem group.

If there was a competition in Amsterdam to win militia group portrait commissions, then Van der Helst was clearly favored above Codde. Codde was never given another militia group portrait commission, although he went on to become a successful painter who could afford a house on the Keizersgracht. Van der Helst, on the other hand, went on to paint several more militia group portrait commissions as well as group portraits for other Amsterdam municipal organizations.

== See also ==
- List of paintings by Frans Hals
- Haarlem schutterij
