= Tietse Pieter Sevensma =

Dutch author, editor, encyclopedist and librarian (1879–1966)

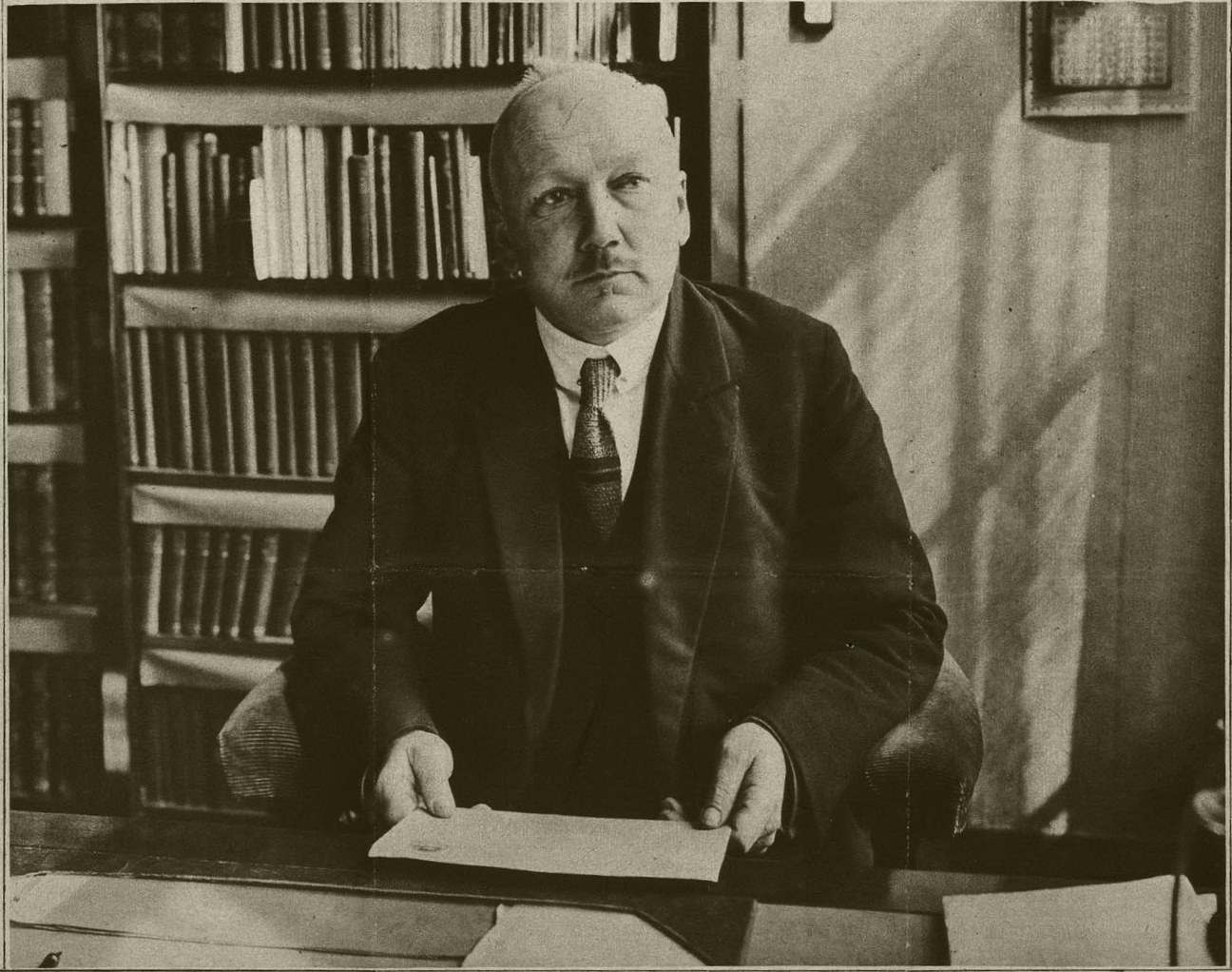
- T.P. Sevensma
- Born: 22 July 1879; Sneek, Netherlands
- Died: 30 June 1966 (aged 86); Hilversum, Netherlands
- Education: theology, political science
- Alma mater: University of Amsterdam, Doopsgezind Seminarium (Baptist Seminary, Amsterdam)
- Occupations: Author, editor and librarian
- Spouses: Margaretha Wijbrandi, Nelly Laura Winkel

Tietse Pieter Sevensma (22 July 1879 – 30 June 1966) was a Dutch theologian, political scientist, author, editor, encyclopedist and international librarian.

== Career ==
Born in Sneek, Frisia, the Netherlands, Sevensma studied theology and later political science in Amsterdam. After completing his modernist doctoral thesis on the Jewish ark (De ark Gods, het Oud-Israëlitisch heiligdom, 1908) he studied political science (Staatswetenschappen) but then took to establishing libraries, at the Rotterdam Nederlandsche Handels-Hoogeschool (Rotterdam business school, the forerunner of Erasmus University) from 1908 up to 1916, and the Amsterdam public reading room as a director since 1916, where he added a library for the blind and sheet music. In 1912 he was a co-founder of the Dutch national librarian society (Nederlandse Vereniging van Bibliothecarissen, NVB) and served as its first president from 1912 - 1923.

Sevensma was editor-in-chief of the Dutch encyclopedias Zoek-licht, Nederlandsche encyclopædie voor allen (1922–1925, 1931, 9 volumes), Het nieuwe zoeklicht, Nederlandse encyclopædie voor allen (1941, 4 volumes), and Zoek-licht encyclopedie. Vraagbaak voor Noord- en Zuid-Nederland in tien delen (1956–1960, 10 volumes, with G. Schmook).

Since 1924 he also directed and reorganised the University of Amsterdam library. A next career step brought him to Switzerland: between 1928 and 1938 he led the League of Nations Library at Geneva and rebuilt it there using a donation from John D. Rockefeller Jr. starting in 1930, as it still stands as of 2025 as the United Nations Library and Archives building. In 1929, Sevensma was appointed Secretary General of the International Federation of Library Associations, a post he held until 1958.

In 1938, Sevensma returned to the Netherlands to be Librarian of Leiden University up to 1947. In 1939 he bought Willem de Vreese's Bibliotheca Neerlandica Manuscripta, a documentation system of Middle Dutch manuscripts. During the Second World War the Leiden university library remained open, but the university was closed on 27 November 1940 on the orders of the German occupying authorities, after the protest of professor Rudolph Cleveringa against the obligatory firing of 37 Jewish university personnel, including two library assistants who were later murdered by the Germans. Sevensma successfully protected the Leiden library inventory of manuscripts against predatory despoliation by German librarians.

== Publications ==
- Sevensma, Tietse Pieter (1985) [1908]. De ark Gods, het Oud-Israëlitisch heiligdom [The Ark of God, the Ancient Israelite Shrine] (in Dutch). Amsterdam: J. Clausen. ISBN 0837052335. OCLC 77639215. XII, 166 pages. Dutch PhD thesis theology.
- Tentoonstellings-commissie der nationale tentoonstelling van het boek, Vereeniging ter Bevordering van de Belangen des Boekhandels (1911). Catalogus van boeken in Noord-Nederland verschenen van den vroegsten tijd tot op heden (in Dutch). 's-Gravenhage: Nijhoff. OCLC 781584824.
- Sevensma, T.P. (1922–1925). Zoek-licht : Nederlandsche encyclopædie voor allen. Arnhem: Van Loghum Slaterus & Visser. OCLC 769784284. Supplement, 1931.
  - Sevensma, T.P. (1939–1952). Het nieuwe zoek-licht : Nederlandse encyclopaedie voor allen (in Dutch). Arnhem: Van Loghum Slaterus. OCLC 66261418. Contents Vol. 1: A-Cessie, 1939. Vol. 2: Cestie-Ganglion, 1939. Vol. 3: Gangreen-Kyrie eleison, 1940. Vol. 4: L-Raamsdonk, 1941. Vol. 5: Raamwerk-Zyrick, 1948. Supplement, 1952.
  - Sevensma, T.P.; Schmook, G. (1956–1962). Zoek-licht encyclopedie : vraagbaak voor Noord- en Zuid-Nederland in tien delen (in Dutch). Arnhem: Van Loghum Slaterus. OCLC 71423329. Encyclopedia in 11 volumes, third completely revised edition.
- Sevensma, T.P. (1929). La Bibliothèque de la Société des Nations (in French). Paris: Champion. OCLC 458818383. 13 pages. Association des bibliothécaires français
  - Sevensma, T.P. (1937). The League of nations library. London, Hertford: S. Shand. OCLC 459561576. 14 pages. Reprint from: The Library association record, Sept.-Oct. 1937.
- Sevensma, T.P. (1946). Nederlandsche helden der wetenschap, Levensschetsen van Nobelprijswinnaars. Hoogtepunten van wetenschappelijken arbeid in Nederland [Dutch heroes of science. Biographical sketches of Nobelprize winners. Highlights of scientific work in the Netherlands] (in Dutch). Amsterdam: Uitgevers-Maatschappij "Kosmos". OCLC 503783545. 351 pages.

== Secondary literature ==
- Berkvens-Stevelinck, Christiane (2012). Magna commoditas : Leiden University's great asset : 425 years library collections and services. Translated by UvA Talen, Amsterdam. Leiden: Leiden University Press. pp. 199, 201–203, 213, 215, 219. ISBN 9789087281656. OCLC 794706996.
- Breycha-Vauthier, Arthur (1967). Tietse Pieter Sevensma : 1879-1966. Kurzportrait des Bibliothekars Tietse Pieter Sevensma (in German). OCLC 887983287.
- Valauskas, Edward J. (Spring 2004). "The Pioneers: Tietse Pieter Sevensma (1879-1958)". World Libraries. 14 (1). Dominican University School of Information Studies, Dominican University (Illinois). Archived from the original on 2022-01-31. "Tietse Pieter Sevensma was one of the most significant Dutch librarians in the last century with remarkable influence on international librarianship for decades."
