= West-Indisch Huis =

Former headquarters of the Dutch West Indies Company

Coordinates: 52°22′48″N 4°53′31″E

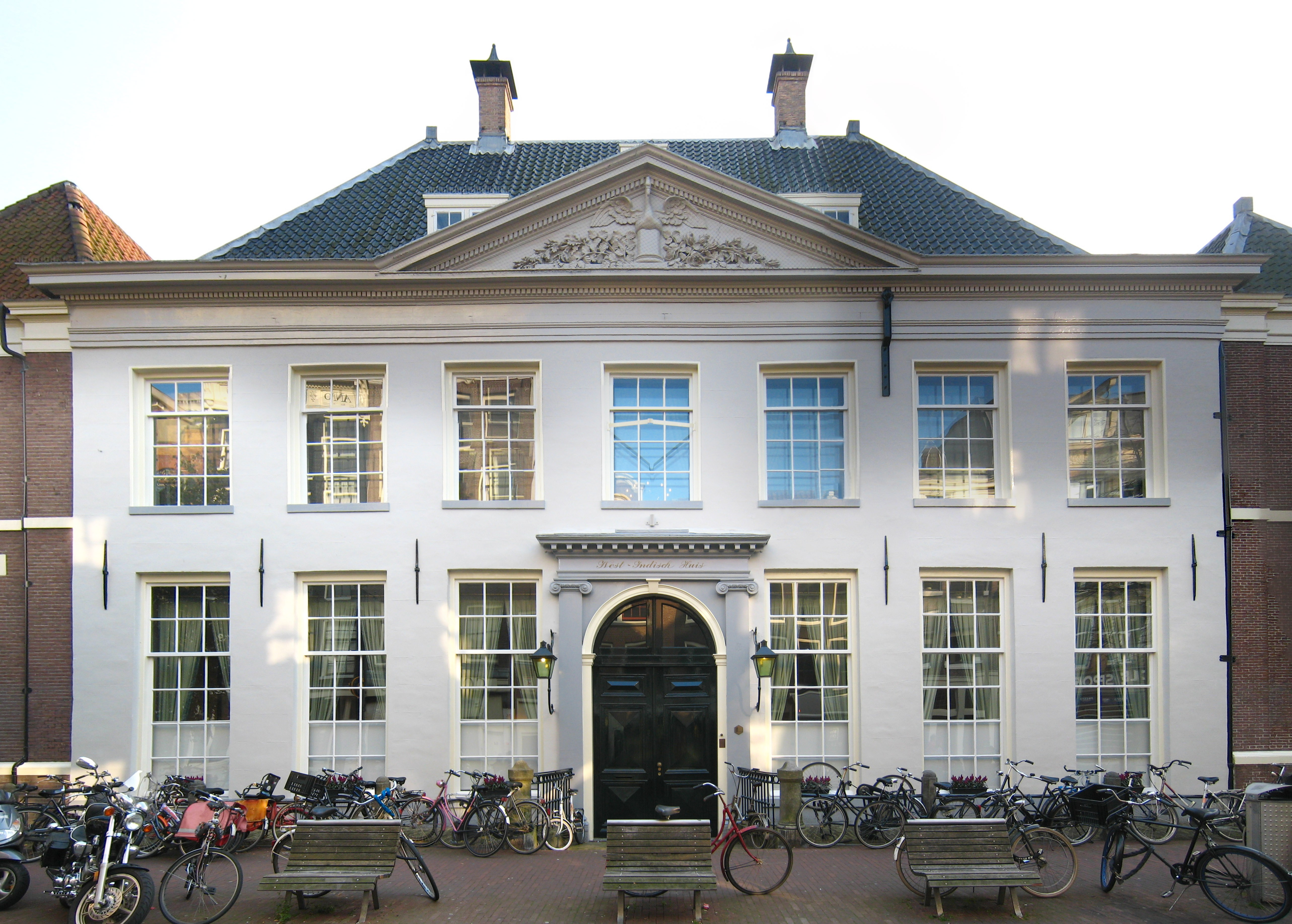
West-Indisch Huis, front

The West-Indisch Huis ("West India House") is the former headquarters of the Dutch West India Company in Amsterdam. In this building, the Dutch West India Company's governors in 1625 ordered the construction of a fort on the island of Manhattan, laying the foundations for New York City.

The West-Indisch Huis is located on the Herenmarkt, a small square between the Haarlemmerstraat and Brouwersgracht canal in the center of Amsterdam. The building has municipal monument status and is in use as office space and venue for conferences, weddings and other events. The John Adams Institute, which aims to further cultural exchange between The Netherlands and the U.S., is housed in the building.

== History ==
The building was constructed in 1617 as a meat market (on the ground floor) and waiting room for the local militia (on the upper floor). In 1623 it was rented by the Dutch West India Company, founded two years earlier, and was used until 1647 for meetings by the governing board of the Dutch West India Company. During this time the building was expanded with two wings around a central courtyard, tripling the size of the building. In 1647, the Dutch West India Company got into financial troubles and was forced to move to the West-Indisch Pakhuis, a Dutch West India Company warehouse on the IJ waterfront, which thereafter became known as the West-Indisch Huis.

From 1660 the building was in use as gentlemen's lodgings (a hotel) and in 1825 it became a home for orphans and the elderly. The building underwent renovations that included removal of the high front porch and plastering of the facade.

In 1975 a fire ravaged the building. The following year a foundation was set up to restore and manage the building. The restorations took place in the period 1978-1981, at a cost of 12 million guilders. In the courtyard, a fountain was placed with a bronze statue of Peter Stuyvesant, governor of New Netherland, the Dutch colony on the east coast of what is now the United States. Following renovation the building was allocated for elderly housing and taken into use as a municipal wedding hall.

== John Adams Institute ==
The John Adams Institute (Dutch: Stichting John Adams Instituut), which aims to further cultural exchange between The Netherlands and the U.S., is housed in the building. Founded in April 1987, it survives without Dutch government subsidy, relying on contributions, entrance fees, private donations, and Dutch and American corporate sponsors, and American Embassy Small Grants. The live event series American Literature Today interviews familiar authors, while American Focus present lecturers, scientists and other speakers who explore the broader aspects of American culture.

== Related buildings ==
The West-Indisch Pakhuis (West India Warehouse) in Amsterdam served as headquarters of the Dutch West India Company from 1647 until 1674. From 1674 to 1795, the company was headquartered at the Voetboogdoelen in Amsterdam, which was known as West-Indisch Huis during this period.

Other Dutch towns, including Dordrecht, also had (or still have) a West-Indisch Huis. These served as headquarters for the local chambers of the Dutch West India Company.

In addition to the West-Indisch Huis, Amsterdam also has an Oost-Indisch Huis ("East India House") which served as headquarters for the Dutch East India Company.

== Sources ==
- Vrienden van de Amsterdamse Binnenstad (Dutch)
- Gemeente Amsterdam, Stadsdeel Centrum: West-Indisch Huis (Dutch)
- Jaarboek van de Maatschappij der Nederlandse Letterkunde: Antonius Wilhelmus Coenraad Leonardus Koot (Dutch)
