= Athenaeum Illustre of Amsterdam =

Coordinates: 52°22′10″N 4°53′44″E

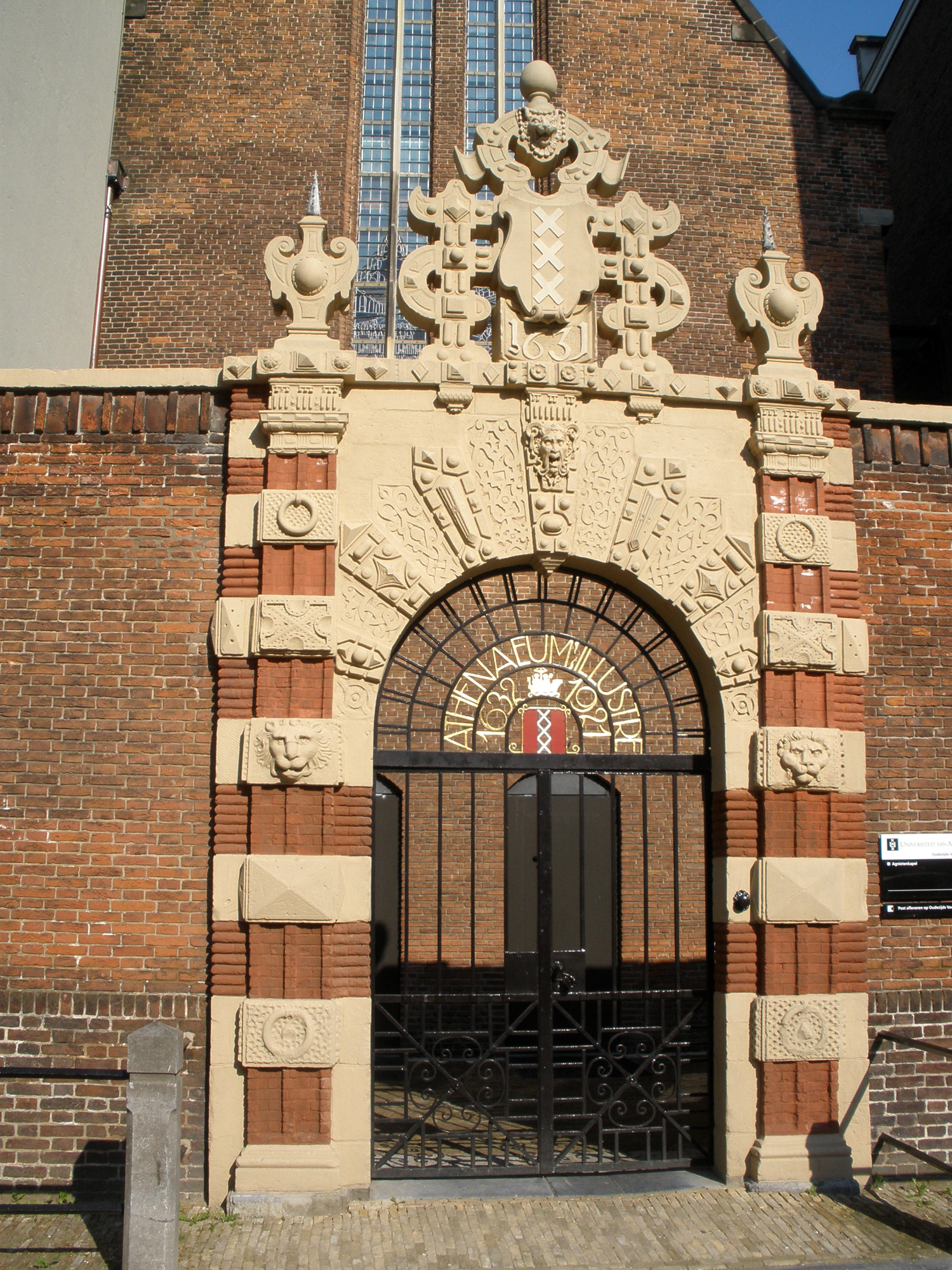
The Baroque gate of the Agnietenkapel, which was originally made in 1571, was moved here in 1631, and today has an iron gate attached that spells out "Athenaeum Illustre 1632-1921"

Athenaeum Illustre, or Amsterdamse Atheneum, was a city-sponsored 'illustrious school' founded after the beeldenstorm in the old Agnieten chapel on the Oudezijds Voorburgwal 231 in Amsterdam, Netherlands. Famous scientists such as Caspar Barlaeus, Gerardus Vossius, Martinus Hortensius, Alexander de Bie, and Petrus Camper taught here.

== History ==
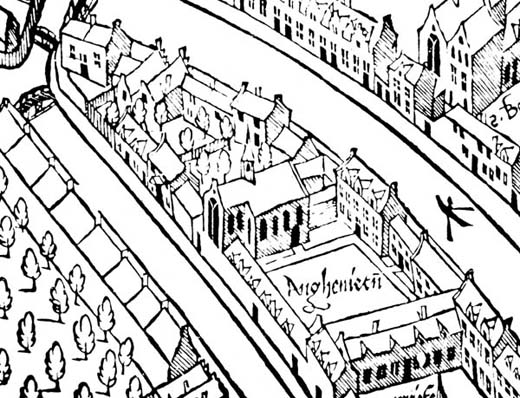
Detail of Cornelis Anthonisz' 1544 woodcut of Amsterdam, showing the "Agnieten" with the chapel.

The institution was founded despite the opposition by Protestant Remonstrants from Leiden University (but not by the Dutch Reformed Church), and because of this opposition it could not award degrees. It was anti-Aristotelian and some of its professors inclined to Cartesianism. It is known that rabbi Menasseh ben Israel, who promoted dialogue with Christians and helped organize debates at the Atheneum. Spinoza biographer Jonathan I. Israel contends that it is likely that Spinoza attended lectures and debates there as a young man.

The chapel is all that remains of the Agnietenklooster built in 1470, that was illustrated by Cornelis Anthonisz in 1544. It was remodelled in 1631 to become the Atheneaeum Illustre, which was the same year the old gate from 1571 was moved. Though it is considered the predecessor to the University of Amsterdam, it was not possible to earn a degree there and it wasn't lawfully recognized for diplomas until 1815. It wasn't until 1877 that it was recognized for doctorates, and that was the same year the name was changed to Gemeentelijke Universiteit van Amsterdam. Professors were appointed by the city council and the mayor of Amsterdam was chairman of the board. This situation remained in place until 1961, when the financial responsibility for the school reverted to the national ministry of education.

At the foundation of the Athenaeum Illustre, the City Library was moved to the attics of the Agnietenkapel and thus formed the origin of the present University Library.
