= Koningsplein =

Square in Amsterdam, Netherlands

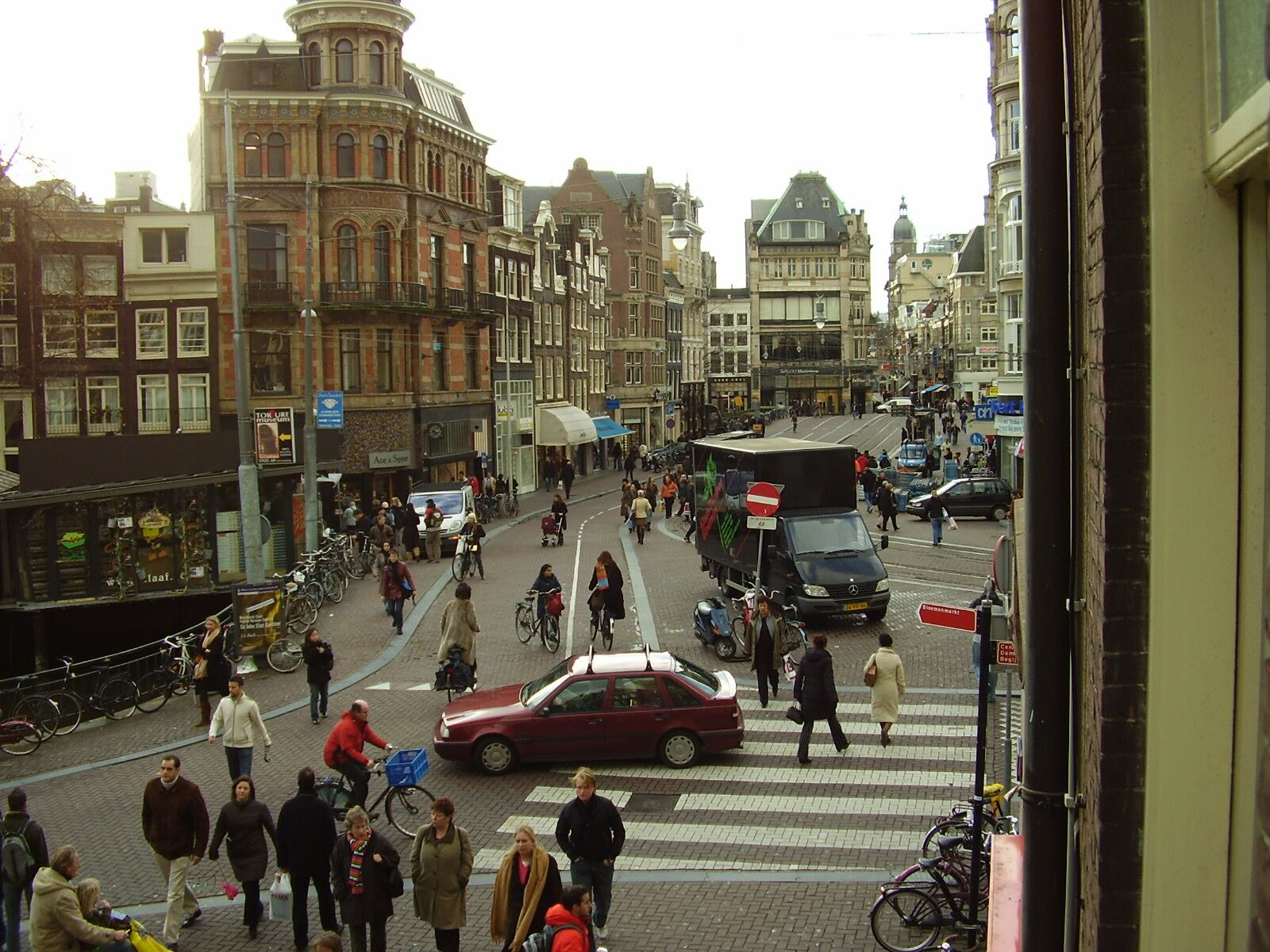
- Koningsplein in 2005

- Location within Amsterdam
- Namesake: King Henry IV of France
- Location: Centrum, Amsterdam, Netherlands
- Nearest metro station: Rokin
- Coordinates: 52°22′1″N 4°53′22″E

Koningsplein ('King's Square') is a square in Amsterdam. It is located between the Singel and Herengracht canals. It has become a meeting place for the local community.
