= Musician (disambiguation) =

A musician is anyone who plays a musical instrument or who composes, conducts, or performs music.

Musician may also refer to:

- Musician (magazine), a monthly music magazine which ran from 1976 to 1999
- "Musician" (song), by Porter Robinson, 2021
- Musician (video game), a 1980 video game
- A member of the Wagner Group

The Musician may refer to:

- Portrait of a Musician, by Leonardo da Vinci, sometimes referred to as the Musician
- The Musician (Bartholomeus van der Helst painting), a Dutch Golden Age painting
- The Musician, one of three figures from the 18th-century Jaquet-Droz automata
- The Musician (Tamara de Lempicka), a 1929 painting by Tamara de Lempicka

== See also ==
- Lists of musicians
