= List of paintings by Bartholomeus van der Helst =

The following is an incomplete list of paintings by Bartholomeus van der Helst that are generally accepted as autograph by Judith van Gent and other sources. The list is in order of creation, starting from his first dated work in 1637 for the regents of the Walloon Orphanage in Amsterdam. Most of his works are portraits, but he also made some allegories.

image	title	date	museum	accession number	measurements
	Regents of the Walloon Orphanage	1637	Regence Hospice Wallon, Amsterdam		oil on canvas, 133 x 147 cm
	Portrait of an unknown man, probably a preacher	1638	Museum Boijmans Van Beuningen	1293 (OK)	oil on canvas, 113 x 81 cm
	Officers and other members of the militia of district VIII in Amsterdam led by Captain Roelof Bicker and Lieutenant Jan Michielsz. Blaeuw	1639	Rijksmuseum; Amsterdam Museum	SK-C-375; SA 7327	oil on canvas, 235 x 750 cm
	Portrait of a Young Lady	1643	Glynn Vivian Art Gallery	GV 1974.63	oil on canvas, 162.5 x 129.5 cm
	Portrait of a Man	1642	Schloss Wilhelmshöhe, Kassel	GK 269	oil on canvas, 121.5 x 101 cm
	Portrait of Andries Bicker	1642	Rijksmuseum	SK-A-146	oil on panel, 93.5 x 70.5 cm
	Portrait of Catharina Jansdr. Tengnagel, wife of Andries Bicker	1642	Old Masters Gallery, Dresden	1595	oil on panel, 92.5 x 70 cm
	Portrait of Gerard Andriesz Bicker, son of Andries Bicker and lord of Muiden	1642	Rijksmuseum	SK-A-147	oil on panel, 94 x 70.5 cm
	Portrait of Roelof Bicker	1642	private collection		oil on panel, 71.5 x 60 cm
	Portrait of Dirck de Vlaming van Oudtshoorn	1642	private collection		oil on panel, 71 x 60 cm
	Portrait of the Burgermeester's Wife, Weyntgen van Bronckhorst	1642	private collection		oil on panel, 71 x 60 cm
	Portrait of David Rijckaert (1614–1680)	1643	private collection		oil on panel, 77 x 63 cm
	Portrait of a Lady (Berlin)	1643	Gemäldegalerie	825A	oil on panel, 75.5 x 62 cm
	Boy with a Spoon	1643	private collection		oil on canvas, 100 x 131 cm
	Portrait of a man, possibly Joan Hulft (1610–1677), with a dog, seated at a table with a clock	1644	Montreal Museum of Fine Arts	1595	oil on canvas, 165 x 133 cm
	Portrait of a Woman with a Child	1644	private collection		oil on canvas, 160 x 130.5 cm
	Portrait of a Man	1644	private collection		oil on panel, 113 x 70 cm
	Portrait of a Lady in Black Satin with a Fan	1644	National Gallery	NG1937	oil on panel, 104.6 x 76 cm
	Portrait of a Man	1644	private collection		oil on canvas, 77 x 65 cm
	Portrait of Wilhelm Vincent van Wyttenhorst	1644	Westphalian State Museum of Art and Cultural History		oil on panel, 46 x 35 cm
	A Boy as Cupid – 1644	1644	private collection		oil on canvas, 93 x 106 cm
	Portrait of Joan Coymans	1645	Chequers		oil on canvas, 74 x 64 cm
	Portrait of Sophia Trip, wife of Joan Coymans	1645	private collection		oil on canvas, 74 x 64 cm
	Portrait of a Man (Lille)	1645	Palais des Beaux-Arts de Lille	P252	oil on canvas, 78.4 x 65 cm
	Portrait of a Woman holding a Feather	1645	Palais des Beaux-Arts de Lille	255	oil on canvas, 78.4 x 65.8 cm
	Portrait of a seated young man holding gloves in his left hand	1645	private collection	inv.nr. 1515	oil on canvas, 127 x 99 cm
	Portrait of a Girl	1645	National Gallery	NG1248	oil on canvas, 75.4 x 65.3 cm
	A child's deathbed portrait	1645	Museum Gouda	NK2692	oil on canvas, 63 x 86.5 cm
	Portrait of a Man	1645-6	National Gallery in Prague	O-10870	oil on canvas, 100 x 82 cm
	Portrait of a Man, probably Willem Allertsz. Van Couwenhoven	1646	Museum Boijmans Van Beuningen	1294 (OK)	oil on canvas, 74.2 x 63.5 cm
	Portrait of a Woman	1646	Museum Boijmans Van Beuningen	1295 (OK)	oil on canvas, 74 x 63.4 cm
	Portrait of Samuel van Lansbergen (d 1669). Remonstrant minister in Rotterdam	1646	Rijksmuseum	SK-A-143	oil on panel, 68 x 58 cm
	Portrait of Maria Pietersdr de Leest (d 1652). Wife of Samuel van Lansbergen	1646	Rijksmuseum	SK-A-144	oil on panel, 68 x 58 cm
	Portrait of a Man	1645-7	private collection		oil on panel, 76 x 66 cm
	Portrait of a Man, perhaps Dammas Jansz. Pesser	1647	private collection		oval panel, 63 x 47 cm
	Portrait of a woman, perhaps Dorothea Adriaensdr. Keijser, wife of Dammas Jansz. Pesser	1647	private collection		oval panel, 63 x 47 cm
	Portrait of a Man	1647	Metropolitan Museum of Art	71.73	oval panel, 66.7 x 54.9 cm
	Portrait of Jacob Jacobsz. van Couwenhoven	1647	private collection		oval panel, 68.6 x 55.9 cm
	Portrait of Maritge Jansdr. Pesser	1647	National Gallery of Ireland		oval panel, 71.2 x 59.1 cm
	Portrait of Aechte Cornelisdr. Briel	1647	private collection		oil on panel, 68 x 56 cm
	Portrait of Cornelis Jansz. Hartigsvelt	1647	private collection		oil on panel, 70 x 58 cm
	Portrait of a Lady with a Fan	1647	Herzog Anton Ulrich-Museum		oil on canvas, 127 x 102 cm
	Banquet at the Crossbowmen’s Guild in Celebration of the Treaty of Münster	1648	Rijksmuseum; Amsterdam Museum	SK-C-2; SA 7328	oil on canvas, 232 x 547 cm
	Portrait of a Man	1648	Museum of Fine Arts, Budapest		oil on canvas, 108.5 x 88.5 cm
	Portrait of a Girl	1648	private collection		oil on panel, 73.5 x 59 cm
	Portrait of an Old Lady	1648	private collection		oil on panel, 64.5 x 54.5 cm
	Portrait of an Old Lady	c. 1648	private collection		oil on panel, 69.5 x 59 cm
	Portrait of a Woman	1649	Hermitage Museum	ГЭ-6833	oil on canvas, 70 x 60 cm
	Portrait of a Man in Black	1649	Bavarian State Painting Collections	7256	oil on canvas, 111 x 88.5 cm
	Portrait of a Lady	1649	Bavarian State Painting Collections	7262	oil on canvas, 111 x 88.5 cm
	Lady in Black	c. 1649	Kadriorg Art Museum	VM 907	oil on canvas, 97 x 82 cm
	Two regents and two regentesses of the Spinhuis	1650	Amsterdam Museum	SA 4367	oil on canvas, 233 x 317 cm
	Portrait of Willem Vincent Van Wyttenhorst	1650	private collection		oil on canvas, 82 x 66 cm
	Portrait of Wilhelmina Van Bronckhorst	1650	private collection		oil on canvas, 82 x 69 cm
	Portrait of a gentleman with white hair	1650	Virginia Museum of Fine Arts	71.10	oil on canvas, 76.1 x 65.6 cm
	Portrait of the Burgomeister's Wife	1650	Mellerstain House	BW	oil on canvas, 75 x 64 cm
	Portrait of an Officer	1650	Amsterdam Museum; Rijksmuseum	SA 7509; SK-C-142	oil on canvas, 75 x 64.5 cm
	Portrait of a Young Man in Military Costume	1650	J. Paul Getty Museum	70.PA.12	oil on canvas, 73.5 x 59 cm
	Portrait of Petrus Scriverius	1651	Museum De Lakenhal	S 1445	oil on canvas, 114.5 x 98.5 cm
	Portrait of a Man	1651	Statens Museum for Kunst	KMSsp444	oil on panel, 84.5 x 66.5 cm
	Portrait of a Lady	1651	Kunsthistorisches Museum	GG_6388	oil on panel, 86 x 67 cm
	Portrait of a Man	1651	Museum Narodowe, Poznan		oil on canvas, 102 x 87.5 cm
	Family Portrait	1647; 1652	Hermitage Museum	ГЭ-862	oil on canvas, 236 x 345 cm
	Family Portrait	1652	Hermitage Museum	ГЭ-860	oil on canvas, 187.5 x 226.5 cm
	Portrait of Mary Stuart, Princess of Orange, as Widow of William II	1652	Rijksmuseum	SK-A-142	oil on canvas, 199.5 x 170 cm
	Portrait of a Woman with a Curtain	1652	Old Masters Gallery, Dresden	1596	oil on canvas, 73 x 65.5 cm
	The Directors of the Crossbow Militia	1653	Amsterdam Museum; Rijksmuseum	SA 7329; SK-C-3	oil on canvas, 183 x 268 cm
	Portrait of Michiel Heusch	1653	Philadelphia Museum of Art	Cat. 495	oil on canvas, 129.5 x 111.8 cm
	Portrait of a Gentleman	1653	Museo de Arte de Ponce	60.0158	oil on canvas, 111.2 x 93.1 cm
	Family Portrait of Jochem van Aras with His Wife and Daughter	1654	The Wallace Collection	P110	oil on canvas, 169.5 x 197.5 cm
	Portrait of Abraham del Court and His Wife Maria de Kaersgieter	1654	Museum Boijmans Van Beuningen	1296 (OK)	oil on canvas, 172 x 146.5 cm
	Portrait of Paulus Potter	1654	Mauritshuis	54	oil on canvas, 101 x 93.6 cm
	Portrait of a Gentleman (hand on hip)	1654	Detroit Institute of Arts	25.216	oil on canvas, 90.2 x 73 cm
	Portrait of a Lady in White	1654	private collection		oil on canvas, 83.5 x 68.5 cm
	Portrait of a Girl with a Bunch of Grapes	1654	private collection		oil on canvas, 76.5 x 62.8 cm
	Four directors of the arquebusier's guild, Amsterdam, 1655	1655	Amsterdam Museum	SA 2101	oil on canvas, 171 x 283 cm
	Portrait of a gentleman, three-quarter-length, seated, before a balustrade	1655	private collection		oil on canvas, 111.5 x 97.5 cm
	Portrait of Maria van Arckel, three-quarter-length, seated, before a balustrade	1655	private collection		oil on canvas, 111.5 x 97.5 cm
	Portrait of a Man (pendant of INV 1334)	1655	Louvre	INV 1333	oil on canvas, 101 x 79 cm
	Portrait of a Woman (pendant of INV 1333)	1655	Louvre	INV 1334	oil on canvas, 100 x 79 cm
	Portrait of a Man (60.010)	1655	Rhode Island School of Design Museum	60.010	oil on canvas, 112 x 98 cm
	Portrait of a Woman (60.009)	1655	Rhode Island School of Design Museum	60.009	oil on canvas, 112 x 98 cm
	Jacobus Trip (1627–70). Armaments dealer of Amsterdam and Dordrecht	1655	Rijksmuseum; Amsterdam Museum	SK-A-1255; SB 5783	oil on canvas, 110 x 95 cm
	Portrait of a Lady	1655	Staatliche Kunstsammlungen Weimar		oil on canvas, 110 x 96 cm
	Portrait of a Man with Documents	1655	Thyssen-Bornemisza Museum	184 (1929.10)	oil on canvas, 100 x 86.3 cm
	Hand Fragments	c. 1656	Smith College Museum of Art		oil on canvas mounted on panel, left hand: 21.6 x 30.3 cm; right hand 21 x 25.1 cm
	The Directors of the Amsterdam Civic guard of St. George in 1656	1656	Amsterdam Museum	SA 7330	oil on canvas, 183 x 254 cm
	Family portrait of Rijcklof van Goens and Jacomine Bartolomeusdr. Rosegaard, their children Rijcklof and Volckert, and a servant	1656	Museum Boijmans Van Beuningen	lost – see JPK 1 (PK)	oil on canvas, 169 x 232 cm
	Portrait of a Woman (Städel)	1656	Städel	704	oil on panel, 73.5 x 59.8 cm
	Portrait of Louis De Geer the Younger 1622–1695, ironworks owner	1656	Nationalmuseum, Stockholm, Leufstasamlingen	NMLeu 21	oil on canvas, 110 x 91 cm
	Portrait of Jeanne Parmentier, 1634–1710, wife of Louis de Geer	1656	Nationalmuseum, Stockholm, Leufstasamlingen	NMLeu 22	oil on canvas, 110 x 91 cm
	Portrait of Emanuel De Geer, 1624–1692, brother of Louis de Geer, Jr.	1656	Nationalmuseum, Stockholm, Leufstasamlingen	NMLeu 23	oil on canvas, 110 x 75 cm
	Portrait of Captain Gideon de Wildt	1657	Museum of Fine Arts, Budapest	4316	oil on canvas, 135.8 x 119 cm
	Portrait of a Maria Smit	1657	Museum of Fine Arts of Lyon		oil on canvas, 135.5 x 118.5 cm
	Portrait of a Lady	1657	Art Gallery Johannesburg		oil on canvas, 132.5 x 111 cm
	Self-Portrait	1655	Toledo Museum of Art	1976.12	oil on canvas, 96.5 x 99 cm
	Portrait of a Boy holding a Silver Drinking Cup	1657	private collection		oil on canvas, 65.4 x 53.3 cm
	Portrait of an Officer	1657	Chequers		oil on canvas, 89 x 66 cm
	A Study of a Head	1657	Hermitage		oil on canvas, 66 x 57 cm
	Portrait of a Young Lady	1655–59	private collection		oil on canvas, 72.9 x 65.4 cm
	Portrait of a Man	c. 1657	private collection		oil on canvas, 115 x 95 cm
	Portrait of a Lady	c. 1657	private collection		oil on canvas, 115 x 95 cm
	Portrait of Cornelis Jansz. Witsen	1658	private collection		oil on canvas, 132 x 106.5 cm
	Portrait of Catharina Claesdr. Gaeff alias Lambertsdr. Opsy (1619–1698)	1658	Royal Museums of Fine Arts of Belgium	2942	oil on canvas, 134.5 x 109.5 cm
	Portrait of a Girl with a Bread-bun and a Dog	1658	private collection		oil on canvas, 117.8 x 95.9 cm
	A Nude Young Woman behind a Draped Curtain	1658	Louvre	RF 1984-8	oil on canvas, 123.5 x 96 cm
	Portrait of a boy playing golf by the shore	1659	private collection		oil on canvas, 112 x 84 cm
	Portrait of a Man of the Hinlopen family, possibly Jacob Fransz Hinlopen	1659	Twickel Castle		oil on canvas, 116.5 x 89.5 cm
	Portrait of a Young Man	1659	private collection		oil on canvas, 73.6 x 59.7 cm
	Portrait of a Woman	1659	Mauritshuis	569	oil on panel, 77 x 62.5 cm
	Portrait of a Man	1660	Mauritshuis	568	oil on panel, 77.2 x 62.5 cm
	Portrait of a Man	1660	Wawel Royal Castle, Krakow		oil on panel, 79.7 x 61 cm
	The Holy Family with John the Baptist	1660	Centraal Museum	2500	oil on canvas, 167.2 x 209.6 cm
	Portrait of Anna du Pire as Granida	1660	National Gallery in Prague		oil on canvas, 70 x 58.5 cm
	Self Portrait as Daifilo	1660	National Gallery in Prague	O-9324	oil on canvas, 72 x 61 cm
	Portrait of Joan Huydecoper	1660	private collection		oil on canvas, circa 120 x 101 cm
	Portrait of Sophia Coymans	1660–69	Royal Palace of Amsterdam		oil on canvas, 104 x 84 cm
	Portrait of a Man	1659	Statens Museum for Kunst	KMSsp443	oil on canvas, 97 x 78 cm
	Portrait of Egbert Meeuwsz Cortenaer (1600–65). Vice admiral, admiralty of the Maas, Rotterdam	1660	Rijksmuseum	SK-A-145	oil on panel, 68 x 59 cm
	Portrait of a Young Lady	1663	Mauritshuis	B483	oil on canvas, 78 x 67 cm
	Portrait of a Lady	c. 1660	private collection		oil on canvas, 68 x 58 cm
	Portrait of an unknown couple	1661	Staatliche Kunsthalle Karlsruhe	235	oil on canvas, 186 x 147.5 cm
	Portrait of Samuel de Marez	1661	private collection		oil on canvas
	Portrait of Margaretha Trip, wife of Samuel de Marez	1661	private collection		oil on canvas, 132 x 112 cm
	Portrait of a Woman, possibly Elisabeth, sister of Samuel de Marez	1662	private collection		oil on canvas, 108 x 90 cm
	Portrait of a Man as a Hunter	1660–62	private collection		oil on canvas, 133.2 x 106.6 cm
	The Musician	1662	Metropolitan Museum of Art	73.2	oil on canvas, 138.4 x 111.1 cm
	Portrait of Man	1662	Kunsthalle Hamburg	297	oil on canvas, 132.5 x 112 cm
	Portrait of a Man (Fitzwilliam)	1662	Fitzwilliam Museum	149	oil on canvas, 83.2 x 71.1 cm
	Portrait of a Man	1662	Hermitage Museum	ГЭ-6318	oil on canvas, 122 x 98 cm
	Portrait of Willem van der Zaan	1662	Kelvingrove Art Gallery and Museum	725	oil on canvas, 113 x 91.4 cm
	Portrait of a gentleman holding a feathered had in his right hand	1665	private collection		oil on canvas, 71.1 x 59.1 cm
	Portrait of a Man	1664	private collection		oil on canvas, 72.5 x 62 cm
	Portrait of a Man	1664	private collection		oil on canvas, 78 x 67 cm
	Portrait of a Man, 1664	1664	Royal Museums of Fine Arts of Belgium	205	oil on canvas, 98 x 84.5 cm
	Portrait of a Lady, 1664	1664	Royal Museums of Fine Arts of Belgium	206	oil on canvas, 98 x 82 cm
	Portrait of a woman as Venus with Paris' apple	1664	Palais des Beaux-Arts de Lille	253	oil on canvas, 106 x 86 cm
	Venus punishing Cupid	1665	private collection		oil on canvas, 116.5 x 88.5 cm
	Portrait of a Man with his Dogs	1665	private collection		oil on canvas, 116.8 x 98 cm
	Portrait of a Lady with a Falcon	1665	Schloss Weissenstein, Pommersfelden		oil on canvas, 119 x 98 cm
	Portrait of a Woman with a Book	1665	musée Magnin	1938E267bis	oil on canvas, 93.5 x 75.5 cm
	Portrait of a Young Man in a Breastplate	1665	private collection		oil on canvas, 76 x 64 cm
	Portrait of a Flute Player	1665	private collection		oil on canvas, 80 x 60 cm
	Woman in the Window	1665	Museum der bildenden Künste	1619	oil on canvas, 99 x 85 cm
	Homo Bulla: A Boy Blowing Bubbles in a Landscape	1665	New Orleans Museum of Art	95.189	oil on canvas, 81.3 x 73 cm
	Portrait of a young boy with a falcon	1665	private collection		oil on canvas, 77.5 x 69.8 cm
	Portrait of Jan Jacobsz. Hinlopen (1626–1666) and Lucia Wijbrants (1638–1719) with to the left a vista showing a wet nurse and child	1666	private collection		oil on canvas, 134 x 161 cm
	Nieuwmarkt in Amsterdam	1666	Hermitage Museum	ГЭ-867	oil on canvas, 201 x 220 cm
	Self-portrait (Uffizi version)	1667	Uffizi	1638	oil on canvas, 85 x 76 cm
	Self-portrait (Warsaw version)	1667	National Museum in Warsaw	M.Ob.492 (128998)	oil on canvas
	Portrait of Johan de Liefde (c 1619–73), Vice admiral	1668	Rijksmuseum	SK-A-832	oil on canvas, 139 x 122 cm
	Portrait of Aert van Nes (1626–93), Vice admiral	1668	Rijksmuseum	SK-A-140	oil on canvas, 139 x 125 cm
	Portrait of Geertruida den Dubbelde (1647–84), wife of Aert van Nes	1668	Rijksmuseum	SK-A-141	oil on canvas, 139 x 125 cm
	Portrait of a Man, possibly Louis Trip	1668	private collection		oil on canvas, 127.4 x 102.7 cm
	Portrait of a Lady, possibly Ermgaard Emerantia Hoefslager	1668	private collection		oil on canvas, 127 x 102.6 cm
	Portrait of the Reepmaker Family	1669	Louvre	RF 2129	oil on canvas, 193 x 145 cm
	Portrait of Daniel Bernard	1669	Amsterdam Museum; Museum Boijmans Van Beuningen	402; 1297 (OK)	oil on canvas, 124 x 113 cm
	Portrait of a Man tying his Knee Stocking	1670	Pushkin Museum		oil on canvas, 166 x 138 cm
	Portrait of a Lady with a Sunflower	1670	private collection		oil on canvas, 100 x 75 cm

== Sources ==
- Bartolomeus van der Helst, proefschrift Leiden University 1921, by J.J. de Gelder, 1921
- Bartholomeus van der Helst (ca. 1613–1670). Een studie naar zijn leven en werk, by Judith van Gent, Waanders, Zwolle, 2011
- Bartolomeus van der Helst in the RKD
