= Goblet holder =

Type of ceremonial wine glass extender

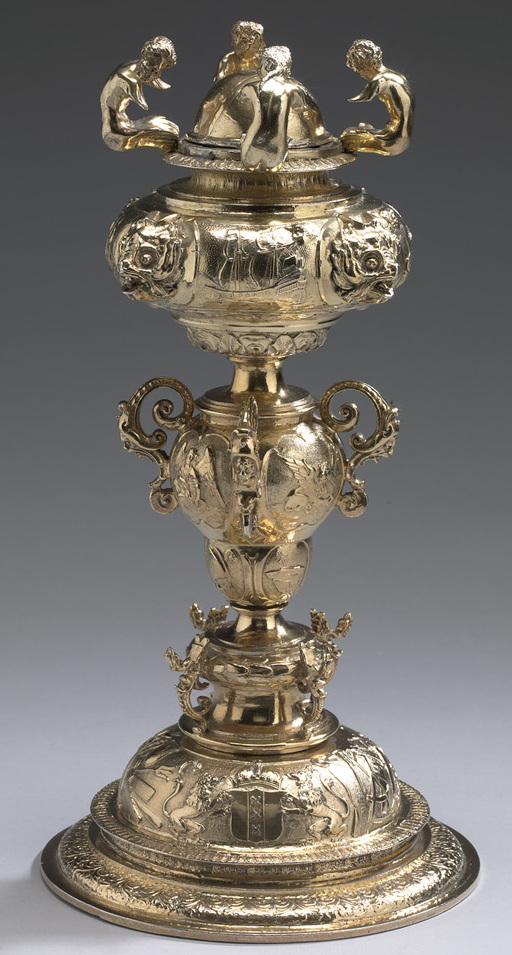
A silver-gilt bekerschroef; 1 of 5 with the coat of arms of the city of Amsterdam, Amsterdam Museum

A goblet holder, or Bekerschroef, is a specific type of wine glass extender used for ceremonial occasions in the Netherlands during the 16th and 17th centuries.

Many Dutch group portraits of guilds feature members holding one with a wine glass or rummer, in it. They were also often featured in still-life paintings, possibly to commemorate the banquet or feast of the holder.

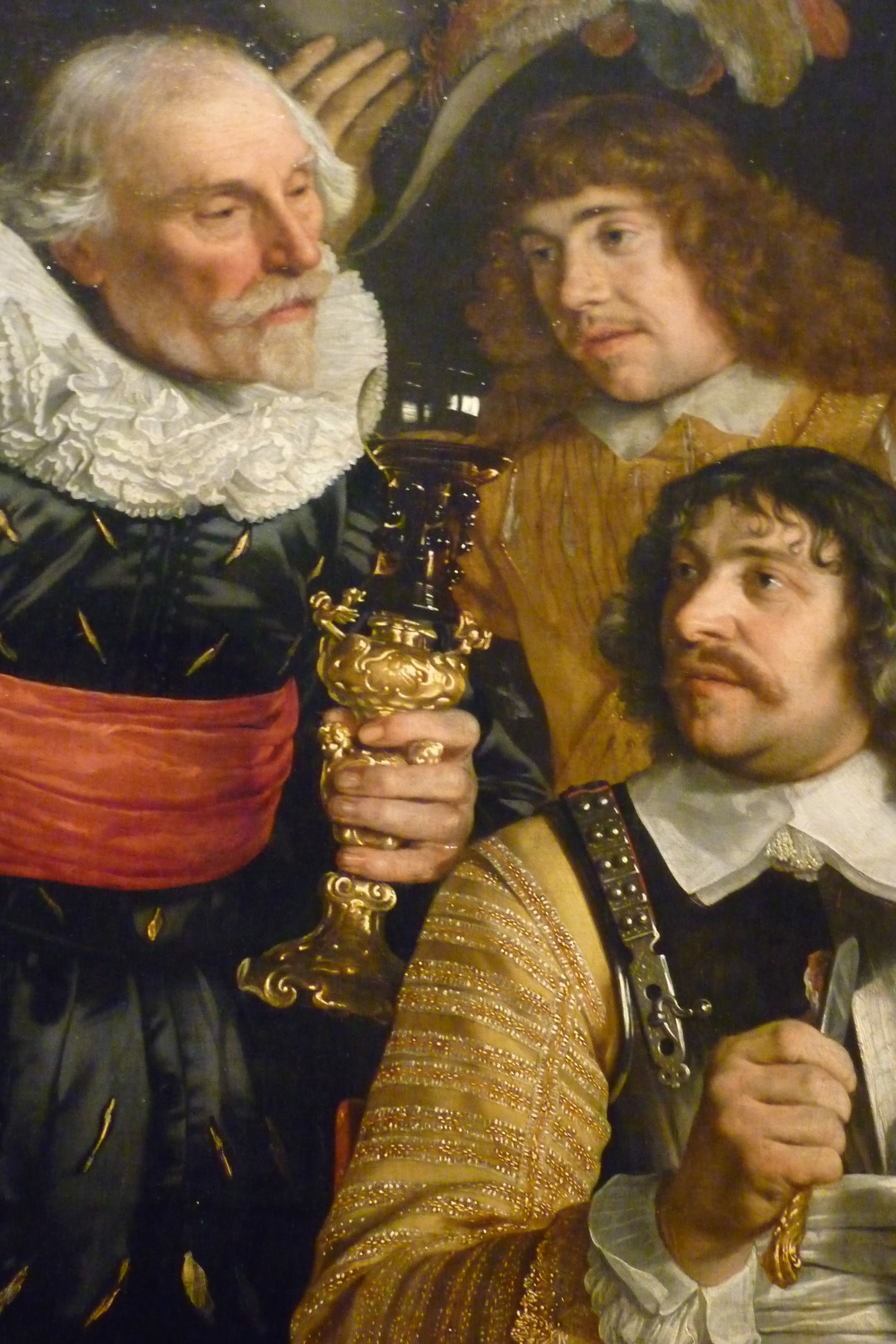
Detail from Banquet of the Amsterdam Civic Guard in Celebration of the Peace of Münster

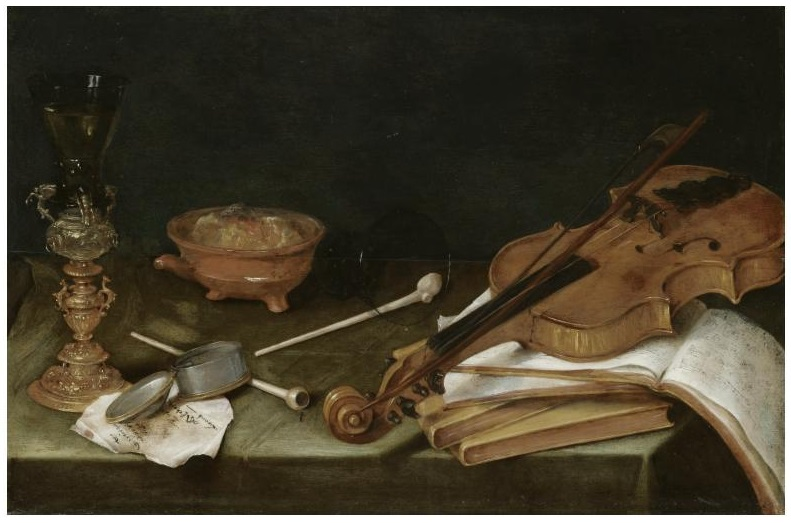
Vanitas with the Five Senses, by Pieter Claesz
