= Banquet of the Amsterdam Civic Guard in Celebration of the Peace of Münster =

1648 painting by Bartholomeus van der Helst

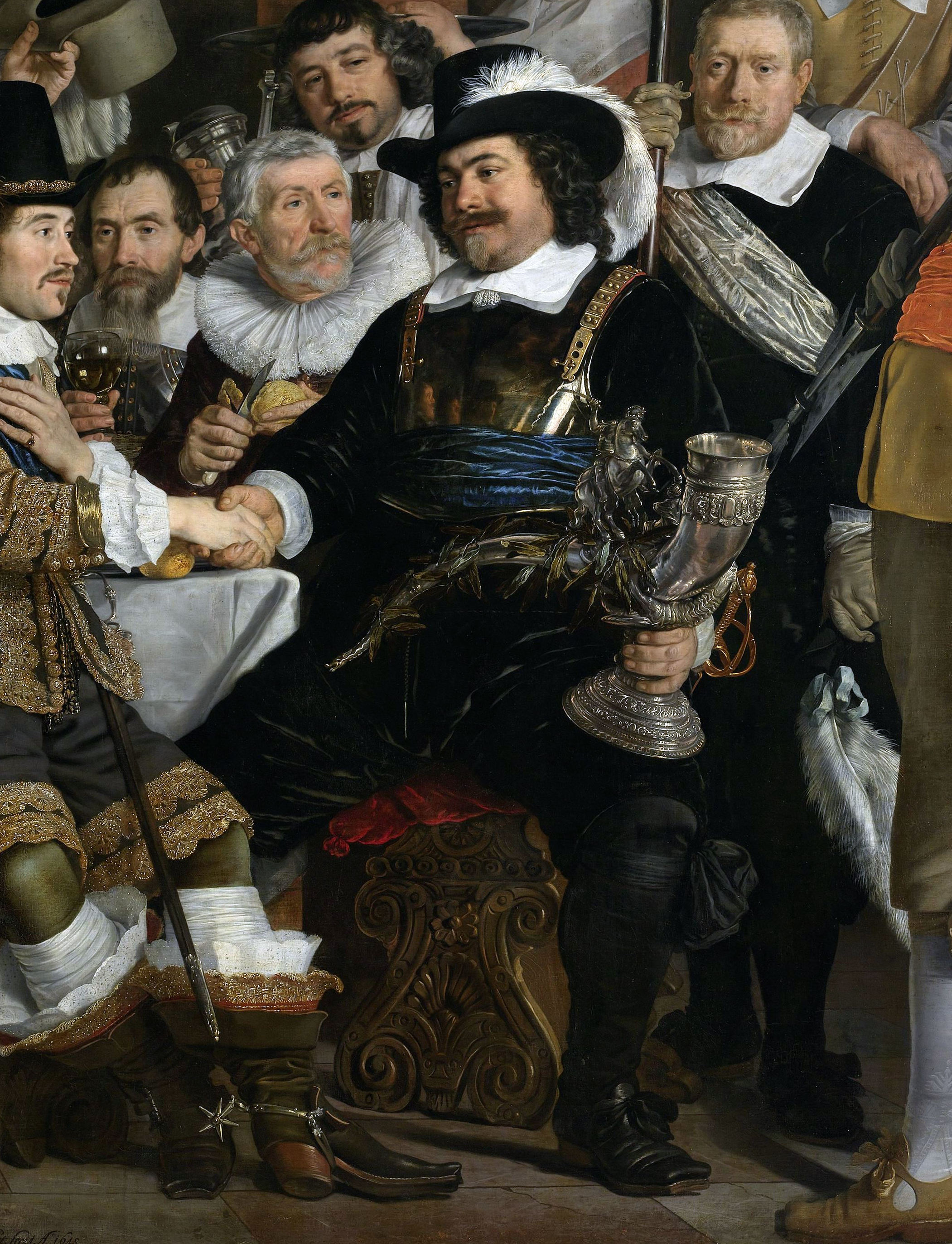
- Cornelis Witsen, heading the table and holding a guild cup, shakes Johan van Waveren's hand for peace
- Artist: Bartholomeus van der Helst
- Year: 1648
- Dimensions: 232 cm × 547 cm (91 in × 215 in)
- Location: Rijksmuseum, Amsterdam
- Accession: SK-C-2 / SA 7378
- Website: Rijksmuseum Amsterdam Museum

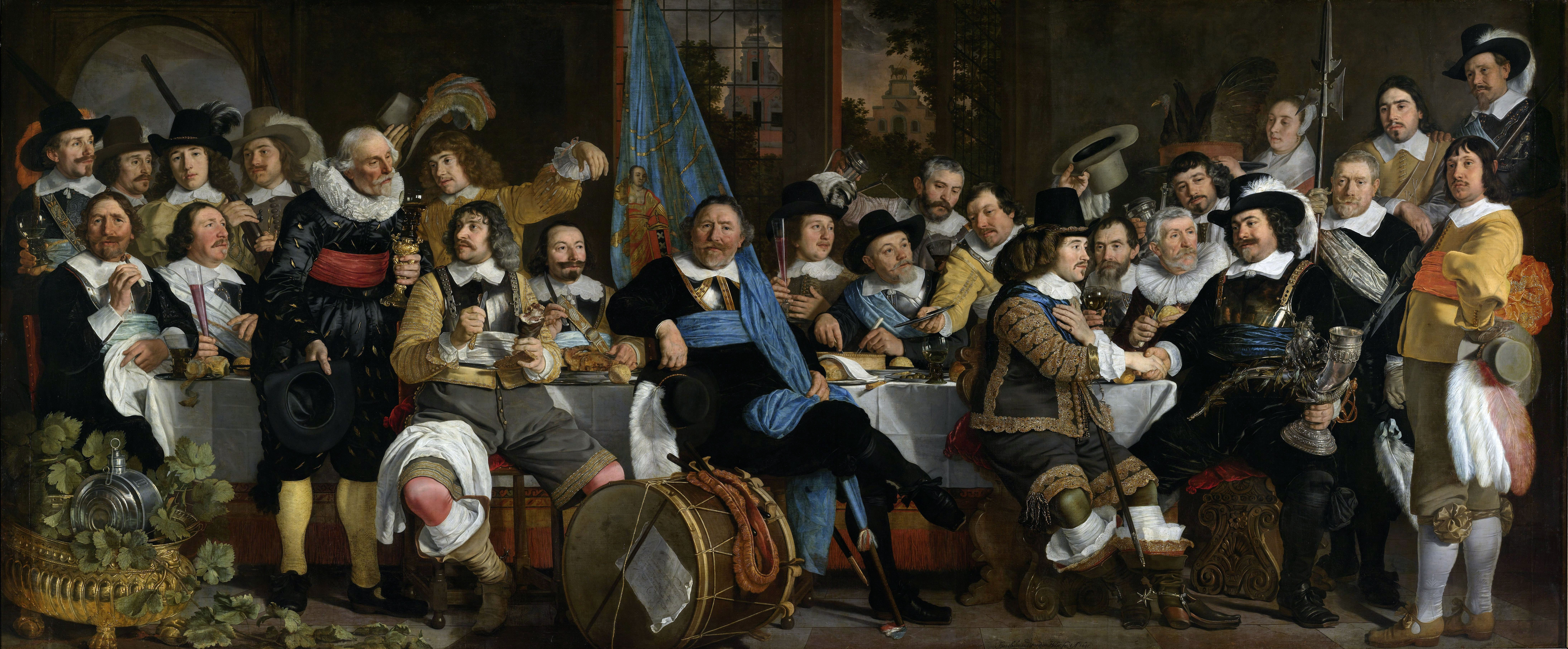
Painted life sized to fill a wall, 2.32 x 5.47 meters

Banquet of the Amsterdam Civic Guard in Celebration of the Peace of Münster (1648) is a group portrait oil painting by the Dutch painter Bartholomeus van der Helst. It is an example of Dutch Golden Age painting and is considered one of the highlights of the Amsterdam Museum, though it is generally on show in the Rijksmuseum.

The painting is one of the largest civic guard group portraits for which most of the sitters are known and most of the portrayed objects have survived.

The painting is about retiring from active duty, because the Peace of Münster had finally been signed after years of negotiations. The main figures are seen with the attributes of the civic guard guilds. On the right Cornelis Jan Witsen heads up the table, holding the silver drinking horn of the Voetboogdoelen, Amsterdam.

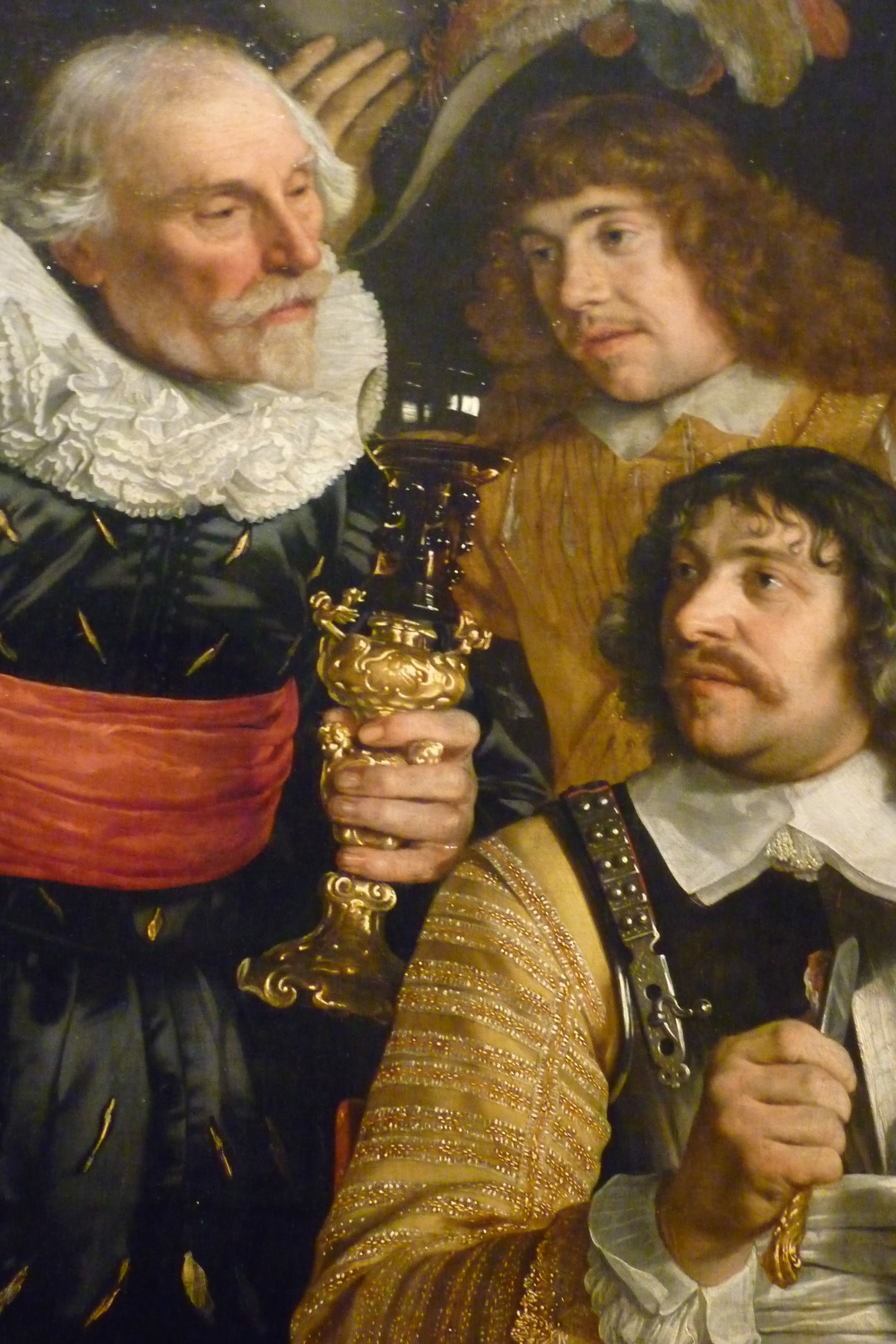
The "bekerschroef" or wineglass holder, is one of five still in the collection of the city of Amsterdam

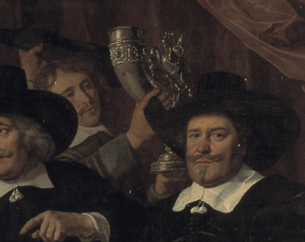
The silver drinking horn was painted by van der Helst again in 1656 when he painted the directors of the Voetboogdoelen

The art historian J.J. de Gelder mentioned the painting is dated 1648 but was probably finished at least a year later, similar to the way other group portraits by van der Helst bear the date of the commission and not of completion. The drum explains the occasion by way of the poem attached to it by Jan Vos. The names mentioned in the poem are the handshakers, but in 1680 a name board was added that included 24 names:

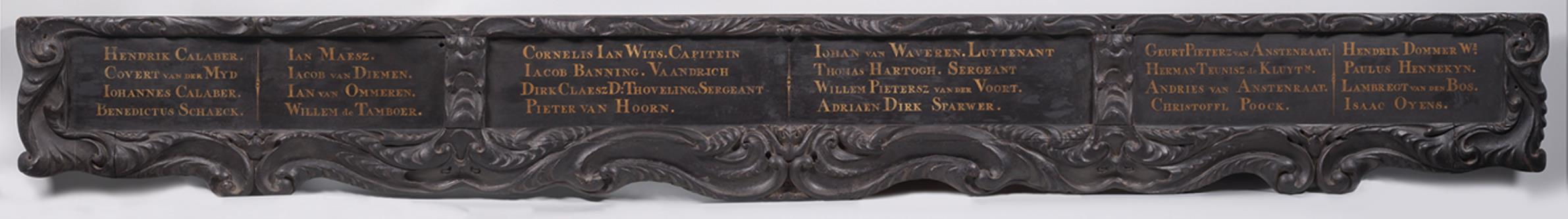

Column 1	Column 2	Column 3	Column 4	Column 5	Column 6
Hendrik Caliber	Jan Maesz	Cornelis Jan Witsen, Captain	Johan van Waveren, Lieutenant	Geurt Pieter van Anntenraat	Hendrik Dommer Wz
Govert van der Mij	Jacob van Diemen	Jacob Banning, Ensign	Thomas Hartog, Sargeant	Herman Theunisz. de Kluyter	Paulus Hennekyn
Johannes Caliber	Jan van Ommeren	Dirck Claesz Thoveling, Sargeant	Willem Pietersz. van der Voort	Andries van Anntenraat	Lambert van den Bos
Benedictus Schaeck	Willem de Tamboer	Pieter van Hoorn	Adriaen Dirck Sparwer	Christoffel Poock	Isaac Oyens

The art historian Judith van Gent remarked that the first name on this list was Hendrik Caliber who was buried a month after the festivities took place, and agrees with De Gelder that the painting took quite a while to create and assumes the commission probably was granted well before the summer of 1648. In her catalog entry for this painting she lists short biographies of the traceable names.

== See also ==
- List of paintings by Bartholomeus van der Helst
