= Musician (video game) =

1980 video game

- Developer: Philips
- Publisher: Philips
- Designer: Jon Shuttleworth
- Programmer: Peter van Twist
- Platform: Philips Videopac G7000
- Release: PAL: 1981
- Genre: Music

Musician is cartridge number 31 in the official Magnavox/Philips line of games for the Philips Videopac. It came in a cardboard box roughly double the size of a standard Videopac game box, containing a keyboard overlay in the style of a piano keyboard; the cartridge, in a standard Videopac box with a single sheet where the manual would usually be; and a landscape format manual, over double the size of a standard game manual.

The purpose of the set is to turn the user's Videopac into a musical keyboard. It supports recording and editing sequences of up to 81 notes, although there is no way to save apart from writing a composition down on music manuscript. In the manual there are the following pieces of sheet music:

- "Badinerie" (Bach)
- "Brother Jacob"
- "The Entertainer"
- "Eurovision Tune"
- "Happy Birthday to You"
- "Liebestraum" (Liszt)
- "Lightly Row"
- "Merrily We Roll Along"
- "Michael Row the Boat Ashore"
- "Mosocow Night"
- "Old McDonald Had a Farm"
- "This Old Man"
- "Three Young Drummers"
- "Twinkle Twinkle Little Star"
