= The Musician (Bartholomeus van der Helst painting) =

1662 painting by Bartholomeus van der Helst

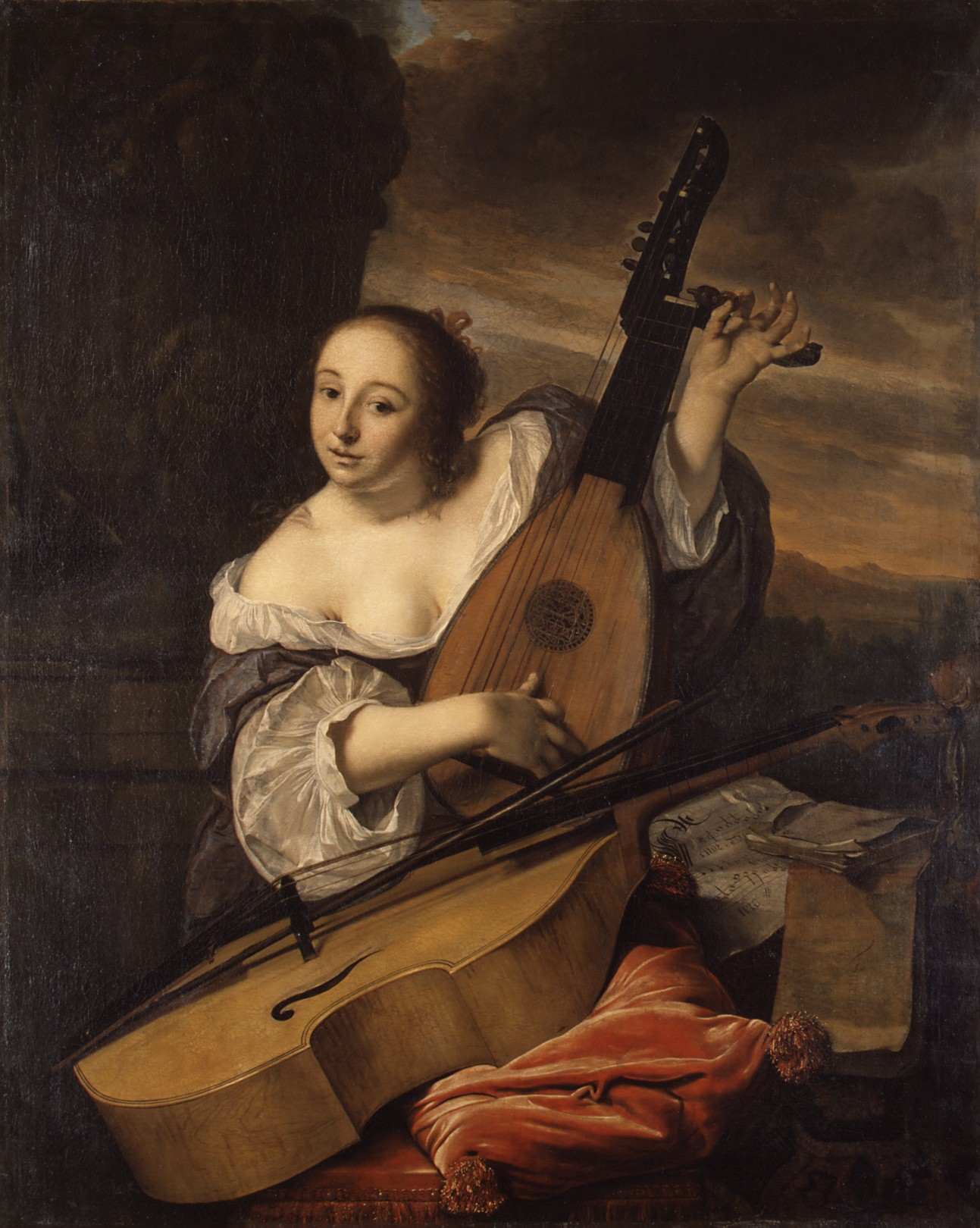
- Artist: Bartholomeus van der Helst
- Year: 1662
- Medium: oil paint, canvas
- Dimensions: 138.4 cm (54.5 in) × 111.1 cm (43.7 in)
- Location: Metropolitan Museum of Art
- Accession no.: 73.2
- Identifiers: The Met object ID: 436642

The Musician (1662) is an oil on canvas painting by the Dutch painter Bartholomeus van der Helst. It is an example of Dutch Golden Age painting and is part of the collection of the Metropolitan Museum of Art.

The woman is looking at the viewer and according to art historian Walter Liedtke, "spills out of her dress". Liedtke goes on to make this a case for considering it a genre work rather than a portrait, comparing it with other scantily clad lute players that may have influenced the painter, such as the earlier works of Gerrit van Honthorst and contemporary work such as by Ferdinand Bol:

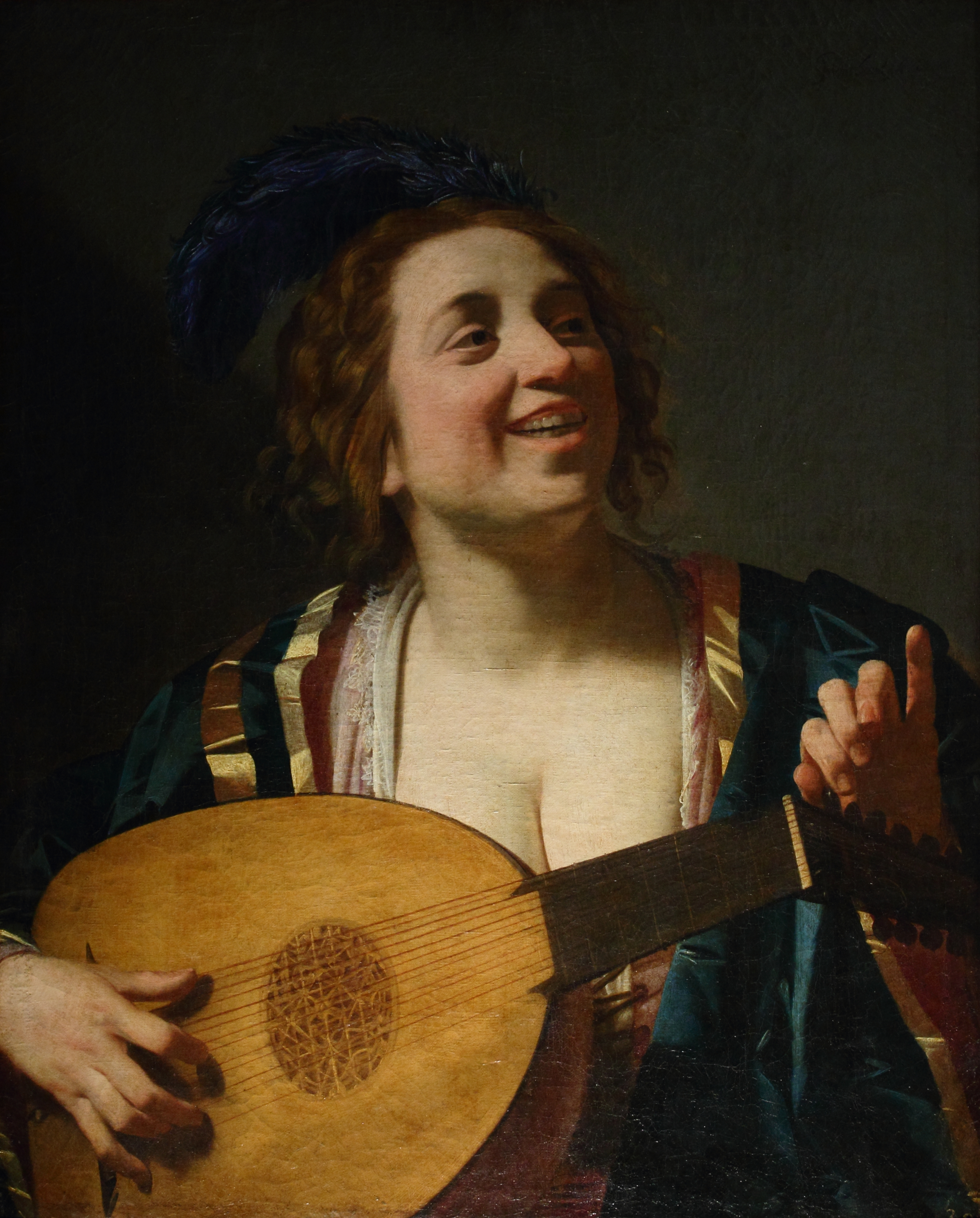
Honthorst, 1624

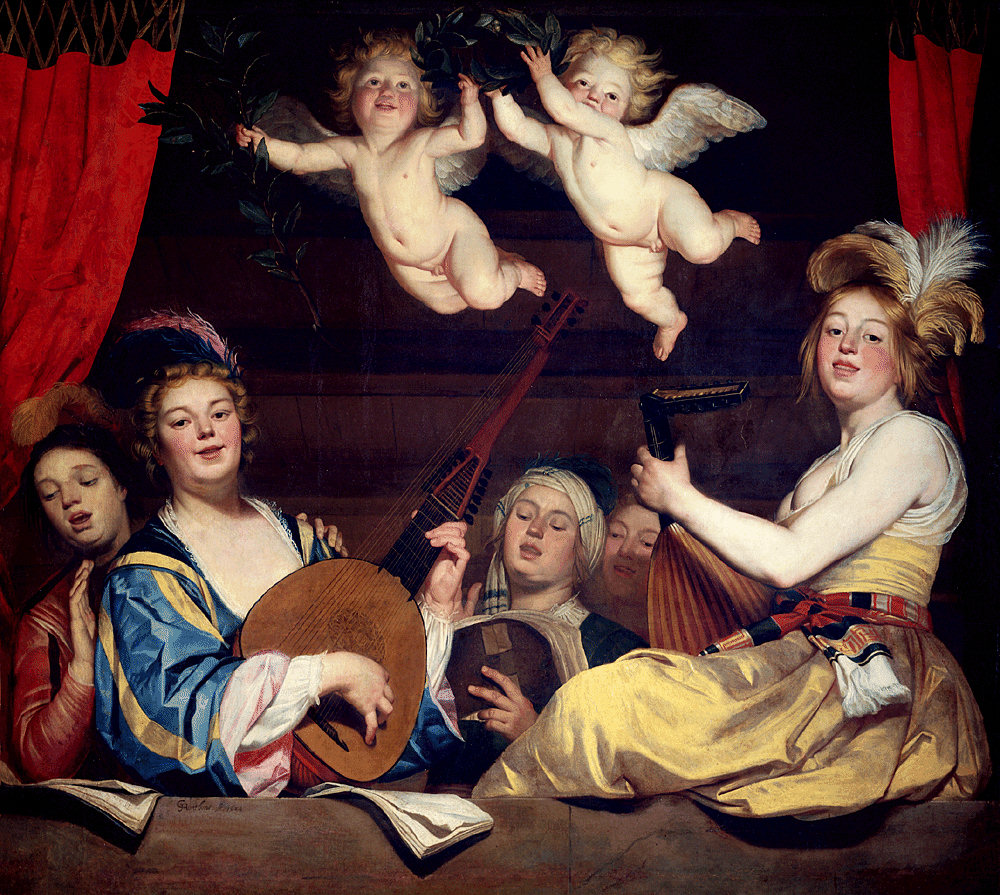
Honthorst, 1624

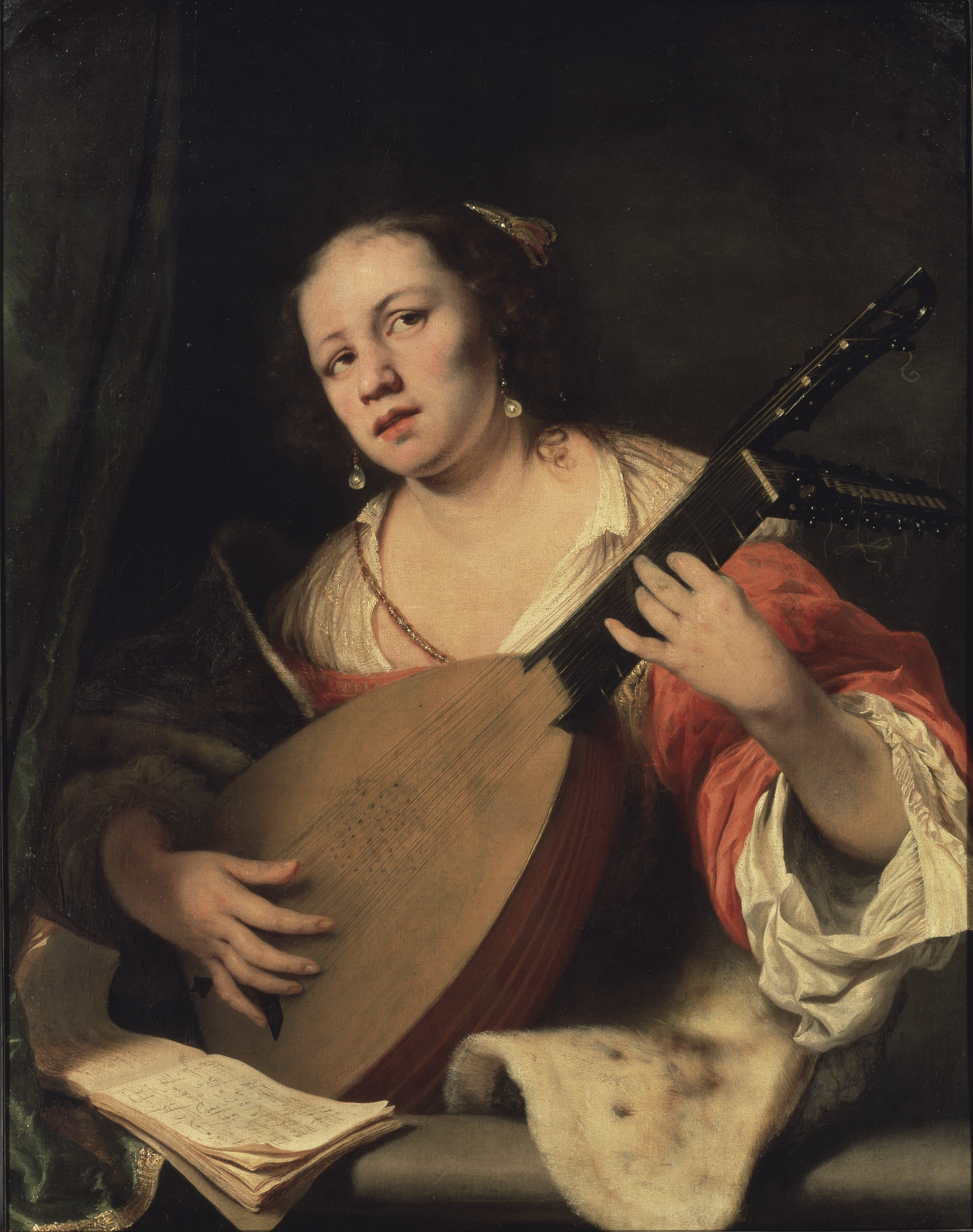
Bol, 1654

Liedtke wonders if it could possibly a portrait of the artist's wife, as has sometimes been claimed for the female pendant of a shepherd by Van der Helst that has often been claimed to be a self-portrait:

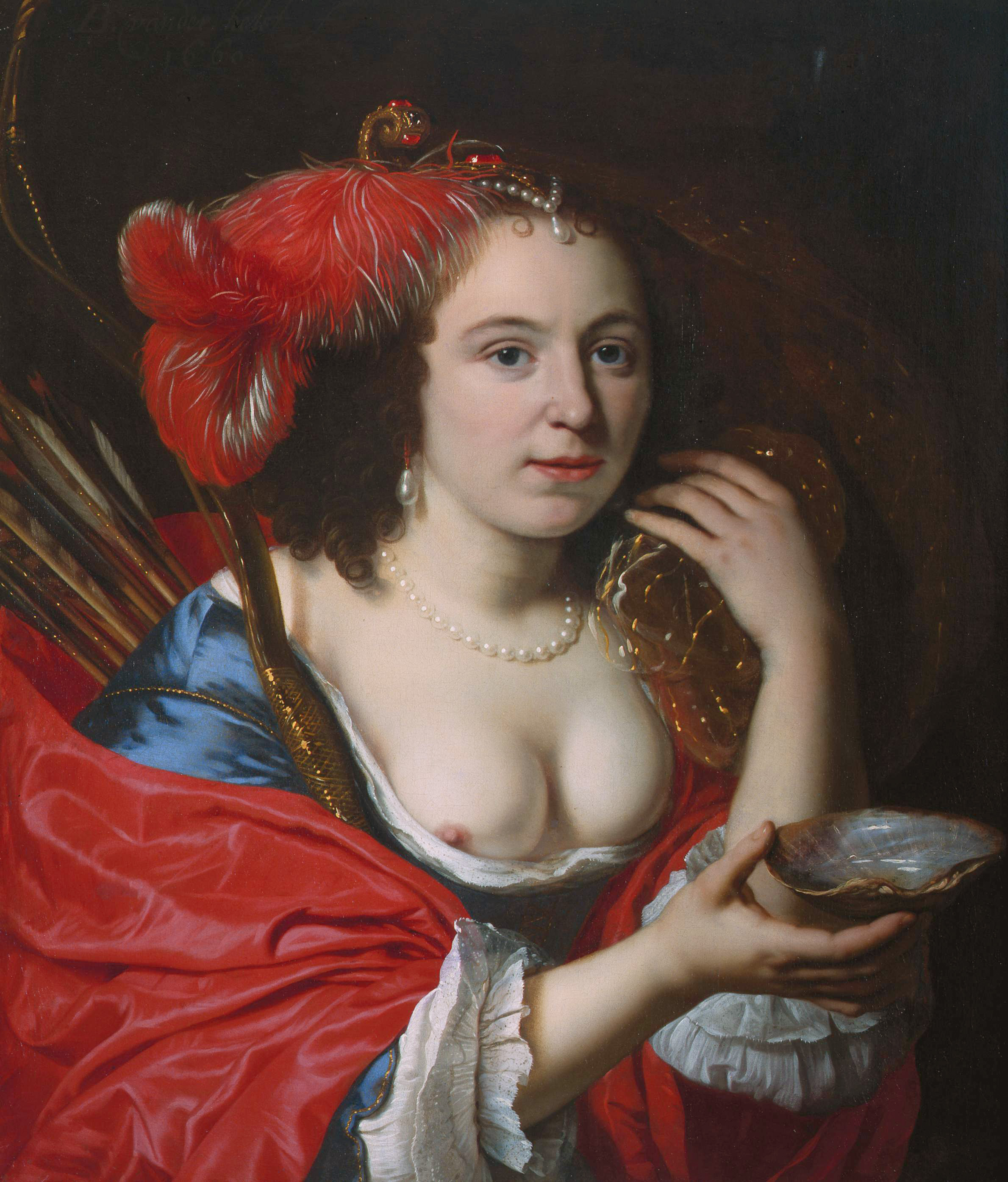
Unknown woman as Granida, 1660

This work is the only surviving painting in the Metropolitan Museum of Art that was acquired before 1906 and after the initial purchase of 1871, and though it is officially recorded as entering the collection in 1873, Liedtke mentions that it was grouped as one of two paintings that came into the collection in 1872 after the initial 1871 purchase, but also via the same vice-president of the Board of Trustees William T. Blodgett and presumably therefore via his dealer Leon Gauchez. The other painting (accession number 73.1) was a double portrait by Carel de Moor, but it was deaccessioned in 1988.

The art historian J.J. de Gelder mentioned the lute shown in the painting is a theorbe and it rests on a viola de gamba. He found the landscape reminiscent of Jan Baptist Weenix. The van der Helst scholar Judith van Gent dismisses both this painting and the Granida as a portrait of the artist's wife Anna du Pire based on the age of the painter and his wife at the time. She notes Liedtke's comparison to the other Dutch lute players in the Met collection, namely Vermeer's Woman with a Lute, where the woman is also tuning the lute, and Gerard ter Borch's A Woman Playing the Theorbo-Lute and a Cavalier. She wonders whether the act of tuning a lute used to have a meaning that is now lost on us.

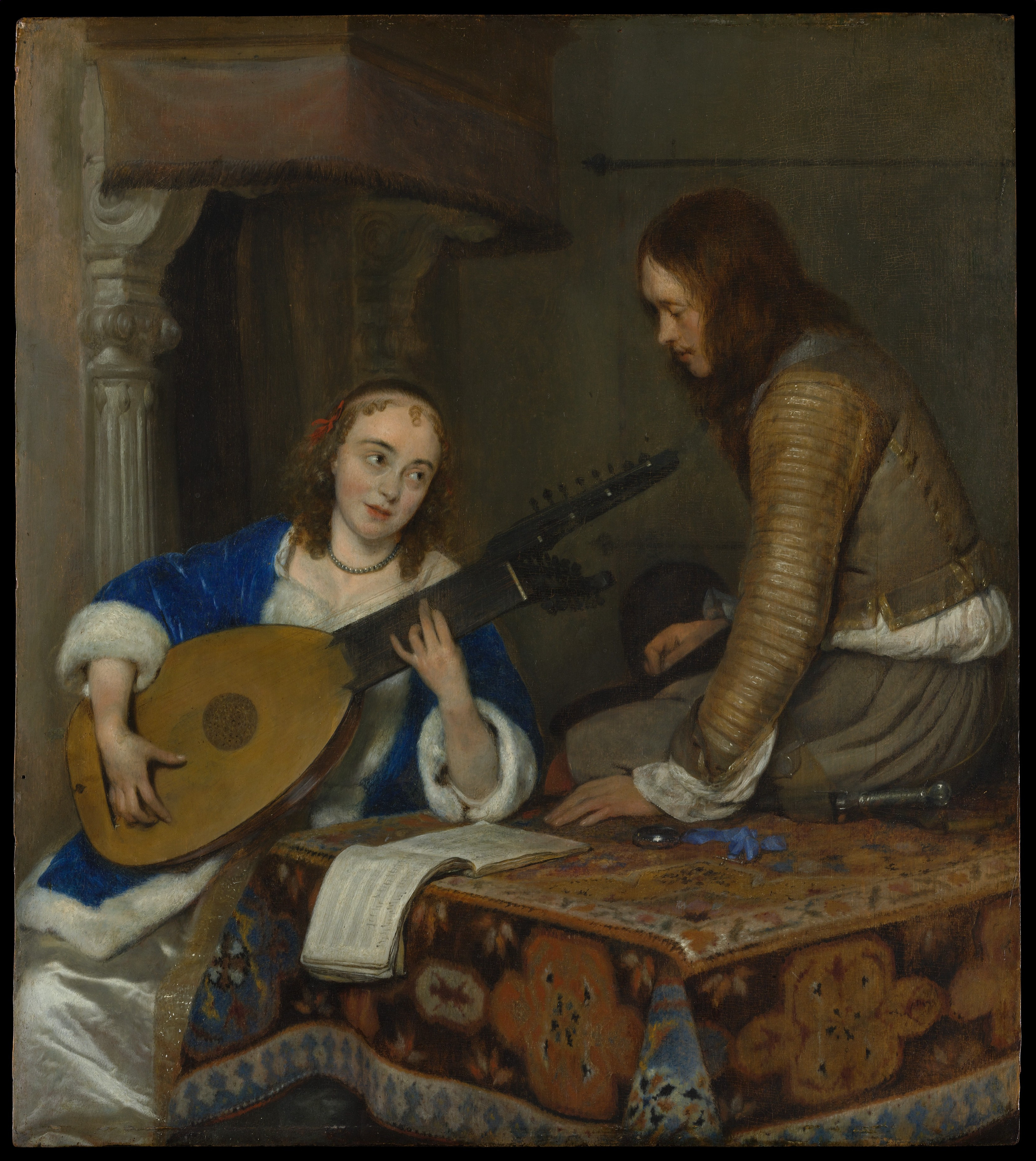
Ter Borch, 1658

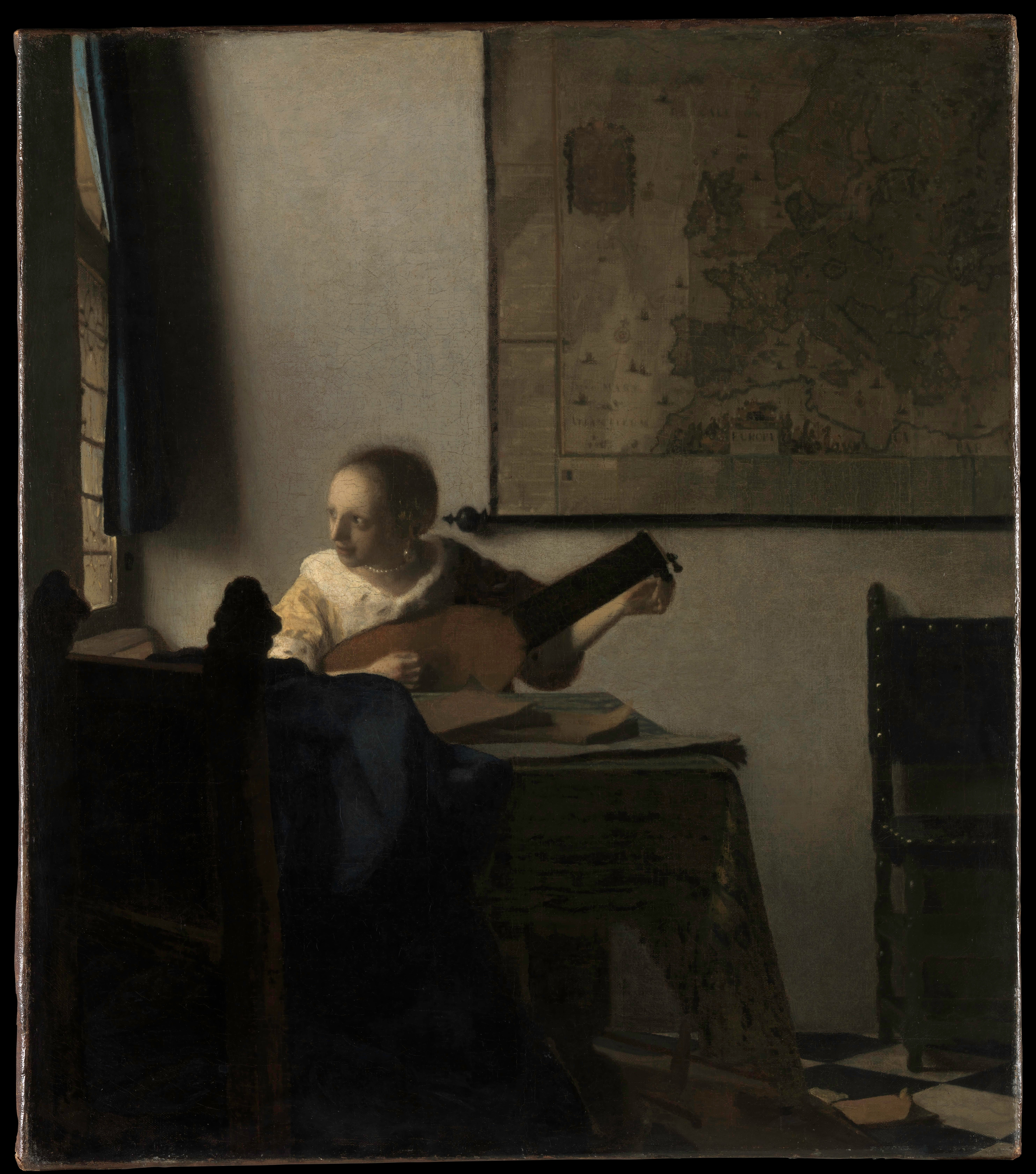
Vermeer, 1662

The Vermeer was donated to the Met's collection in 1900, and the ter Borch in 1914, both of which had been recently imported to the US, probably also based on the popularity at the time of this painting.

== See also ==
- List of paintings by Bartholomeus van der Helst
