= Bartholomeus van der Helst =

Dutch painter (1613–1670)

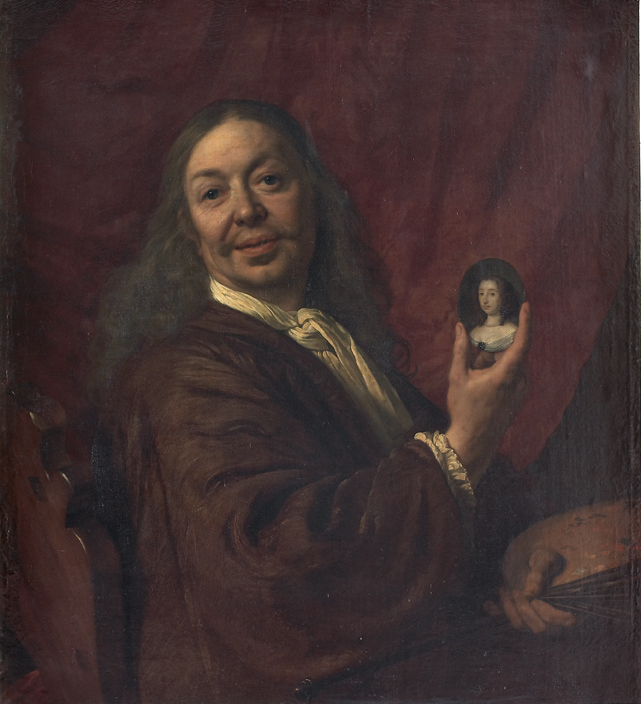
- Self-portrait with a miniature of Mary, Princess Royal, 1667
- Born: 1613, Haarlem
- Died: 1670 (buried 16 December), Amsterdam
- Known for: Portrait painting
- Notable work: Banquet of the Amsterdam Civic Guard in Celebration of the Peace of Münster
- Movement: Dutch Golden Age painting
- Patrons: Mary, Princess Royal and Princess of Orange, Amsterdam regency and guild-directors

Bartholomeus van der Helst (1613 – buried 16 December 1670) was a Dutch painter. Considered to be one of the leading portrait painters of the Dutch Golden Age, his elegant portraits gained him the patronage of Amsterdam's elite as well as the Stadtholder's circle. Besides portraits, van der Helst painted a few genre pictures as well as some biblical scenes and mythological subjects.

== Life ==
Bartholomeus van der Helst was born in Haarlem in 1613. His exact date of birth is not known as the birth records of Haarlem of that time are lost. He was the son of a Haarlem innkeeper called Lodewijk and Lodewijk's second wife, Aeltgen Bartels. Van der Helst had moved to Amsterdam some time before 1636, the year in which he married Anna du Pire, an 18-year-old woman from a prosperous family of the Southern Netherlands who was already orphaned. The couple had six children of whom one, called Lodewijk (1642 - c. 1684), became a portrait painter like his father.

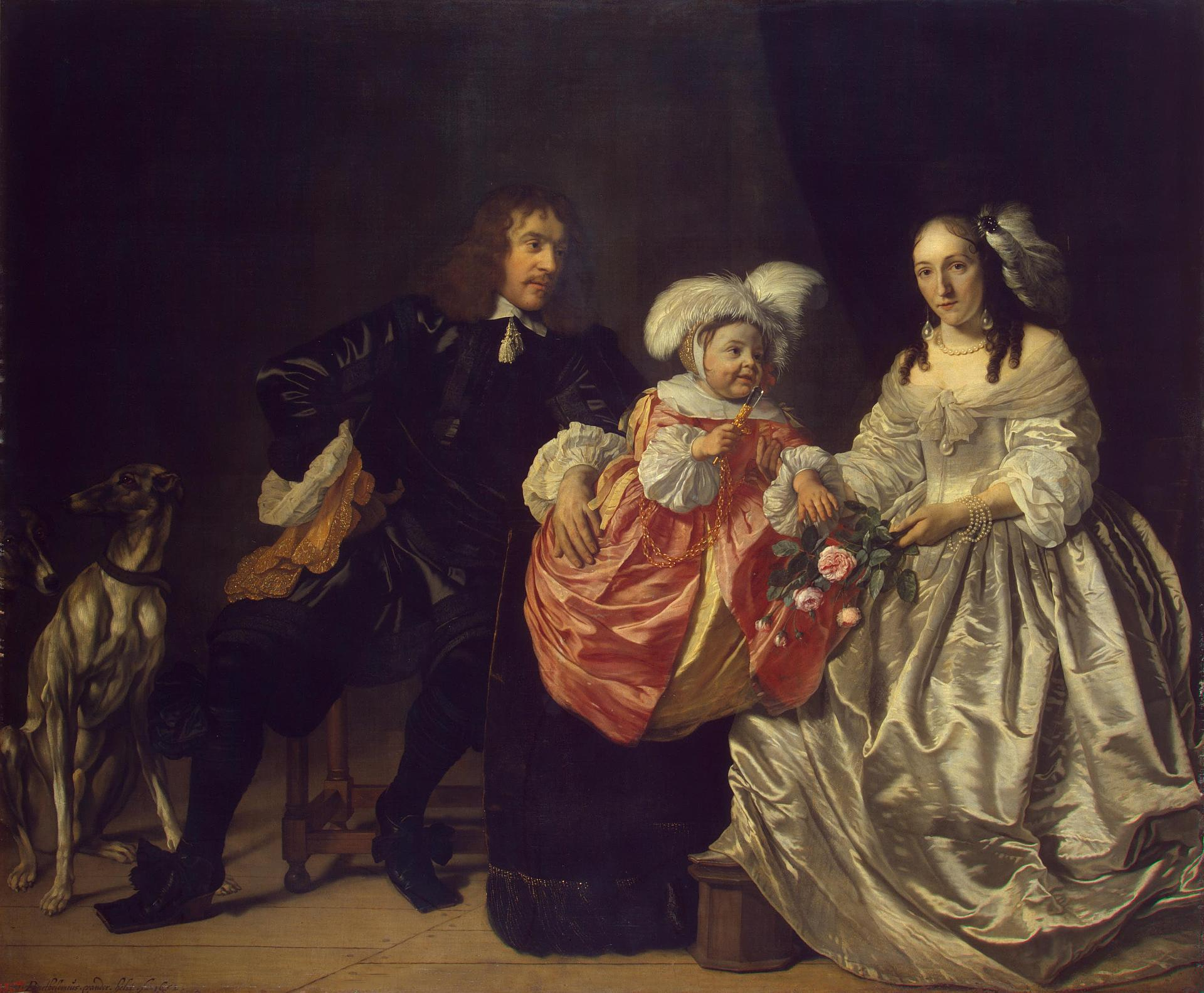
Pieter Lucaszn van de Venne and Anna de Carpentier with their child

His first dated picture, the Regents of the Walloon Orphanage in Amsterdam, dates from 1637. The style of this painting suggests that in Amsterdam van der Helst may have trained with Nicolaes Eliaszoon Pickenoy. His first important commission was for a large schuttersstuk known as the Civic Guard led by Captain Roelof Bicker and Lieutenant Jan Michielsz. Blaeuw. Van der Helst received the commission in 1639 and finished it in 1642. The large 7.5m wide canvas was hung over the fireplace of the grand assembly of the Kloveniers guild, the same room for which Rembrandt painted The Night Watch. The success, which the artist achieved with this composition, led to many commissions for single and double portraits of Amsterdam's leading class such as his Portrait of Andries Bicker, the mayor of Amsterdam. The city's military brass and wealthy members of the regent class all had portraits made by van der Helst.

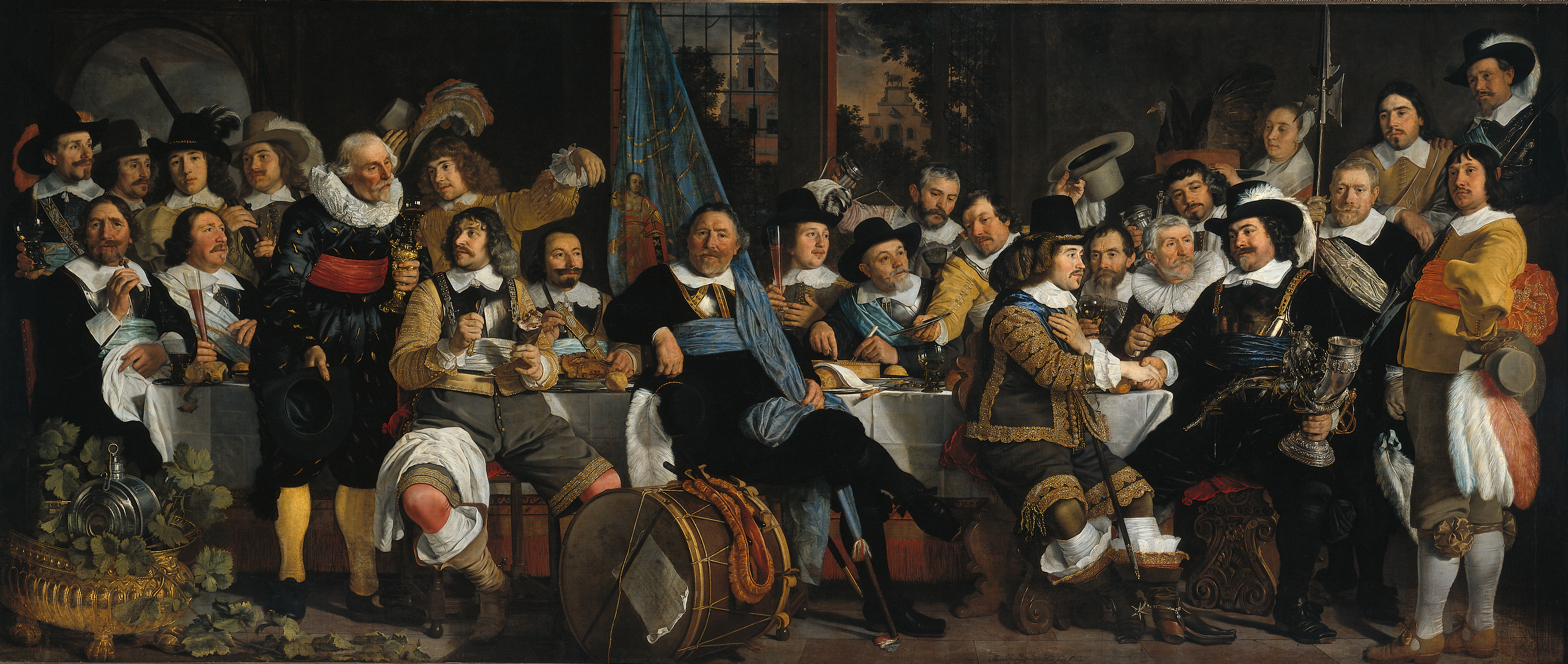
Banquet of the Amsterdam Civic Guard in Celebration of the Peace of Münster

Even though van der Helst was active in Amsterdam at the same time as Rembrandt, he was able to become the most popular portraitist in that city, through his elegant and flattering portrayals in the style of Anthony van Dyck. His work was considered more immediately appealing than the dark, intense and introspective work during this later period of Rembrandt. Rare among portrait artists in Amsterdam of his time, he was able to attract bourgeois patrons from other cities such as Rotterdam.

His large group portrait, Banquet of the Amsterdam Civic Guard in Celebration of the Peace of Münster (Rijksmuseum, Amsterdam), was painted in 1648, and exhibited to popular acclaim. It was this painting that sealed his fame for future generations, according to the Dutch artist biographer Arnold Houbraken. The painting was admired by Godfried Kneller and Joshua Reynolds. Van der Helst received a commission from the circle of the Stadtholder family, when he was asked in 1652 to paint the portrait of Mary, the widow of William II, Prince of Orange.

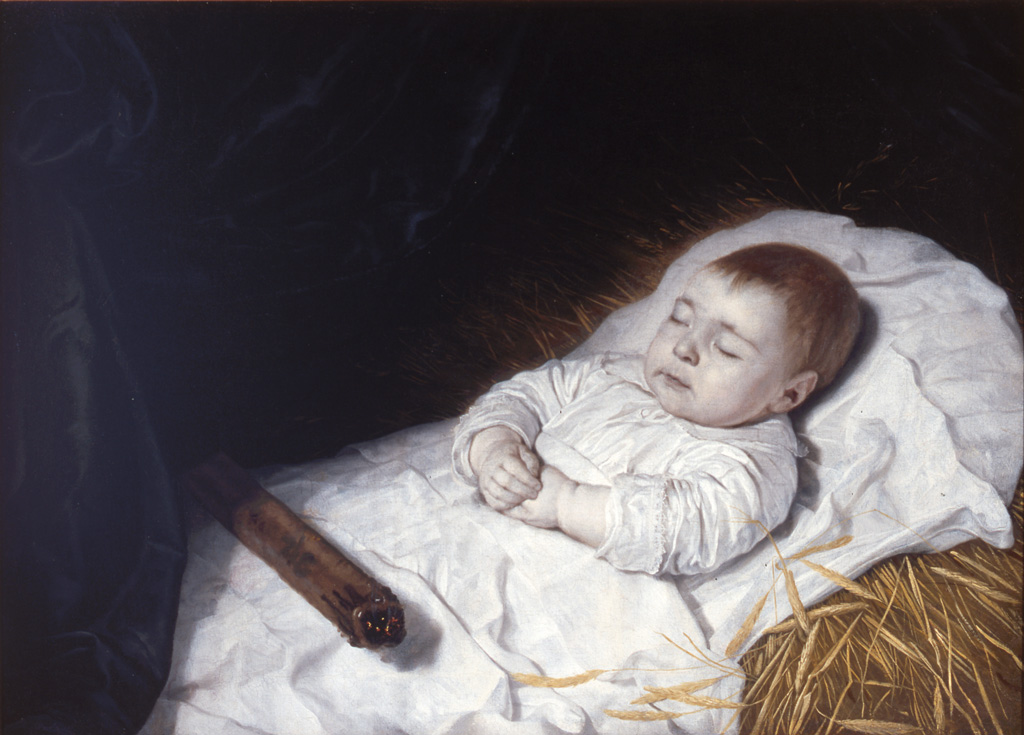
Mourning portrait of a dead child

The artist remained active throughout his life and maintained a high level of production until the end of his career. His late works such as the pendant portraits of Lieutenant-Admiral Aert van Nes and his wife Geertruida den Dubbeld and Vice-Admiral Johan de Liefde (all three dated 1668 and in the Rijksmuseum) still set the trend in portrait painting in his age. The harbour scenes in the background in these three works were painted by Ludolf Bakhuizen.

He was the teacher of his son Lodewijk who followed his style. Marcus Waltes was his pupil in 1650. He had no other known pupils but exerted an influence on Govert Flinck, Eustache Lesueur, Constantin Hansen, Alexander Sanders and Abraham van den Tempel.

Van der Helst died in Amsterdam in 1670. While he had been able to charge very high prices for his works, he appears to have lived above his means. He had bought a large house at Nieuwe Doelenstraat and acquired many paintings of leading artists such as Frans Floris, Simon de Vos, Goltzius, Adriaen Brouwer, Pieter Lastman, Gerard van Zyl, Simon de Vlieger, Hendrik Gerritsz Pot, Otto Marcelis, and Willem van de Velde. After his death his wife was compelled to offer his works and those from his art collection for sale in 1671 in an advertisement in the Haarlems Dagblad. Early 1671 Lodewijk and his sister Susanne assisted their mother when they visited their father's former studio, when his belongings were registered. According to the inventory he owned the schilder-boeck by Karel van Mander; Metamorphoses by Ovid; books by Serlio, Scamozzi, Vitruvius and Palladio; and portraits of Dutch admirals such as Egbert Bartholomeusz Kortenaer.

== Work ==
=== General ===
In addition to the portraits for which he is most famous, van der Helst painted a few genre, historical, biblical, mythological, and allegorical scenes. In all these paintings, the portrait aspect is still important.

=== Portraits ===
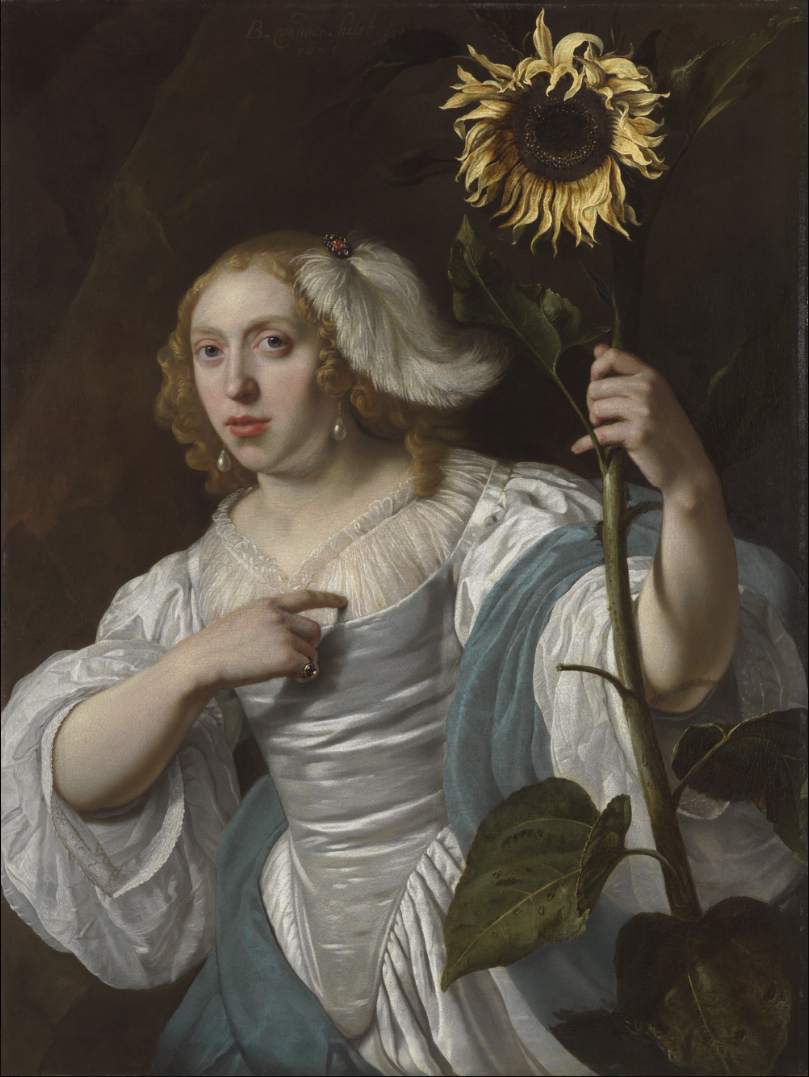
A young woman holding a sunflower

Van der Helst was principally a painter of portraits. The majority of his work is made up of individual portraits, though he also painted family portraits, double portraits and pendant portraits. An example of the latter are the portraits of Lieutenant-Admiral Aert van Nes and his wife Geertruida den Dubbeld. Among his most prestigious assignments were the group portraits of Amsterdam 'schutters' (civil militia members) and regents. The most famous work in this category is his 1648 Banquet of the Amsterdam Civic Guard in Celebration of the Peace of Münster (Rijksmuseum, Amsterdam). In this large-scale composition depicting 25 people, van der Helst was able to do justice to each individual. He also realised a clear composition through his sophisticated use of light and color.

As a portrait painter to Amsterdam's elite, he created life-sized portraits, which responded to the demand of the patricians of Amsterdam for portraits that offered a good likeness rather than an idealized image. His style is characterized by clear drawing, plasticity, even lighting and a pleasant palette relying on light and clear tones. He preferred balanced compositions.

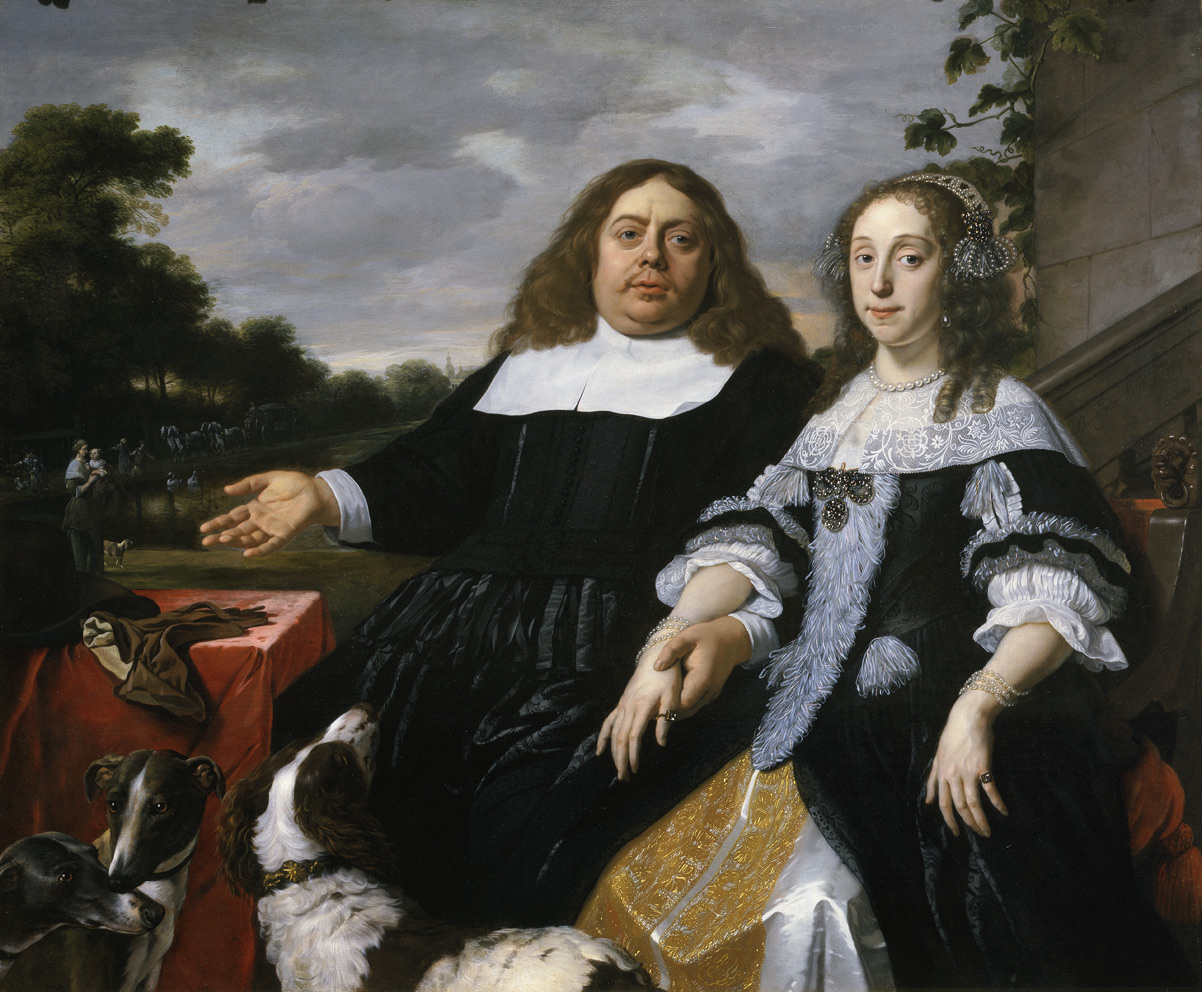
Jan J. Hinlopen in 1665, with his second wife Lucia Wijbrants

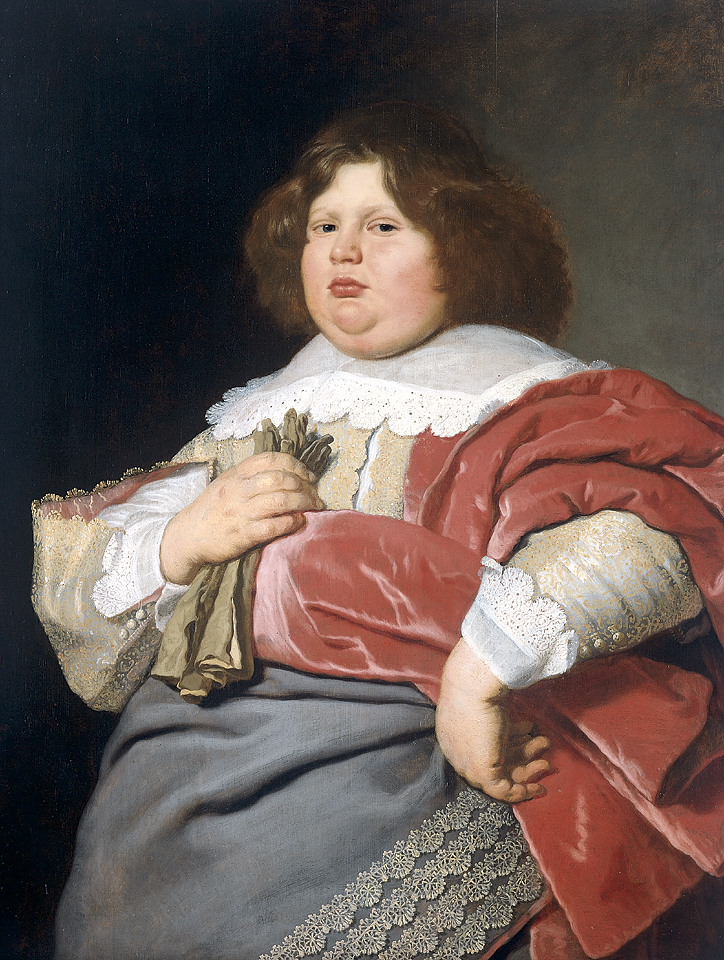
Gerard Andriesz Bicker

His early works show the influence of Pickenoy, his presumed master, and to a certain extent of Rembrandt. This is clear in the Portrait of an unknown man, probably a Protestant minister of 1638 (Museum Boijmans Van Beuningen). It shows a man reading a book who looks up at the viewer as if he has been disturbed, a motive derived from Rembrandt. The vivid representation of the sitter is characteristic of van der Helst's early work.

Van der Helst found his own style in the 1640s. The Portrait of Andries Bicker dated 1642 (Rijksmuseum, Amsterdam) is typical his work from this period: it is well modeled, of a strong plasticity and painted with a barely visible brush stroke.

The fashion for the French elegant style was visible in his work after 1650. An example is the Portrait of the animal painter Paulus Potter painted in 1654. This work was based on a self-portrait of Potter, which he had made shortly before his early death. The gestures and movements of the sitter in the painting are elegant. The artist has further succeeded in rendering the fabrics in a smooth painting style and almost perfect technique.

The paintings of the final years of Van der Helst's career are characterized by increased attention to detail and a more even lighting. The subtlety and intensity that characterizes his earlier work has made way for a clarity of expression that leaves nothing to the imagination. The artist also used a more colourful palette and richer contrasts and emphasized more strongly the distinctions between dark and light tones.

=== Portrait of Gerard Andriesz Bicker ===
One of Van der Helst's most famous works is the portrait of Gerard Andriesz Bicker at half-length of 1639 (Rijksmuseum, Amsterdam). Van der Helst painted in 1642 a portrait of Andries Bicker, the father of Gerard Andriesz Bicker (1622–1666) and the mayor of Amsterdam, as a pendant to this work. The contrast between the two sitters could not be more pronounced: while the father looks like a stern and sober Protestant, the son looks like a fanciful dandy with a smug look in his eyes. At the time the painting was made Gerard Andriesz Bicker was only 20 years old, but already held the title of Lord of Engelenburg, an estate near Herwijnen belonging to the family. This portrait is often used to illustrate the decadent wealth of the Amsterdam merchants of the Dutch Golden Age in Amsterdam.

In 1647 he became High Bailiff of Muiden and Gooiland. In 1650, during the Attack on Amsterdam (1650), a postman from Hamburg heading for Amsterdam ran into the forces, and warned Gerard Bicker, who immediately left by boat for Amsterdam to inform his uncle, burgemeester Cornelis Bicker. The latter and former burgemeester Andries Bicker rallied the civic guard, hired 2,000 mercenaries, lifted the bridges, closed the gates and positioned the artillery. In April 1656 he secretly married Alida Conincx, his housekeeper. In 1660 she was buried in the Nieuwe Kerk, Amsterdam.

=== Genre scenes ===
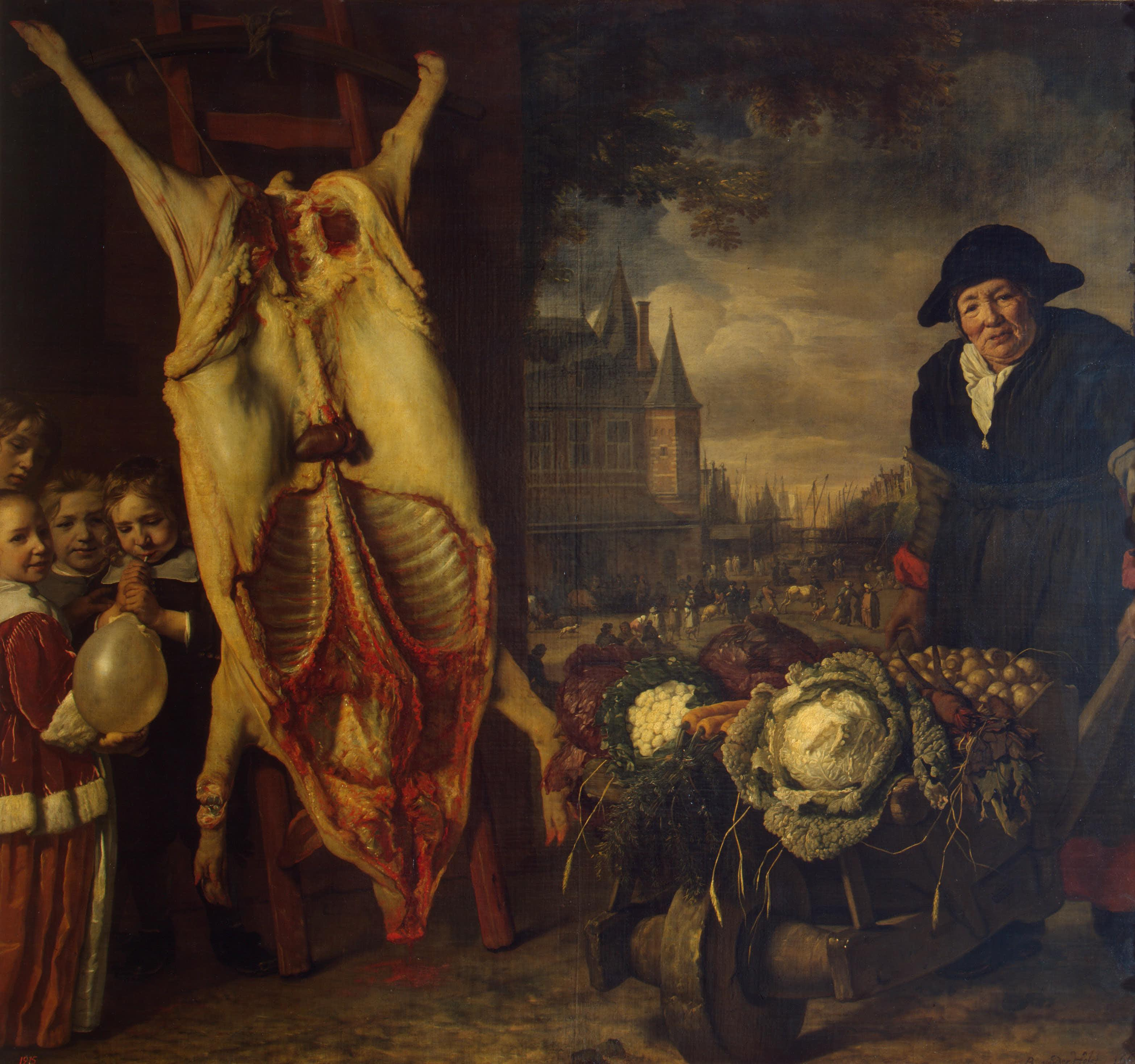
The Nieuwmarkt in Amsterdam

Van der Helst also painted a number of genre scenes. An example of a genre scene by van der Helst is the View of the Nieuwmarkt (1638, Hermitage Museum, Saint Petersburg), which combines still life, cityscape and figure piece. The composition shows an old woman holding a big wheelbarrow full of vegetables. On her left hangs the carcass of large slaughtered pig. Next to the pig are four children, one of whom blows the pig's bladder while the others look at the viewer. In the background is a view on the Nieuwmarkt with the Sint Anthoniswaag. This work was probably made for van der Helst's private use as it likely depicts the view from his house on the Nieuwmarkt.

Another genre scene is The Musician (1662, Metropolitan Museum of Art), which depicts a woman tuning a theorbo while a viola da gamba is resting in front of her. Printed music in tenor and soprano parts is placed on a table nearby. The musician looks directly at the viewer as if inviting him to take up the viola da gamba to join her in a duet. While the work has usually been regarded as a genre scene, it is possible that it is in fact a portrait of Anna du Pire, the artist's wife.

=== Collaborations ===
As was common in 17th-century Dutch artistic practice, van der Helst regularly collaborated with other specialist artists. A frequent collaborator was Ludolf Bakhuizen, a prominent marine and landscape painter. Bakhuizen painted the marine scenes, which are the backdrop of his portraits of the Dutch naval heroes Vice-Admiral Johan de Liefde and Lieutenant-Admiral Aert van Nes with the pendant portrait of his wife Geertruida den Dubbeld (all three dated 1668 and in the Rijksmuseum).

An interesting case of a collaboration between multiple Golden Age painters is the Portrait of Willem van Wyttenhorst. No less than four painters had a hand in its creation: Bartholomeus van der Helst, Cornelis van Poelenburgh, Jan Both and Jacob Duck. Van der Helst was responsible for the general composition and Jan Both for the landscape. It is possible that Duck painted the harness as he was a specialist in guardroom scenes (also called 'kortegards'), which depicted soldiers at leisure among their weapons, harnesses and other military gear in a guardroom. It is likely that van der Helst also painted the face but the role of van Poelenburgh is not clear.

Van der Helst also collaborated with the animal painter Jan Baptist Weenix on the Shepherd boy with sheep and goats. Van der Helst painted the shepherd boy in the painting. He scratched his signature in the wet paint on the boy's collar while Weenix did the same in the wet paint at the upper right. It is believed the painting was intended to be hung over a large fireplace. This probably explains the contrived perspective with the somewhat too large sheep placed right on the edge in the foreground.

== Nazi-looted art ==
Van der Helst's “Little Boy on His Deathbed,” was seized by Nazis during the German occupation of the Netherlands in World War II as part of their campaign to plunder Jewish assets. Recovered after the war by the Allies' Monuments Men, it was returned it to the Dutch government which placed it in a museum. The family of the Jewish Dutch art dealer Jacques Goudstikker won a restitution battle for the stolen painting fifty years later.

Van der Helst's "Portrait of a Man", one of hundreds of works looted from the Schloss family in France in 1943, was stolen twice: after the Allies recovered it and before it could be restituted, it was taken by thieves from the Allied collecting point in Munich in 1945. It reappeared for sale at the Im Kinsky auction house in Vienna.

== Gallery ==
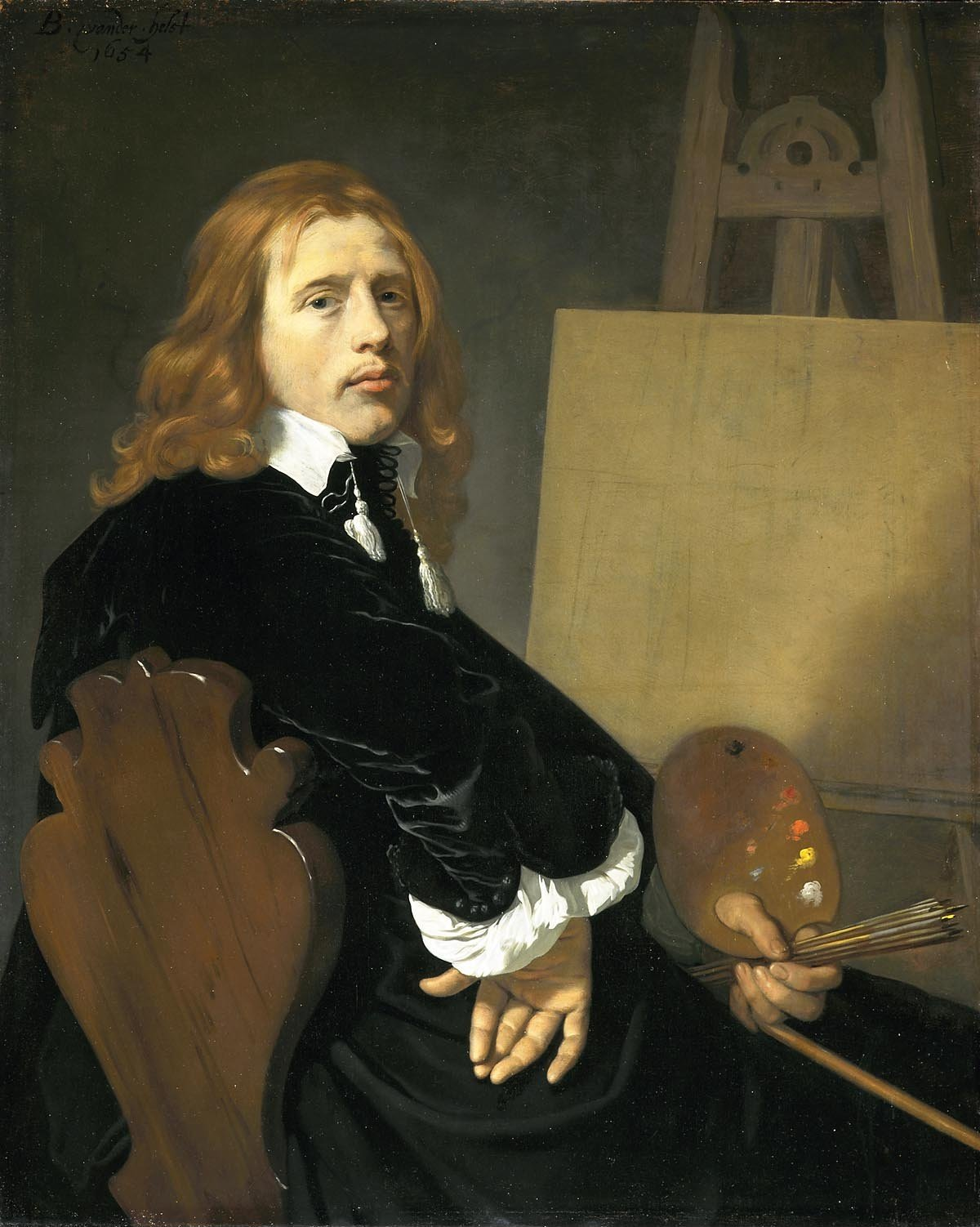
Portrait of the animal painter Paulus Potter

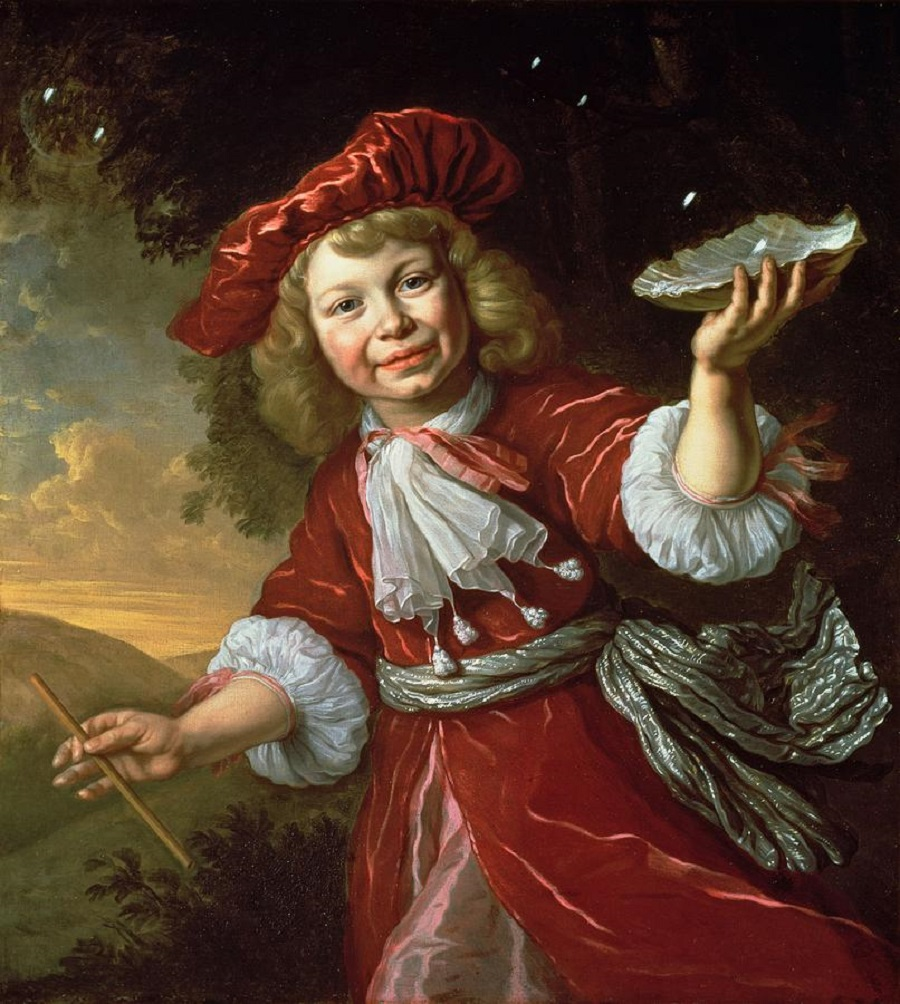
Portrait of a boy blowing bubbles

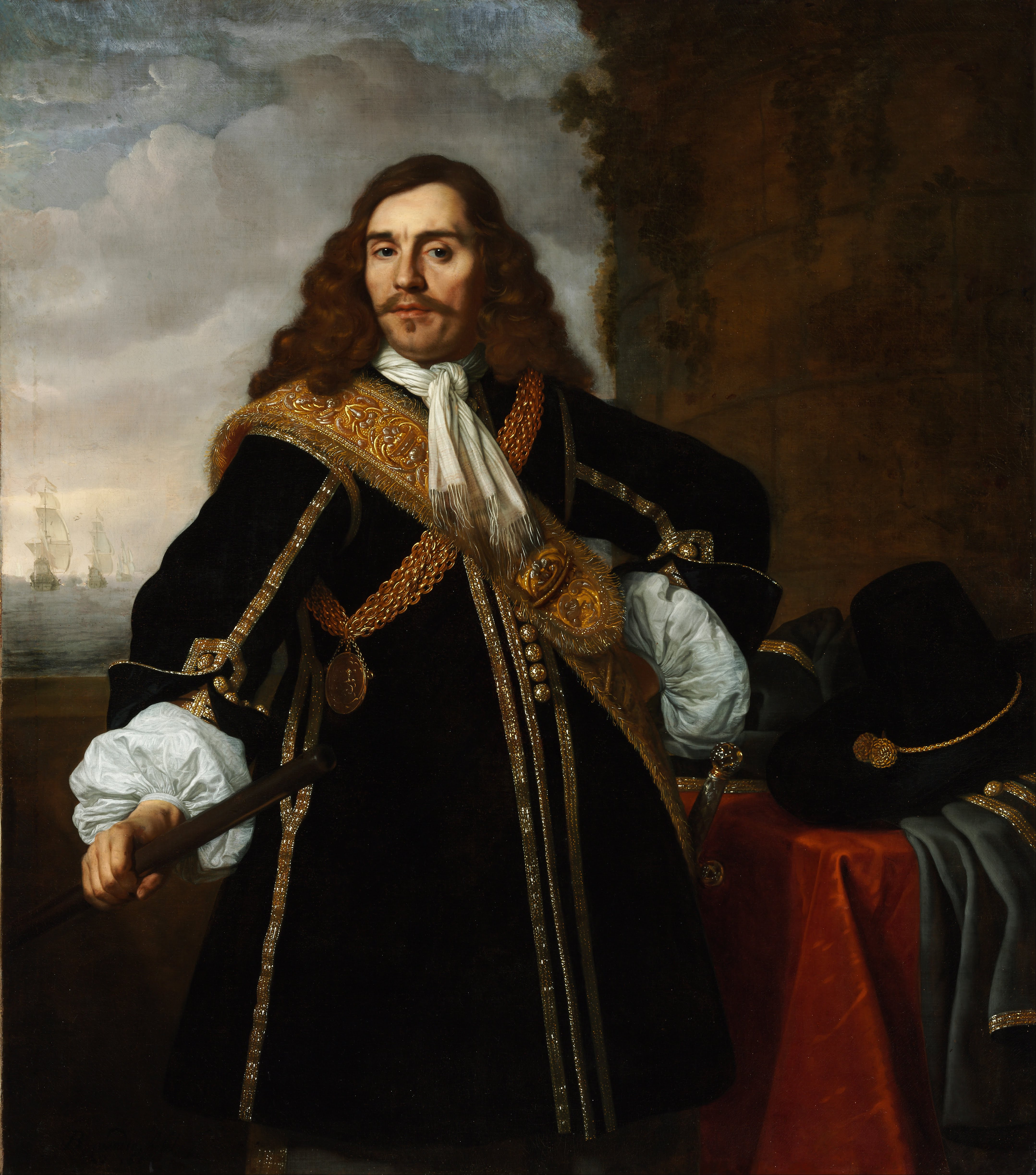
Portrait of Captain Gideon de Wildt

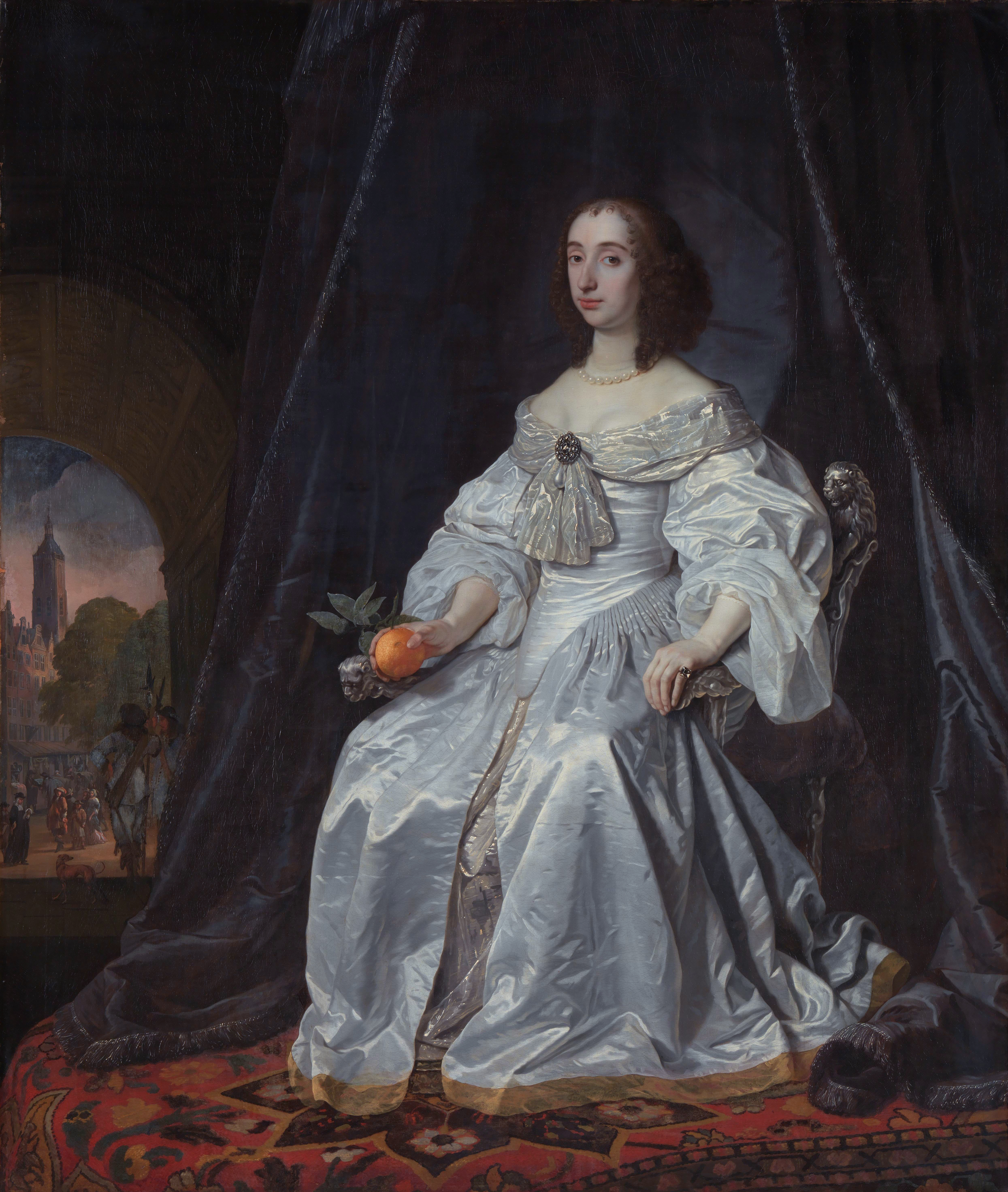
Mary, Princess of Orange

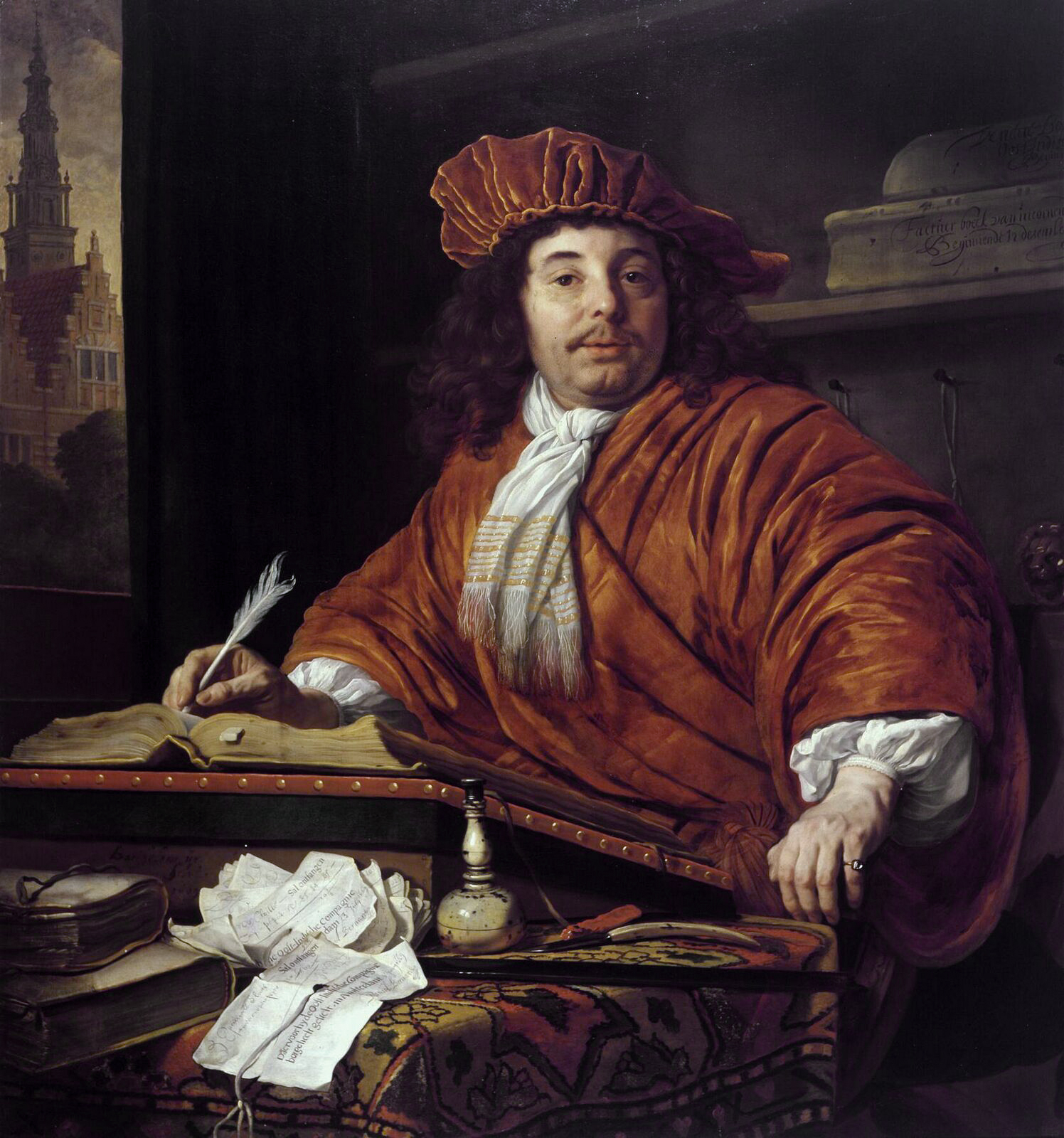
The shipowner Daniel Bernard

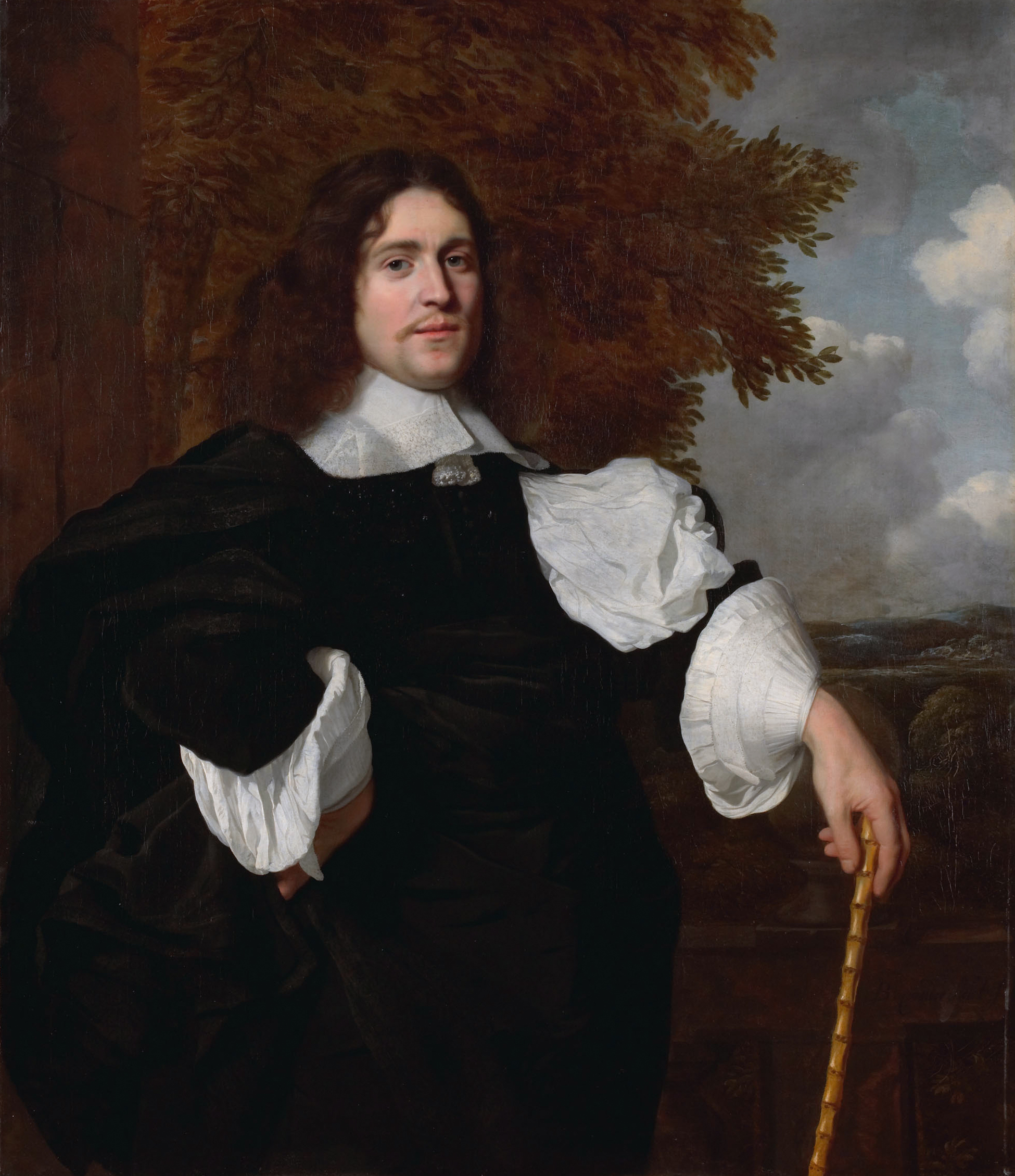
The arms dealer Jacob Trip (1627–1670)

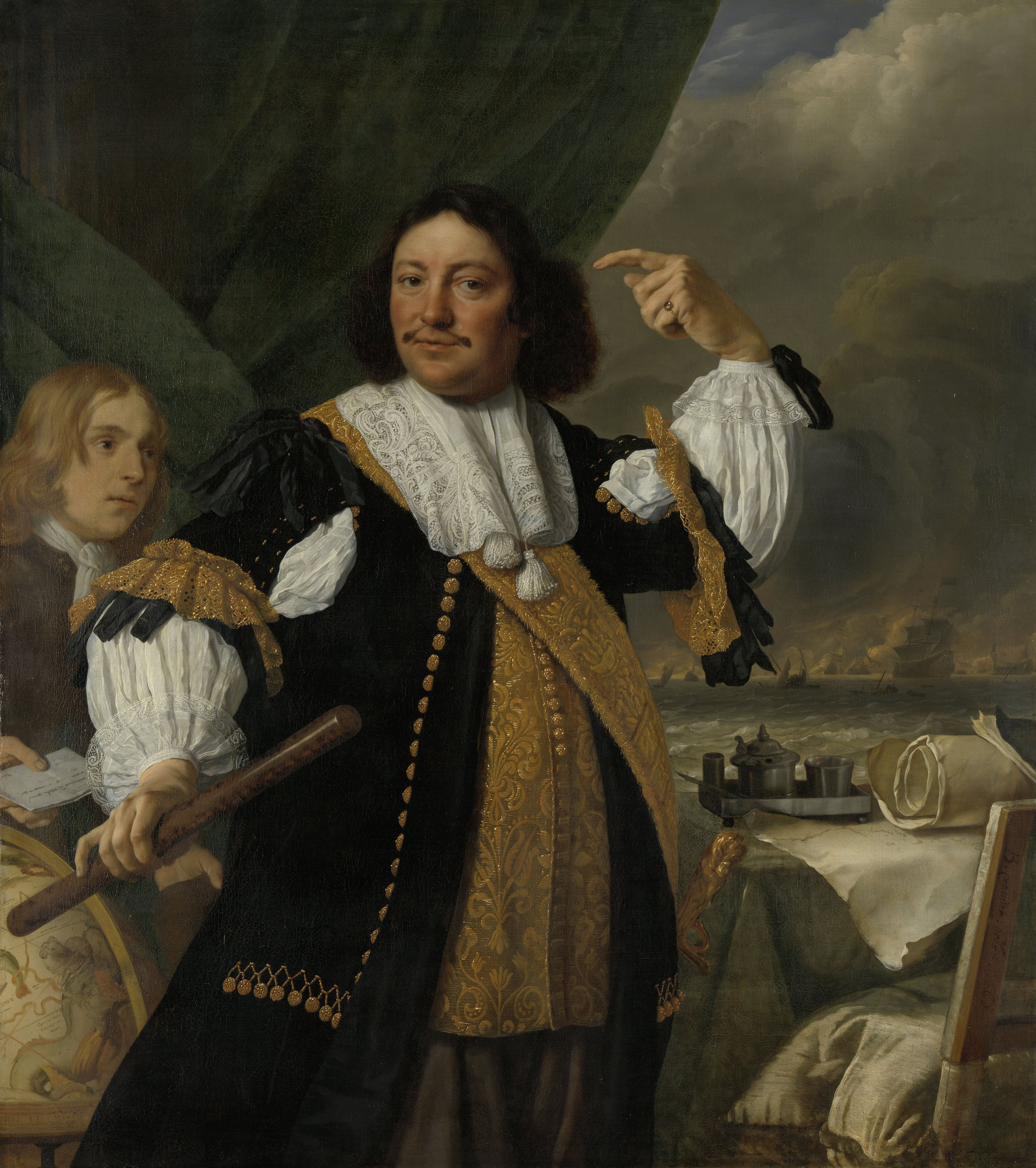
Lieutenant-Admiral Aert van Nes (1626–1693)

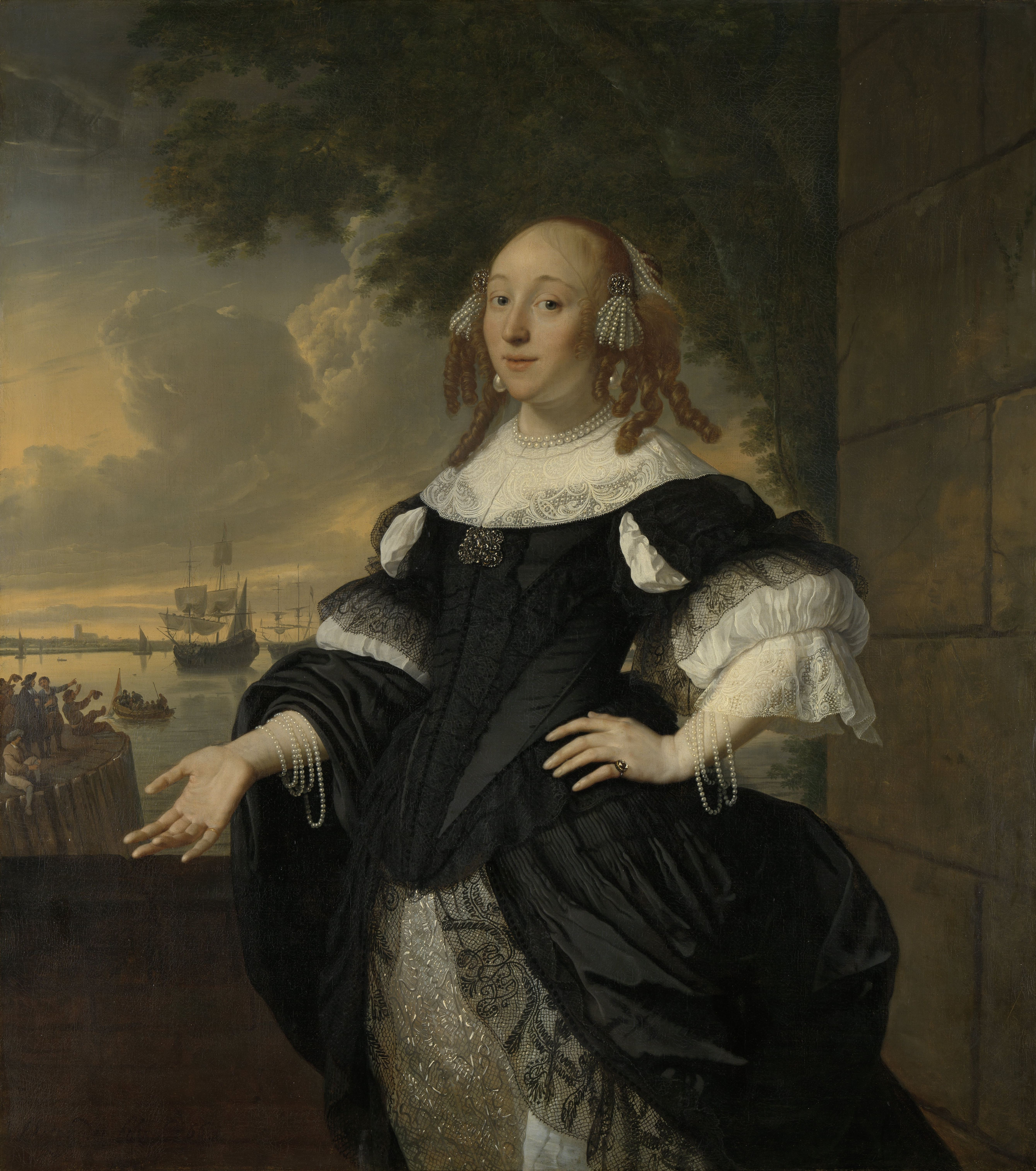
Geertruida den Dubbeld, wife of Lieutenant-Admiral Aert van Nes

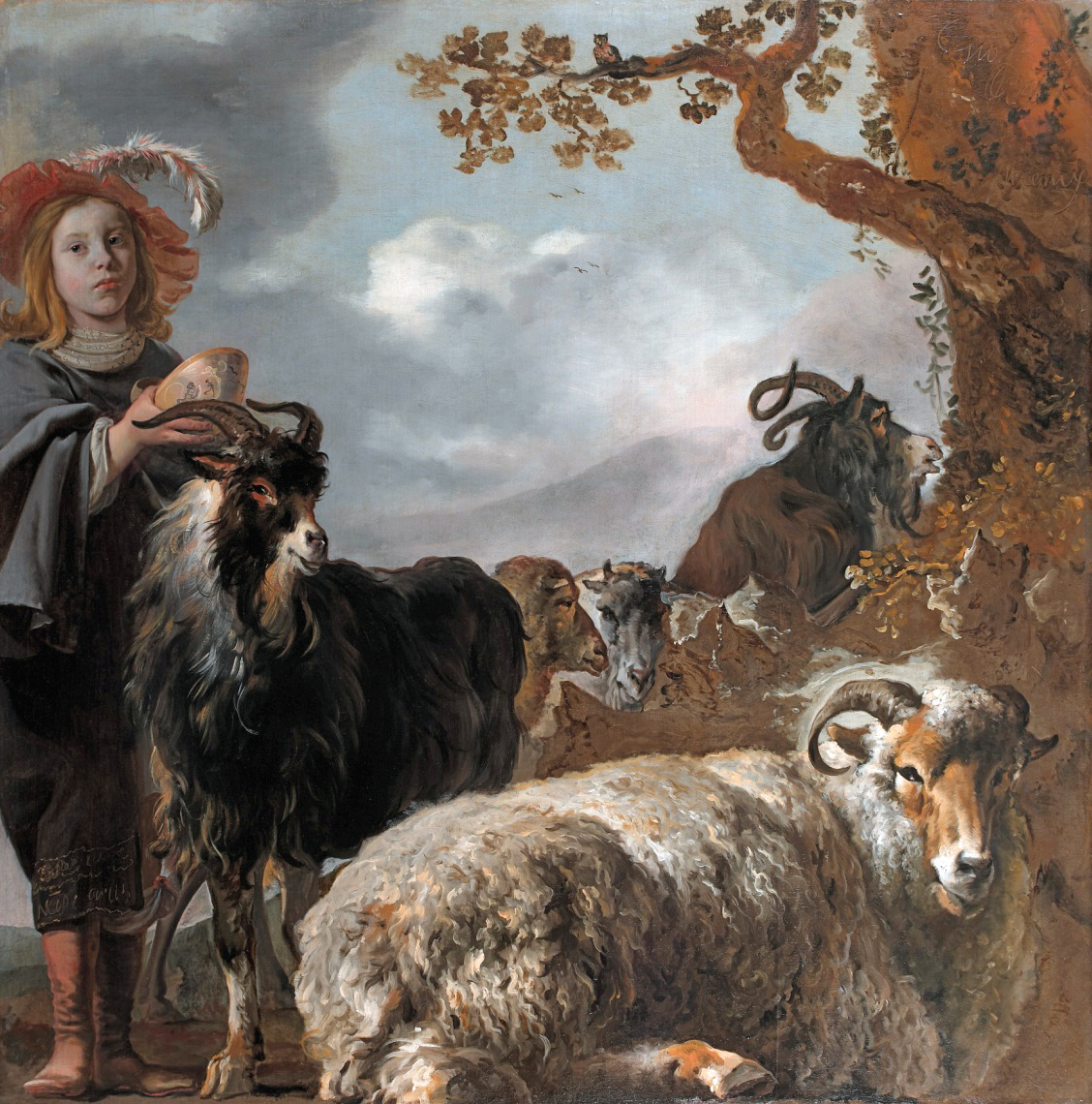
Shepherd boy with sheep and goats, together with Jan Baptist Weenix

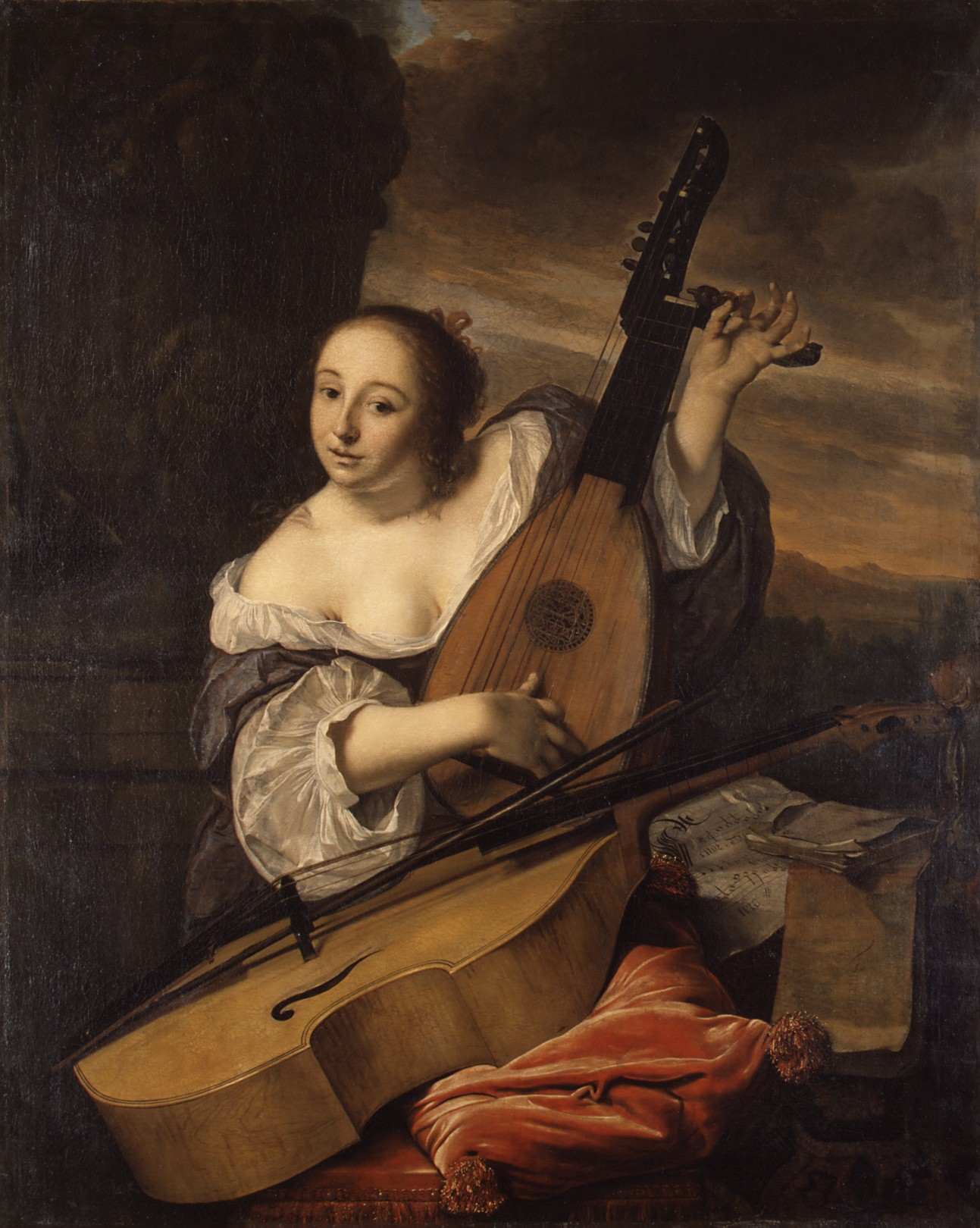
The Musician

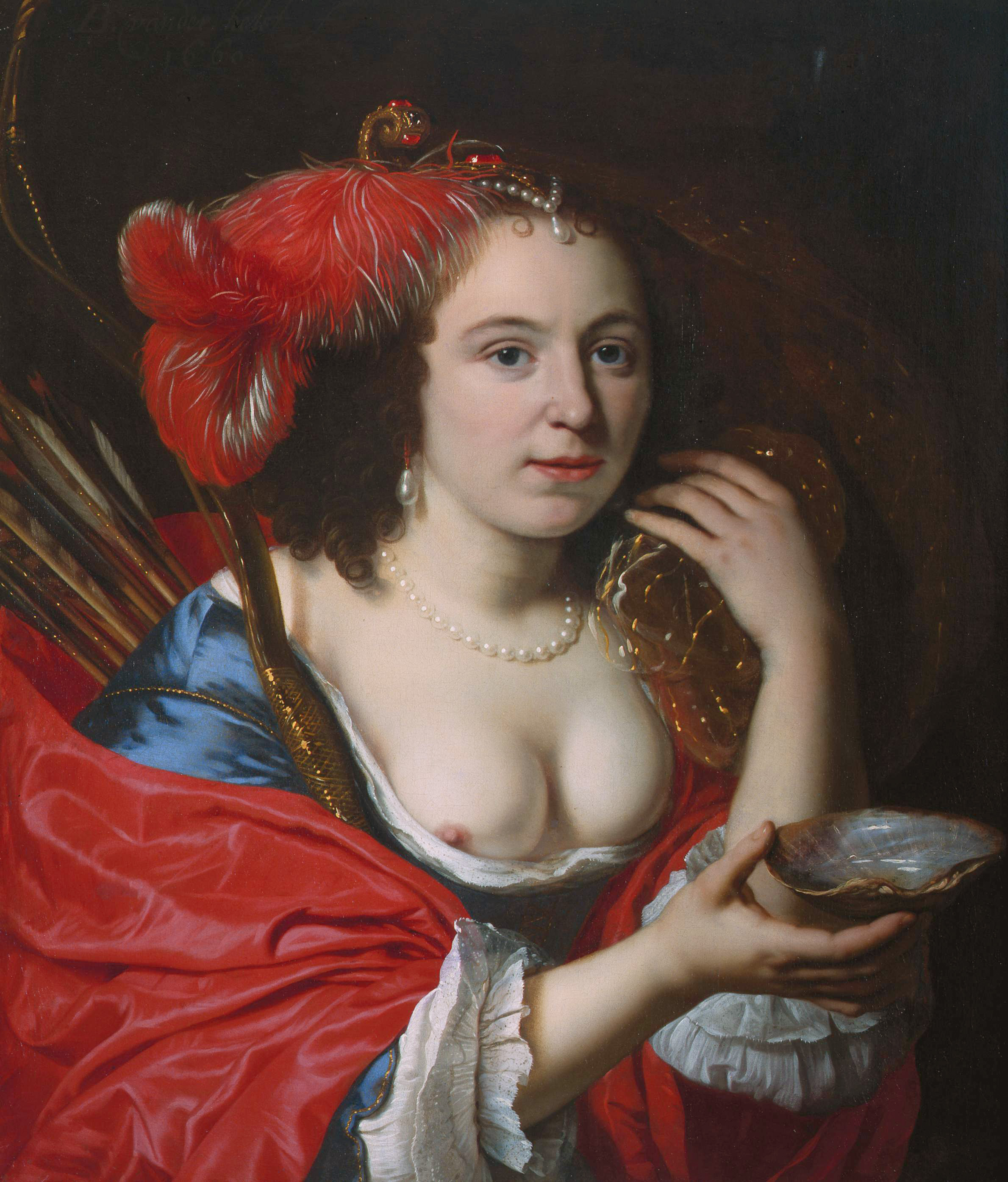
The artist's wife Anna du Pire as Granida

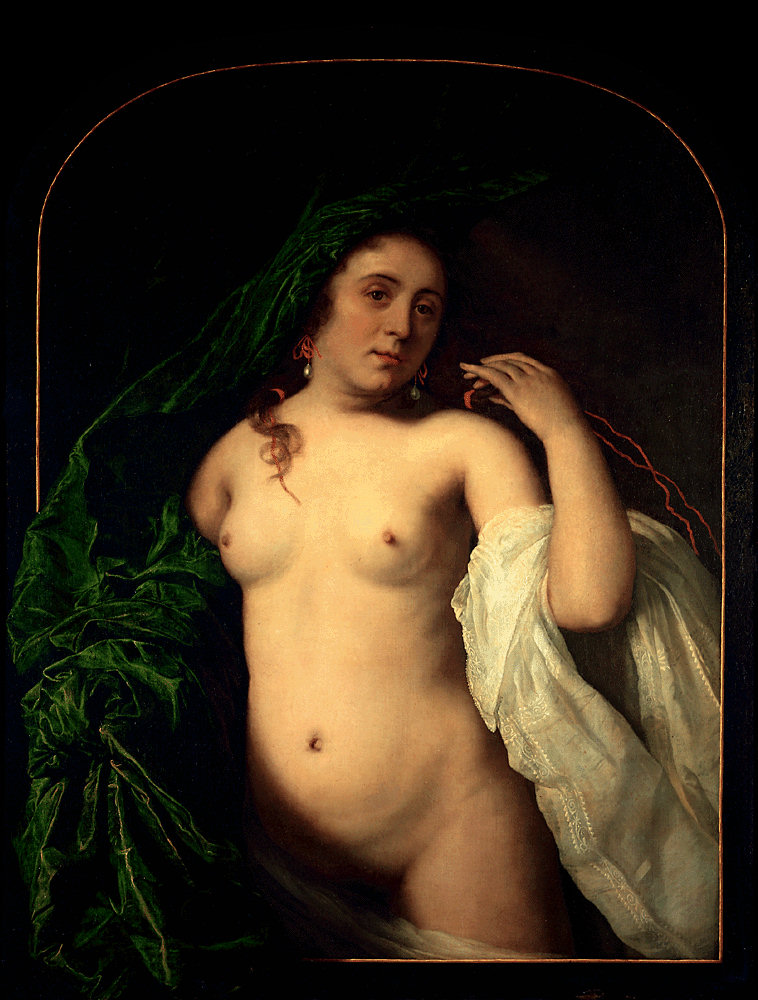
Nude young woman lifting a curtain
