= Parnamirim, Recife =

Parnamirim Is an upscale neighbourhood of the city of Recife, in Pernambuco, in Brazil.

It locates in the RPA-3, north zone of Recife. It does limits with the neighbourhoods Casa Amarilla, Casa Fuerte, Tamarineira, Jaqueira, Santana and Pozo of the Panela.

According to data of the Census of the Brazilian Institute of Geography and Statistical, in the 2000, the population of Parnamirim had a monthly half income of 3 666.44, the fourth elder of the city.

In this neighbourhood is located the Temple of the Church Mórmon, with jurisdiction especially the Northeast.

== Etymology ==
The toponym "Parnamirim" is of tupí origin and means "small sea", through the union of the terms stopã ("sea") and mirim ("small").

== Statistics ==
- Population: 7 636 inhabitants
- Area: 61.0 hectares
- Density: 88.87 inhabitants by hectare
