= Balthasar Florisz. van Berckenrode =

- Born: 1591; Delft
- Died: 1645 (aged 53–54); The Hague

Balthasar Florisz. van Berckenrode (circa 1591 – 1645) was a Dutch engraver, surveyor, and cartographer.

Berckenrode was born in Delft as the eldest of three sons of Floris Balthasar. Active with his father in Rotterdam in 1611 supplying maps for the Admiralty of Rotterdam, he helped him also with his massive commission of maps for the water boards such as the Hoogheemraadschap van Rijnland. He moved to Delft (probably to work for the Hoogheemraadschap van Delfland) between 1611 and 1616. After the death of his father in 1616 he moved to Amsterdam between 1619 and 1634 and was in The Hague between 1635 and 1645. In Amsterdam he made a map of the city and surroundings in 9 folios that can be pasted together.

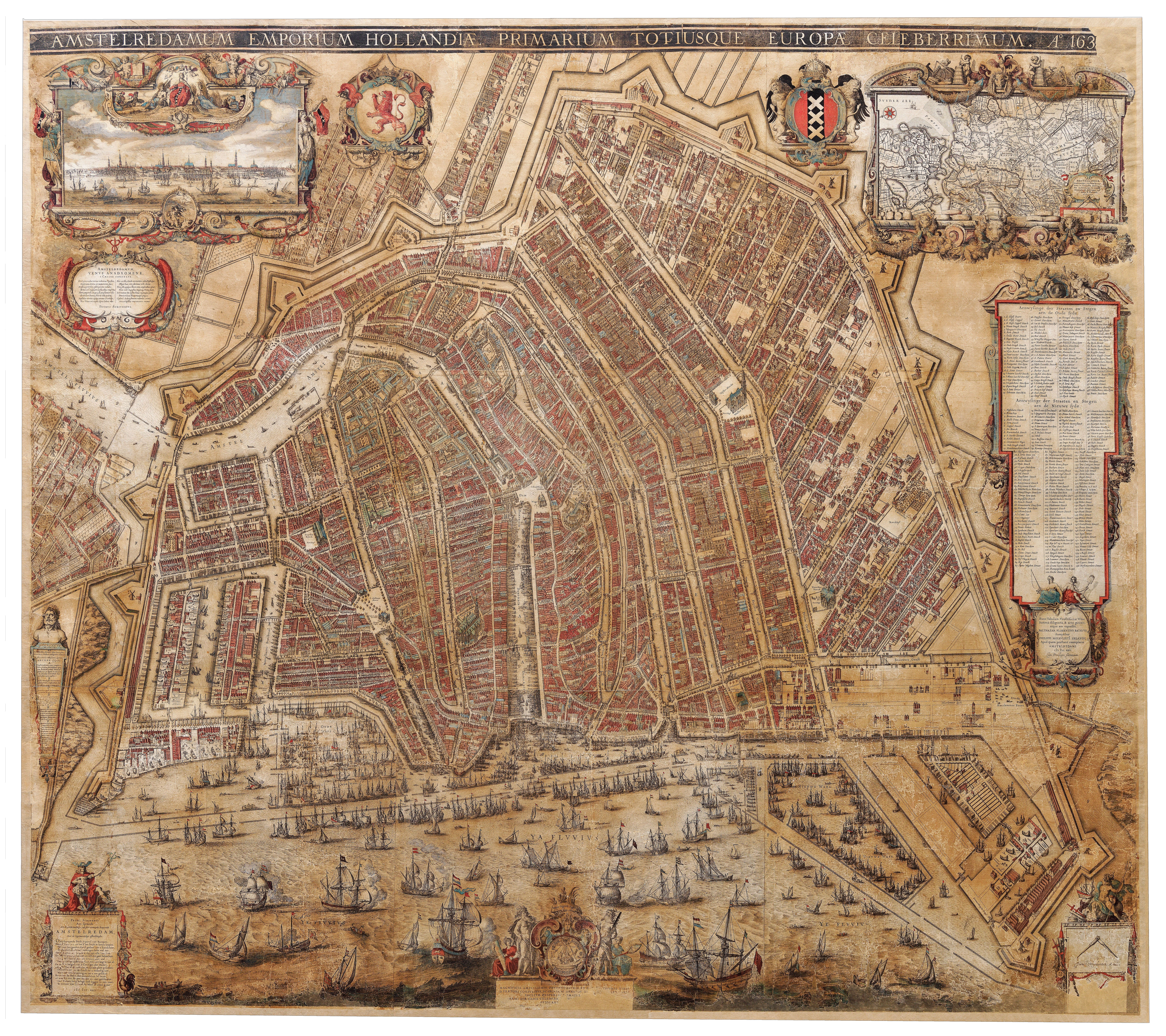
Map of Amsterdam, 1625, pasted and painted, version from University of Amsterdam

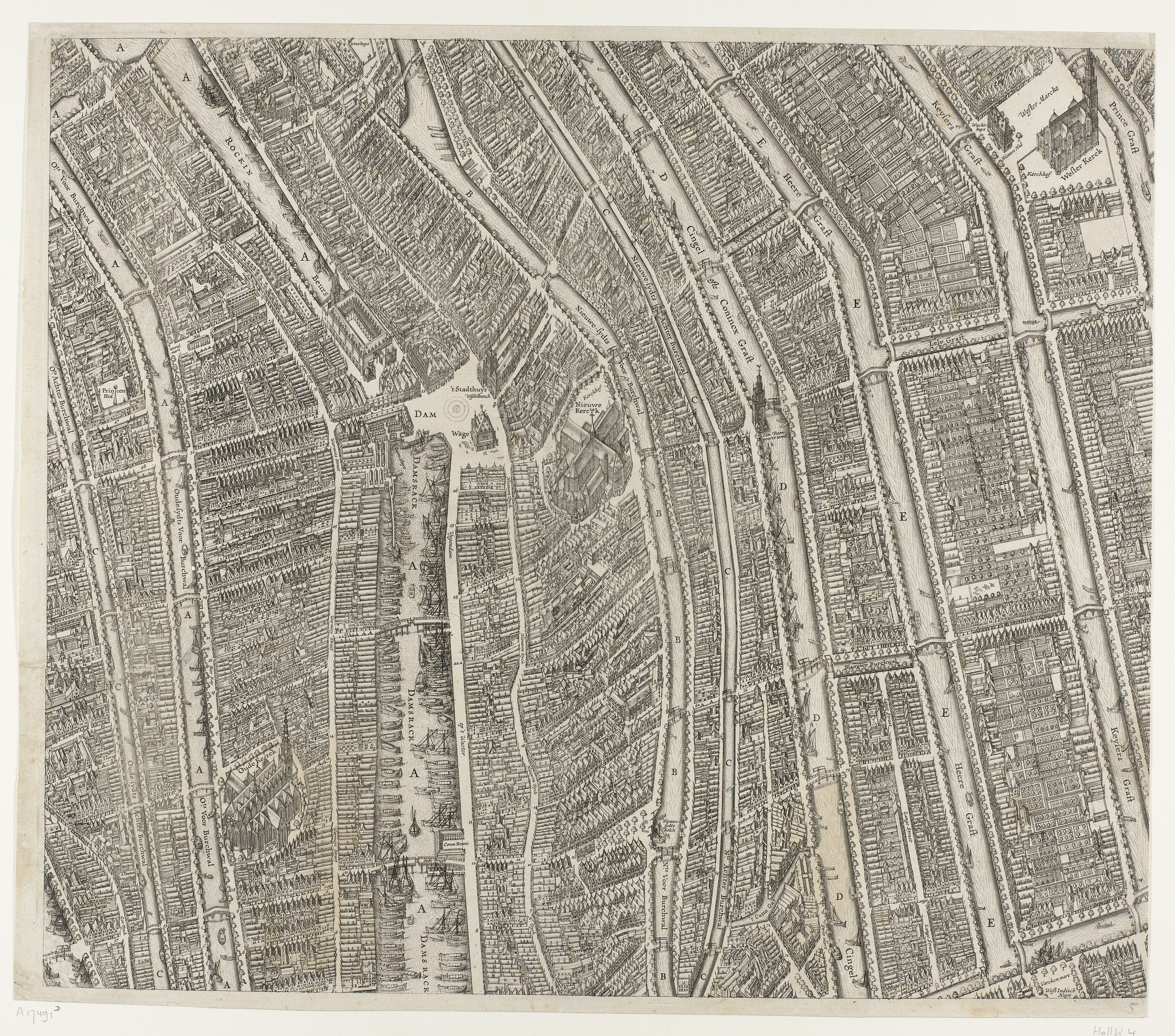
Map of Amsterdam, 1625, unpainted folio showing the city center, version from Rijksmuseum

In 1620 the States General granted him a privilege to publish a large map of Holland and West Friesland, and he sold his privilege and plates the next year to Willem Blaeu who specialized in atlases and a partnership continued, because Blaeu also printed updated maps from him. This map became quite popular and was later copied by Johannes Vermeer, hanging on the wall with the title Nova et Accurata Totius Hollandiae & Westfriesiae Topographia in his famous painting Officer and Laughing Girl and Woman Reading a Letter.

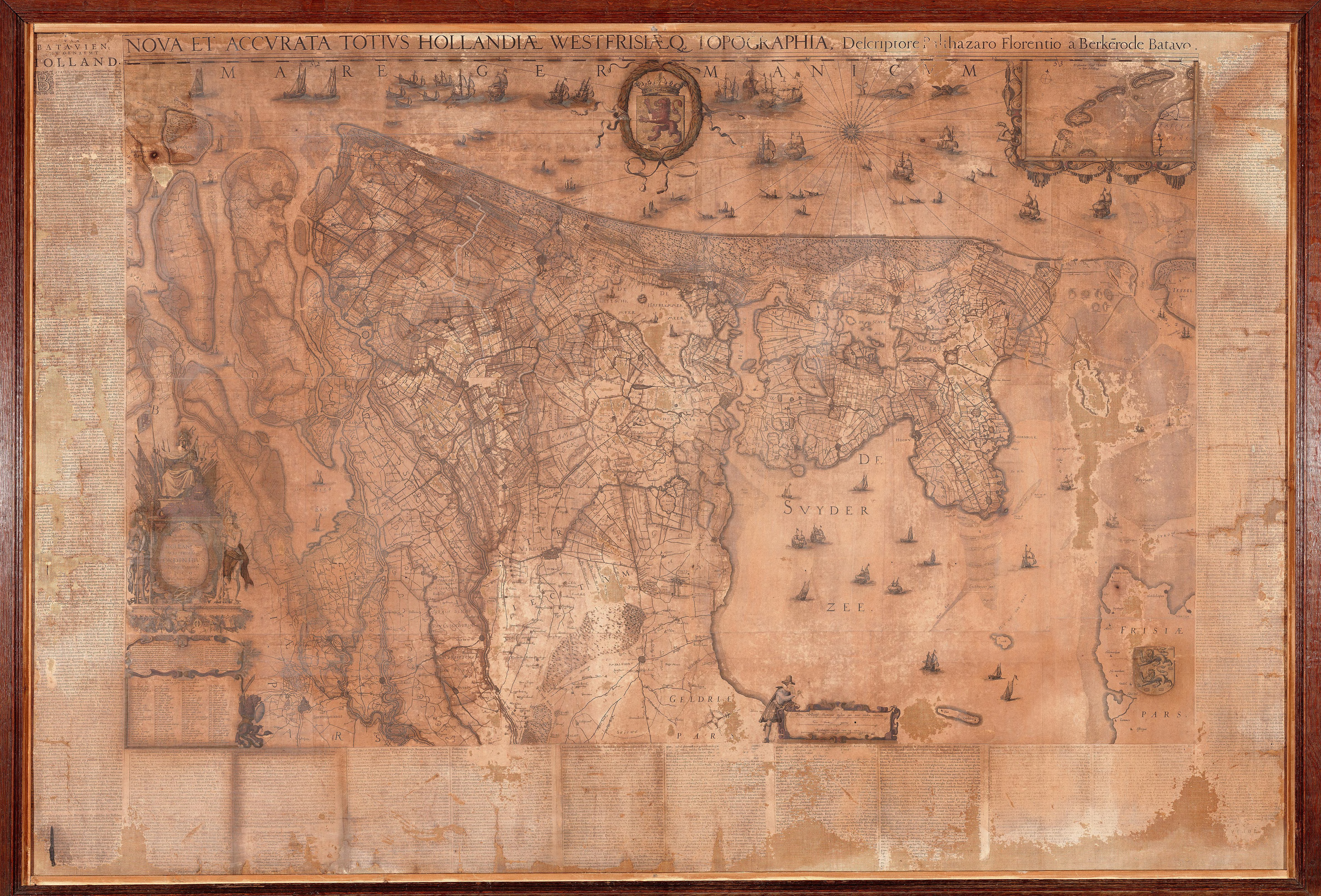
NOVA et accurata totius hollandiae westfrisiaecq. topographia, 1621

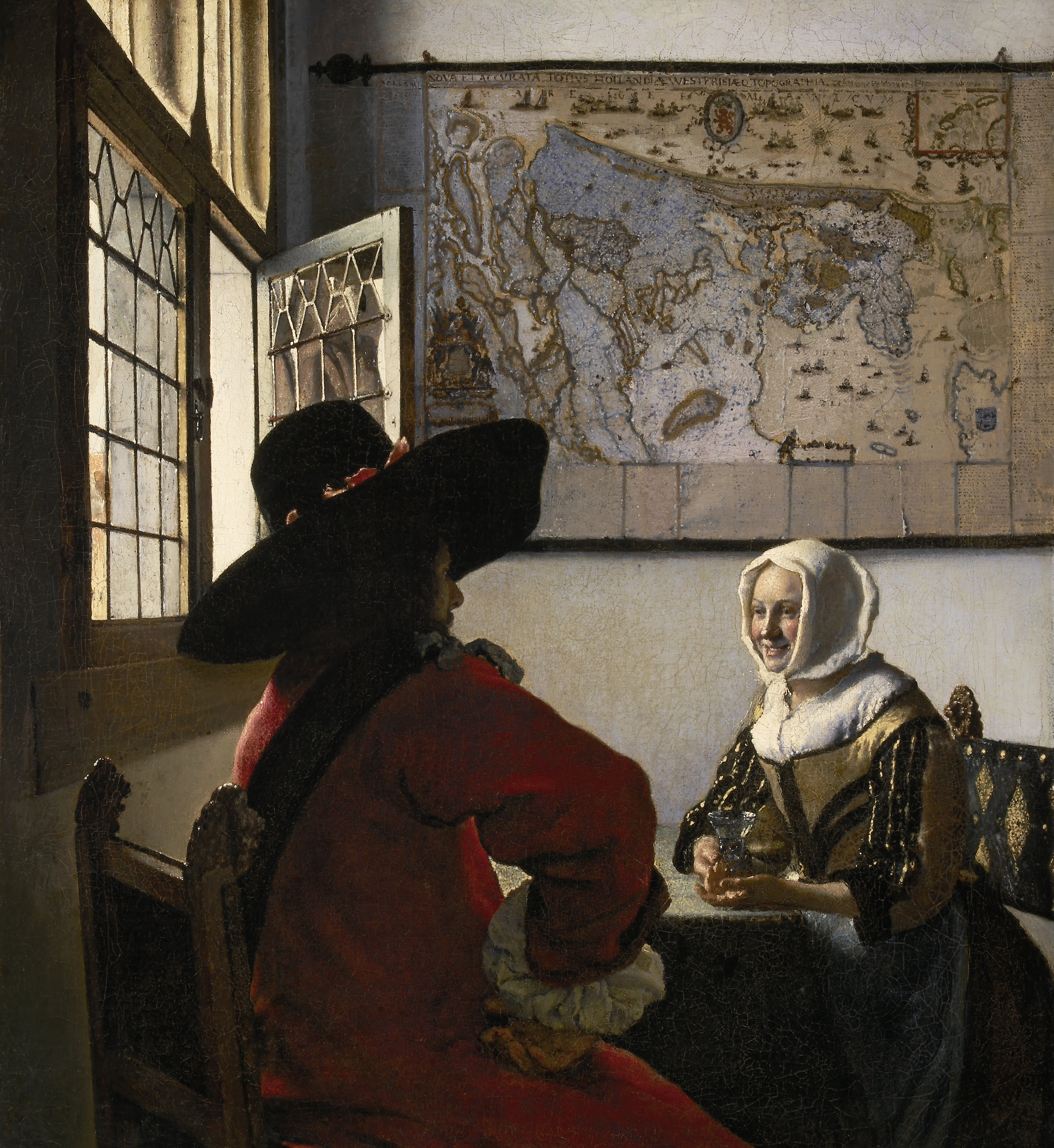
Vermeer's Officer and Laughing Girl

He created a 6-folio map of the Beemster:

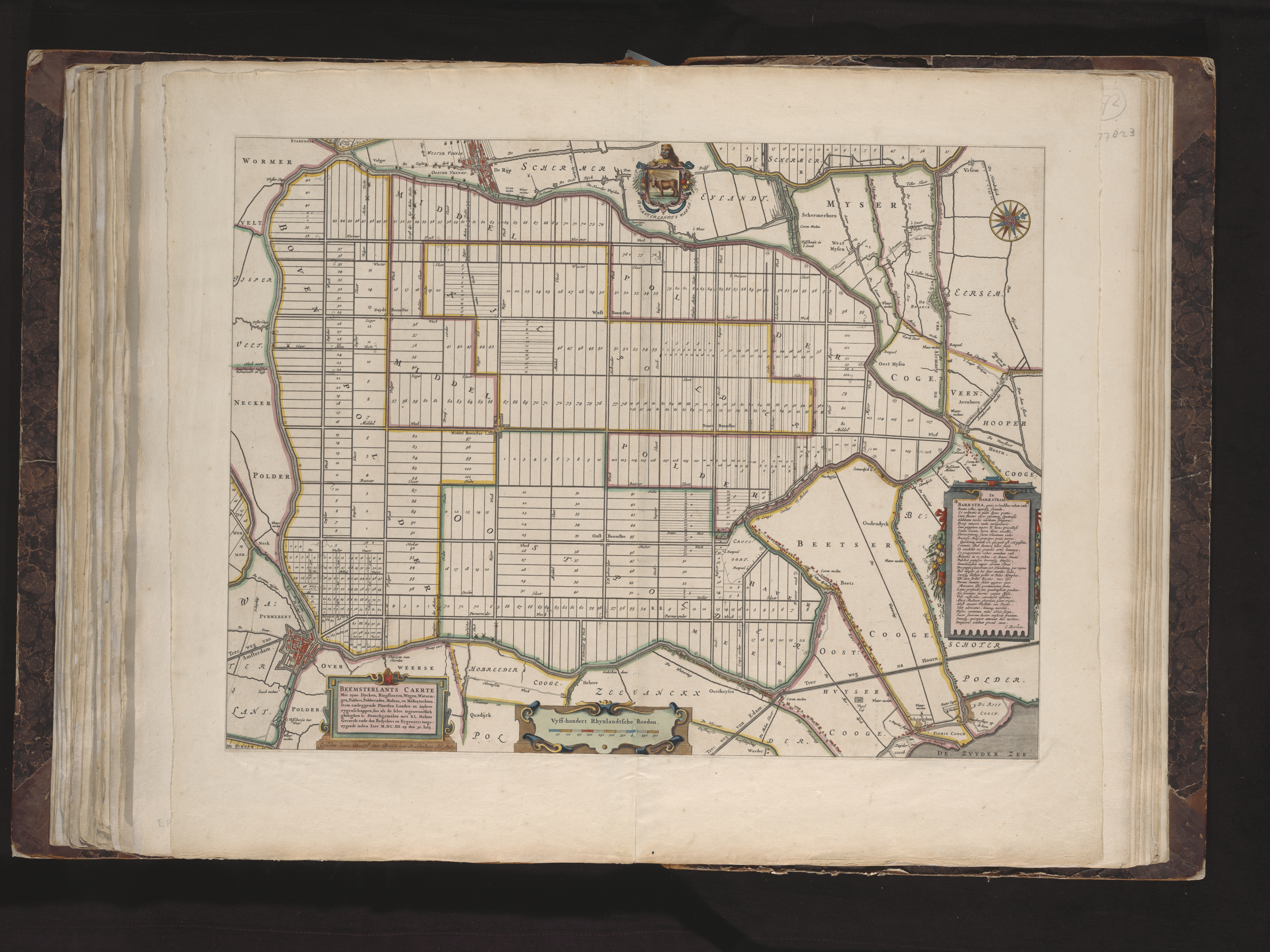
1658 version attributed to Daniel van Breen (1594–1664), Caspar Barlaeus and Balthasar Florisz. van Berckenrode, University of Amsterdam

Berckenrode died in The Hague. The cartographer Pieter Hendricksz Schut was his pupil.
