= Anna Gonsalves Paes de Azevedo =

Brazil plantation owner

Anna Gonsalves Paes de Azevedo (Salvador de Bahia, Brazil; 1612—The Hague, Netherlands; 21 December 1674), or Anna Paes, was a Brazilian plantation owner.

== Biography ==
Anna Paes was the daughter of the prominent Portuguese landowner Jerônimo de Azevedo and Isabel Gonsalves Paes. In 1630, she married the Portuguese army captain Pedro Correia da Silva, receiving as her dowry the Casa Forte sugar mill, the largest in the Capibaribe valley, founded by her maternal grandfather, Diogo Gonsalves. In the same year, Pedro Correia da Silva died in combat against the Dutch who invaded Pernambuco, leaving Anna widowed at eighteen. Against all the expectations of the time, Anna personally took over the administration of the Casa Forte mill.

In 1637, Anna married Charles de Tourlon, commander of the guard of the Dutch governor Johan Maurits of Nassau-Siegen, in Recife. Charles died in 1644. Unlike many women of her time, Anna received a good education from her parents, which enabled her to efficiently manage the Casa Forte mill, maintaining it among the ten most productive in Pernambuco.

During the Dutch occupation, Anna had an affair with André Vidal de Negreiros, one of the commanders of the resistance against the Flemish. After Maurits of Nassau arrived in 1637, André Vidal went into exile in Bahia, leaving Anna in Recife, where she began to frequent Nassau's court and adopted the Calvinist religion. She married again, this time to Captain Charles Tourlon, with whom she had a daughter, Isabel.

After Charles Tourlon's death, Anna married for the third time in 1645, to Gilberto With, a justice advisor to the Dutch government. In the same year, the Pernambucan Restoration began, and the Casa Forte mill became the site of an important battle between the Pernambucans and the Flemish. Anna's property was burned down during the conflict, causing her and her family to face great hardships.

After the Dutch capitulation in 1654, Anna was considered of the same nationality as her Dutch husband and left for the Netherlands, where she reunited with her daughter Isabel. She lost all her properties in Brazil and died in 1674 in The Hague.

In Brazil, "Dona Anna Paes" became a legendary figure, frequently referenced in literature.

== Descendants ==
From her marriage to Pedro Correia da Silva, there were no descendants. With Charles de Tourlon, she had two children:

- Isabella d'Altero de Tourlon (1643), married to the Dutch military officer Virgilio Kaspar Kroyestein.

- Kornelius de Tourlon

With Gilberto With, she had two children:

- Cornelius de Witt (1646, Pernambuco - 1671, The Hague, Netherlands).

- Elisabeth de Azevedo Witt (1650, Recife - Sirinhaém). Elisabeth remained in Brazil when her mother left for the Netherlands and was left in the care of her aunt Jerônima. In 1679, she married her cousin, João De Freitas da Silva, with whom she had a daughter, Maria Martins de Azevedo (1680, Sirinhaém - April 1731, Ceará).

Years after Anna's departure, her heirs filed a claim for compensation for the family's assets, resulting in a treaty with Portugal. The former courtyard of the Casa Forte mill was transformed into a beautiful square in the 20th century, with the first public garden created by the landscape designer Burle Max.
