= HNLMS Johan Maurits van Nassau =

At least two ships of the Royal Netherlands Navy have been named HNLMS Johan Maurits van Nassau (Dutch: Hr.Ms. or Zr.Ms. Johan Maurits van Nassau) after John Maurice of Nassau:

- HNLMS Johan Maurits van Nassau (1932), a gunboat launched in 1932 and sunk in 1940
- HNLMS Johan Maurits van Nassau (1943), a River-class frigate laid down as HMS Ribble, launched in 1943 and renamed on transfer to the Netherlands Navy. She was broken up in 1959
