= Franciscus Plante =

Dutch poet and chaplain (c. 1613–1690)

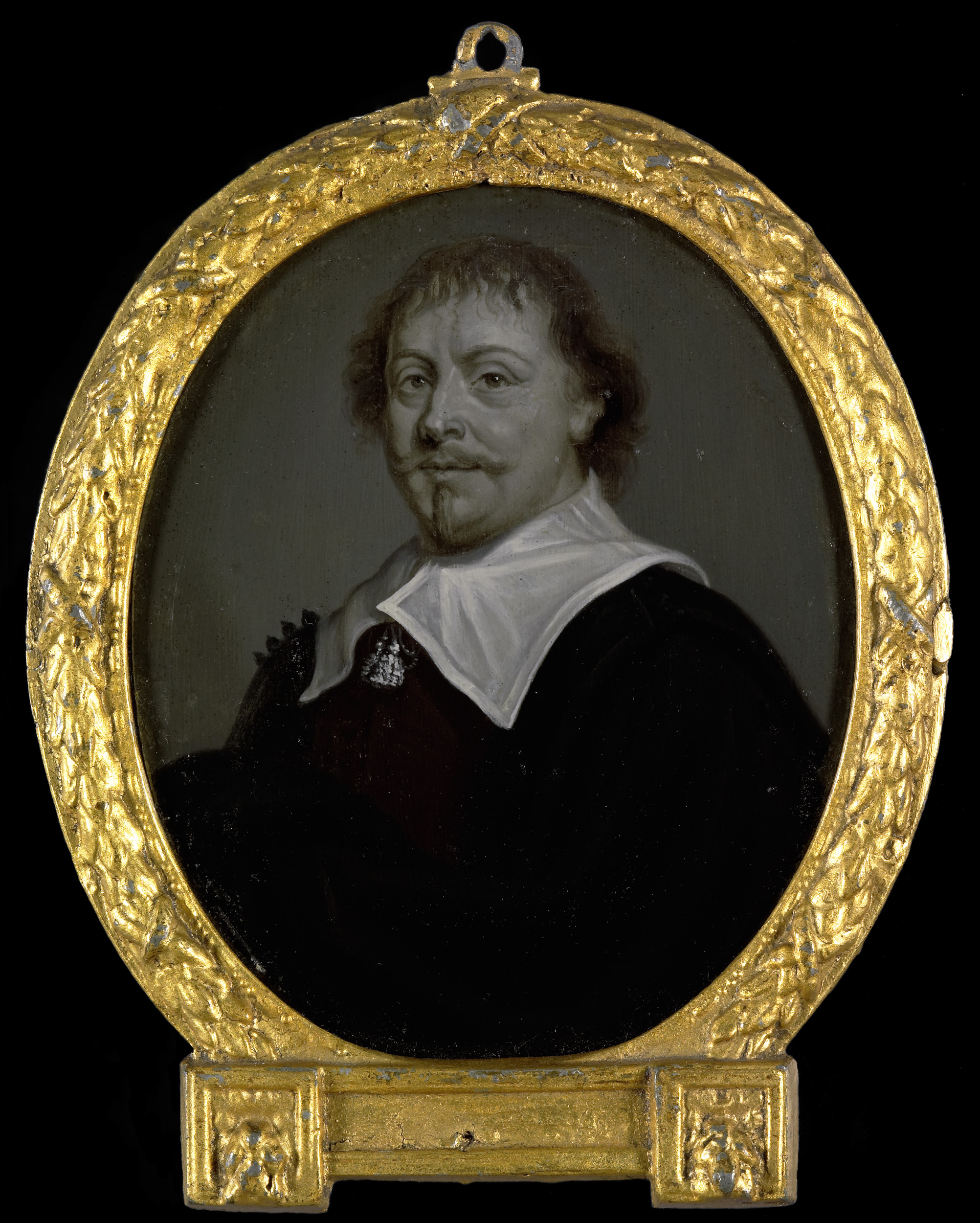
Franciscus Plante

Franciscus Plante (21 April 1613 (bapt.) – 1690) was a Dutch poet and chaplain.

== Biography ==
Plante was born in Bruges and studied theology at Oxford. In October 1636 he travelled as personal chaplain with John Maurice of Nassau to the Dutch colony in Brazil, returning together in 1644. In 1647 became a minister in Strijen, in 1653 in Zevenbergen and in 1657 in Breda, where he remained until his death. He is thought to have died in Breda.

In 1647, he finished a twelve-volume Latin epos called Mauritias (in Portuguese, Mauritiados), which in the first six volumes describes the activities of the Dutch West Indies Company from 1624 to 1634 and in the last 6 volumes praises John Maurice's leadership from 1634 to 1641. It was published in Amsterdam, and included twenty engravings that had already appeared in a work by Caspar Barlaeus, which had been published in the same year. Four maps (Ceará, Pernambuco, Paraíba, and Pernambuco Borealá) and a portrait of John Maurice were also incorporated from Barlaeus’ work. Plante later wrote Barlaeus' obituary in 1648.

== Sources ==
- (in Dutch) Obituary of Barlaeus, by Plante
- (in Portuguese) Historia naturalis Brasiliae
- W.A.P. Smit, Het Latijnse epos van Franciscus Plante, pp 238 – 241 of Kalliope in de Nederlanden. Het Renaissancistisch-klassicistische epos van 1550 tot 1850. Van Gorcum & Comp., Assen 1975–1983. (Dutch)
