= Campaign of Porto Calvo =

1637 military campaign in Brazil

- Part of the Dutch invasions of Brazil
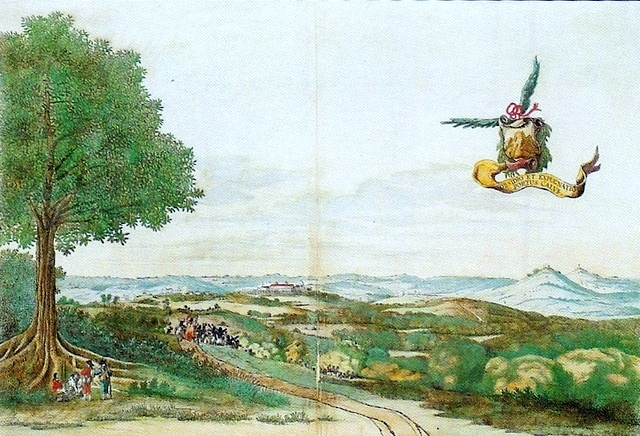
- Battle of Porto Calvo 1637
Date	1637
Location	Porto Calvo, Brazil
Result	Dutch victory

Belligerents
Portugal; Spain	Dutch Republic: West India Company

Commanders and leaders
	(Dutch West India Company) John Maurice, Prince of Nassau-Siegen (Dutch West India Company) Sigismund von Schoppe

Strength
2,600 Men (last year at Porto Calvo most likely more this year)	3,350 Men

Casualties and losses
Unknown	6 dead 52 wounded

The Campaign of Porto Calvo, alternatively recognized as the Fall of Porto Calvo, denotes a military expedition directed by John Maurice, Prince of Nassau-Siegen, aimed at the capture of Porto Calvo. This endeavor proved successful as Prince John Maurice effectively secured control over the entire region.

== Background ==
Following the initiation of the Groot Desseyn by the Dutch West India Company, a strategic endeavor marked by its expansive aspirations, the Dutch progressively assumed control over various Portuguese forts and colonies. Notably, the year 1624 saw the Dutch fleet arriving off the coast of Salvador, where a swift invasion ensued, resulting in the city's capture within a remarkably brief span of 24 hours.

This marked an acceleration of their territorial expansion in Brazil. In 1636, John Maurice, Prince of Nassau-Siegen, was appointed as the governor of Dutch-held possessions in Brazil. Animated by an unwavering determination to augment Dutch Brazil's territorial dominion, Prince John Maurice spearheaded multiple far-reaching expeditions aimed at further territorial growth and consolidation. John Maurice was also sent for another reason since, Don Luis de Rojas y Borgia arrived in Brazil Upon his arrival, he disembarked his troops at Jaragua and initiated guerrilla warfare against the opposing forces. This involved attacks on farms and plantations. These actions were primarily carried out from the captaincy of Porto Calvo. At one point, a proposal was put forth by Von Schoppe to undertake a more aggressive approach by attacking and destroying the enemy bases. Despite initial reservations, this proposal was eventually accepted. As a result, a decision was made to shift from a defensive stance of protecting farms and plantations to an offensive strategy.

== Campaign ==
Upon the arrival of Johan Maurits van Nassau-Siegen in Recife, he brought with him a fleet comprising four ships and a contingent of 350 personnel. Recognizing the need for additional support, he appealed to Von Schoppe for a reinforcement of 3,000 troops. The convergence of their forces took place in February, at the mouth of the Uma River. Subsequently, a series of engagements and battles ensued against Portuguese forces as they advanced towards Barra Grande. Their campaign eventually led them to the strategically fortified position of Forte do Bom Sucesso. After a period of approximately one to two weeks, the fort succumbed to the combined forces, resulting in its capitulation. Following this victory, the expedition proceeded to engage in the plundering of Alagos. Subsequently, they reached the Heart of Porto Calvo, where a significant battle with Portuguese forces, known as the Battle of Porto Calvo, transpired. This encounter concluded in victory of the Dutch, triumphing over the combined Portuguese-Spanish forces. With this pivotal victory secured, the stage was set for the commencement of a siege against the heavily fortified stronghold of Porto Calvo. The fortress was very strategically positioned surrounding hills, manned by a substantial contingent of soldiers, which rendered it well-guarded. Employing a tactical approach, the Portuguese forces positioned on the hills engaged in artillery fire against the Dutch. In response, the Dutch forces undertook the construction of tunnels leading towards the fort, a process that spanned approximately a week. Subsequently, the fortress of Porto Calvo yielded, surrendering to the Dutch forces, the Dutch got a very large amount of artillery, and mortars this was a great addition to the WIC's arsenal.

== Aftermath ==
The campaign achieved notable success, marked by the acquisition of a substantial artillery inventory and the effective containment of guerilla warfare activities. Additionally, the campaign led to a significant territorial expansion of Dutch Brazil's domain.
