= Siege of Salvador (1638) =

Siege during the Dutch-Portuguese War and Eighty Years' War

- Part of the Dutch invasions of Brazil
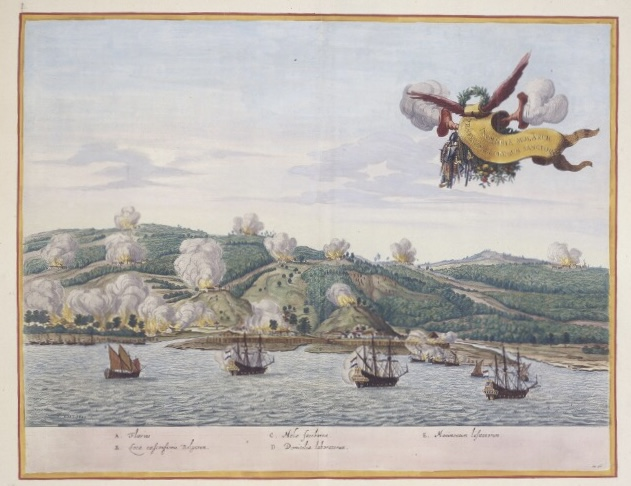
- Dutch burning sugar mills at Bahia
Date	April – May 1638
Location	Salvador, Bahia, Brazil 12°58′S 38°30′W
Result	Portuguese-Spanish victory

Belligerents
Portugal; Spain	Dutch Republic: West India Company

Commanders and leaders
(Portugal) Giovanni di San Felice (Spanish Empire) Luís Barbalho	(Dutch West India Company) Jan Moritz van Nassau-Siegen (Dutch West India Company) Johan van der Mast

Strength
1,000	4,600 (3,600 Dutch troops and 1,000 Brazilian auxiliaries) or 6,000; 30 or 45 ships

Casualties and losses
Light	500 killed 30 captured Large amount of abandoned military equipment
- Location within Brazil Siege of Salvador (1638) (South America)

The siege of Salvador was a siege that took place between April and May 1638, during the Dutch–Portuguese War and Eighty Years' War. The governor of the Dutch colony in Brazil, John Maurice, Prince of Nassau-Siegen, commanding the army of the Dutch West India Company, with vastly superior forces and a supporting fleet under Johan van der Mast, put the city of Salvador under siege. The Portuguese and Spanish defenders, commanded by Giovanni di San Felice, Count of Bagnolo, and Luís Barbalho, managed to resist the Dutch attacks until they gave up taking the city and withdrew with several casualties.

== See also ==
- History of Brazil
- Colonial Brazil
- Dutch Brazil

== Sources ==
- Marley, David (2008). Wars of the Americas: A Chronology of Armed Conflict in the New World, 1492 to the Present (2 ed.). Santa Barbara, USA: ABC-CLIO. ISBN 978-1-59884-100-8.
