= Floris Balthasar =

Floris Balthasarsz. van Berckenrode
- Born: 1562; Delft
- Died: December 10, 1616 (aged 53–54); Delft

Floris Balthasar, or Balthasarsz., sometimes Floris Balthasarsz. Van Berkenrode (1562 – December 10, 1616) was a Dutch goldsmith, engraver, surveyor and mapmaker.

Berckenrode was born in Delft. Little is known of his early years, but he married in Delft Dirckgen Zymonsdr. van Overvest on 10 February 1589, though she died the next year, as he married in Amsterdam Anna Thomas Claesdr. on 31 August 1590. In 1597, he signed his earliest print, in 1599 he was granted permission by Maurice, Prince of Orange to make a map of the Siege of Zaltbommel and in 1600 he was registered as quartermaster in Delft.

Berckenrode died in Delft and was buried 10 December 1616 in the Nieuwe Kerk, Delft. He was succeeded in his various activities by his sons Balthasar, Frans, and Cornelis, who presumably had all been his assistants, though mostly Balthasar as the eldest is known today.

Named maps by Floris Balthasars (since 1610 also in collaboration with his eldest son):

- The Siege of Bommel in 1599
- The Great Campaign of Maurice, Prince of Nassau, in Flanders Afbeeldinghe van den grooten tocht in Vlaenderen, Anno 1600, van de E.M. Heeren Staten Generael der Vereenichde Nederlanden, met haer Legher, onder 't beleydt van syn Princelicke Excellentie Mauritz van Nassau, etc., met warachtighe gelegentheyt van de steden ende dorpen, in dese Lantstreke gelegen
- The Siege of Grave in 1602
- The Siege of Ostend Caertgen van de belegering van Ostende, geamplieerd totten lesten dach, dat de Heer van Marquette (de laatste Gouverneur) uyttrock.
- Map of Sluis
- Battle of Gibraltar in 1607
- Siege of Gulick in 1610
- Map of Delfland in 10 folios
- Map of Schieland in 15 folios
- Map of Rijnland in 22 folios
- Plaat van het leger voor Rhees in 1614.
- Plaat van het leger voor Wesel 1614.
- De geheele gelegentheyt van den Rijnstroom metten appendentien van dien, van Wesel totten Tholhuys toe.
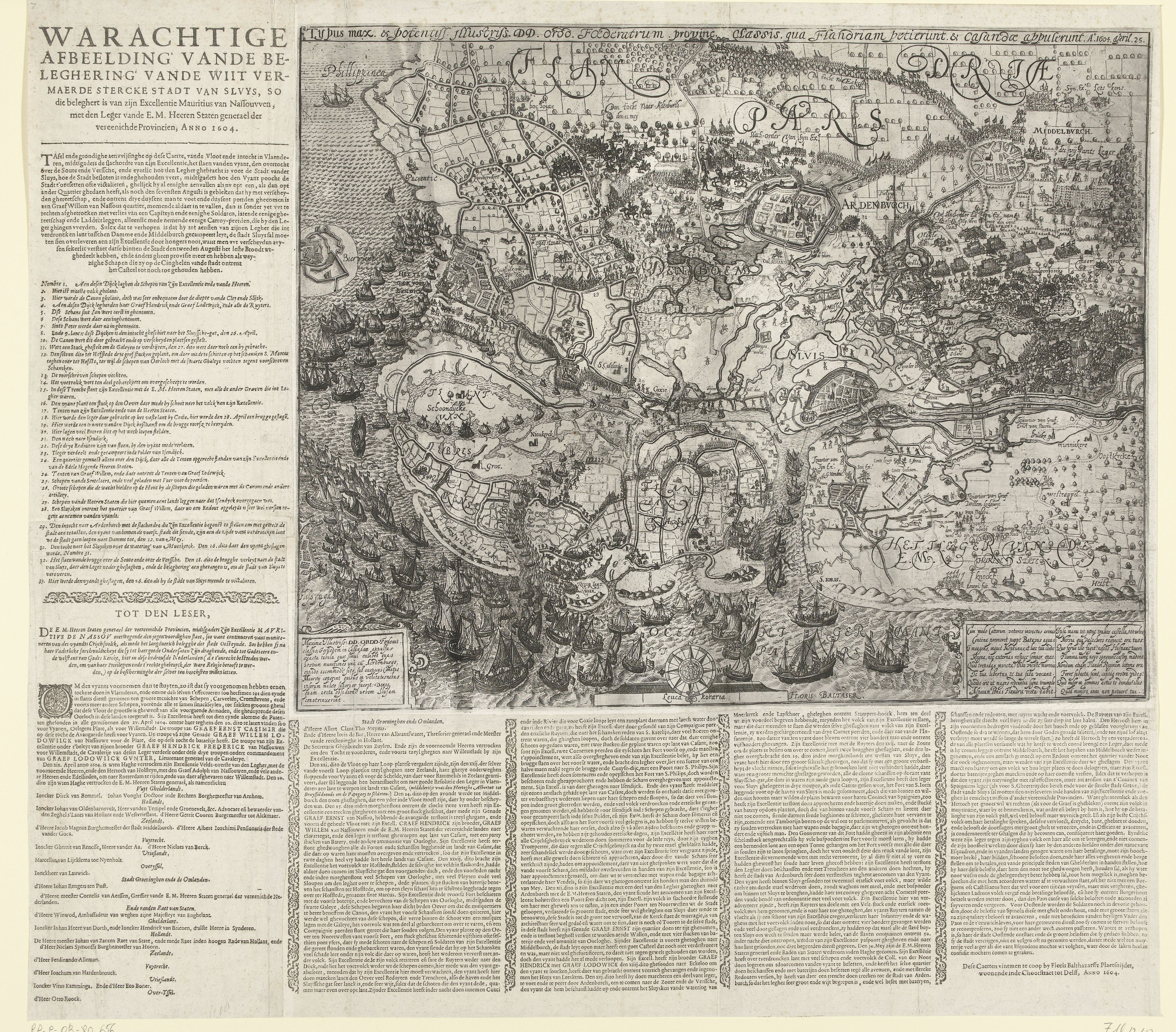
Map of the Siege of Sluis of 1604, by Floris Baltaser

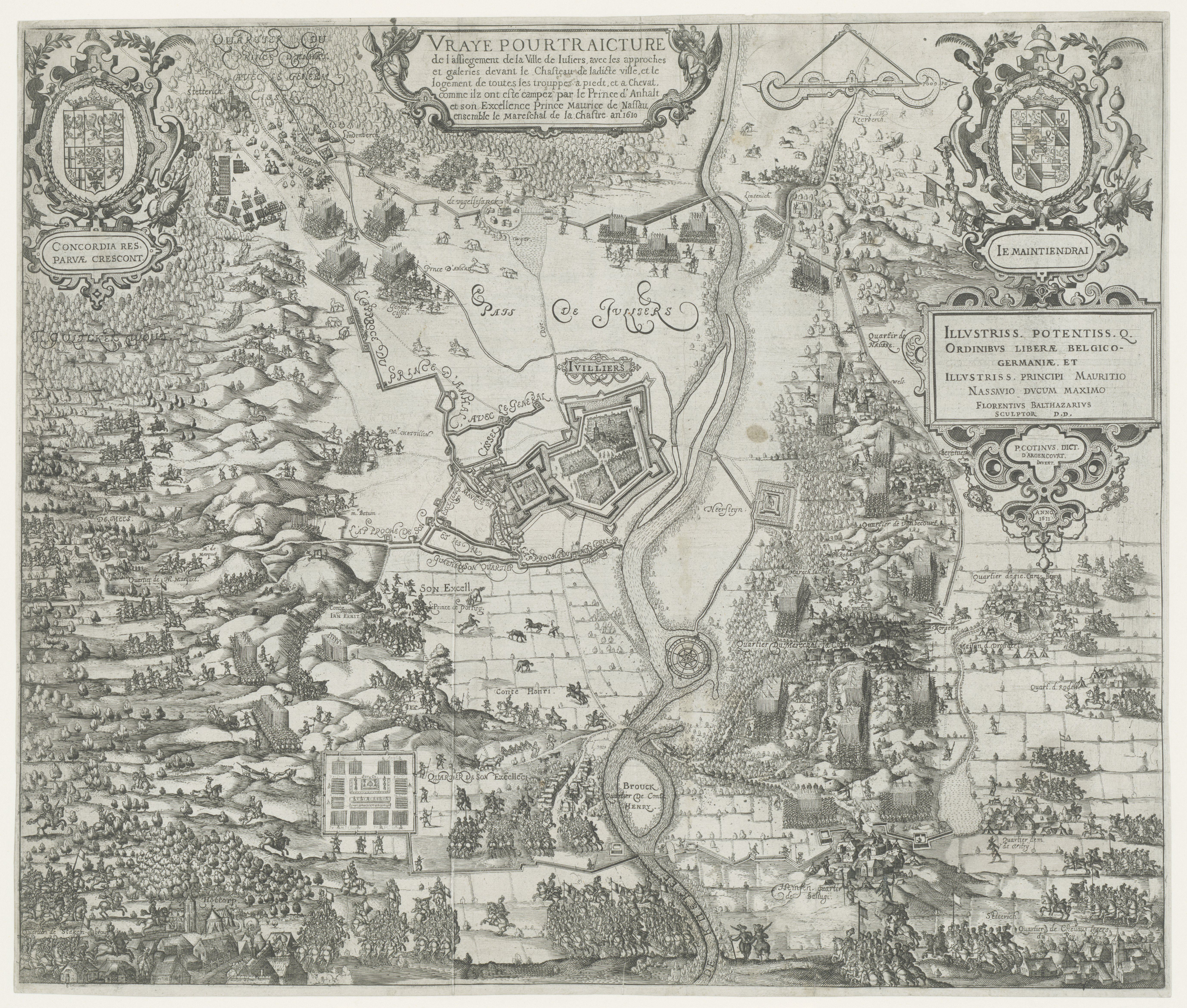
Vraye Pourtraicture de l'assiegement de la Ville de Juliers, 1610 version of the Siege of Gulick, by Balthasar Florisz. van Berckenrode

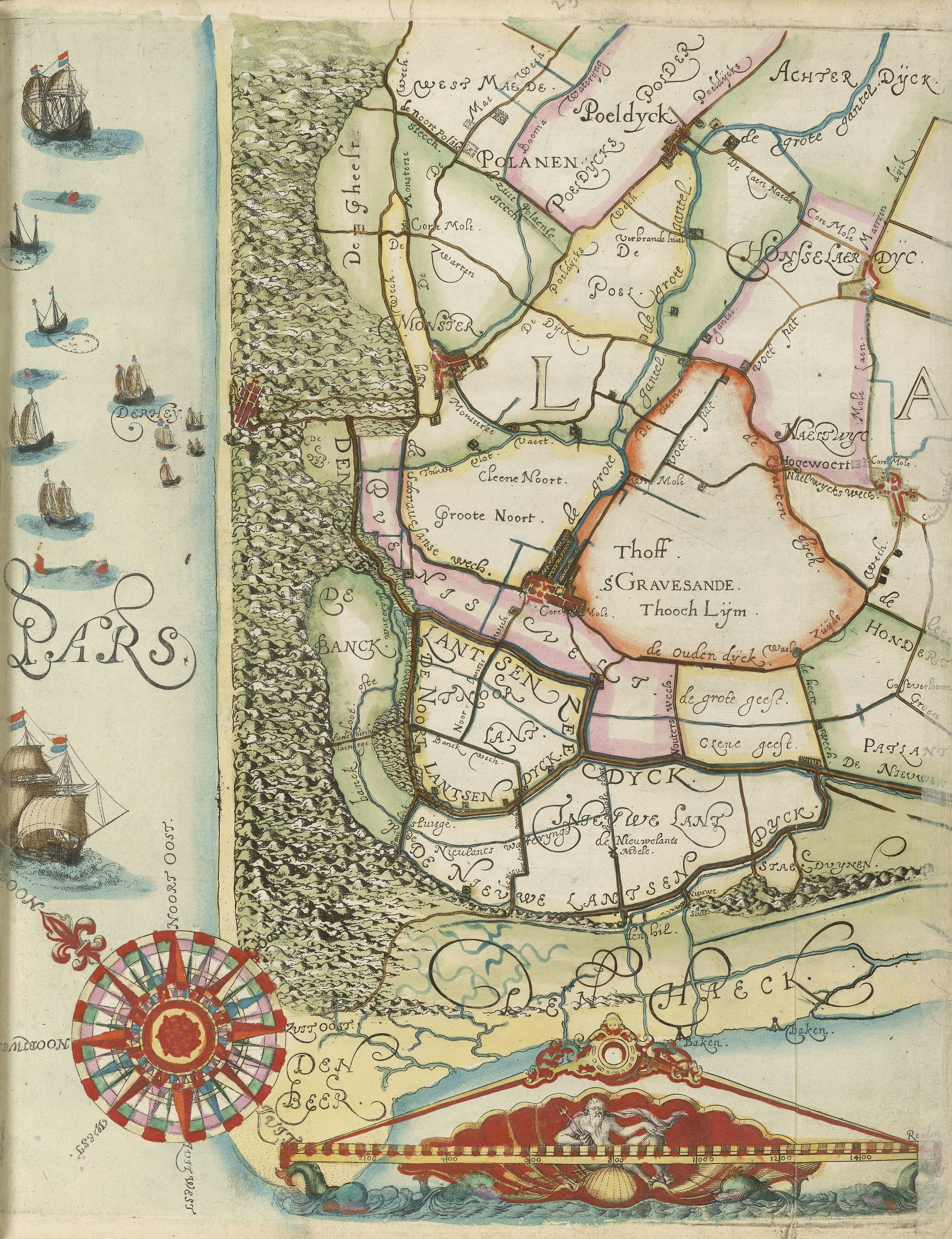
Westland folio with Monster, part of the 1611 map for the Hoogheemraadschap van Schieland
