= John Maurice, Prince of Nassau-Siegen =

Dutch soldier and administrator (1604–1679)

John Maurice of Nassau
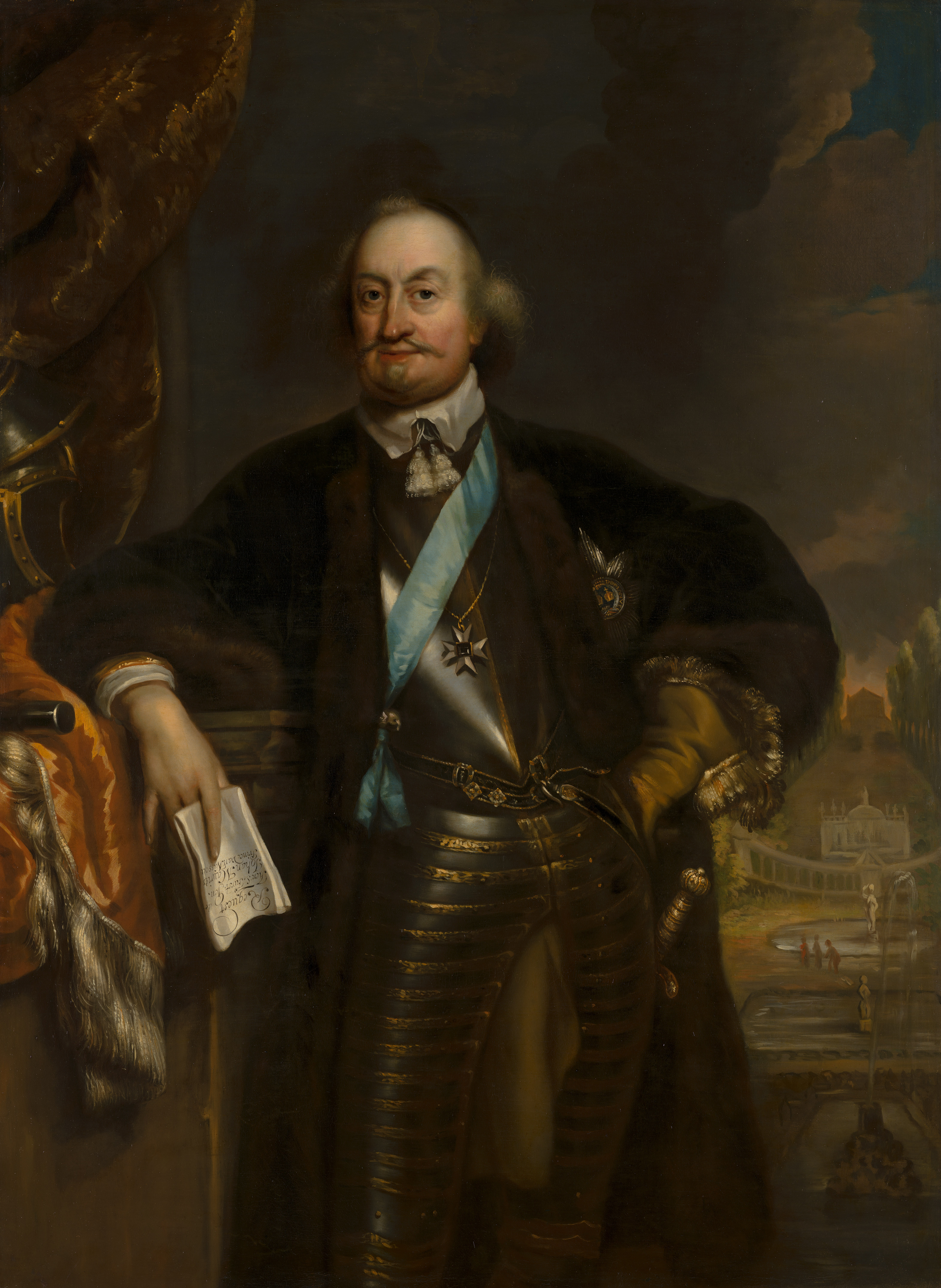
- Portrait by Jan de Baen, 1668

Prince of Nassau-Siegen (formerly Count of Nassau-Siegen)

Governor of Dutch Brazil
- In office 23 January 1637 – 30 September 1643

Personal details
- Born: 17 June 1604 Dillenburg, Holy Roman Empire
- Died: 20 December 1679 (aged 75) Kleve, Brandenburg-Prussia, Holy Roman Empire
- Parents: John VII, Count of Nassau-Siegen (father); Duchess Margaret of Schleswig-Holstein-Sonderburg (mother)
- Awards: Knight of the Elephant (1649)

Military service
- Allegiance: United Provinces
- Rank: Field Marshal
- Battles/wars: Eighty Years' War; Siege of Groenlo (1627); Siege of 's-Hertogenbosch (1629); Siege of Maastricht (1632); Siege of Schenkenschans (1636); Dutch–Portuguese War; Siege of Salvador (1638); Campaign of Porto Calvo; Second Anglo-Dutch War; Franco-Dutch War; Battle of Staphorst (1673); Battle of Zwartsluis (1673); Battle of Seneffe (1674)

John Maurice of Nassau (Dutch: Johan Maurits van Nassau-Siegen [ˈjoːɦɑ ˈmʌurɪts fɑ ˈnɑsʌu ˈsiɣə(n)]; German: Johann Moritz von Nassau-Siegen; Portuguese: João Maurício de Nassau-Siegen; French: Jean-Maurice de Nassau-Siegen; 17 June 1604 – 20 December 1679), called "the Brazilian" for his fruitful period as governor of Dutch Brazil, was Count and (from 1664) Prince of Nassau-Siegen. He served as Herrenmeister (equivalent to Grand Master) of the Order of Saint John (Bailiwick of Brandenburg) from 1652 until his death in 1679.

The former residence of John Maurice in The Hague, Netherlands, is now the home of the Royal Cabinet of Paintings, named Mauritshuis, which means "Maurice House" in Dutch.

== Early years in Europe ==
He was born in Dillenburg, and his father was John VII of Nassau-Siegen. His grandfather John VI of Nassau was the younger brother of Dutch stadtholder William the Silent of Orange, making him a grandnephew of William the Silent.

He joined the Dutch army in 1621, at a very early age. He distinguished himself in the campaigns of his cousin, the stadtholder Frederick Henry, Prince of Orange. In 1626, he became a captain. In 1629, he was involved in the capture of Den Bosch. In 1636, he conquered a fortress at Schenkenschans.

== Dutch governor in Brazil ==
Arms of John Maurice of Nassau, imposed upon the cross of the Johanniterorden and encircled by the Danish Order of the Elephant

He was appointed as the governor of the Dutch possessions in Brazil in 1636 by the Dutch West India Company on recommendation of Frederick Henry. He landed at Recife, the port of Pernambuco and the chief stronghold of the Dutch, in January 1637. Immediately after his arrival, he began a campaign against the Spanish-Portuguese forces, which he defeated in repeated encounters. Believing himself strong enough to hold his own, he dispatched part of his forces to attack the Portuguese possessions on the coast of Africa, and continued to extend his conquests with the aid of the natives who were opposed to Spanish rule, but he received a serious check in the attack on São Salvador, being obliged to raise the siege with the loss of many of his best officers. On receiving reinforcements in 1638, and with the co-operation of the Dutch fleet, which defeated the Spanish-Portuguese squadrons in sight of Bay of All Saints, he captured the latter city. When in 1640, Portugal recovered its independence from Spain under John II, 8th Duke of Bragança, the Prince of Nassau-Siegen, anticipating an alliance with the latter, and believing that a treaty of peace with Portugal would leave Holland in possession of the conquered territory, hastened his operations; to give occupation to the host of adventurers that had assembled under his colors, he dispatched an expedition against the Spanish possessions on Plate River, while in 1643, Johan Maurits equipped the expedition of Hendrik Brouwer that attempted to establish an outpost in southern Chile. Later, he visited the conquered provinces and arranged their administration.

=== Life in the settlements ===
By this series of successful expeditions, he gradually extended the Dutch possessions from Sergipe in the south to São Luís de Maranhão in the north. With the assistance of the famous architect, Pieter Post of Haarlem, he transformed Recife by building a new town adorned with public buildings, bridges, channels, and gardens in the then Dutch style, later naming the newly reformed town Mauritsstad, after himself. He was able to pay the high construction costs from the loot of his expeditions, and from the proceeds of his estates in Germany.

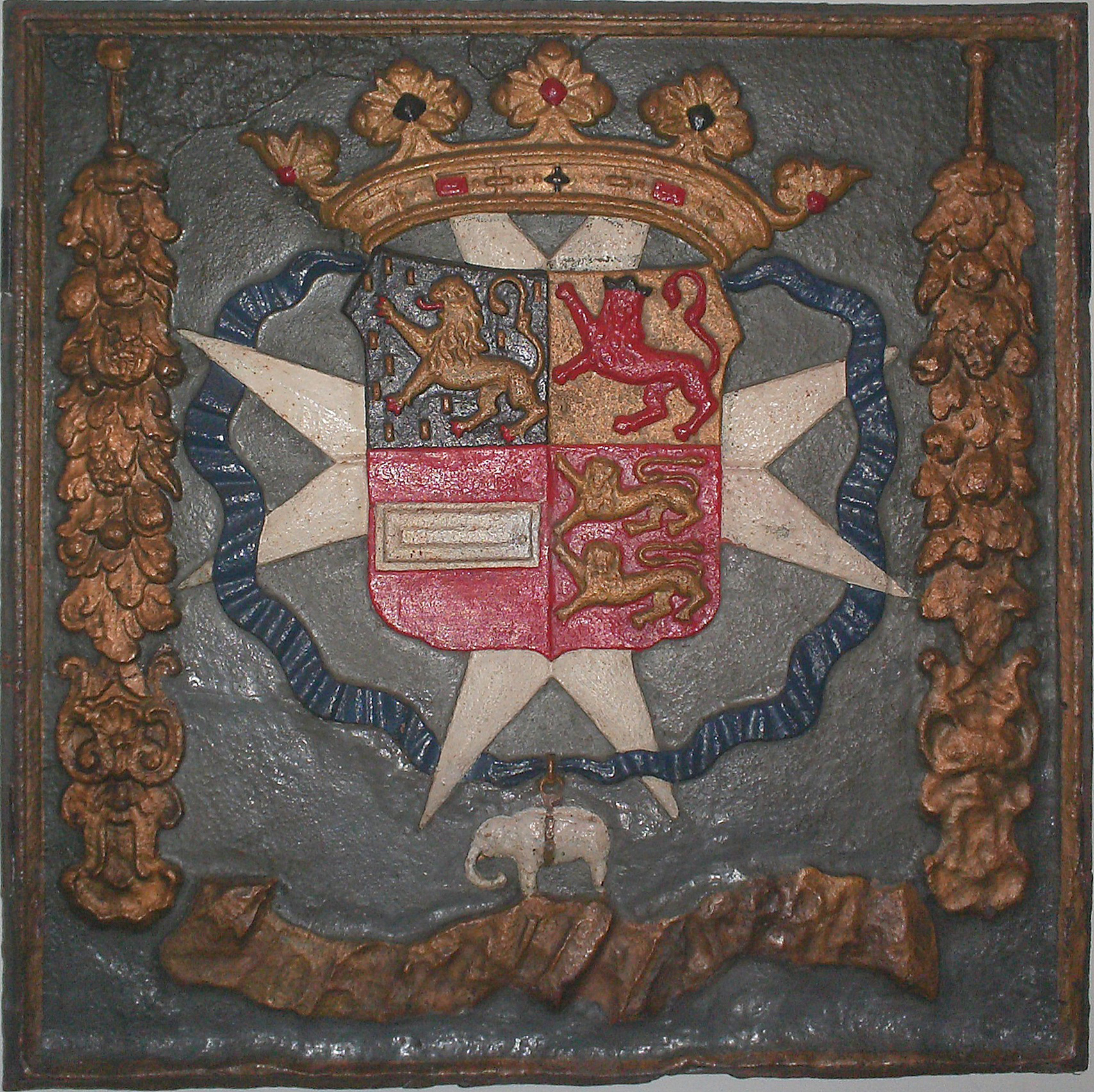
Brazilian depiction of arms of Johan Maurits

By his statesmanlike policy, he brought the colony into a most flourishing condition. His leadership in Brazil inspired two Latin epics from 1647: Caspar Barlaeus' Rerum per octennium in Brasilia et alibi nuper gestarum sub praefectura and Franciscus Plante's Mauritias. The painters Albert Eckhout, Frans Post, and Abraham Willaerts served as members of John Maurice's entourage.

He also established representative councils in the colony for local government, and developed Recife's transportation infrastructure. His large schemes and lavish expenditures alarmed the parsimonious directors of the West India Company, and John Maurice, refusing to retain his post unless he were given a free hand, returned to Europe in July 1644.

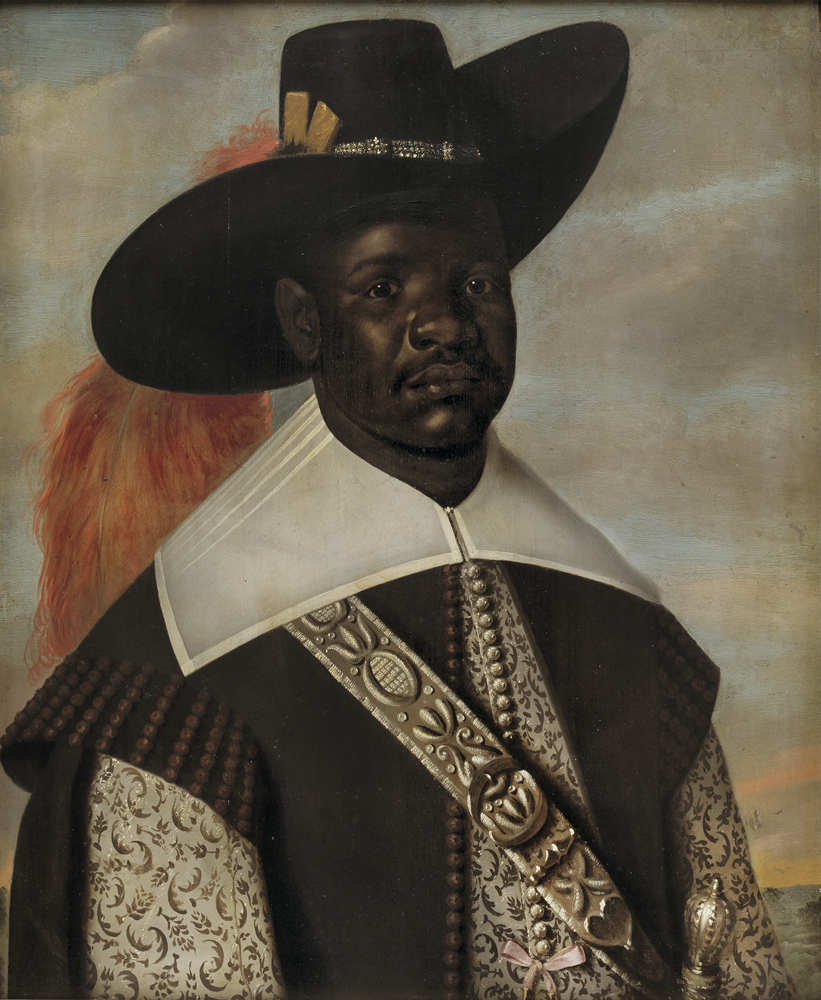
A portrait of Dom Miguel de Castro, Emissary of the Kingdom of Kongo to the court of Johan Maurits

As governor-general of a Brazilian colony setup by the Dutch West India Company from 1636 until 1644, Johan Maurice was both personally involved in keeping Africans slaves, and personally profited from the trade and transport of Africans to Brazil. In 1643, Nassau received an embassy from the Manikongo to strengthen the economic relations between the Kingdom of the Kongo and Dutch Brazil through the sale of slaves.

== Return to Europe ==
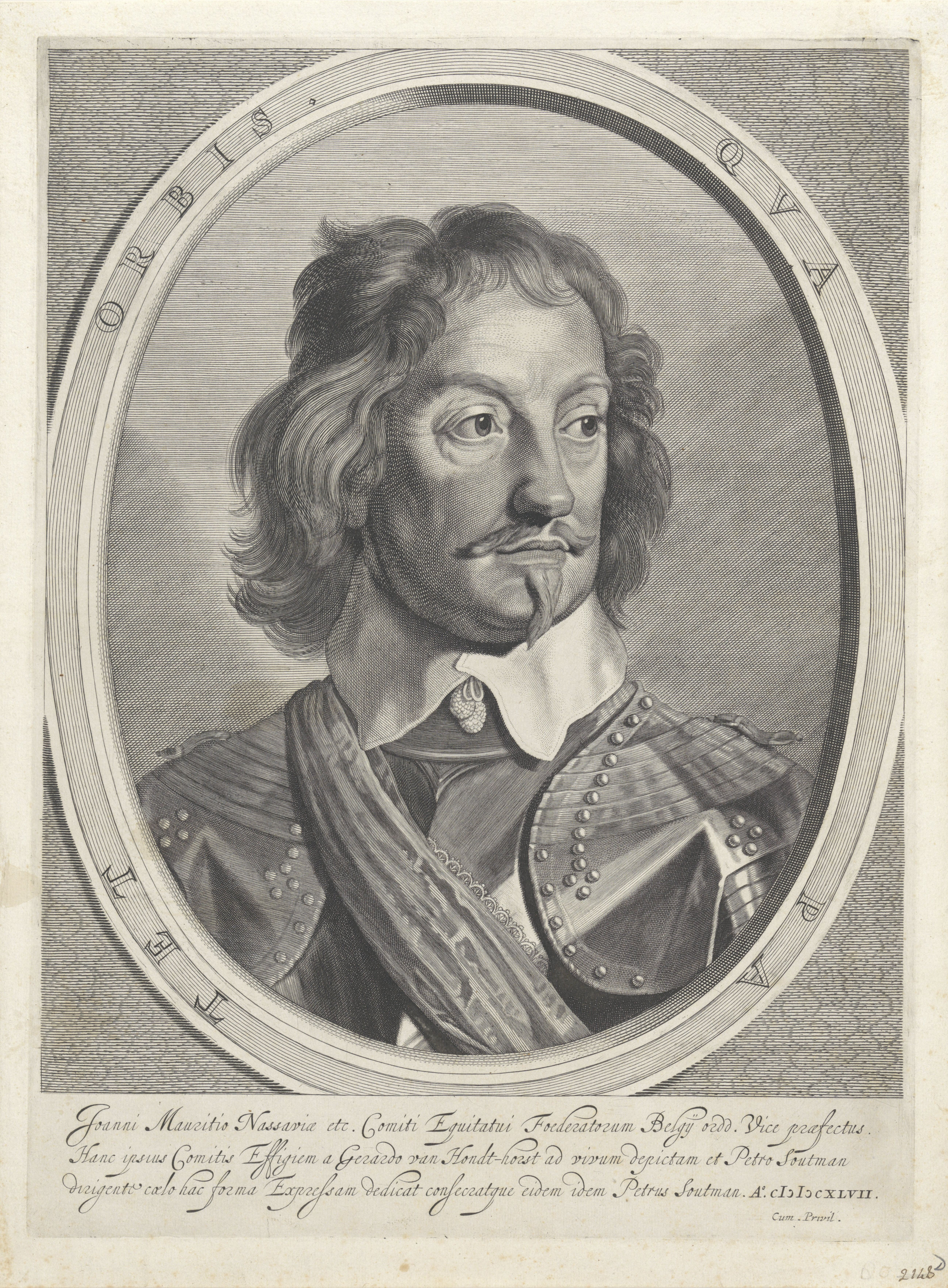
John Maurice of Nassau

Shortly after returning to Europe, John Maurice was appointed by Frederick Henry to the command of the cavalry in the Dutch army, and he took part in the campaigns of 1645 and 1646. When the war was ended by the Peace of Münster in January 1648, he accepted from Frederick William, Elector of Brandenburg (who had just married John Maurice's niece Louise) the post of governor of Cleves, Mark and Ravensberg, and later also of Minden. His success in the Rhineland was as great as it had been in Brazil, and he proved himself a most able and wise ruler. Also, he created large baroque gardens in and around Kleve, as well as a new residence, the Prinzenhof palace.

At the end of 1652, John Maurice was appointed head of the Order of Saint John (Bailiwick of Brandenburg) and made a prince of the Empire with the style of Serene Highness. In 1664, he came back to Holland; when war broke out with an England supported by the invading bishop of Münster, he was appointed commander-in-chief of the Dutch States Army. Though hampered in his command by the restrictions of the states-general, he repelled the invasion, and the bishop, Christoph Bernhard von Galen, nicknamed "Bommen Berend", was forced to conclude peace. His campaigning was not yet at an end, for in 1668, he was appointed first field-marshal of the States Army, and in 1673, he was charged by stadtholder William III to command the forces in Friesland and Groningen, and to defend the eastern frontier of the provinces, again against Van Galen. This he did with success and the troops of Von Galen were forced to withdraw. The next year John Maurice commanded troops against the French during the Battle of Seneffe.

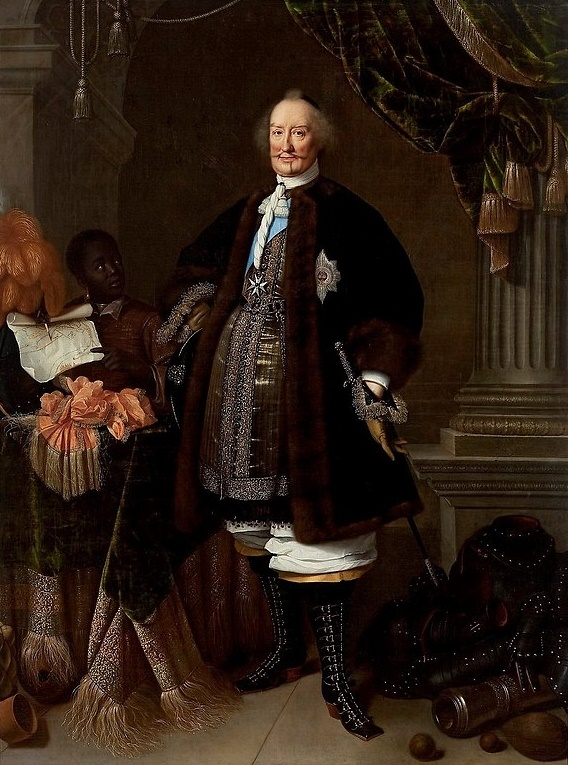
John Maurice of Nassau

In 1675, his health compelled him to give up active military service, and he spent his last years in his beloved Cleves, where he died in December 1679.

== Legacy ==
The residence he built in The Hague is now called the Mauritshuis, and houses the Royal Cabinet of Paintings. It is now a major museum of old Dutch paintings. In the National Library of Paris are two folio volumes containing a fine collection of colored prints of Brazilian animals and plants, which were executed by order of the prince, and accompanied with a short explanation by him.

He is said to have had an affair with Anna Gonsalves Paes de Azevedo.

Brazilian author Paulo Setúbal wrote a historic novel about John Maurice and the Dutch settlement in Brazil, O Príncipe de Nassau ("The Prince of Nassau", translated into Dutch by R. Schreuder and J. Slauerhoff in 1933 as Johan Maurits van Nassau).

Two ships of the Royal Netherlands Navy have been named after him.

John Maurice, Prince of Nassau-Siegen Born: 17 June 1604 Died: 20 December 1679
Preceded by Georg von Winterfeld, Landvogt der Neumark, Komtur zu Schivelbein	Herrenmeister (Grand Master) of the Order of Saint John; 1652–1679	Succeeded by Georg Friedrich, Fürst zu Waldeck, Graf zu Pyrmont
Government offices
Preceded by Sigismund van Schoppe	Governor of Brazilian Captaincy of Pernambuco; 1637–1644	Succeeded by Hendrik Hamel
