= Agnietenkapel =

Chapel of the Convent of Saint Agnes
- Agnietenkapel
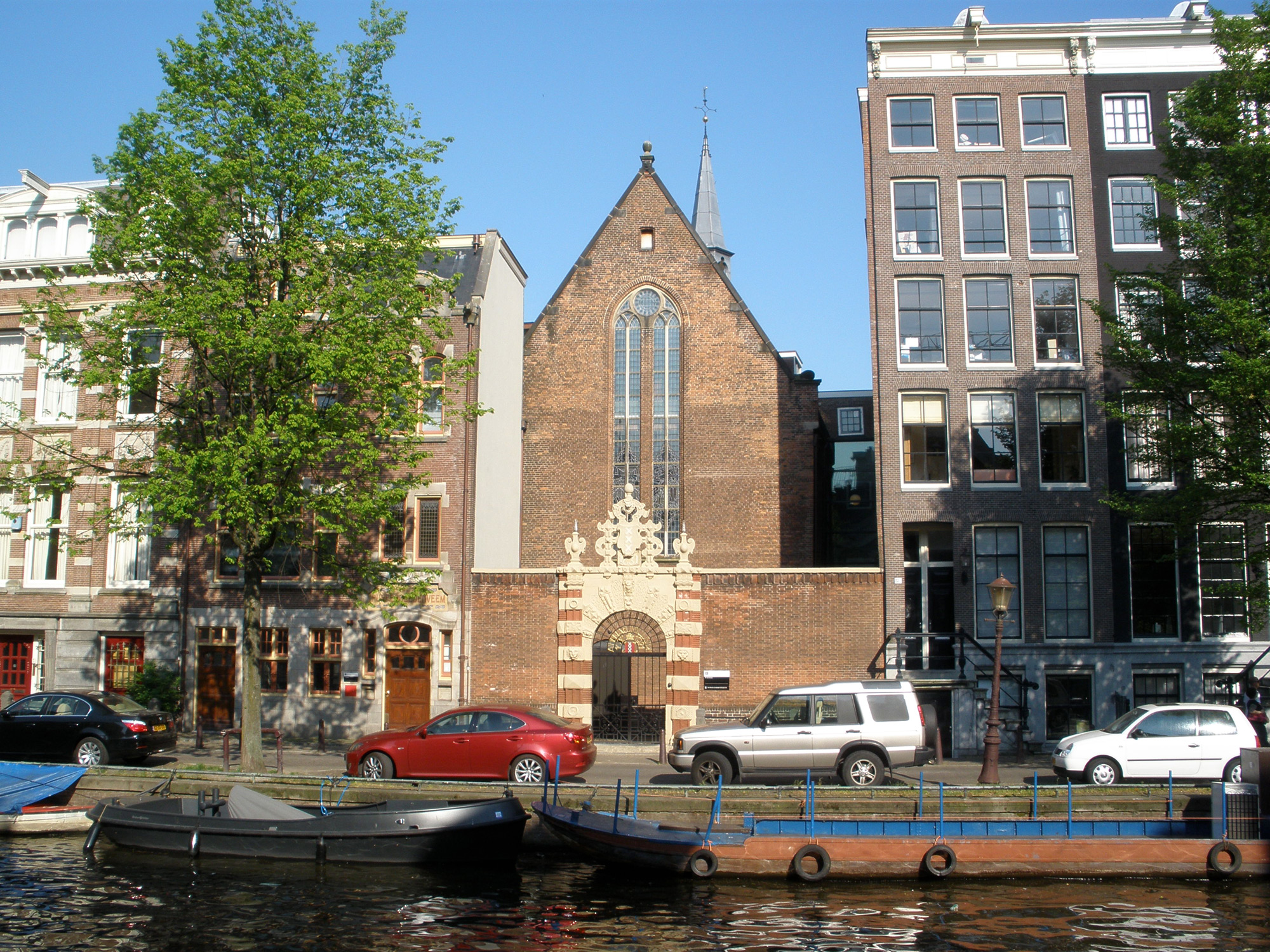
- Chapel of the Convent of Saint Agnes
- 52°22′10″N 4°53′44″E
- Location: Oudezijds Voorburgwal 231, Amsterdam
- Country: Netherlands
- Denomination: Deconsecrated
- Previous denomination: Roman-Catholic

Architecture
- Completed: 1470

The Agnietenkapel (Chapel of the Convent of Saint Agnes) is a 15th-century Gothic chapel in Amsterdam. It is the birthplace of the University of Amsterdam and still in use for doctoral dissertations and other university ceremonies, as well as academic events such as lectures and symposiums. The building has held rijksmonument status since 1970.

== History ==
=== Convent chapel ===
The chapel is located on the southern half of Oudezijds Voorburgwal canal, the so-called stille zijde ("quiet side"). In the Middle Ages this area was dominated by some 20 Roman Catholic monasteries and convents. The chapel was built in 1470 to replace an earlier chapel which burned down in the great fire of 1452. It was part of the Franciscan Agnietenklooster, a convent dedicated to Saint Agnes.

=== Athenaeum Illustre ===
After the Alteratie in 1578, when the Catholic city government was deposed in favor of a Protestant one, all monasteries and convents were closed and most were demolished. The Chapel of the Convent of Saint Agnes was one of the few Catholic buildings spared and given a new purpose. From 1631 the chapel was used as an institution of higher learning, the Athenaeum Illustre.

The Athenaeum Illustre served as an intermediate stage between Latin school and the university. It did not award academic degrees, as each province was allowed only one university, and Holland already had a university at Leiden. Gerardus Vossius and Caspar Barlaeus held their inaugural lectures as professors of the Athenaeum Illustre on 8 and 9 January 1632, respectively. Every morning from 9 to 11 o' clock, the professors gave public lectures in Latin in the large lecture hall on the first floor - the oldest lecture hall of Amsterdam.

The ground floor of the former chapel was used as an arsenal of the Admiralty of Amsterdam until the construction of 's Lands Zeemagazijn (now the National Maritime Museum) in 1656. In the chapel attic, a stadsboekerij ("city bookery") was opened in 1632, the predecessor of the current Amsterdam University Library. In the 19th century, the library had grown so large - and the building had become so derelict - that the library was moved to a different location.

When the Athenaeum Illustre outgrew the chapel, it moved in 1864 to the Handboogdoelen on the Singel canal, a former shooting range of the Amsterdam schutterij (civic guard).

=== University museum ===
Until 1919, the chapel housed a primary school. In 1921, the chapel underwent renovation. At that time, the gate of the former Stadstimmertuin ("city carpenters' workshop") on Nieuwe Doelenstraat was placed in front of the chapel. After the 1921 renovation, the chapel was repurposed by the university as a museum. Following the restorations in 2004-2007 the museum was closed and the collection became part of the Amsterdam University Library.

=== Restoration ===
During restoration and renovation in 2004–2007, the painted ceiling of the first-floor lecture hall by Willem Bogtman was restored to its original state, as were Bogtman's stained-glass windows. Additionally, the alleys on each side of the chapel were covered with glass and incorporated into the building. An elevator and other facilities were added to the adjacent Purperhoedenveem building. The chapel was officially reopened on 20 February 2007 by then-mayor Job Cohen.

== Gallery ==
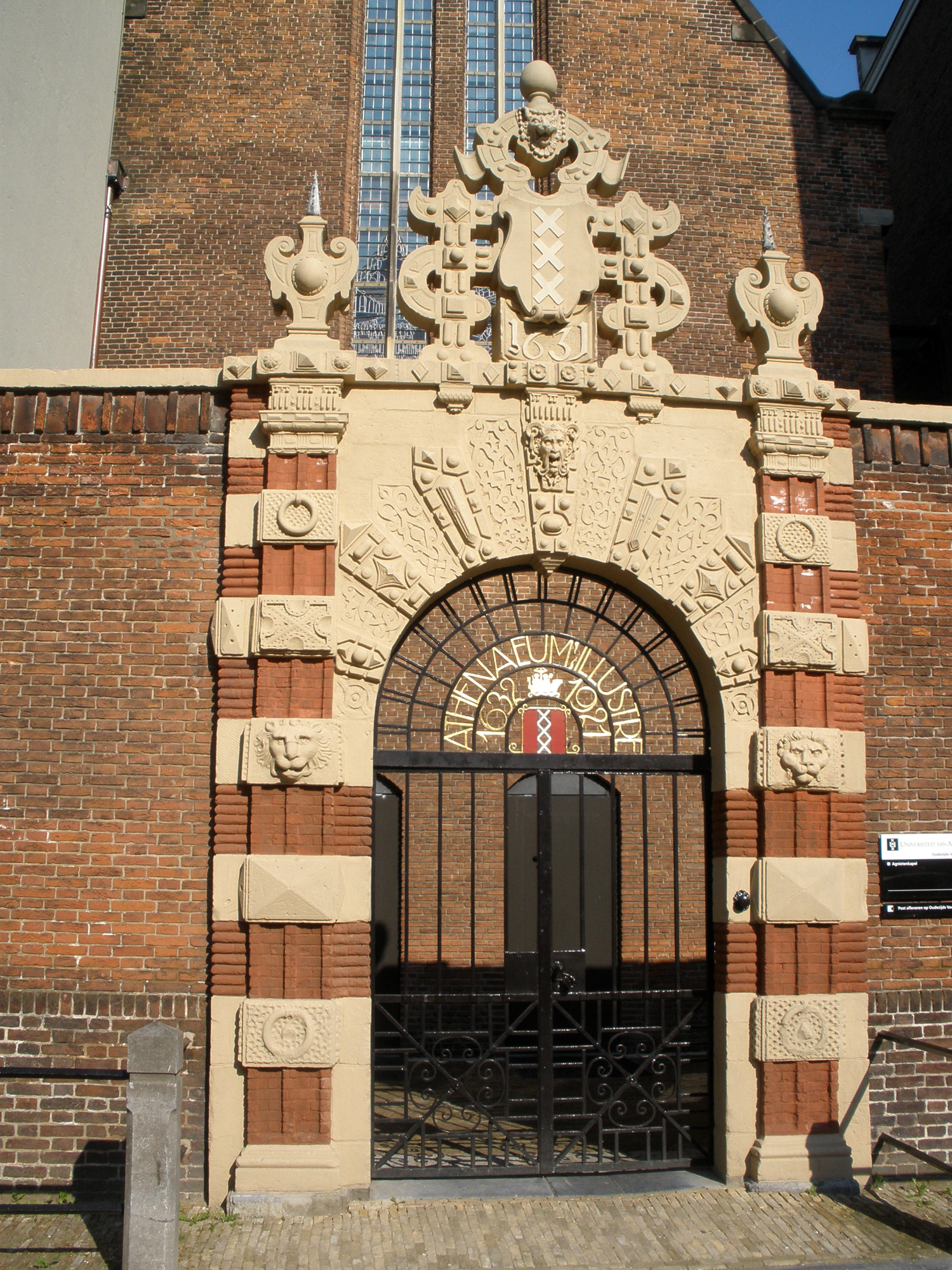
The chapel gate

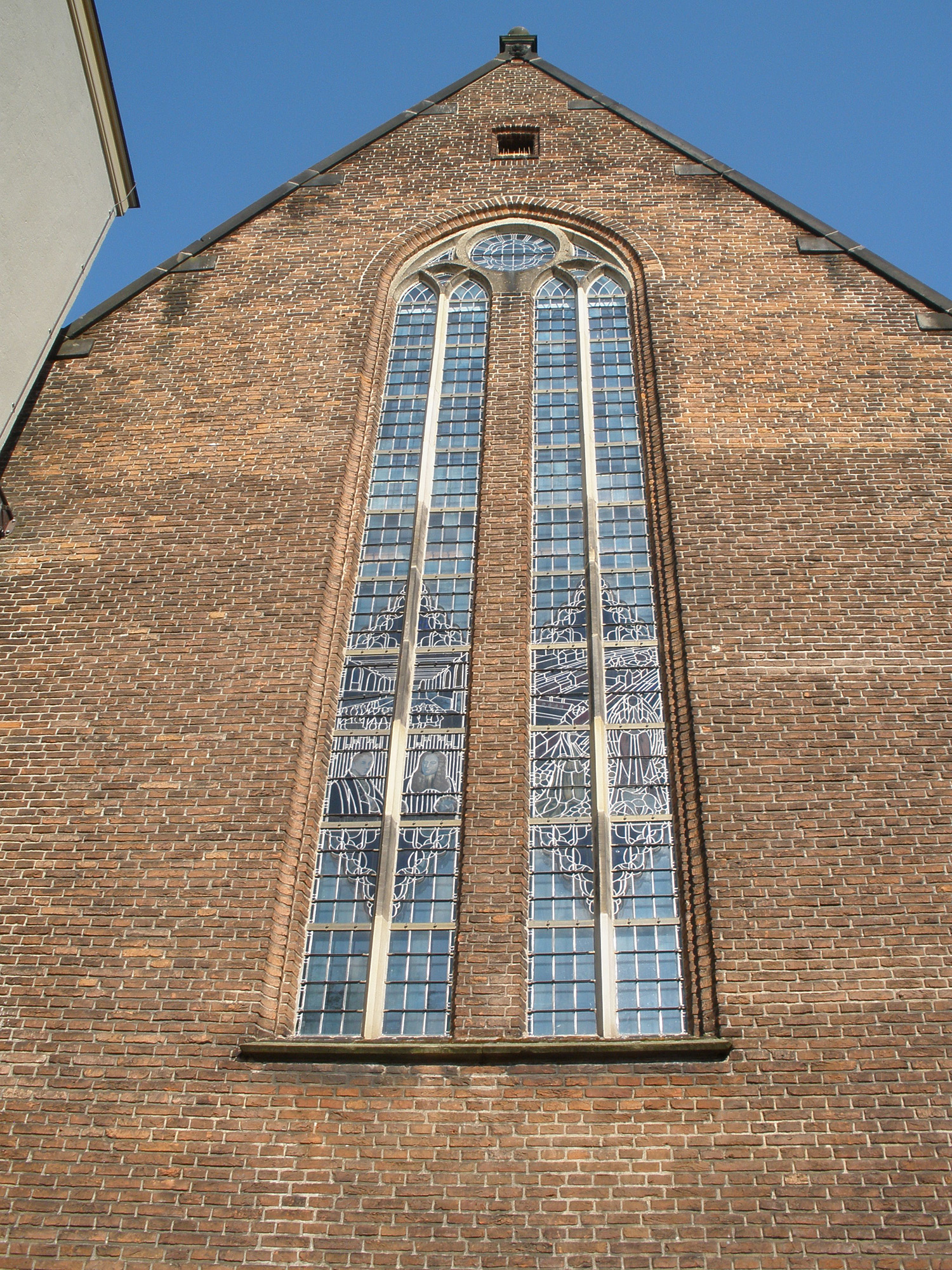
The stained-glass windows

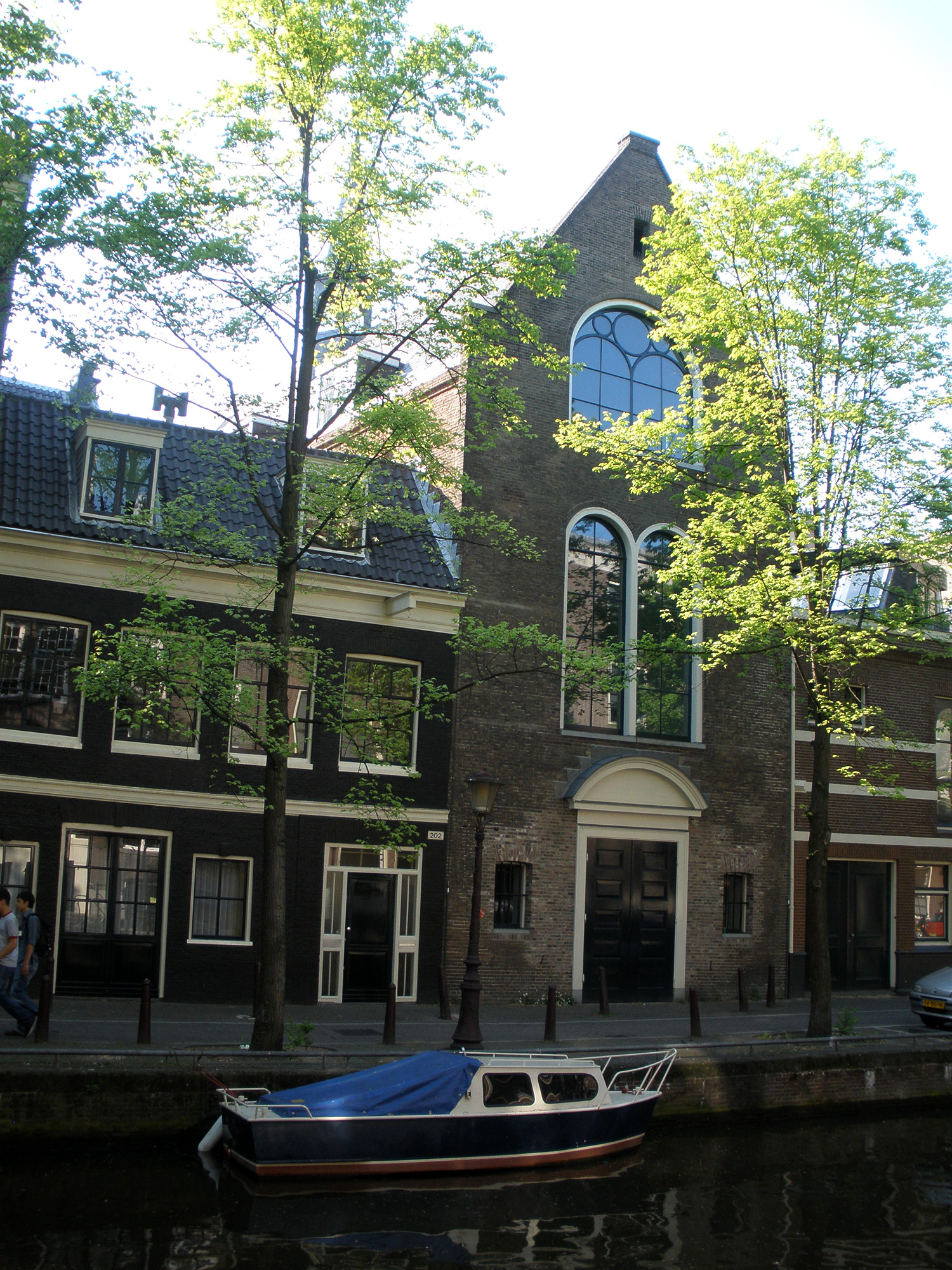
Back facade of the chapel on Oudezijds Achterburgwal canal

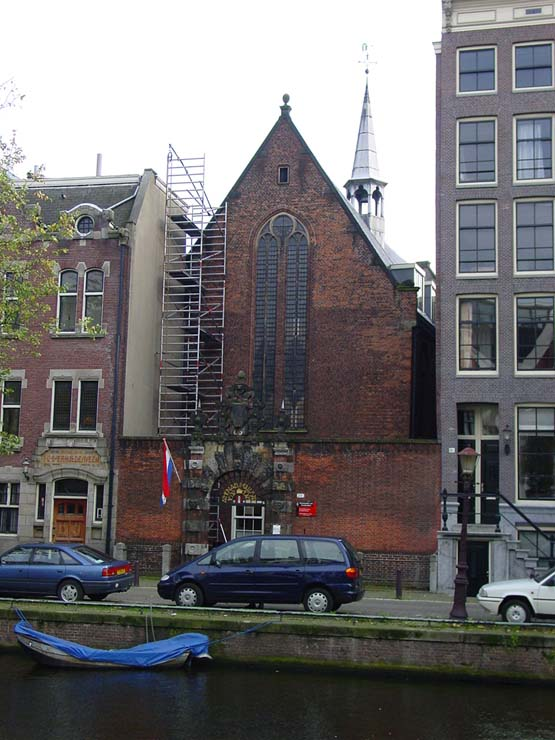
The chapel during the restorations in 2004-2007

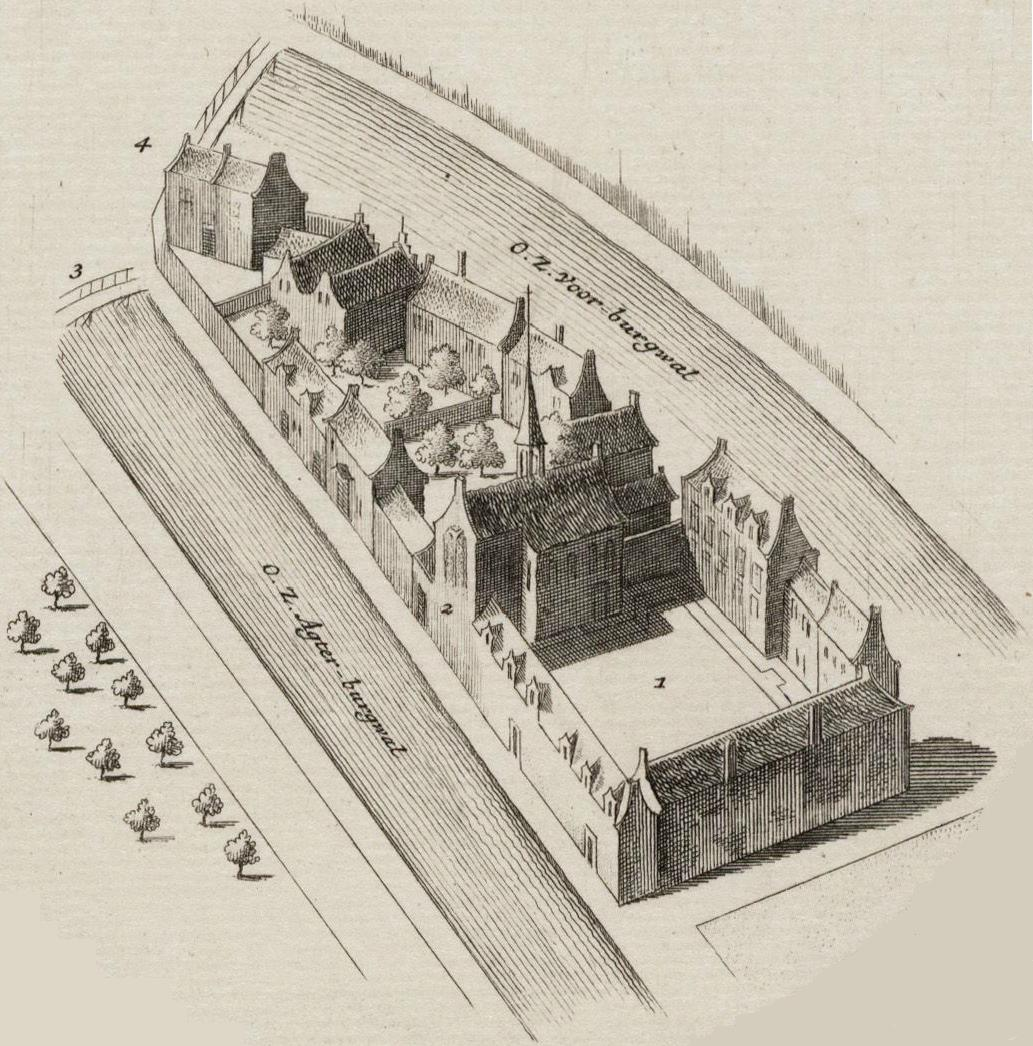
The chapel and associated convent depicted on a 1544 map.

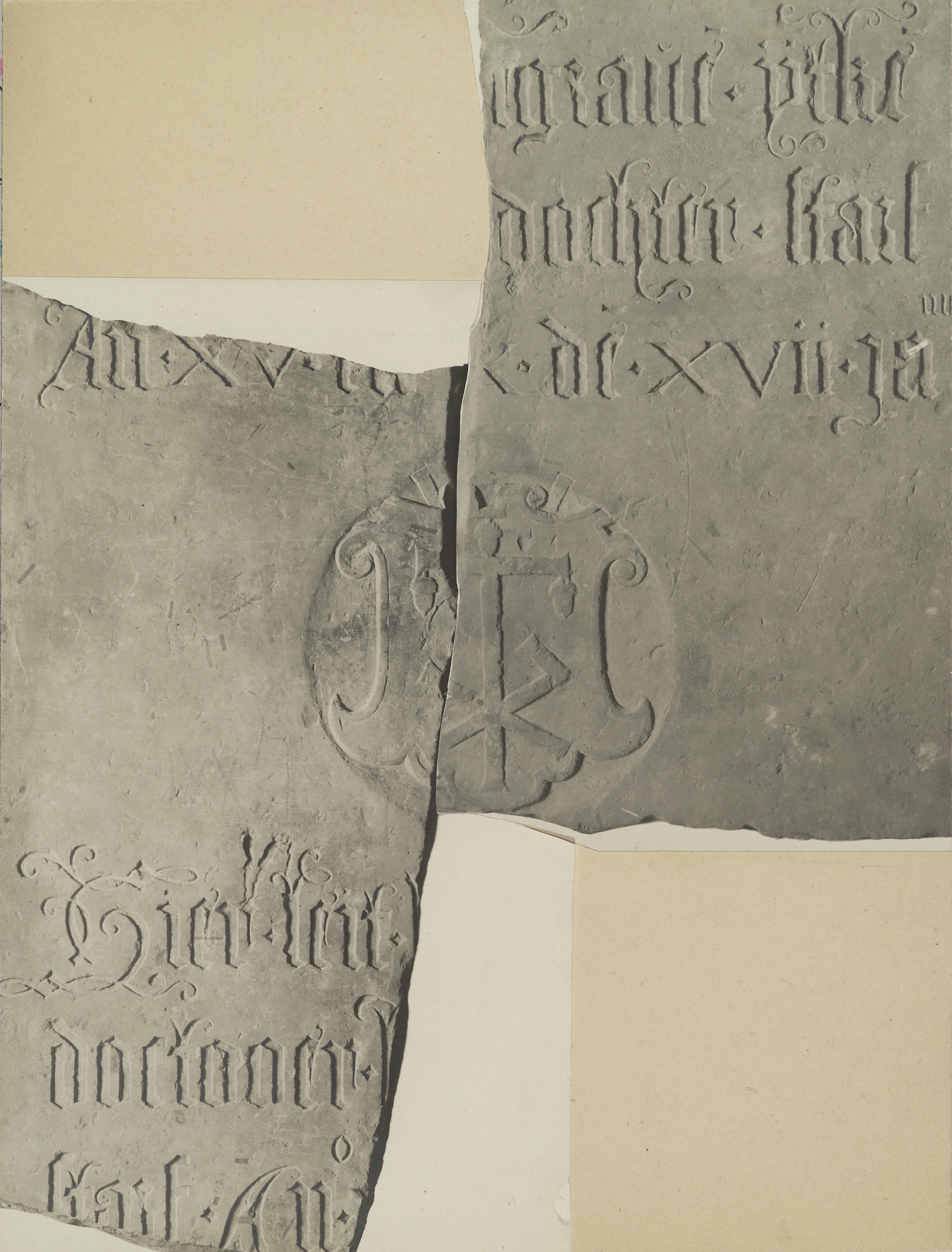
Part of a gravestone. The photo dates from 1919.

== Sources ==
- "Agnietenkapel | ARCAM" (archived)
- "Agnietenkapel - Gemeente Amsterdam" (Dutch) (archived)
- "Amsterdam Monumenten - Oudezijds Voorburgwal 231, Agnietenkapel" (Dutch) (archived)
- "De School Anno. Schoolgeschiedenis in beeld. De Agnietenkapel in Amsterdam door Bert Stilma" (Dutch) (archived)
