= Caspar Barlaeus =

Dutch polymath and Renaissance humanist (1584 –1648)

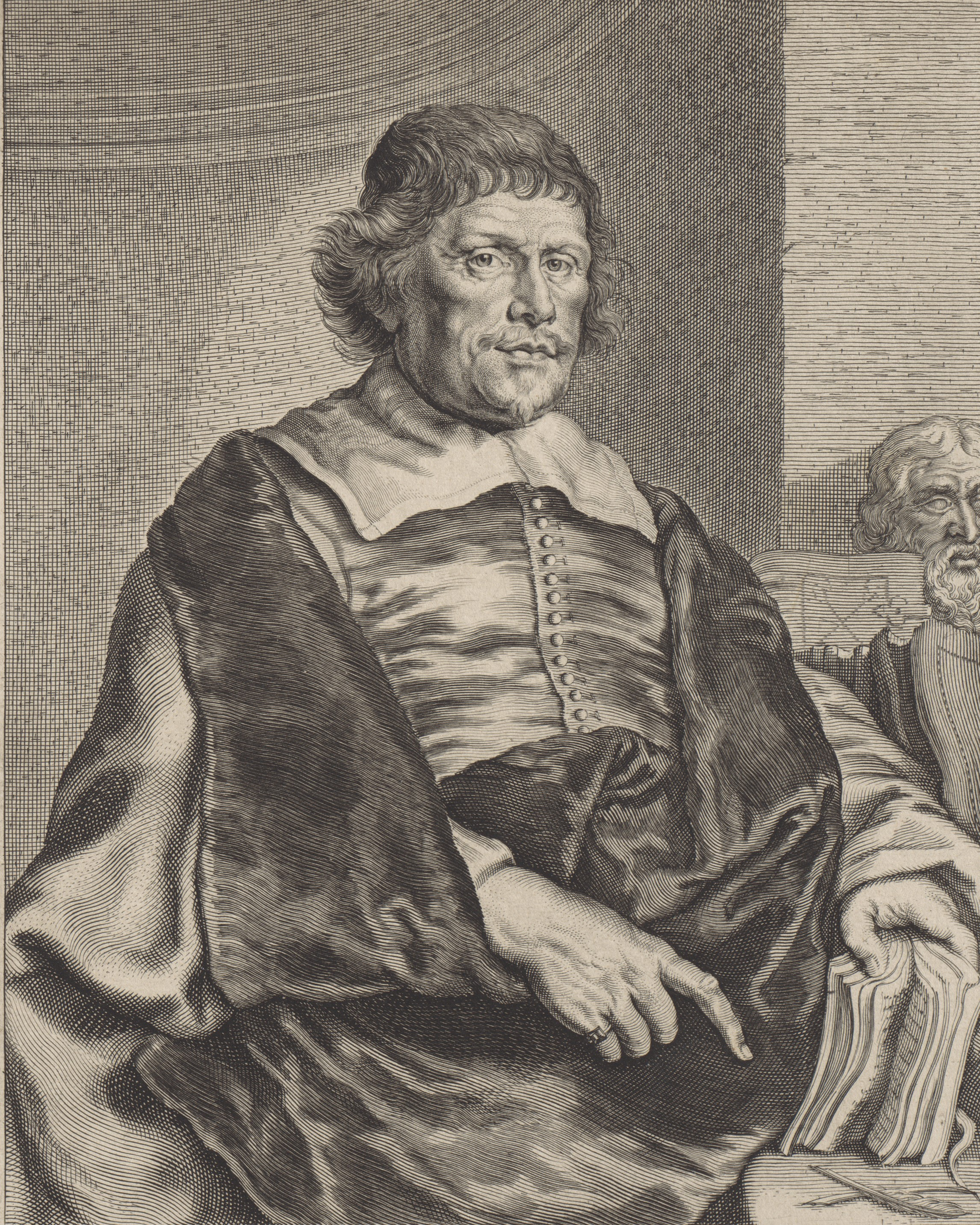
- Born: Caspar van Baerle; 12 February 1584; Antwerp, Habsburg Netherlands
- Died: 14 January 1648 (aged 63); Amsterdam, Dutch Republic
- Occupation: Poet

Caspar Barlaeus (12 February 1584 – 14 January 1648) was a Flemish polymath and Renaissance humanist, a theologian, poet, and historian.

== Life ==
Born Caspar van Baerle in Antwerp, Barlaeus' parents fled the city when it was occupied by Spanish troops shortly after his birth. They settled in Zaltbommel, where his father eventually would become head of the Latin school. Caspar studied theology and philosophy at the University of Leiden. After his study, he preached for 1.5 years in the village of Nieuwe-Tonge, before returning to Leiden in 1612 as an under-regent of a college. From 1617 he also was professor in philosophy at the university. Because of his remonstrant sympathies, he was forced out of this job in 1619. He then studied and graduated in medicines (in Caen), but never practiced professionally.

From 1631, he was professor of philosophy and rhetoric at the Amsterdam Athenaeum, Athenaeum Illustre), which is commonly regarded as the predecessor of the University of Amsterdam; the Athenaeum had its seat in the fourteenth-century Agnietenkapel. In January 1632, Barlaeus, along with Gerard Vossius, held his inaugural speech at the Amsterdam Atheneum. Barlaeus later encouraged Martinus Hortensius to lecture –and give an inaugural speech- at the same Institution. One of his huge patrons was Amsterdam burgomaster Andries de Graeff, his neighbor at Oudezijds Achterburgwal.

Barlaeus suffered from mental illness including the delusion that he was made of glass (the Glass delusion) though Gill Speak refers to his glass delusion as ‘unsubstantiated’.

== Writings ==
Barlaeus published many volumes of poetry, particularly Latin poetry. He also wrote the eulogy that accompanies the 1622 portrait of cartographer Willem Blaeu.

Barlaeus was involved in various aspects of cartography and history. He translated Antonio de Herrera's Description of the West Indies in 1622. In 1627, Barlaeus provided the text for the atlas of Italy created by Jodocus Hondius. In 1647, he wrote an account of the Dutch colonial empire in Brazil, inspired by the leadership of John Maurice of Nassau (Johan Maurits) at Recife. The Rerum per octennium in Brasilia et alibi nuper gestarum sub praefectura, as it is called, contains numerous maps and plates of the region. The engravings of Brazilian northeastern locales, fleets, battles, and maps were for 160 years the main references to Brazilian landscapes available in Europe, and are well known by Brazilians today as the most important examples of pre-national art. Franciscus Plante wrote a similar work in the same year called Mauritias, and included the maps already published in Barlaeus' work. These were maps of Ceará, Pernambuco, Paraíba, and Pernambuco Borealá. Plante also incorporated a portrait of John Maurice that had already been included in Barlaeus' work.

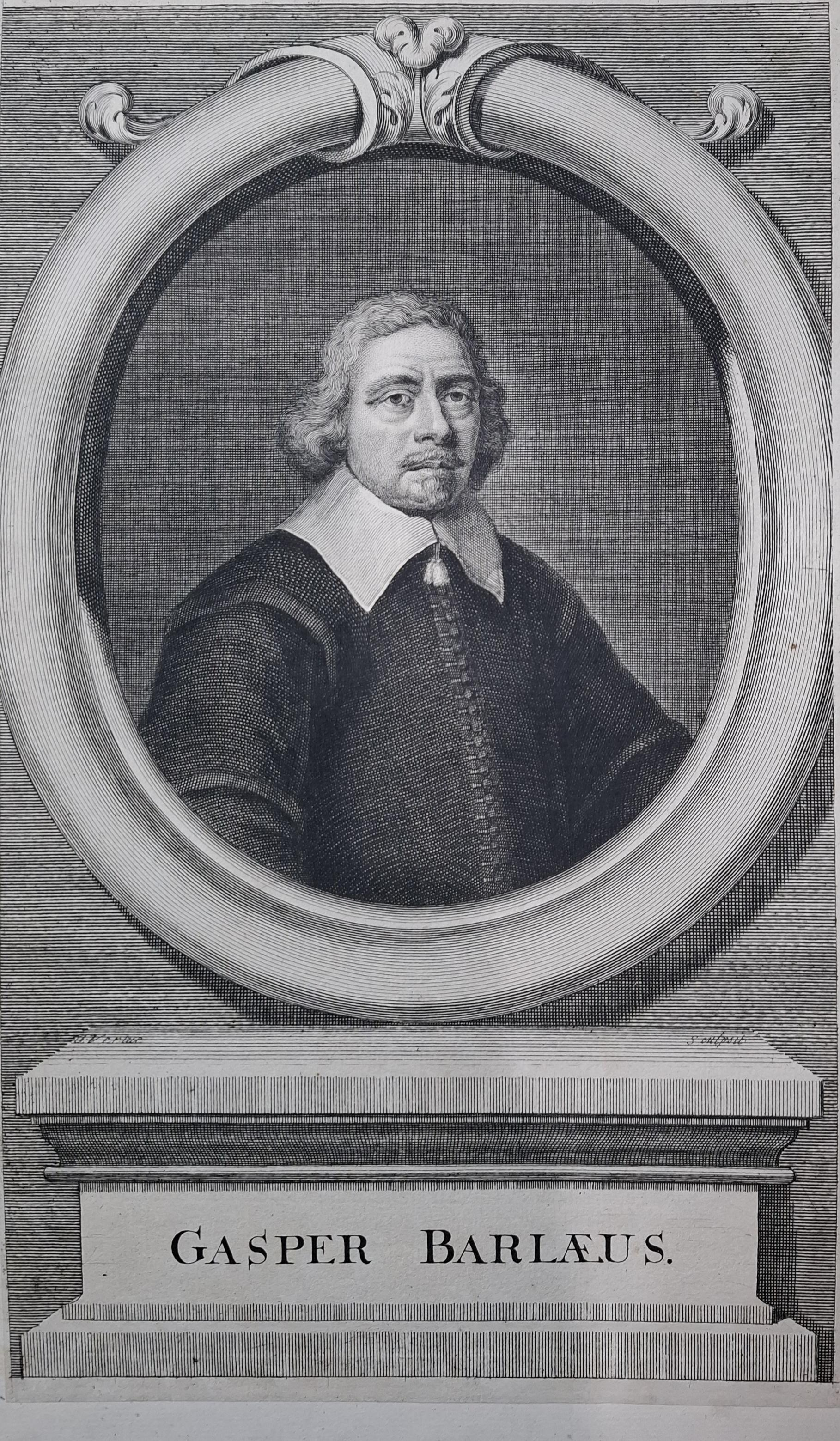
Casper Barlaeus appearing to be aged about 55.

In 1638, Barlaeus wrote Medicea Hospes, sive descriptio publicae gratulationis, qua ... Mariam de Medicis, excepit senatus populusque Amstelodamensis. Published by Willem Blaeu, it includes two large folding engraved views of the ceremonies on the occasion of the French queen mother Marie de Medici's triumphal entry into Amsterdam in 1638. Considered an important moment in Dutch history, Marie's visit lent de facto international recognition of the newly formed Dutch Republic. Marie de Medici actually traveled to the Netherlands as exile, but spectacular displays and water pageants took place in the city's harbor in celebration of her visit. There was a procession led by two mounted trumpeters; a large temporary structure erected on an artificial island in the Amstel River was built especially for the festival. This building was designed to display a series of dramatic tableaux in tribute to her once she set foot on the floating island and entered its pavilion.

== Death and legacy ==
Barlaeus died at Amsterdam. Franciscus Plante wrote Barlaeus' obituary and epitaph in 1648.

Barlaeus Gymnasium, in Amsterdam, is named after him. There is a Van Baerle Street in both Amsterdam and Nieuwe-Tonge.

== Works ==
- Manes Auriaci (1625)
- Hymnus ad Christum (1628)
- Poemata (1628)
- Medicea hospes (1638)
- Faces augustae (1643)
- Rerum in Brasilia et alibi gestarum (1647)
- Verscheyde Nederduytsche gedichten (1651)
- Mercator sapiens, sive Oratio de coniungendis mercaturae et philosophiae studiis

== Sources ==
- (in English) Barron Maps, barron.co.uk
- (in Dutch and Latin) Barlaeus: Bibliographia (full bibliography), let.leidenuniv.nl
- (in Dutch and Latin) Biography and Works: Caspar Barlaeus, dbnl.org
- (in Latin) Barlaeus Poemata (full index and texts of Barlaeus' poetry), let.leidenuniv.nl
- (in Latin) Plante's obituary and epitaph, let.leidenuniv.nl
- (in English) Festival Books, libraries.rutgers.edu
- (in Portuguese) Historia naturalis Brasiliae, pernambuco.com
