= Casa Forte =

Brazilian neighborhood

- Neighborhood of Recife
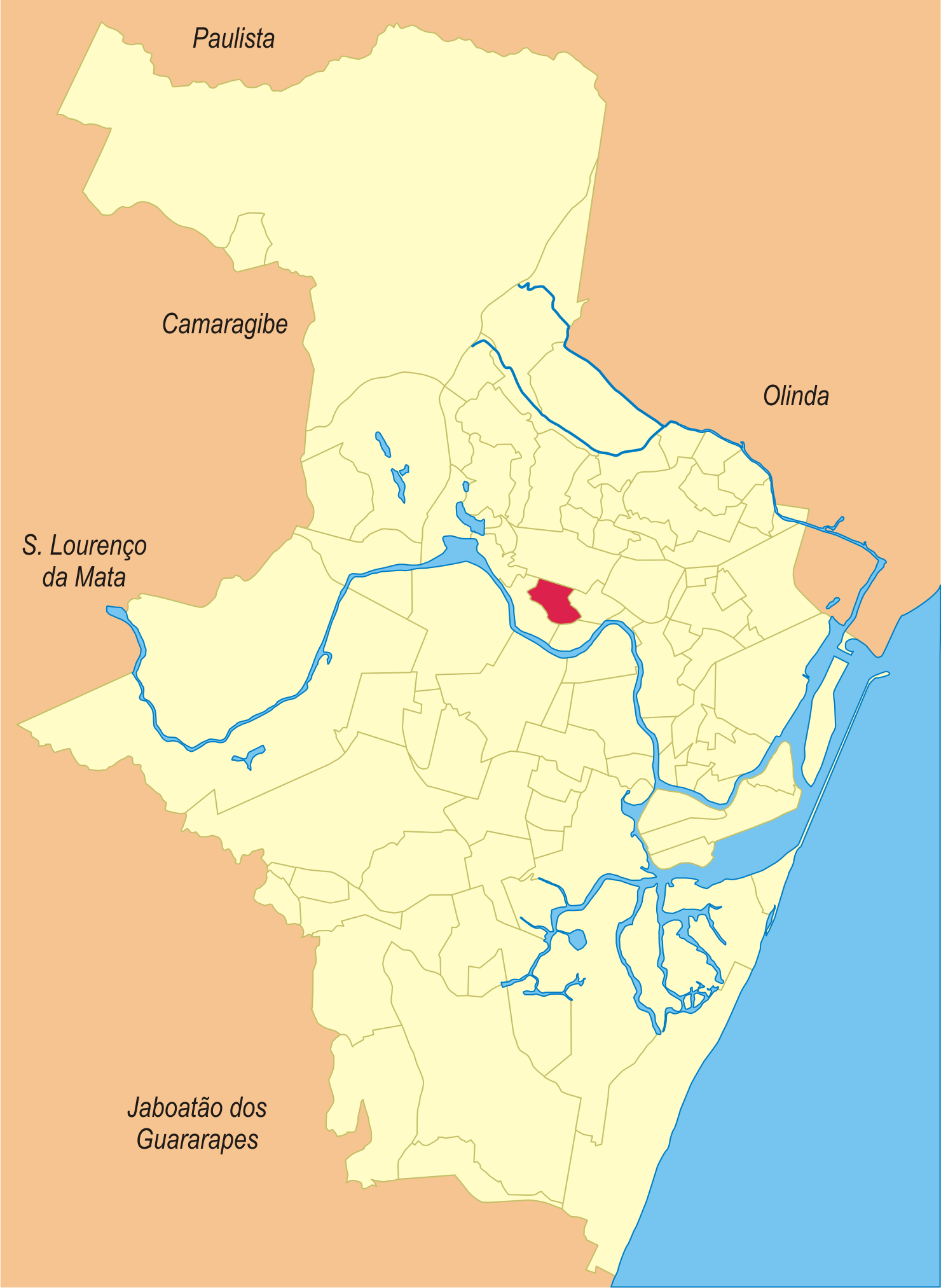
- Location of the Casa Forte neighborhood in Recife

- Location in Pernambuco
- Coordinates: 08°02′00″S 34°55′08″W
- Country: Brazil
- State: Pernambuco
- Municipality/City: Recife
- Zone: RPA 3

Area
  - Total: 0.56 km^{2} (0.22 sq mi)

Population
  - Total: 6 750
  - Density: 120.24/km^{2} (311.4/sq mi)

Casa Forte is a neighborhood in the North Zone of Recife, Pernambuco, Brazil.

== History ==
In the 16th century, a mill was established by Diogo Gonçalves on a piece of land donated by Duarte Coelho, donatário of the Captaincy of Pernambuco. The site had several owners and names over the years, such as Jerônimo Gonçalves, Isabel Gonçalves, Anna Paes, Tourlon, Nassau, de With and, from 1645, Casa Forte. Located on the left bank of the Capibaribe River, the mill operated on animal power. The sugar obtained was stored and transported across the river to the market in Recife. The sugar mill houses, together with the chapel dedicated to Our Lady of Necessities, were located in a space popularly called Campina de Casa Forte, now known as Casa Forte Square (Praça de Casa Forte).

On August 17, 1645, the site witnessed the Battle of Casa Forte, fought to free ladies from Pernambuco who were imprisoned by the Dutch in the big house of Anna Paes' mill. To commemorate the victory, a plaque was installed at the site with the names of the liberators: João Fernandes Vieira, André Vidal de Negreiros, Henrique Dias and Antônio Filipe Camarão.

The big house became known as Casa Forte, a name later extended to the neighborhood. The 17 de Agosto Avenue, the main thoroughfare in the area, pays homage to the day of the victory of the people of Pernambuco over the Dutch. In 1810, the mill was acquired by Father José Inácio Ribeiro de Abreu e Lima, who demolished the old big house and built a new residence on the same site, but later abandoned it.

In 1907, the French sisters of the Congregation of the Holy Family acquired the property and established a girls' school on the site in 1911. The old chapel of the mill, built in 1672, remained in ruins and its images were transferred to the Parish Church of Our Lady of Health, in Poço da Panela, until 1909, when it was restored. After being rebuilt, the chapel was consecrated in October 1911 as the Mother Church of the parish of Casa Forte, devoted to the Sacred Heart of Jesus. The church is fronted by the Casa Forte Square, which was designed by architect Burle Marx and contains several species of tropical plants, including some from the Amazon.

Casa Forte is considered one of Recife's most wooded neighborhoods. It preserves some old buildings, such as the former Magiot Hospital (Hospital Magiot), which belonged to Francisco Ribeiro Pinto Guimarães and currently houses the headquarters of the Joaquim Nabuco Foundation (Fundação Joaquim Nabuco); the Museum of the Man of the Northeast (Museu do Homem do Nordeste) and the Laboratory for Research, Conservation and Restoration of Documents and Works of Art (Laboratório de Pesquisa, Conservação e Restauração de Documentos e Obras de Arte - Laborarte).

== See also ==
- History of Pernambuco
