= Poço da Panela =

Neighborhood in Recife, Brazil

Coordinates: 8°02′S 34°56′W

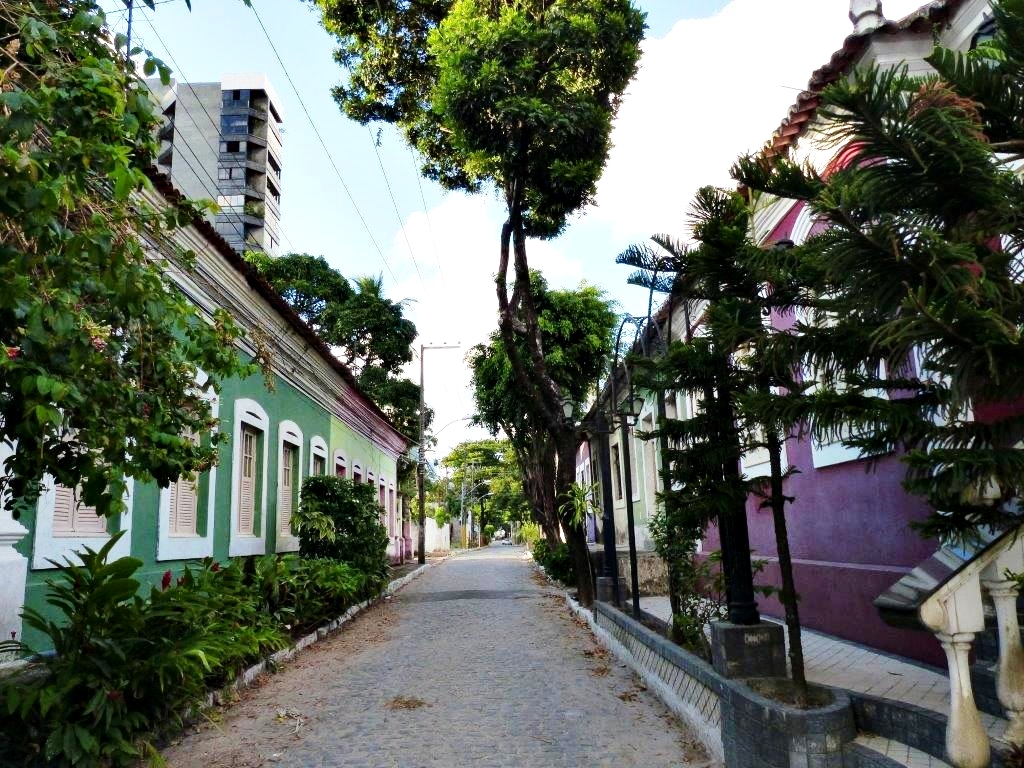
Poço da Panela, 2014

Poço da Panela is a neighborhood of Recife, Brazil located in the north of the city. It has a land area of 81 hectares, a resident population of 4,615 people and an Geometric Average Annual Population Growth Rate (2000/2010): 1.43 (%). Adjoining neighborhoods are 'Casa Forte', 'Santana' and 'Monteiro', and it runs along the Capibaribe River. The majority of its residents are upper-middle class, although there are also residents of lower middle class and upper class.

== Main streets ==
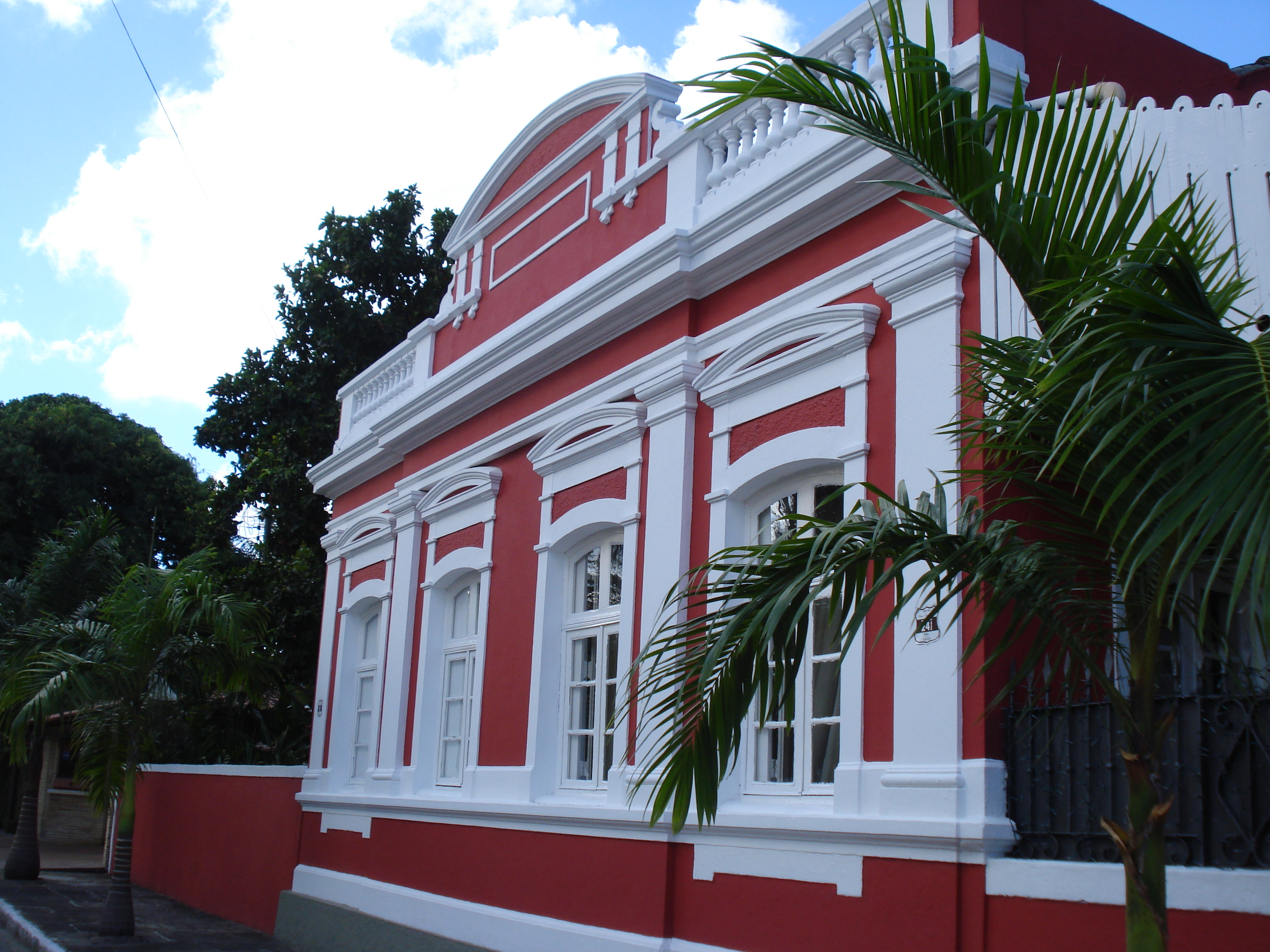
House in Poço da Panela -Poço's Royal Road(Estrada Real do Poço)

- Estrada Real do Poço
- Rua Dona Olegarinha da Cunha
- Rua Luiz Guimarães
- Rua Dos Arcos
- Rua Oliveira Góes
- Rua do Chacon

== See also ==
- Recife
- Pernambuco
- Brazil
