= Doelen Hotel =

Hotel in Amsterdam, the Netherlands

Coordinates: 52.3682°N 4.8958°E

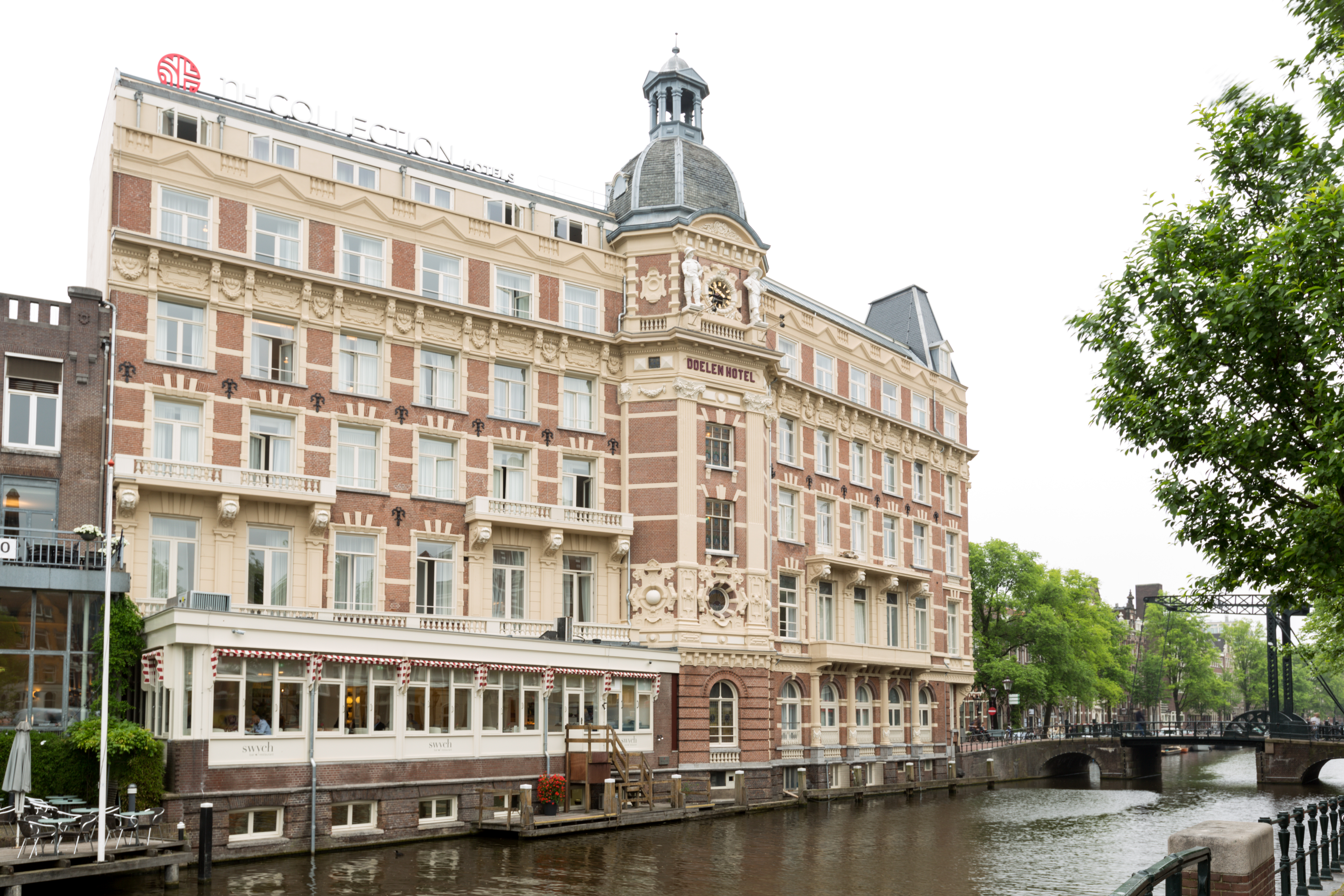
Tivoli Doelen Amsterdam on the Amstel

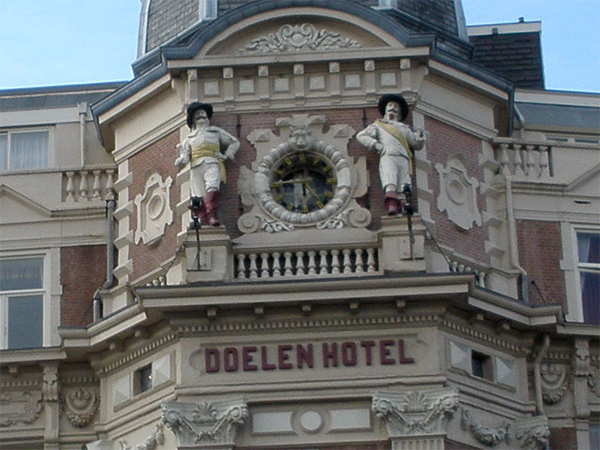
Detail of the tower with city guard shown

Tivoli Doelen Amsterdam Hotel is a historic hotel in the Binnenstad (historic centre) of Amsterdam, the oldest hotel in the city. It is located on the Binnen-Amstel (inner Amstel) at the southern end of the Kloveniersburgwal. The entrance is at Nieuwe Doelenstraat 24.

The hotel completed in 1883, was designated in 2001 as a rijksmonument (Dutch national heritage site). The best-preserved part of the interior is the central hall with marble stairs and balustrade and artwork by artist Gerrit Hendrik Heinen^{nl}.

== History ==
The tower named Swych Utrecht^{nl}, part of the Amsterdam city walls and defence system. It was part of the Kloveniersdoelen, the gathering and shooting place for the city militia/guard known as "kloveniers". Doelen means "targets" in Dutch. The companies of kloveniers were armed with an early type of musket then sometimes called in Dutch "klover", from the French couleuvrine, hence the name "kloveniers". The Kloveniersdoelen was expanded in with a stylish new wing where the famous group portrait De Nachtwacht by Rembrandt was hung. In 1815 this part of the Kloveniersdoelen became used as Brack's Doelen Hotel. In 1870 a new owner took over, J.F. Hahn. During the International Colonial and Export Exhibition Hahn demolished the building in 1882-3 to make way for the current Doelen Hotel, a building of Neo-Renaissance architecture designed by architect J.F. van Hamersveld. Part of the walls and foundations were incorporated into the hotels. Some additional details of the hotel are reminders of the former Kloveniersdoelen. The gable-stone of the hotel, by J.H. Teixeira de Mattos, shows the former Swych Utrecht tower. The cupola on the Amstel side of the hotel is also a reference to the former tower. The "kloveniers" (city watchmen) is a reference to the former purpose of the site.

In 1900 the hotel was renovated and modernized. The canal tour boats of Amsterdam have their origins at the Doelen Hotel. The city's first canal tour boat, named De Tourist, departed from the hotel in 1909. On June 5 and 6, 1964, The Beatles stayed in the hotel on a stopover in Amsterdam during a European and Australian tour. The group occupied the whole first floor (US: second floor). On the second day of their visit The Beatles toured the Amsterdam canals on the boat named Jan van Galen.

In 1997 Krasnapolsky bought the hotel. The Krasnapolsky Group was bought by the Spanish chain NH Hotels in 2000 and the hotel's name was changed to the NH Doelen. In 2016, NH renovated the hotel and reopened it as the NH Collection Amsterdam Doelen.

In 2023, the hotel was rebranded into the Portuguese brand Tivoli.
