= International Colonial and Export Exhibition =

1883 colonial exhibition in Amsterdam, the Netherlands

Coordinates: 52.357°N 4.881°E

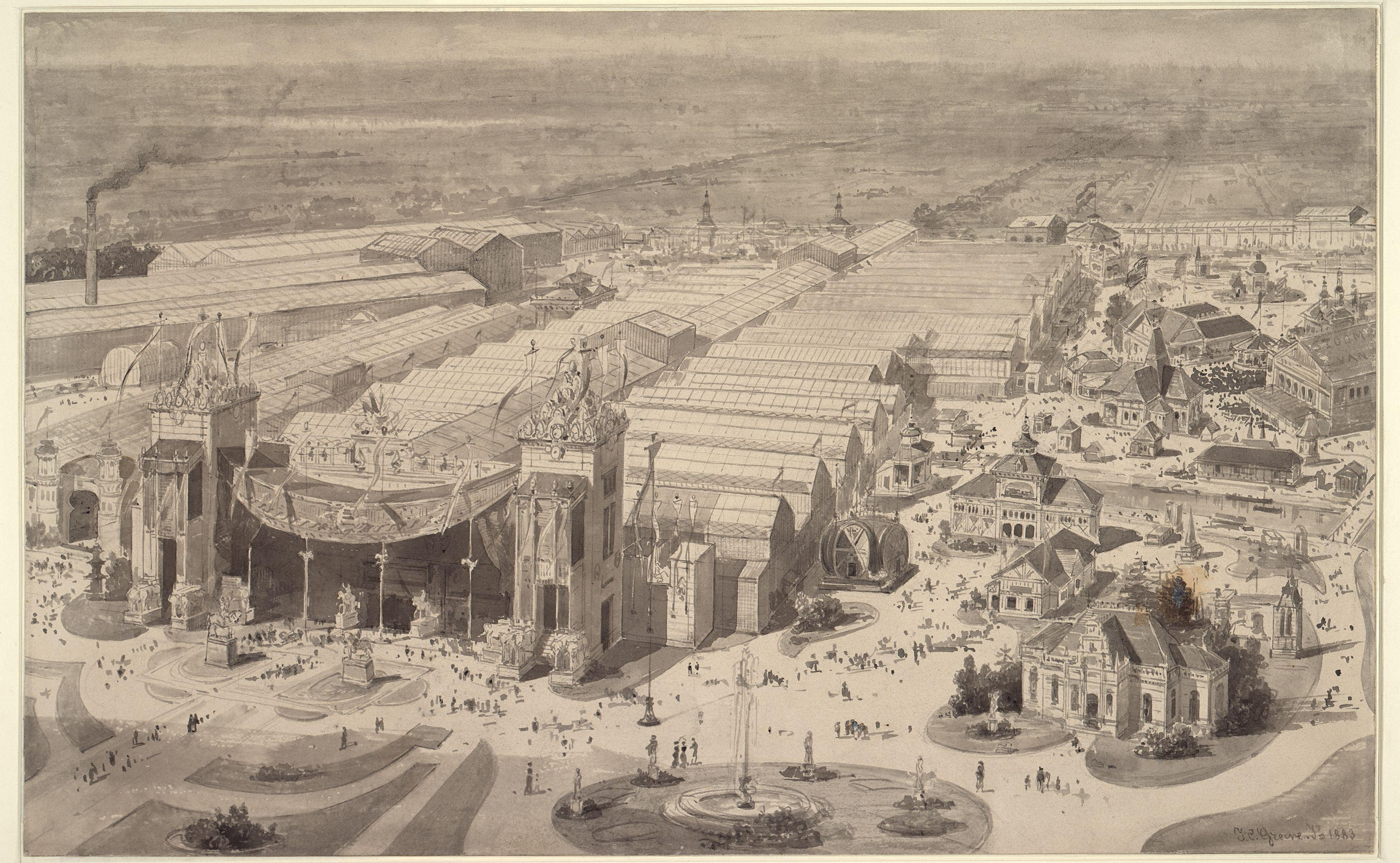
The exhibition terrain behind the Rijksmuseum, now Museumplein square

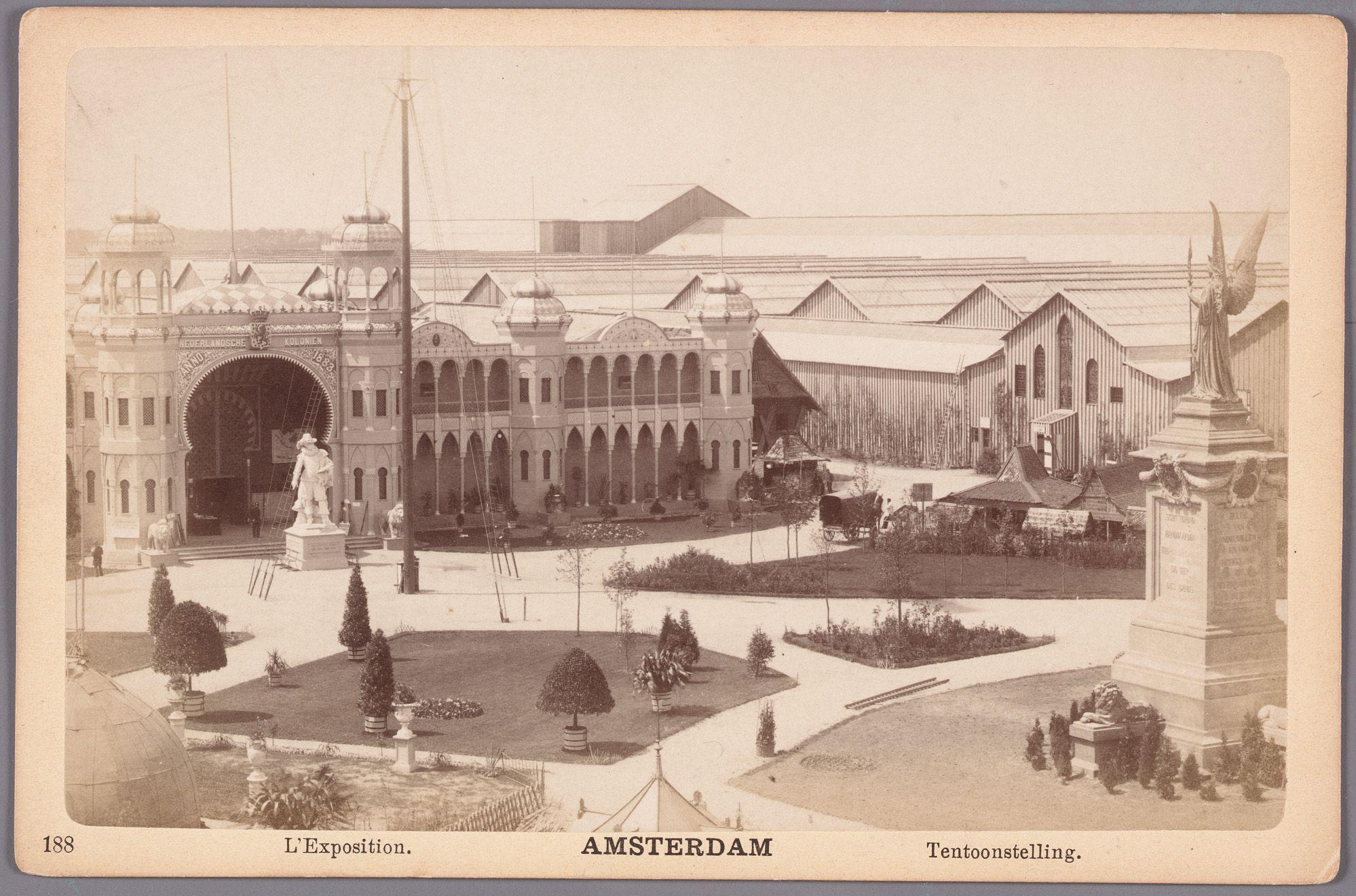
The Dutch colonial pavilion, with a statue of Jan Pieterszoon Coen

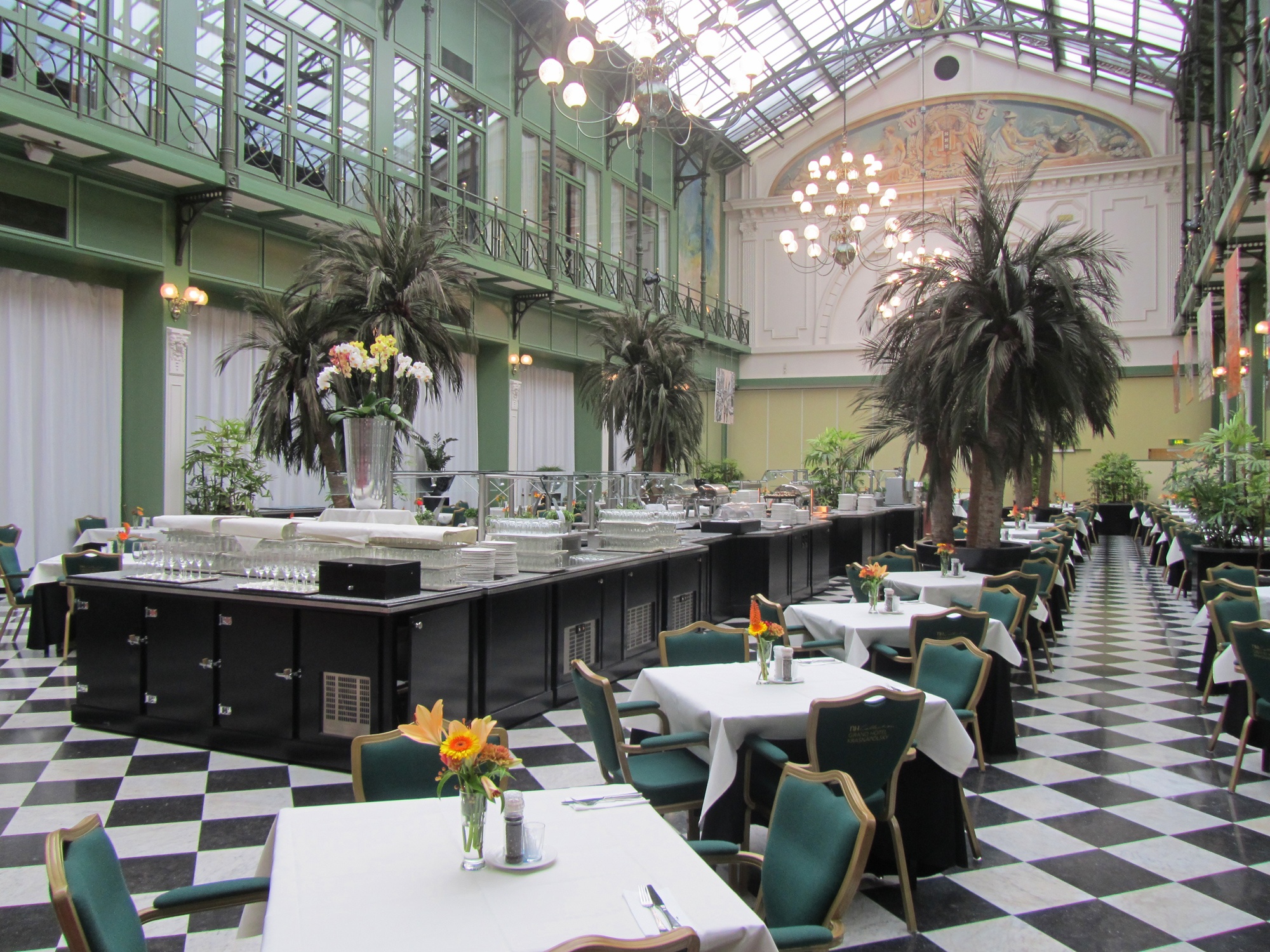
To profit from the event, Hotel Krasnapolsky was expanded with 125 rooms and the Wintertuin, shown here

The International Colonial and Export Exhibition (Dutch: Internationale Koloniale en Uitvoerhandel Tentoonstelling; French: Exposition Universelle Coloniale et d'Exportation Générale) was a colonial exhibition (a type of World's Fair) held in Amsterdam from May 1 to October 1, 1883. The event drew at least a million visitors and was the first international colonial exhibition, with 28 different nations presenting their colonial trade and wealth.

The event was the brainchild of Edouard Agostini, a French entrepreneur. Agostini, who had previously been involved in organizing the 1878 Exposition Universelle in Paris, presented his plans to the city of Amsterdam and King William III of the Netherlands in 1880. The Dutch government was initially hesitant, but Agostini managed to secure funding from Belgian and French investors.

The location chosen for the exhibition was an unused area of land behind the Rijksmuseum, which at that time was still under construction. This area is now Museumplein square. The main building was designed by the French architect Paul Fouquiau in "Moorish" style. It was constructed of wood covered with plaster and painted cloth, in order to give the impression of marble. Between the building's two large towers, a large cloth in "Indian" style was hung, with plaster heads of elephants and other animals. The building contained pavilions representing 28 different nations, including France, Germany, the United Kingdom, Belgium, Japan, the United States, China, Canada, the Ottoman Empire, Siam (Thailand), Transvaal, and the host country, the Netherlands.

Items on show in the main building included a telephone, wood- and metalworking machines, and a safe large enough to fit eight people. The building's colonial section presented products such as tobacco and rubber, as well as a reconstructed Javanese-style settlement (kampung) with "natives".

Other structures included a music pavilion; the pavilion of the city of Amsterdam; the Dutch colonial pavilion; a Japanese bazar; various shops; and Dutch, English and German restaurants. In front of the Dutch colonial pavilion was a statue of Jan Pieterszoon Coen who, as governor-general of the Dutch East Indies, played a large part in the Dutch conquest of the Indonesian archipelago. A canal with a bamboo bridge and a Chinese junk intersected the exhibition grounds.

== Effects ==
The exhibition, bringing more than a million visitors from around the world to Amsterdam, provided the city with a huge economic boost. A number of hotels were expanded or newly built in order to profit from the large number of visitors, including the Hotel Americain, the Doelen Hotel, and Hotel Krasnapolsky. The expansion of the Krasnapolsky included the glass-roofed Wintertuin lounge, with electric lighting, which at that time was considered a real novelty.

In Amsterdam, modern-day remains of the exhibition are the front gate of the Vondelpark and a collection of items in the Tropenmuseum which were on show in the Dutch colonial pavilion. Some items from the Dutch colonial pavilion were also donated to the ethnological museum of Artis zoo and, after this museum was closed, ended up in the Tropenmuseum as well. However, the lion's share of the thousands of items from this pavilion was donated to the National Museum of Ethnology in Leiden. Some parts of the German restaurant are now in the Veenkoloniaal Museum in Veendam.

Heineken still uses the label Diplôme d'Honneur on its beer bottles, an honour that was bestowed on the brewer at the 1883 colonial exhibition.

== Surinam pavilion ==
The exhibition included a Surinamese village complete with 28 inhabitants of various ethnicities - Creoles, Caraïbes, Arowaks, Marrons - who demonstrated during a period of six months how they lived and worked. The photographer Friedrich Carel Hisgen took various photographs together with the French geologist Roland Bonaparte of Surinam families and these were published in 1894 as Les Habitants de Suriname; notes receuillies à l'exposition coloniale d'Amsterdam en 1883.

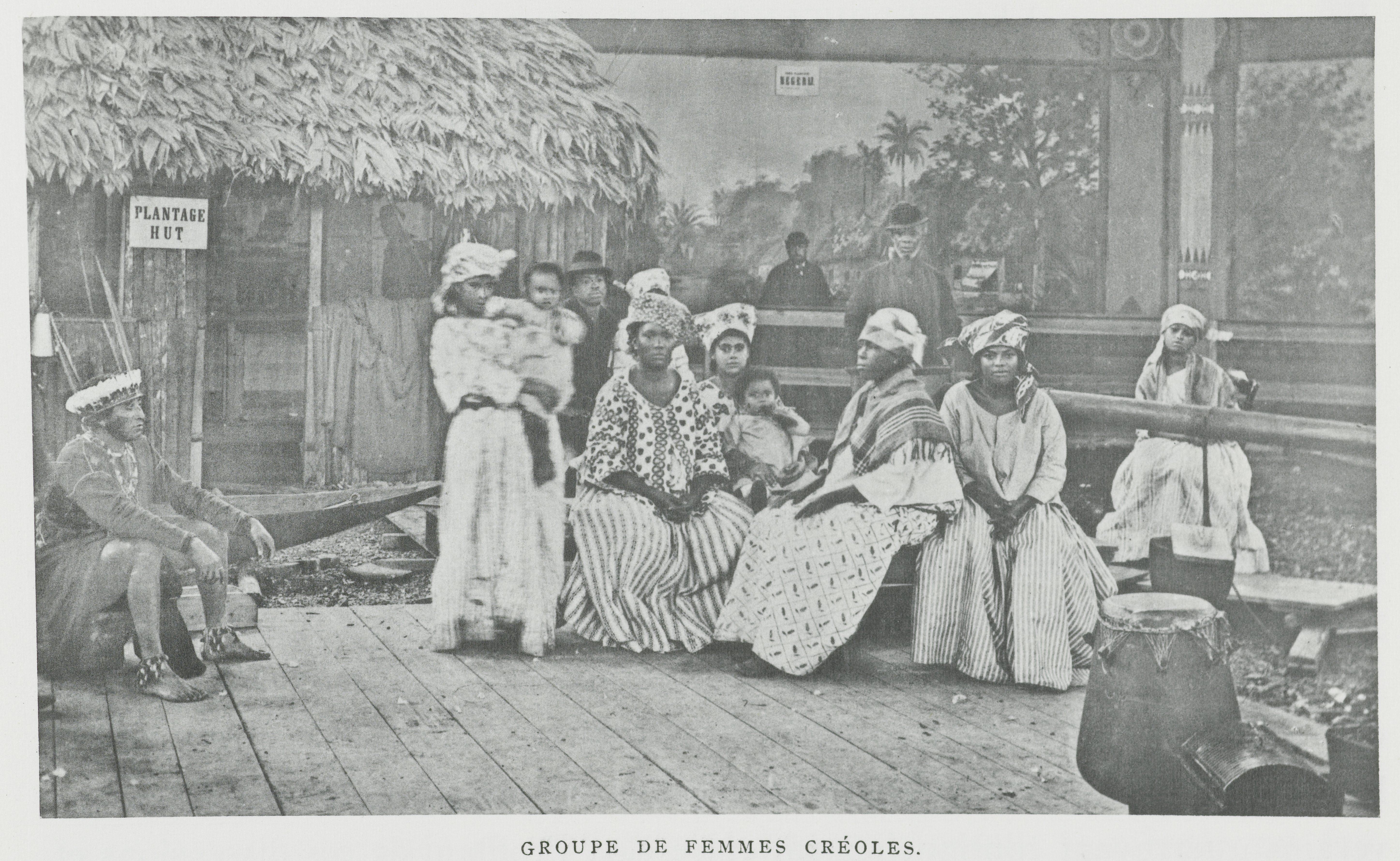
Group portrait of Creole women wearing Koto

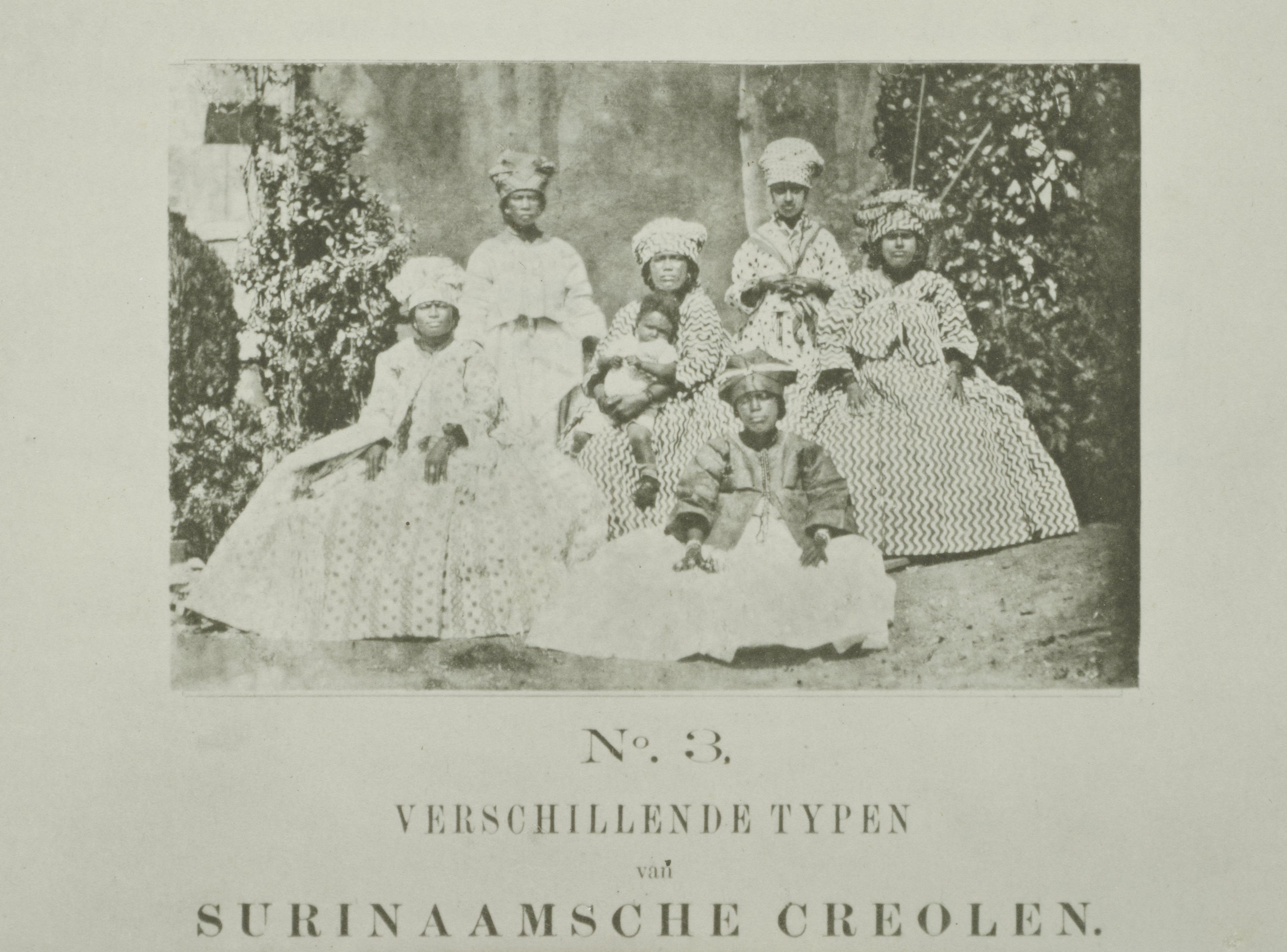
Group portrait of Creole women. The photo was used in a 2021 exhibition about slavery at the Rijksmuseum in Amsterdam

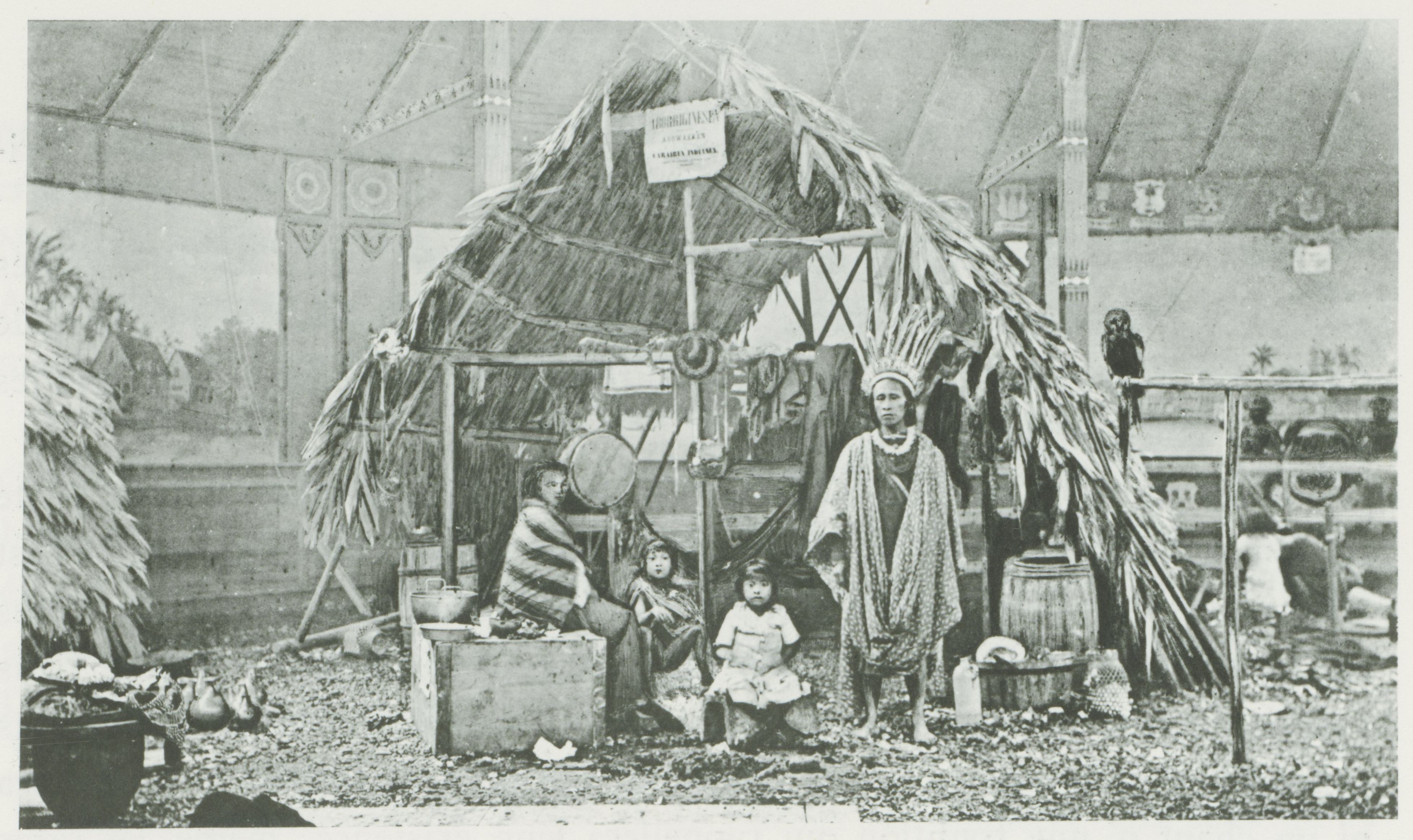
Group portrait of the family Ka-ja-Roe

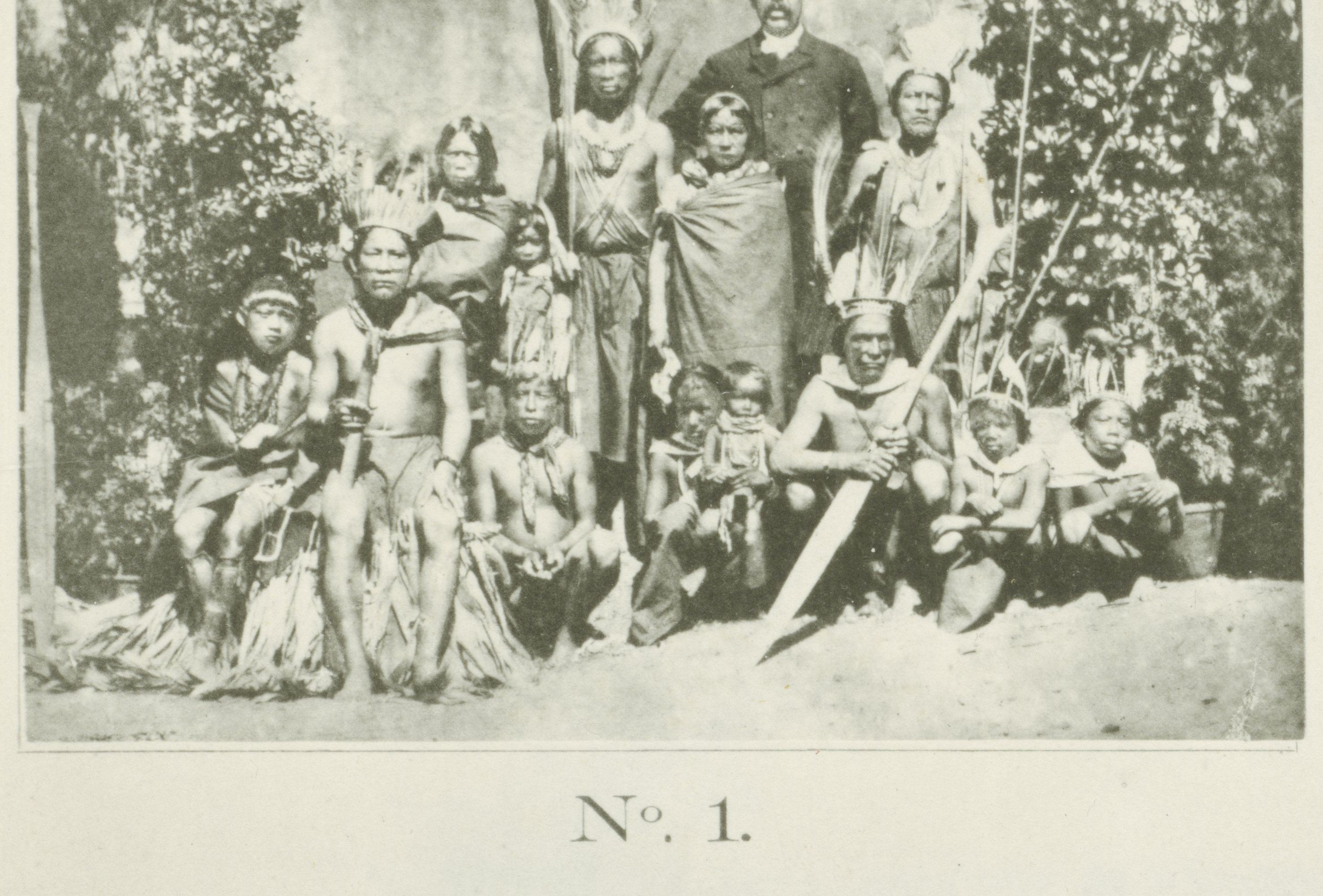
Group portrait of Surinam Arowaks and Caraïbes

== See also ==
- Colonial Exhibition of Semarang, a 1914 Colonial Exhibition in the Dutch East Indies

== Sources ==
- World Expositions in Amsterdam - 1883
- "Canon van Amsterdam". Het Parool, 14 April 2008 (Dutch)
- University of Maryland libraries: 1883 Colonial Exposition, Amsterdam
