= Concord of the State =

1642 painting by Rembrandt van Rijn

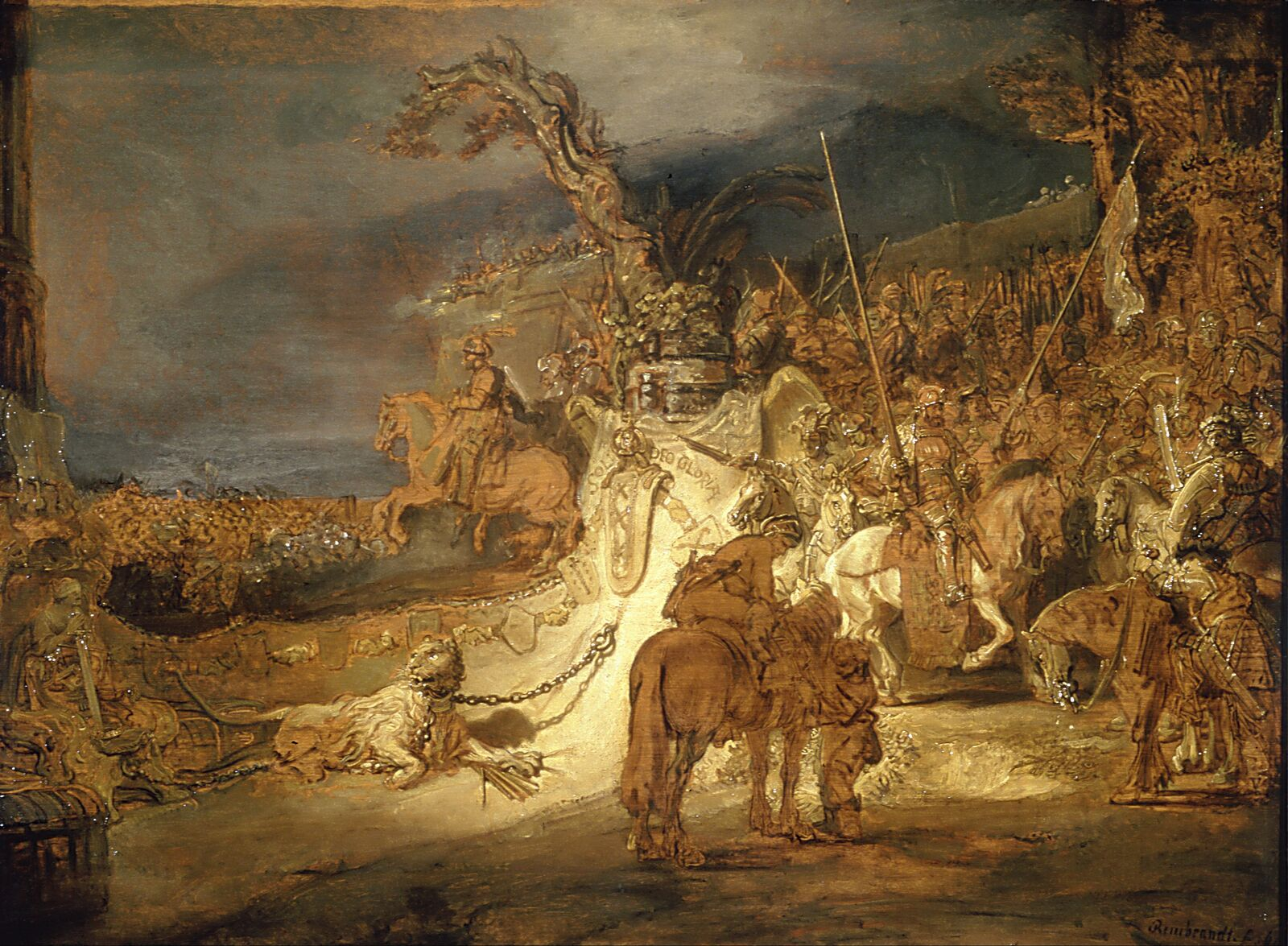

Concord of the State is a 1642 oil-on-panel painting by Rembrandt, now in the Museum Boijmans Van Beuningen in Rotterdam. It measures 74.6 cm x 101 cm and is signed and dated "REMBRANDT F. 164(.)". In terms of style and theme it is linked to The Night Watch – both paintings include symbolism and allegories of the Dutch Republic and Amsterdam.

== See also ==
- List of paintings by Rembrandt

== Bibliography ==
- (in Italian) Roberta D'Adda, Rembrandt, Milano, Skira, 2006.
