= Kloveniersdoelen, Amsterdam =

Civic guard complex in Amsterdam

Coordinates: 52°22′4″N 4°53′44″E

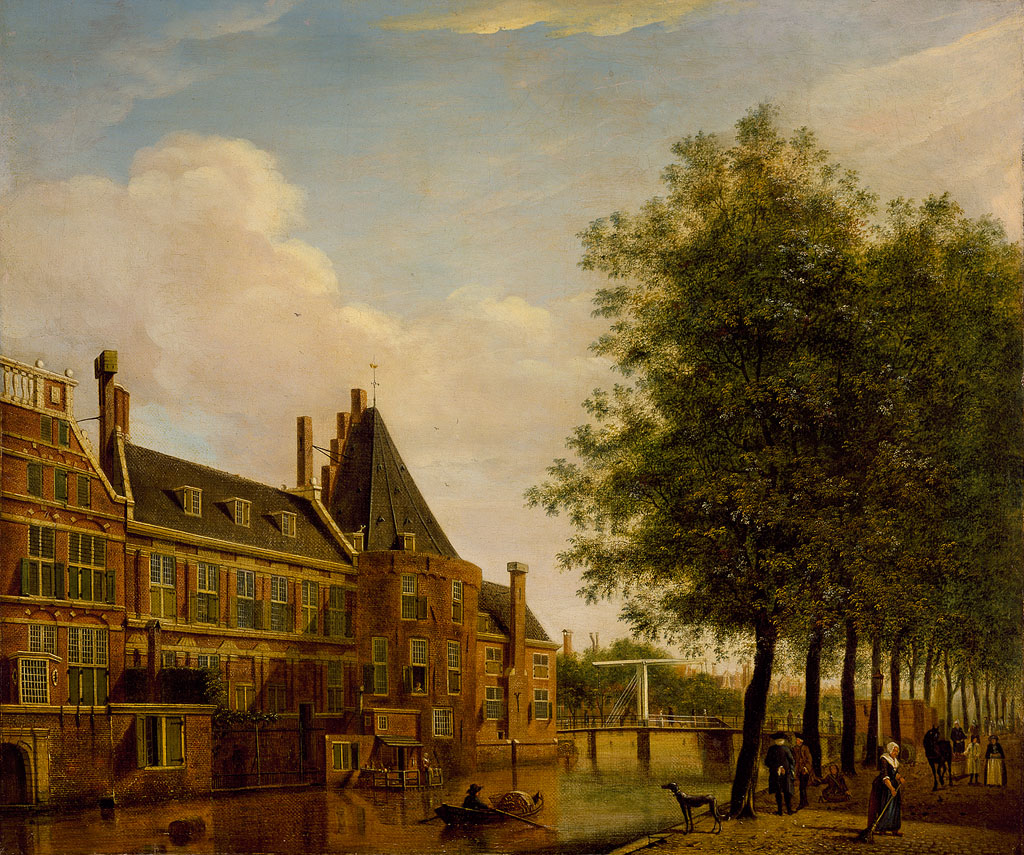
The Kloveniersdoelen in a 1775 painting by Jan Ekels the Elder. The former defensive tower Swijgh Utrecht, which formed part of the complex, is visible in the centre.

The Kloveniersdoelen ("musketeers' shooting range") was a complex of buildings in Amsterdam which served as headquarters and shooting range for the local schutterij (civic guard). The companies of kloveniers were armed with an early type of musket known as an arquebus, known in Dutch as a bus, haakbus or klover (from the French couleuvrine), hence the name kloveniers.

The Kloveniersdoelen was located at the corner of Nieuwe Doelenstraat and Kloveniersburgwal canal, both named after the former shooting range. The 19th-century Doelen Hotel now stands on the spot. Two kloveniers are depicted on the domed tower of the hotel, another reference to the history of this location.

Rembrandt's painting The Night Watch was commissioned for the great hall of the Kloveniersdoelen.

== History ==
The Kloveniersdoelen was one of three doelens (shooting ranges) for the Amsterdam schutterij (civic guard). The other two shooting ranges were the Handboogdoelen and Voetboogdoelen, both located along the Singel. The Handboogdoelen civic guard was armed with longbows, while the Voetboogdoelen civic guard wielded crossbows and the Kloveniersdoelen civic guard used an early type of musket, the arquebus. The Kloveniersdoelen was the oldest of the three.

Amsterdam's militia guilds were formed in the Middle Ages to defend the city against attack. Around 1580, at the behest of William of Orange, these Medieval guilds were incorporated into a new, much larger civic guard to defend the newly Protestant city against the Spanish during the Dutch revolt which ultimately led to a full-blown war of independence, the Eighty Years' War. Officers of this new civic guard were recruited from the well-to-do of Amsterdam.

The original building for the kloveniers guild was constructed in 1382 and stood along what is now Oude Doelenstraat, east of Dam Square. In 1520 it was replaced with a new building on Nieuwe Doelenstraat, adjacent to a defensive tower in the city walls known as Swych Utrecht ("Be quiet, Utrecht"), as its primarily role had been to defend the city against attacks by the Bishopric of Utrecht.

In 1638 a lavish new addition to the Kloveniersdoelen was completed. The new building was very modern for its time — rectangularly shaped and in the Classicist style that was very fashionable at that time. On the first floor of this new wing was a banquet hall measuring 18 by 9 meters. The elegant hall so impressed visitors that some compared it to the Banqueting House in London.

In the mid-17th century, the Eighty Years' War ended and the civic guard no longer served a military purpose. The civic guard continued to exist, but membership became an honorary position and the doelens assumed a primarily social function. The wealthiest and most powerful citizens of Dutch Golden Age Amsterdam came together in the doelens to eat, drink and smoke. The elegant building was also used for official receptions and dinners, and to provide lodgings to prominent visitors to Amsterdam. Marie de' Medici and Czar Peter the Great viewed a fireworks display on the Amstel river from a window of the Kloveniersdoelen.

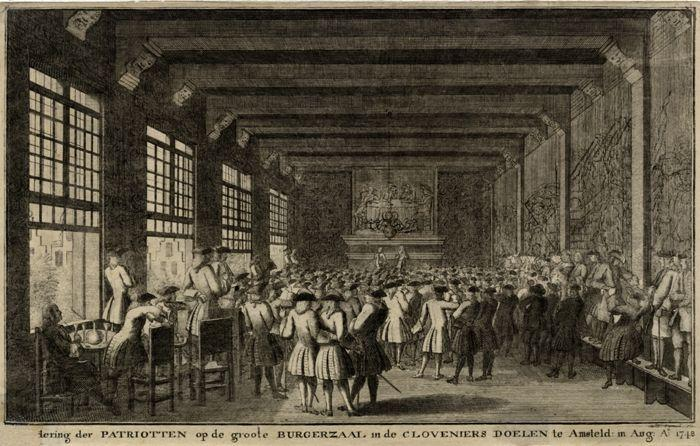
This print depicts a gathering of the Doelisten in the great hall of the Kloveniersdoelen in August 1748

From 9 August to 15 September 1748, the great hall hosted public gatherings of the Doelisten, a local protest group of mostly merchants opposing the perceived nepotism and corruption of the well-to-do who dominated Amsterdam's city government. The crowds that gathered in the hall were so large, some feared that the floor would collapse under the weight.

In 1882/1883, the entire complex was demolished and replaced by the Doelen Hotel, which still stands on this location.

== Painting ==
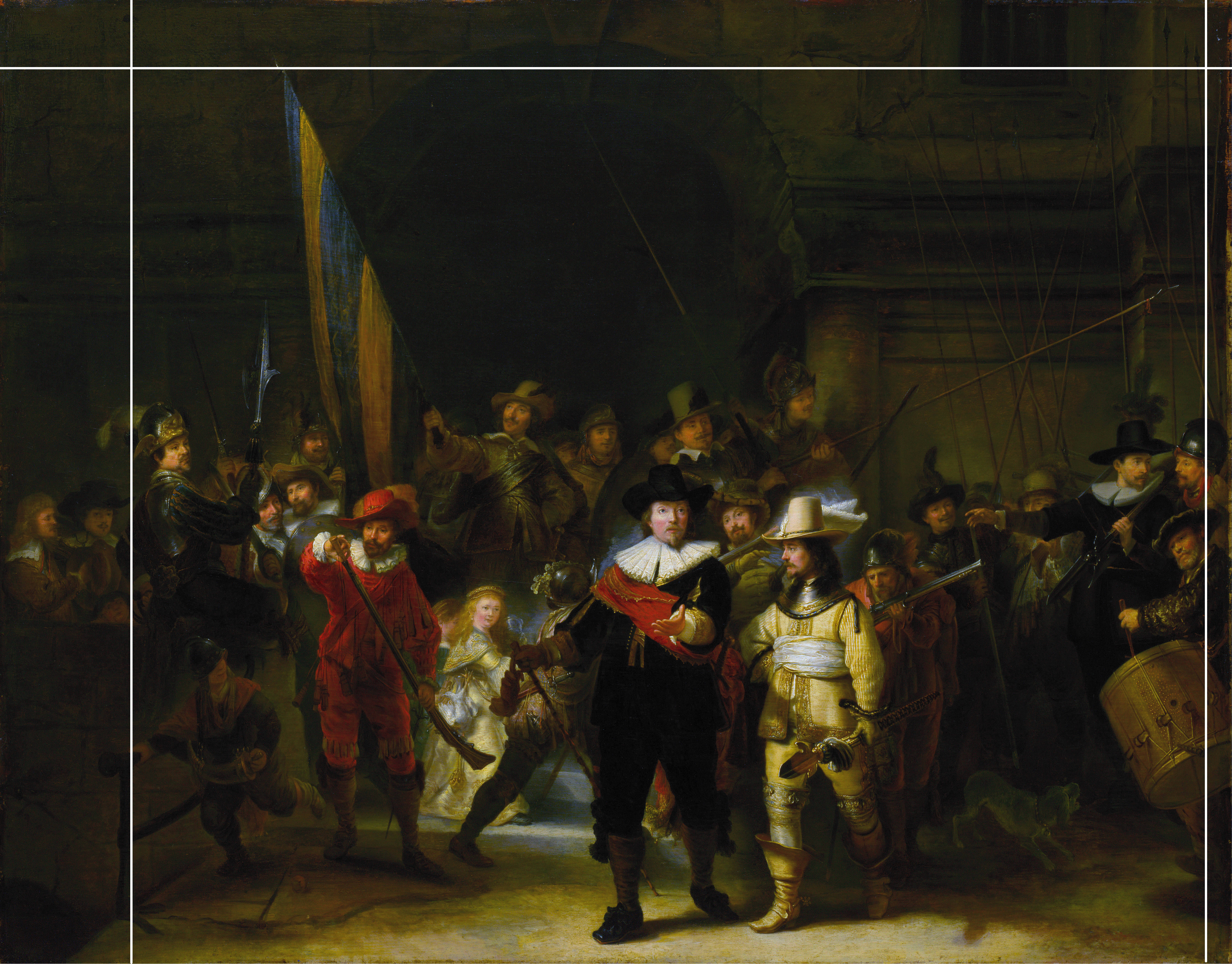
17th-century copy of The Night Watch, with lines added indicating the areas cut from Rembrandt's original painting in 1715

The walls of the Kloveniersdoelen were decorated with group portraits of the different companies of the civic guard. As early as 1529, Dirck Jacobsz painted a group portrait of a rot (company) of the kloveniers civic guard. It may have been the first group painting of the civic guard ever commissioned. The painting is now in the Rijksmuseum.

The best-known of these group portraits for the Kloveniersdoelen is Rembrandt's The Night Watch. Completed in 1642, it was commissioned by the klovenier company under the command of Frans Banning Cocq. Other painters commissioned to do group portraits for the great hall of the Kloveniersdoelen were Nicolaes Eliaszoon Pickenoy, Govert Flinck, Bartholomeus van der Helst, Jacob Adriaensz. Backer and Joachim von Sandrart.

From about 1683, the group portraits were removed from the doelens. Most were hung in Amsterdam's city hall on Dam Square (now the Royal Palace of Amsterdam), others sold at auction. Many of the paintings were significantly trimmed to fit their new home. The full-size versions are known only through copies made of the original paintings, such as the watercolor copies contained in the Egerton Manuscript, which is now in the British Library.

The Night Watch was trimmed on all four sides when it was moved to the town hall in 1715, presumably to fit the painting between two columns. This alteration resulted in the loss of two characters on the left side of the painting, as well as the top of the arch, the balustrade, and the edge of the step. This balustrade and step were key visual tools used by Rembrandt to give the painting a forward motion. A 17th-century copy of the painting by Gerrit Lundens at the National Gallery, London shows the original composition.

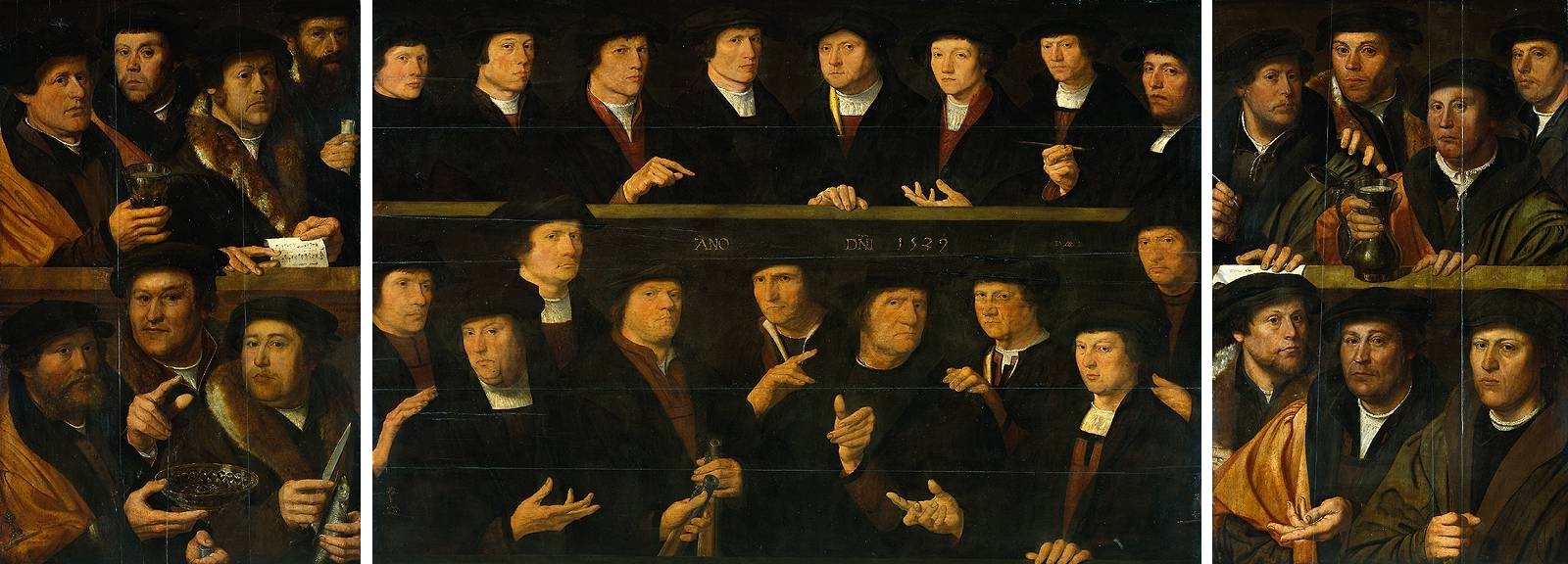
Dirk Jacobsz (1529), A Group of Guardsmen

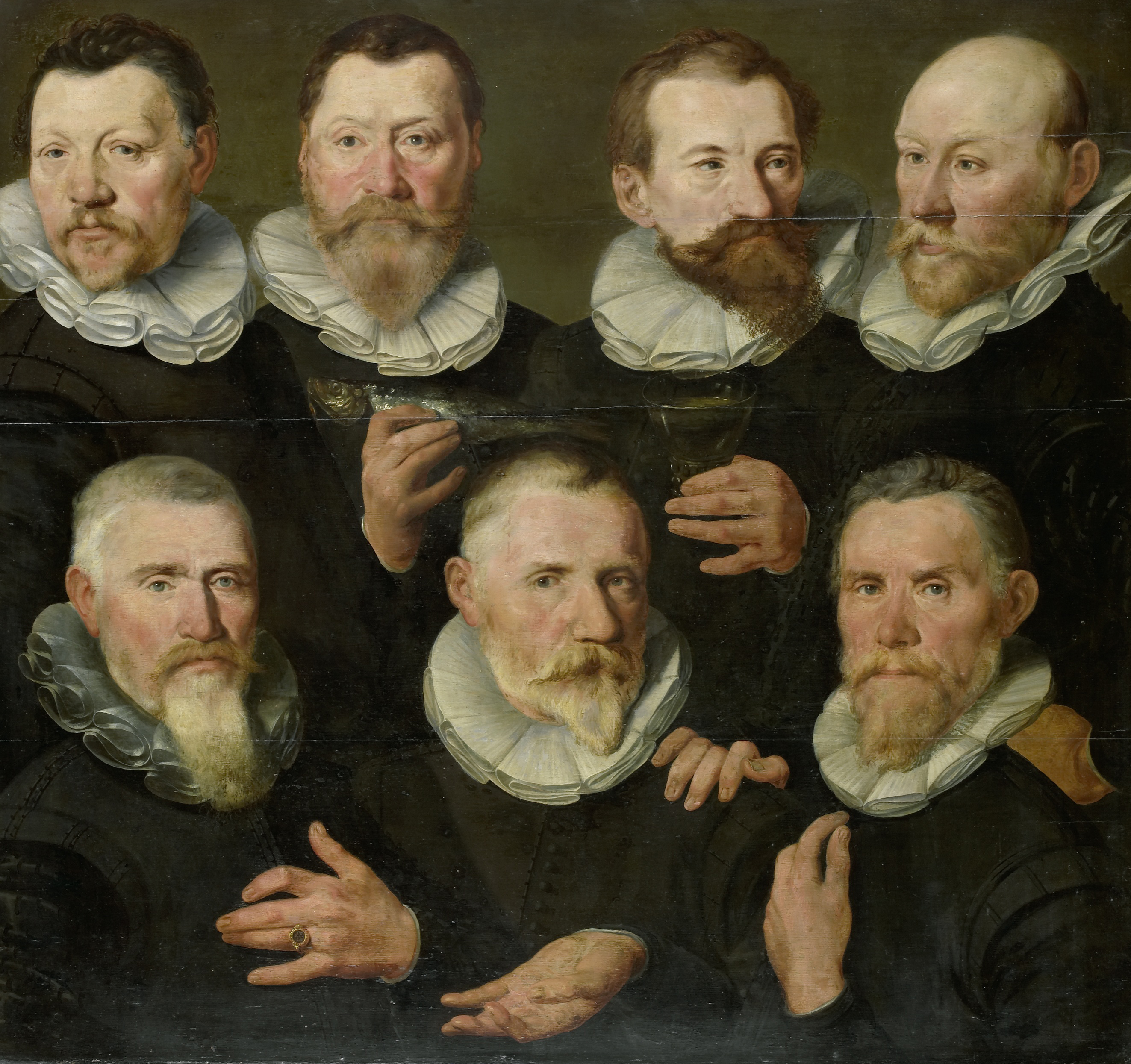
(Circle of) Pieter Pietersz the Elder (c. 1595–1605), The Company of Captain Pieter Dircksz Hasselaer and Lieutenant Jan Gerritsz Hooft

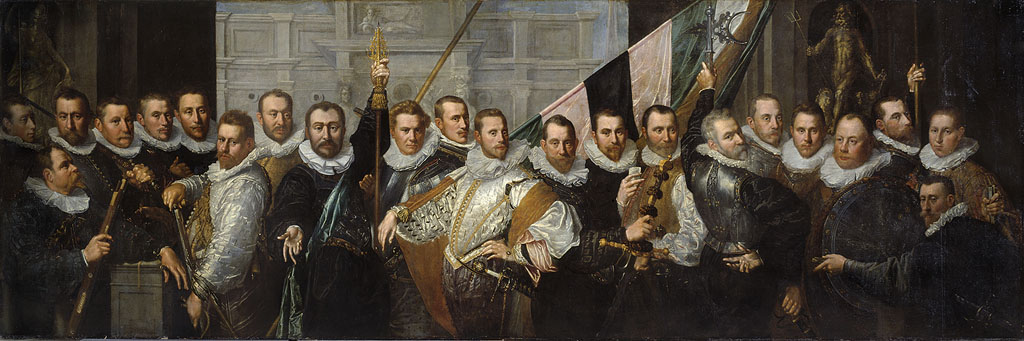
Pieter Isaacsz (1596), Civic Guardsmen from the Company of Captain Jacob Gerritsz. Hoing and Lieutenant Wybrand Appelman

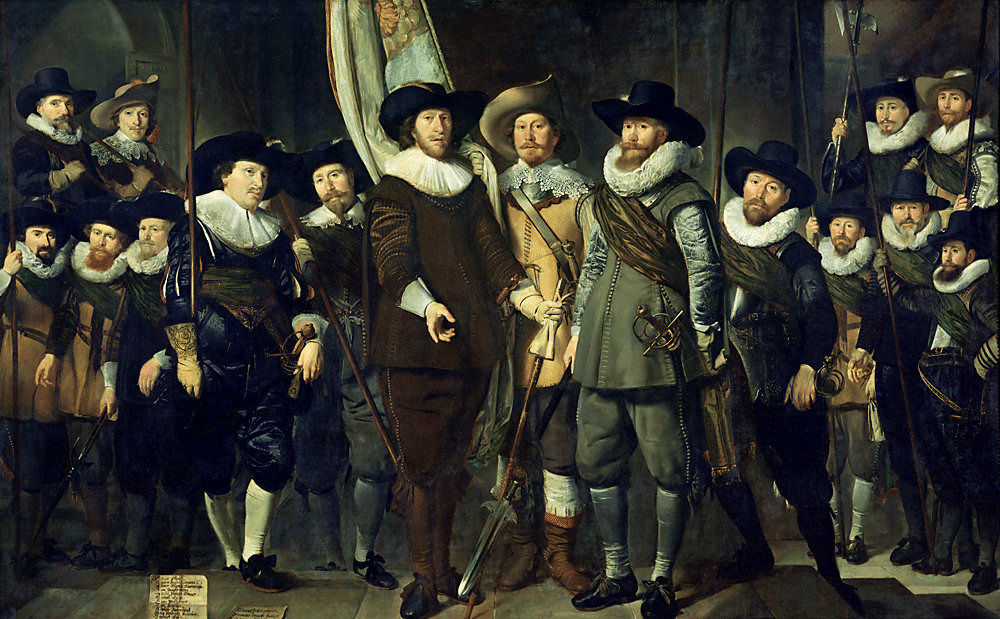
Thomas de Keyser (1632), The Company of Captain Allaert Cloeck and Lieutenant Lucas Jacobsz. Rotgans

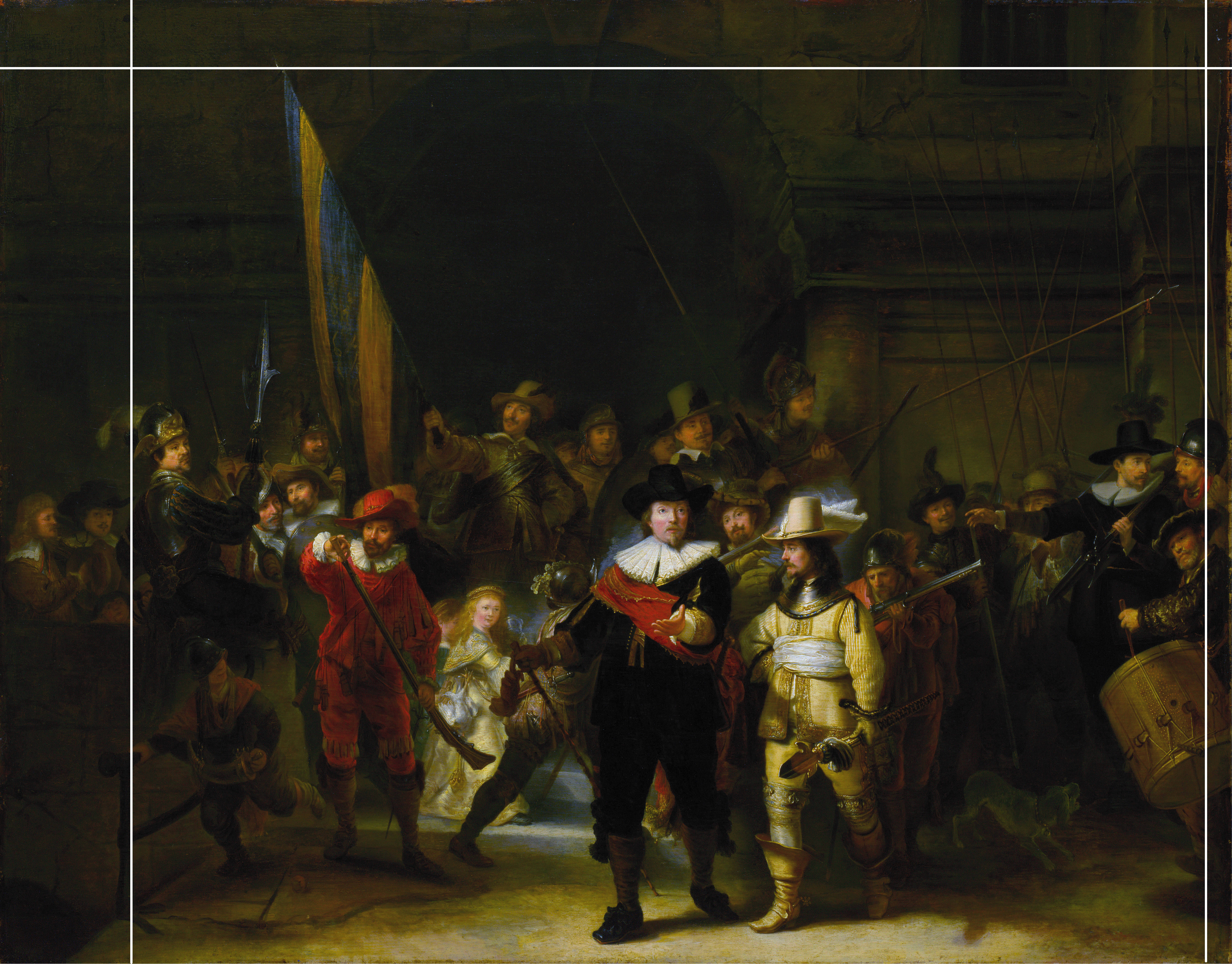
Rembrandt (1642), The Company of Frans Banning Cocq and Willem van Ruytenburgh, better known as The Night Watch

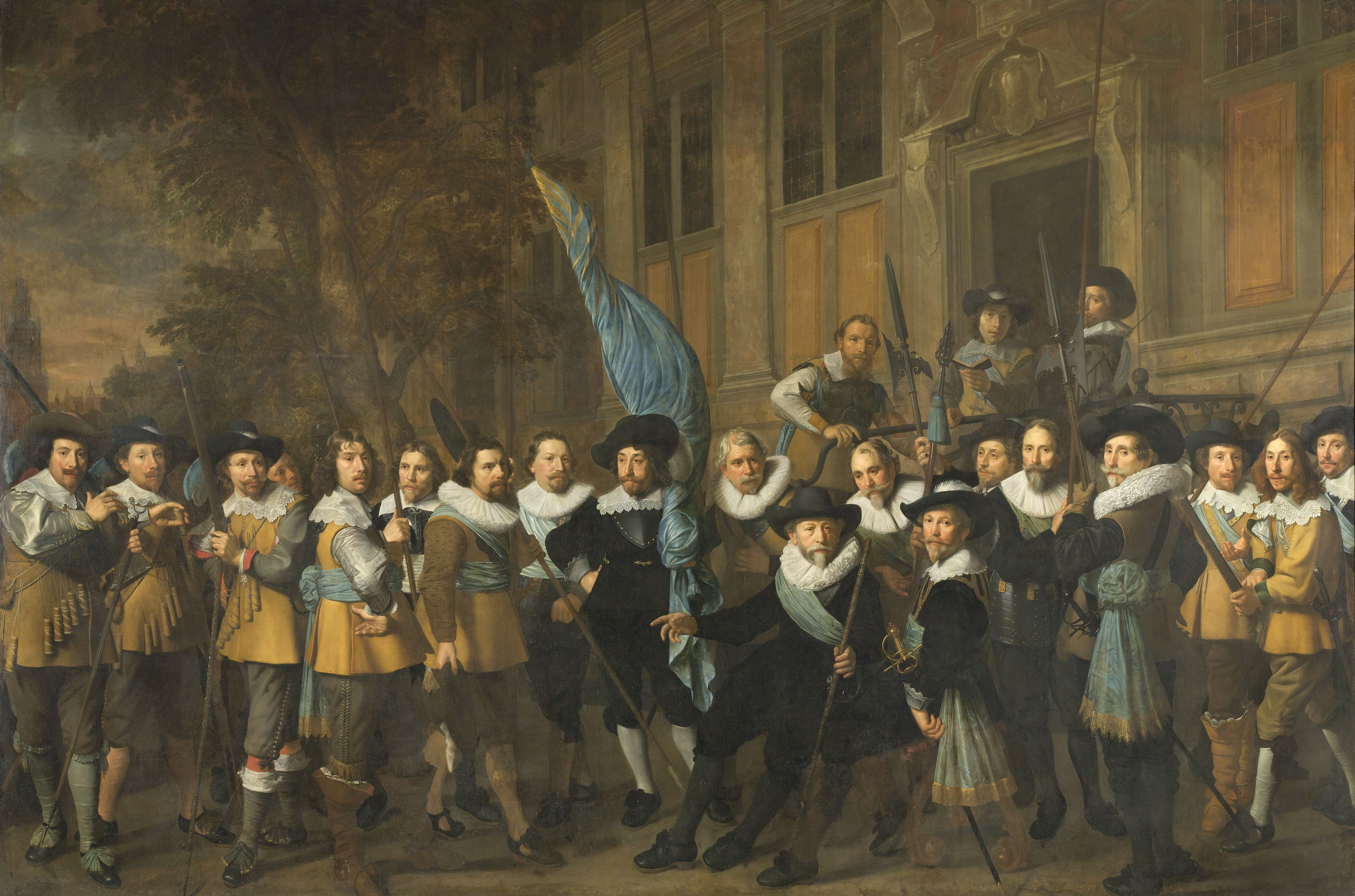
Nicolaes Eliasz. Pickenoy (1642), Officers and other Civic Guardsmen of the IV District of Amsterdam, under the Command of Captain Jan Claesz van Vlooswijck and Lieutenant Gerrit Hudde

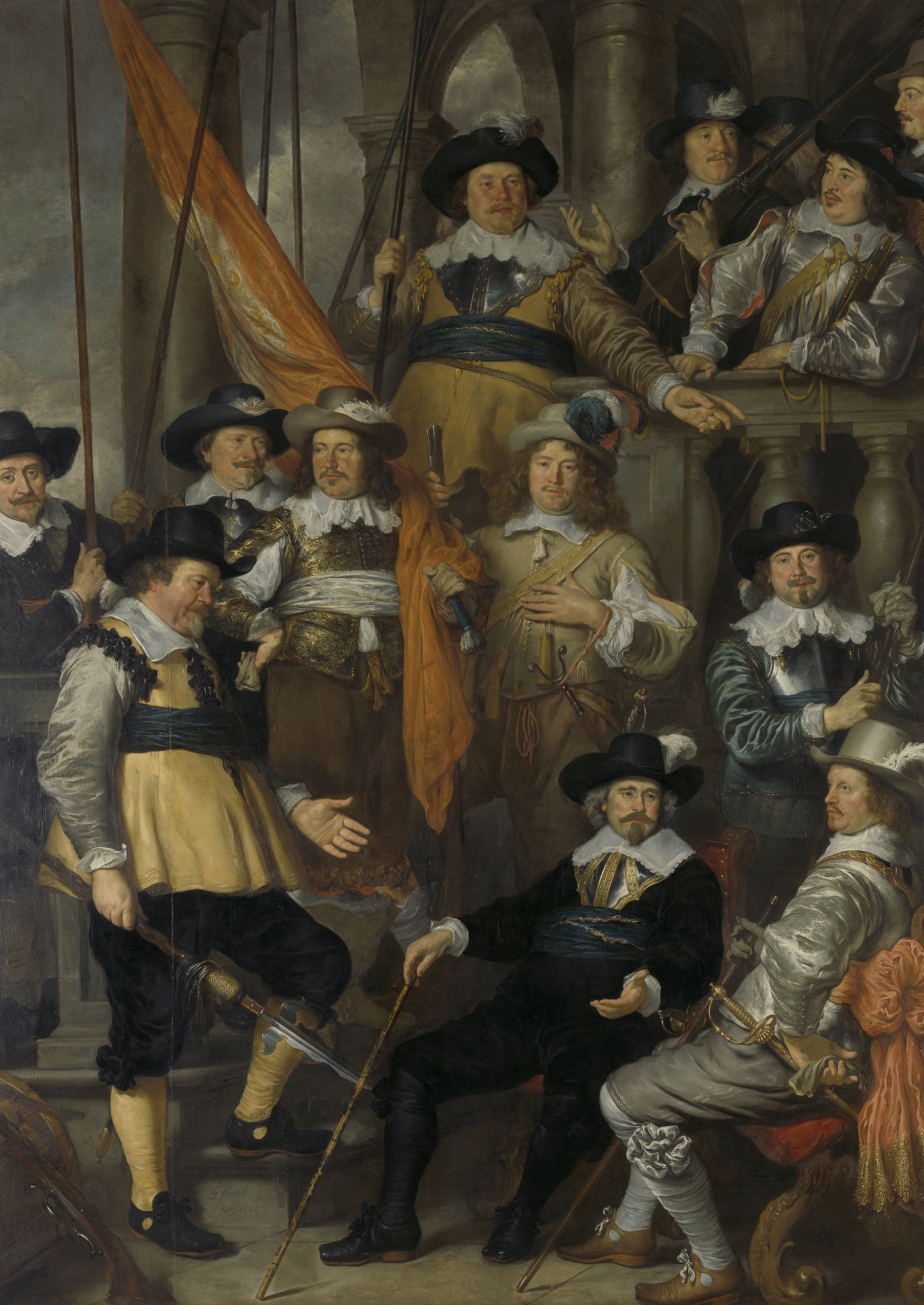
Govert Flinck (1645), The Company of Captain Albert Bas and Lieutenant Lucas Conyn

== Related buildings ==
The Kloveniersdoelen was one of three doelens (shooting ranges) for the Amsterdam civic guard, alongside the Handboogdoelen and Voetboogdoelen, both located along Singel canal. Of the three, only the Handboogdoelen survives.

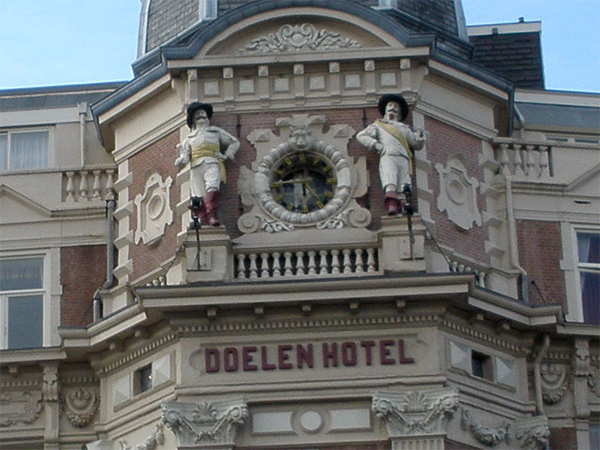
The tower of the Doelen Hotel recalls the former Kloveniersdoelen. The two kloveniers depicted originally held muskets.

The location of the Kloveniersdoelen is now occupied by the 19th-century Doelen Hotel. The Neo-Renaissance building contains some of the original walls and foundations of the Kloveniersdoelen. Two kloveniers are depicted on the domed tower of the hotel. They originally held muskets but these have gone missing.

Other Dutch towns, including Middelburg, Haarlem and Dordrecht, also had a Kloveniersdoelen.
