= Kloveniersburgwal, Amsterdam =

Canal in Amsterdam

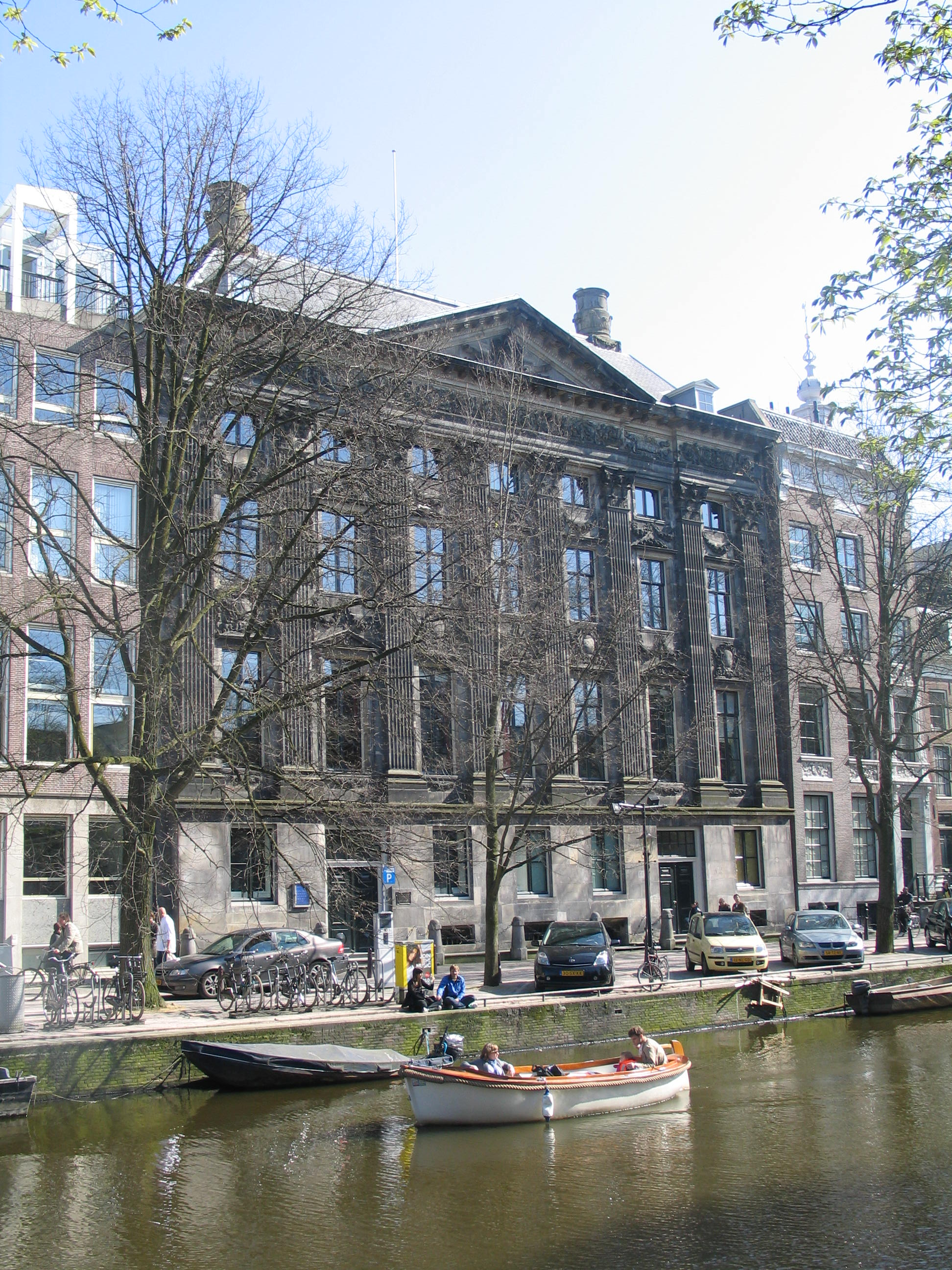
The Trippenhuis

Kloveniersburgwal is an Amsterdam canal flowing south from Nieuwmarkt to the Amstel River on the edge of the medieval city, lying east of the dam in the centre of Amsterdam.

== History ==
The Kloveniersburgwal was dug at the end of the 15th century. The Geldersekade, the Singel and the Kloveniersburgwal together formed the city wall around the city.

After the Nieuwe Gracht (Oude Schans now) was dug and the new city walls were built, Kloveniersburgwal lost its function as a defense canal. The old city wall was taken down and houses were built on it instead. The east side became populated in the 17th century and has a few grand mansions, like the Trippenhuis, now housing the KNAW.

The name 'Kloveniersburgwal' comes from a division of the civic guards, the 'kloveniers', named after the gun the guards were armed with. The kloveniers met at the 'Kloveniersdoelen' next to Swijgh Utrecht on the corner of the Kloveniersburgwal and the Nieuwe Doelenstraat. Later on their groupportrait, the famous painting De Nachtwacht (by Rembrandt), hung in the 'Kloveniersdoelen'. Nowadays, it is exhibited in the Rijksmuseum. Swijgh Utrecht was completely destroyed in 1882; the Doelenhotel was built there instead.

During the Second World War, starting in February 1941, Kloveniersburgwal was the border of the Jewish quarter, segregated by the Germans. In the "Jodenhoek" between Centraal Station, Kloveniersburgwal, Waterlooplein, Valkenburgerstraat, and Prins Hendrikkade, there lived more than 25,000 Jews.

Kloveniersburgwal was popular with administrators at the Dutch East India Company, being close to its center on Oude Hoogstraat and its warehouse.

== Monuments ==
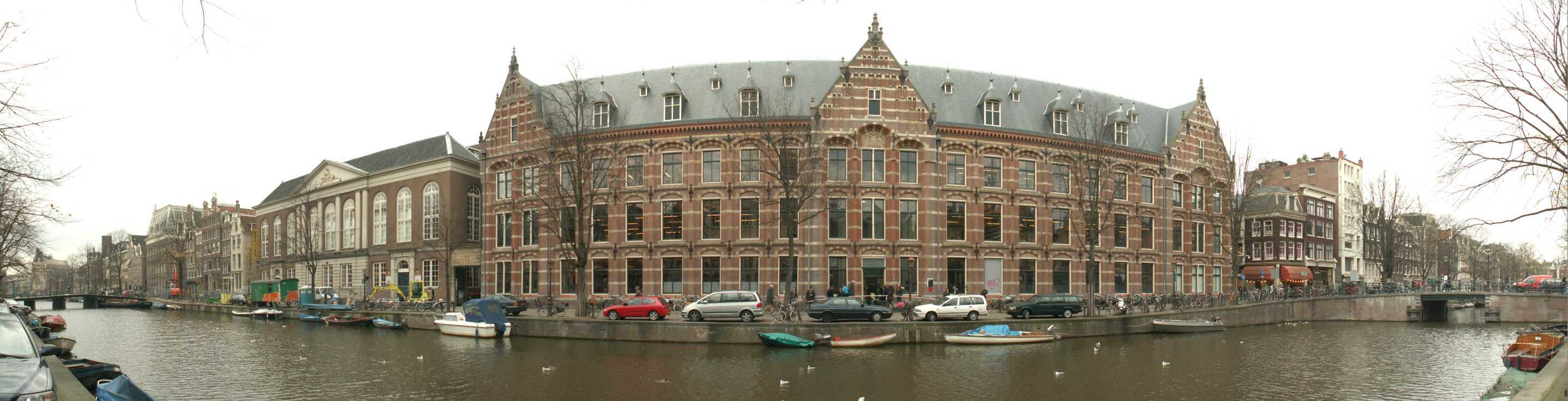
Kloveniersburgwal, westside.

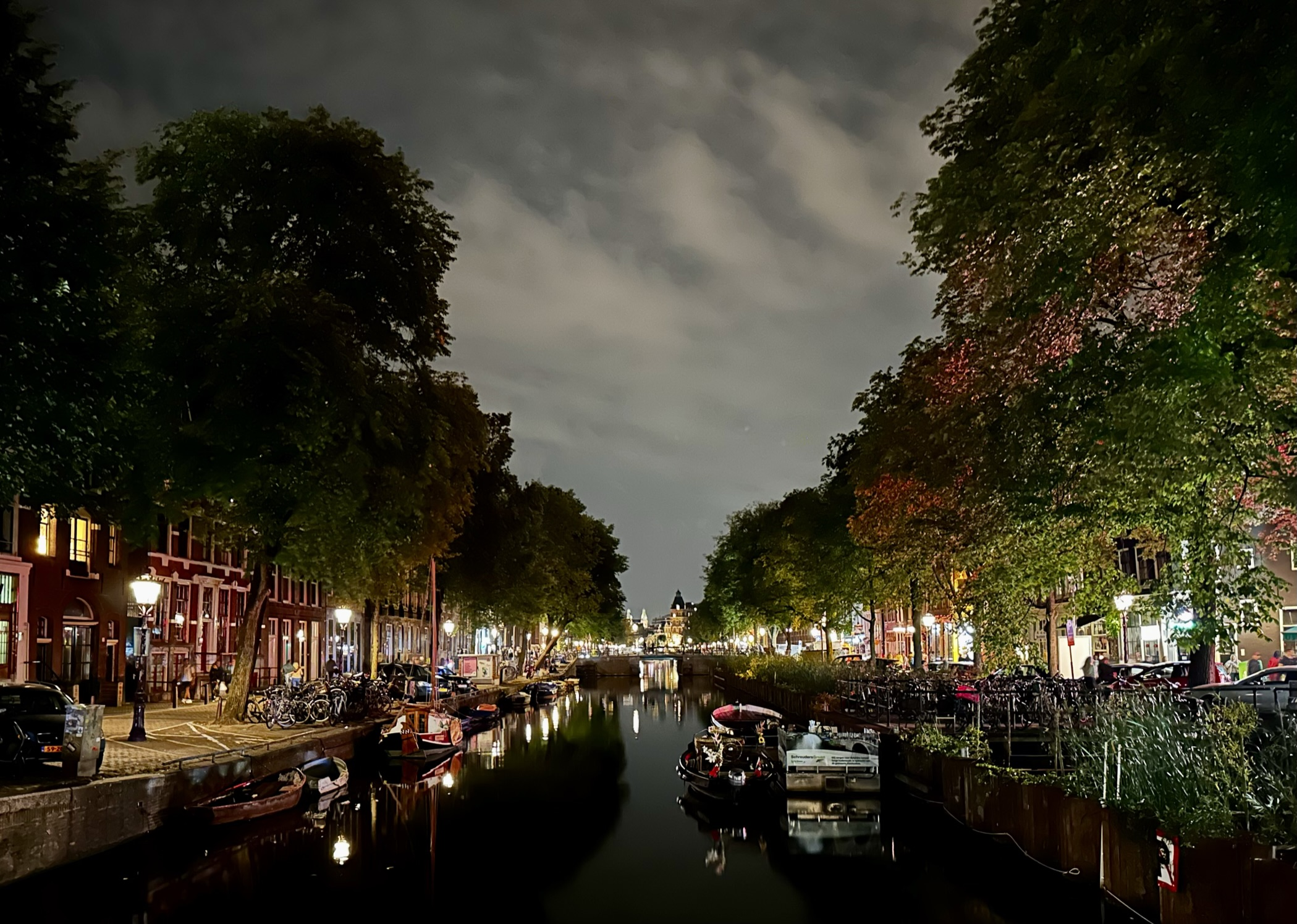
Kloveniersburgwal at night

There are some historically important monuments located at Kloveniersburgwal, for example:

- 'The Trippenhuis' (1662), KLoveniersburgwal 29;
- The former church from the 'Evangelisch-Lutherse Gemeente ', Kloveniersburwal 50;
- 'The Bushuis' (1890) between 'The Compagnietheater' and Oude Hoogstraat;
- 'The Huis Joan Poppen' (1642), which is also called 'The Gulden Steur', Kloveniersburgwal 95;
- A part of the former Binnengasthuis;
- The entrance of Oudemanhuispoort.

== Theatres ==
- Compagnietheater, Kloveniersburgwal 50;
- Literair theater Perdu, Kloveniersburgwal 86;
- Doelenzaal, Kloveniersburgwal 87-89.
