= Veenkoloniaal Museum =

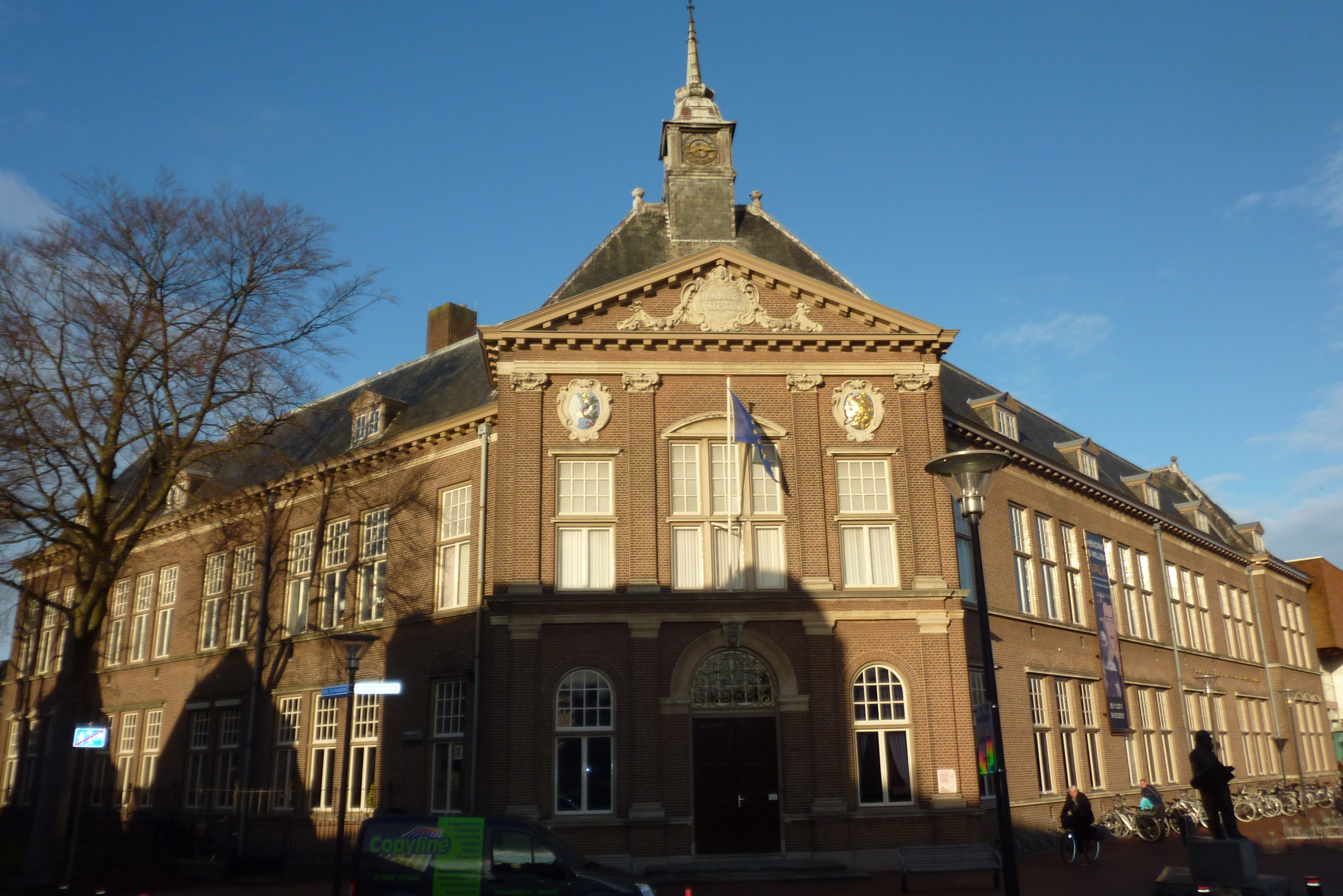
- Museum entrance in 2011

- Location in Groningen, Netherlands
- Established: 15 December 1939
- Location: Museumplein 5 Veendam, Netherlands
- Coordinates: 53°6′25″N 6°52′33″E
- Type: Regional museum History museum
- Visitors: 24,674 (2017)
- Director: Hendrik Hachmer
- Public transit access: Hertenkampstraat; Bus line 174
- Website: veenkoloniaalmuseum.nl

Veenkoloniaal Museum (Dutch pronunciation: [ˈveːŋkoːloːniˌjaːl myˈzeːjʏm]; English: "Peat-Colonial Museum") is a regional museum in the village of Veendam in the Netherlands. The museum shows not only the history of the peat district in Groningen. Situated in a monumental building dating from 1911 the Veenkoloniaal Museum exhibits the development of the Groninger Peat district but also the history of hundreds of inland barges and a similar number of skippers families. For the Groningen peatdistrict the 19th century is a golden age. Agriculture, shipping and potato starch and strawboard industries flourish. Hundreds of captains sail from Veendam, Wildervank, Oude Pekela, Nieuwe Pekela to Portugal, Great Britain and the Baltic Sea. Strawboard is exported to England, which explains the name Albion of one of the factories. Amazing when you consider that these enterprising villages are situated more than forty kilometres from the coast. In 2008–2019, the museum had between 20,000 and 29,000 visitors annually.

== Location ==
The Veenkoloniaal Museum is located at the Museumplein 5 in the village of Veendam in the province of Groningen in the northeast of the Netherlands.

== History ==
The museum was founded on 15 December 1939.

Since 1989, the museum is housed in a former school building in the center of Veendam.

== Administration ==
Year	Visitors	Year	Visitors
2003	17,500	2010	27,003
2004	20,885	2011	22,567
2005	19,069	2012	23,771
2006	18,271	2013	20,676
2007	21,618	2014	20,543
2008	28,558	2015	23,581
2009	27,321	2016	25,000 (est.)
		2017	24,674

Hendrik Andries Hachmer is director of the museum.

In the years 2003 to 2019, the museum had between 17,500 and 28,600 visitors per year, with more than 25,000 visitors in 2016.

The museum is a member of the regional Museumhuis Groningen (Groningen Museum House) and the national Museumvereniging (Museum Association).
