= The Night Watch =

1642 painting by Rembrandt

- De Nachtwacht (Dutch)
- Artist: Rembrandt van Rijn
- Year: 1642
- Medium: Oil on canvas
- Movement: Baroque, Dutch Golden Age
- Subject: Schutterij
- Dimensions: 363 cm × 437 cm (142.9 in × 172.0 in)
- Location: Amsterdam Museum on permanent loan to Rijksmuseum in Amsterdam, Netherlands
- Website: The Rijksmuseum

Militia Company of District II under the Command of Captain Frans Banninck Cocq, also known as The Shooting Company of Frans Banning Cocq and Willem van Ruytenburch, but commonly referred to as The Night Watch (Dutch: De Nachtwacht), is a 1642 painting by Rembrandt van Rijn. It is in the collection of the Amsterdam Museum but is prominently displayed in the Rijksmuseum as the best-known painting in its collection. The Night Watch is one of the most famous Dutch Golden Age paintings. Rembrandt's large painting of 363 by 437 centimetres (12 by 14 1/2 feet) is famed for transforming a group portrait of a civic militia guards (Dutch: schutterij or kloveniers) company into a compelling drama energised by light and shadow (tenebrism). The title is a misnomer; the painting does not depict a nocturnal scene.

The Night Watch was completed in 1642 at the peak of the Dutch Golden Age. It depicts the militia company moving out, led by Captain Frans Banninck Cocq (dressed in black, with a red sash) and his lieutenant, Willem van Ruytenburch (dressed in yellow, with a white sash). Behind them, the company's colours are carried by the ensign, Jan Visscher Cornelissen. Rembrandt incorporated the traditional emblem of the arquebusiers in the figure of the young girl who carries a dead chicken on her belt, referencing the clauweniers (arquebusiers) and a type of drinking horn used at group banquets.

== History ==
=== Commission ===
The painting was commissioned around 1639 by Frans Banninck Cocq and seventeen members of his civic militia guards (Dutch: schutterij or kloveniers). Eighteen names appear on a shield, painted circa 1715, in the centre-right background, as the hired drummer was added to the painting for free. A total of 34 characters appear in the painting. Rembrandt was paid 1,600 guilders for the painting (each person paid one hundred), a large sum at the time. This was one of a series of seven similar paintings of the militiamen (Dutch: schuttersstuk) commissioned during that time from various artists.

The painting was commissioned to hang in the banquet hall of the newly built Kloveniersdoelen (Musketeers' Meeting Hall) in Amsterdam. Some have suggested that the occasion for Rembrandt's commission and the series of other commissions given to other artists was the visit of the French queen, Marie de' Medici, in 1638. Even though she was escaping from her exile from France ordered by her son Louis XIII, the Queen's arrival was met with great pageantry.

It is thought the painting was completed in a lean-to in Rembrandt's garden as it is too large to fit into his Amsterdam studio.

=== Location ===
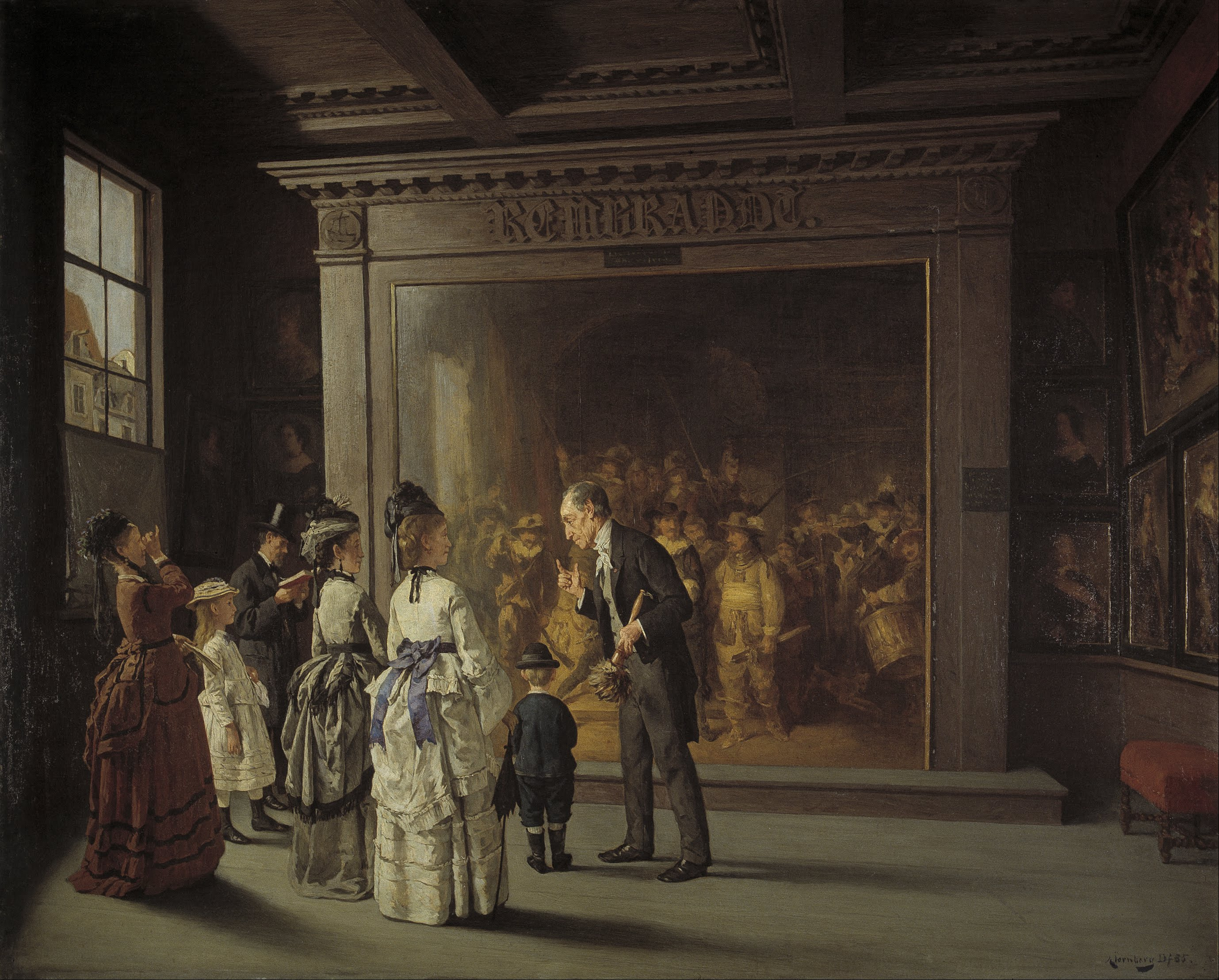
The Night Watch as it hung in the Trippenhuis in 1885, by August Jernberg

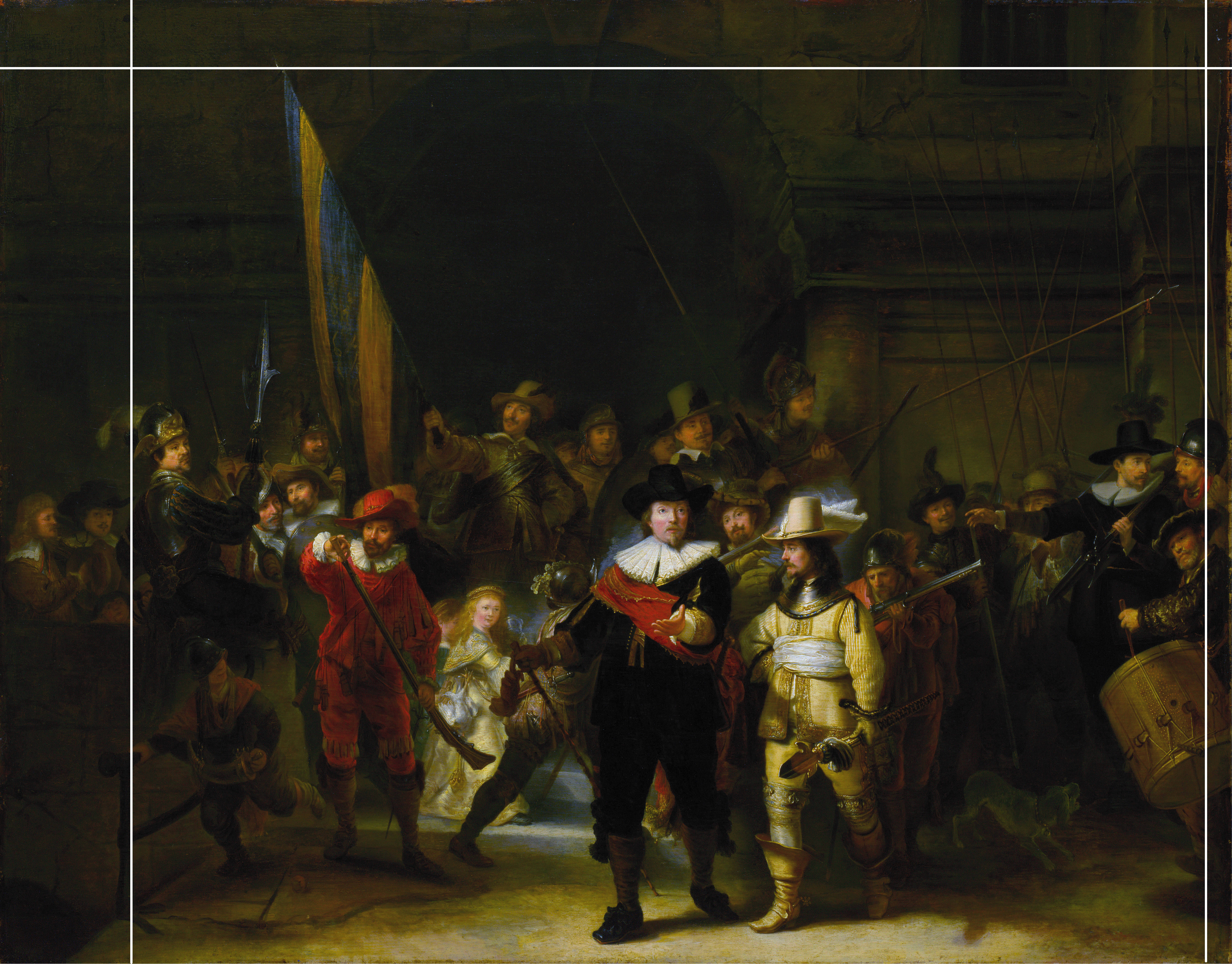
17th-century copy by Gerrit Lundens with lines added indicating the areas cut down from the original painting in 1715

The Night Watch first hung in the Groote Zaal (Great Hall) of Amsterdam's Kloveniersdoelen. This structure currently houses the Doelen Hotel. In 1715, the painting was moved to the Amsterdam Town Hall, for which it was trimmed on all four sides. This was done, presumably, to fit the painting between two columns and was a common practice before the 19th century. This alteration resulted in the loss of two characters on the left side of the painting, the top of the arch, the balustrade, and the edge of the step. The missing portions have not been found; Taco Dibbits, director of the Rijksmuseum, has some hope that possibly at least the left-hand side might not have been destroyed as it contained three figures, and at the time the painting was trimmed Rembrandt paintings were already expensive.

A 17th-century copy of the painting by Gerrit Lundens (1622–1683), on loan from the National Gallery, London, to the Rijksmuseum, shows the original composition.

When Napoleon occupied the Netherlands, the Town Hall became the Palace on the Dam and the magistrates moved the painting to the Trippenhuis of the family Trip. Napoleon ordered it returned, but after the occupation ended in 1813, the painting again moved to the Trippenhuis, which now housed the Dutch Academy of Sciences. It remained there until it moved to the new Rijksmuseum when its building was finished in 1885.

The painting was removed from the Rijksmuseum in September 1939, at the onset of World War II. The canvas was detached from its frame and rolled around a cylinder. The rolled painting was stored for four years in a special safe that was built to protect many works of art in the caves of Maastricht. After the end of the war, the canvas was re-mounted, restored, and returned to the Rijksmuseum.

On 11 December 2003, The Night Watch was moved to a temporary location, due to a major refurbishment of the Rijksmuseum. The painting was detached from its frame, wrapped in stain-free paper, put into a wooden frame which was put into two sleeves, driven on a cart to its new destination, hoisted, and brought into its new home through a special slit.

While the refurbishment took place, The Night Watch could be viewed in its temporary location in the Philipsvleugel of the Rijksmuseum. When the refurbishment was finished in April 2013, the painting was returned to its original place in the Nachtwachtzaal (Room of the Night Watch).

=== Vandalism and restoration ===
Dutch-language Newsreel of the restoration in 1975

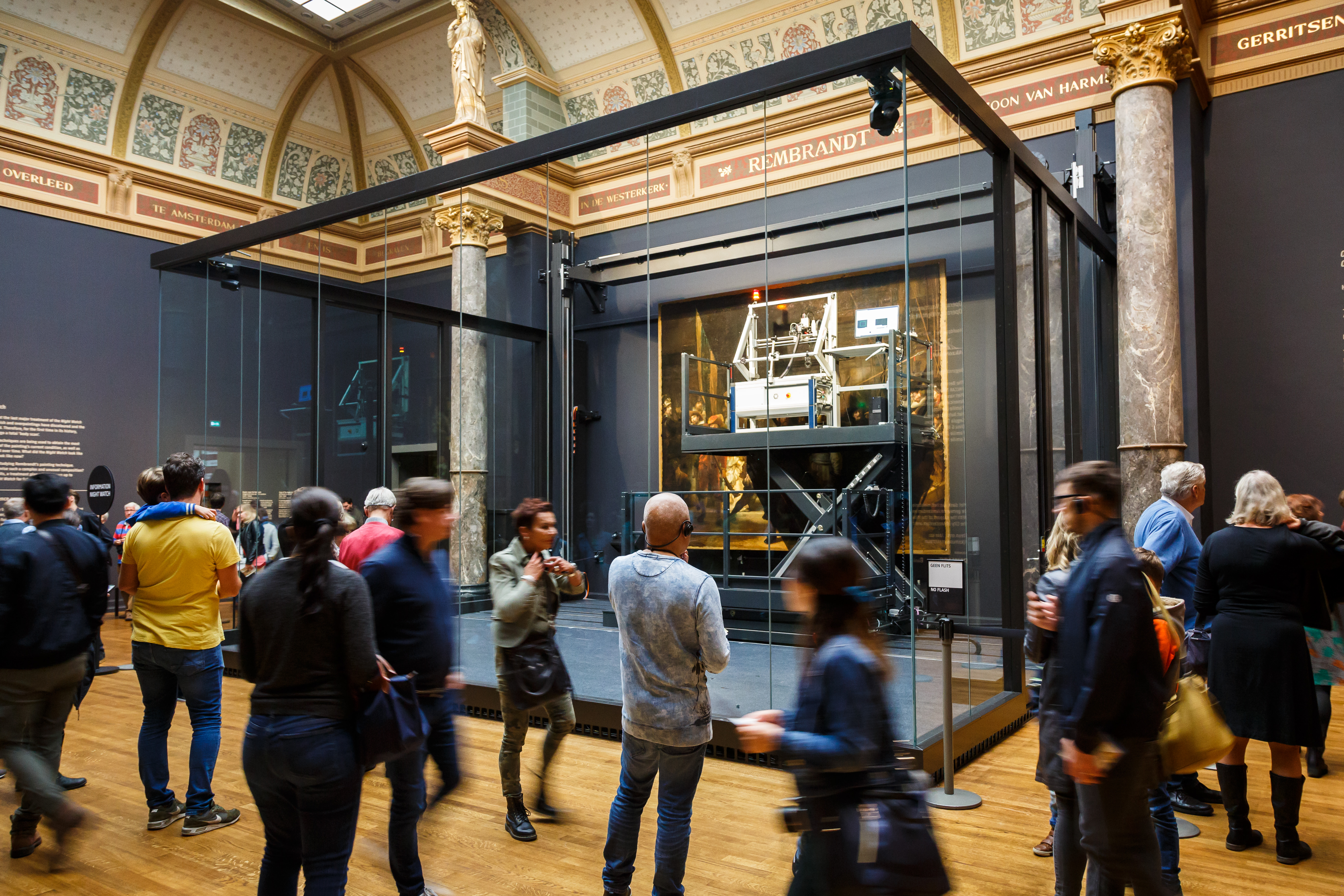
The painting during restoration measures (Operation Night Watch), October 2019

For much of its existence, the painting was coated with a dark varnish, which gave the incorrect impression that it depicted a night scene, leading to the name by which it is now commonly known. On 13 January 1911, a jobless shoemaker and former Navy chef attempted to slash the painting with a shoemaker's knife protesting his inability to find work. However, the thick coating of varnish protected the painting from any damage at that time. The varnish was removed only in the 1940s.

On 14 September 1975, the work was attacked with a bread knife by an unemployed school teacher, Wilhelmus de Rijk, resulting in several large zig-zagged slashes up to 30 cm long. De Rijk, who suffered from mental illness, claimed he "did it for the Lord" and that he "was ordered to do it". The painting was successfully restored after four years, but some evidence of the damage is still visible up close. De Rijk died by suicide in April 1976, before he could have been charged.

On 6 April 1990, an escaped psychiatric patient sprayed acid onto the painting with a concealed pump bottle. Security guards intervened, stopping the man and quickly spraying water onto the canvas. Ultimately, the acid only penetrated the varnish layer of the painting, and it was fully restored.

=== Operation Night Watch ===
In July 2019, a long and complex restoration began. The effort took place in public, in a specially made glass enclosure built and placed in the Rijksmuseum and was livestreamed. The plan was to move the 337 kg painting into the enclosure starting when the museum closed for the day on 9 July, then to map the painting "layer by layer and pigment by pigment", and plan conservation work according to what was found. Taco Dibbits, the Rijksmuseum's general director, said that despite working there for 17 years, he had never seen the top of the painting; "We know so little on how [Rembrandt] worked on making The Night Watch."During the research, scientists detected lead(II) formate in the paint layers - a compound not previously observed in historical oil paintings, offering new insight into the materials Rembrandt used.

While The Night Watch was being restored, museum curator Anne Lenders noticed that the dog in the painting appeared to be modelled after an illustration by Adriaen van de Venne. Analysis through X-ray demonstrated further similarities between the two dogs.

==== Gigapixel photograph ====
On 13 May 2020, the Rijksmuseum published a 44.8 gigapixel image of The Night Watch made from 528 different still photographs. "The 24 rows of 22 pictures were stitched together digitally with the aid of neural networks", the museum said. It was primarily created for scientists to view the painting remotely, and to track how ageing affects the painting. The photograph can be viewed online and zoomed into to see fine detail.

==== AI recreation ====
In 2021, the painting was exhibited from June to September with the trimmed-off sections recreated using convolutional neural networks, an artificial intelligence (AI) algorithm, based on the copy by Lundens. The recreation corrected for perspective (Lundens must have been sitting on the left side of the painting when he made his copy), and used colours and brush-strokes as used by Rembrandt. The trimming of the painting put the lieutenants in the centre, but the original placed them off-centre, marching towards an empty space now reinstated, creating a dynamic of the troops marching towards the left of the painting. The cutdown painting by Rembrandt with the AI recreation of the missing portions attached was placed on exhibition for three months. The augmented painting will not be on permanent display so as not to "trick" viewers into thinking they were seeing the full original; the augmentations are a scientific, rather than an artist's, interpretation.

== Legacy ==
=== In popular culture ===
- Maurice Merleau-Ponty refers to this work in his 1961 essay "Eye and Mind". He writes that "[t]he spatiality of the captain lies at the meeting of two lines of sight that are incompossible with one another. Everyone with eyes has at some time or other witnessed this play of shadows, or something like it, and has been made by it to see a space and the things included therein."
- The work has inspired musical works in both the classical and rock traditions, including the second movement of Gustav Mahler's 7th Symphony and Ayreon's "The Shooting Company of Captain Frans B. Cocq" from Universal Migrator Part 1: The Dream Sequencer. In King Crimson's song "The Night Watch", from the band's 1974 album Starless and Bible Black, lyricist Richard Palmer-James muses on the painting to capture a key period in Dutch history, when, after a long period of "Spanish Wars", the merchants and other members of the bourgeoisie can turn their lives inward and focus on the tangible results of their lives' efforts. The song adopts a number of perspectives, including the primary subjects, the artist himself, and a modern viewer of the painting, and paints a portrait of the emergence of the modern upper-middle class and the consumerist culture.
- Alexander Korda's 1936 biographical film Rembrandt depicts the painting, shown in error in its truncated form, as a failure at its completion, perceived as lampooning its outraged subjects.
- In Jean-Luc Godard's 1982 film Passion, The Night Watch is re-enacted with live actors in an opening shot. Godard explicitly compares his film to Rembrandt's painting, describing them both as "full of holes and badly-filled spaces". He instructs the viewer not to focus on the overall composition, but to approach his film as one would a Rembrandt and "focus on the faces".
- The Night Watch is a major plot device in the eponymous 1995 film, Night Watch, which focuses on the painting's theft.
- The Night Watch is parodied on the British cover of Terry Pratchett's 2002 book by the same name. The cover illustrator, Paul Kidby, pays tribute to his predecessor Josh Kirby by placing him in the picture, in the position where Rembrandt is said to have painted himself. A copy of the original painting appears on the back cover of the book.
- The Night Watch is the subject of a 2007 film by director Peter Greenaway called Nightwatching, in which the film posits a conspiracy within the musketeer regiment of Frans Banning Cocq and Willem van Ruytenburch, and suggests that Rembrandt may have immortalised a conspiracy theory using subtle allegory in his group portrait of the regiment, subverting what was to have been a highly prestigious commission for both painter and subject. His 2008 film Rembrandt's J'Accuse is a sequel or follow-on, and covers the same idea, using extremely detailed analysis of the compositional elements in the painting; in this Greenaway describes The Night Watch as (currently) the fourth most famous painting in the Western world, after the Mona Lisa, The Last Supper and the ceiling of the Sistine Chapel.
- In 2006. The Night Watch inspired the literary work A Ronda da Noite by the famous Portuguese writer Agustina Bessa Luís.
- On The Amazing Race 21, a task in Amsterdam had teams re-create The Night Watch using live actors.
- The painting appears in episode 3 of season 2 of Netflix's Sense8.
- KLM's first Airbus A350, registered PH-ZNA, is named The Nightwatch.

=== Other representations ===
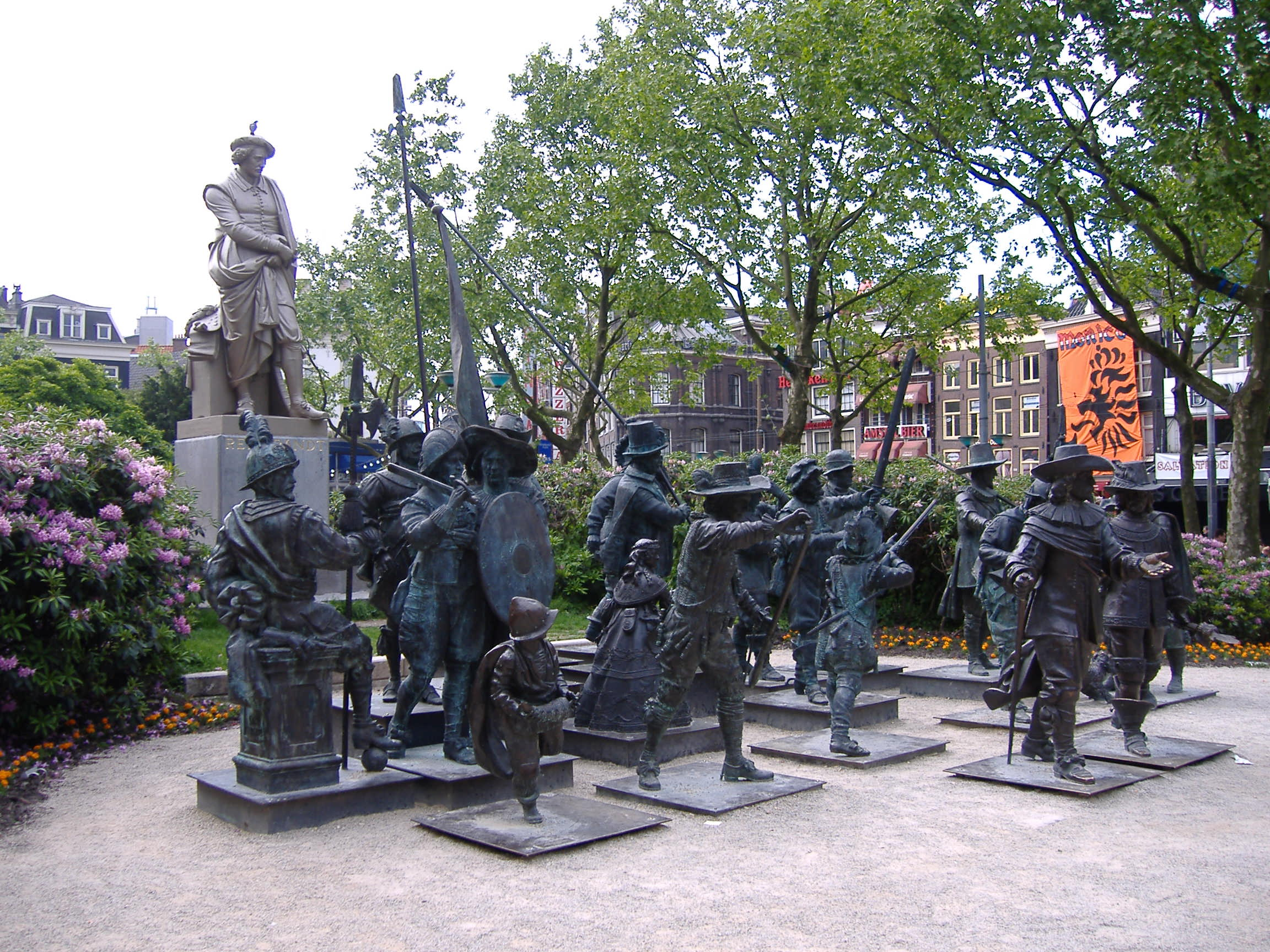
The sculptures of The Night Watch in 3D at the Rembrandtplein in Amsterdam in 2006–2009

- In 2005, Russian sculptor Mikhail Dronov and his Russian-Dutch colleague Alexander Taratynov created a bronze-cast representation of the famous painting, that was displayed in Amsterdam's Rembrandtplein from 2006 to 2009. After displays in other locations, the sculptures returned in 2012, installed in front of Louis Royer's 1852 cast iron statue of Rembrandt. The statues were removed on 12 February 2020. Rembrandtplein business association was unable to reach an agreement with the artists (Mikhail Dronov and Alexander Taratynov) regarding either the rental or purchase of the Night Watch sculptures.
- The only full-sized replica in the Western world is displayed by the Canajoharie Library & Art Gallery, in Canajoharie, US, donated to the library in the early 20th century by the library's founder, Bartlett Arkell.
- The Rijksmuseum's flashmob 'Our Heroes are Back' recreated The Night Watch in an unsuspecting shopping mall in Breda, Netherlands.
- The Night Watch is also replicated in Delft blue at De Koninklijke Porceleyne Fles in Delft, the Netherlands. This version consists of 480 tiles. Two painters of the manufacture worked simultaneously from the left and right end of the frame, and they met at the centre to complete the grand piece. After finishing, both painters recognised that they had a more difficult job as they only used black, to paint The Night Watch. They used the traditional cobalt oxide colour adding water to make the lighter shades. Once it was fired at 1,200 degrees Celsius, the black material turns into blue. It seems that this version of The Night Watch, was bought by an unknown buyer and then given to the museum on loan to display to the public.
- In 2007, Austrian artist Matthias Laurenz Gräff, a distant descendant of Banninck Cocq and the De Graeff family, used Rembrandt's Night Watch painting of Frans Banninck Cocq in his painting "Ahnenfolge" (Ancestral Succession/Ancestry) as part of his diploma series and thesis "Weltaußenschau-Weltinnenschau".

== See also ==
- List of paintings by Rembrandt
- Rijksmuseum
